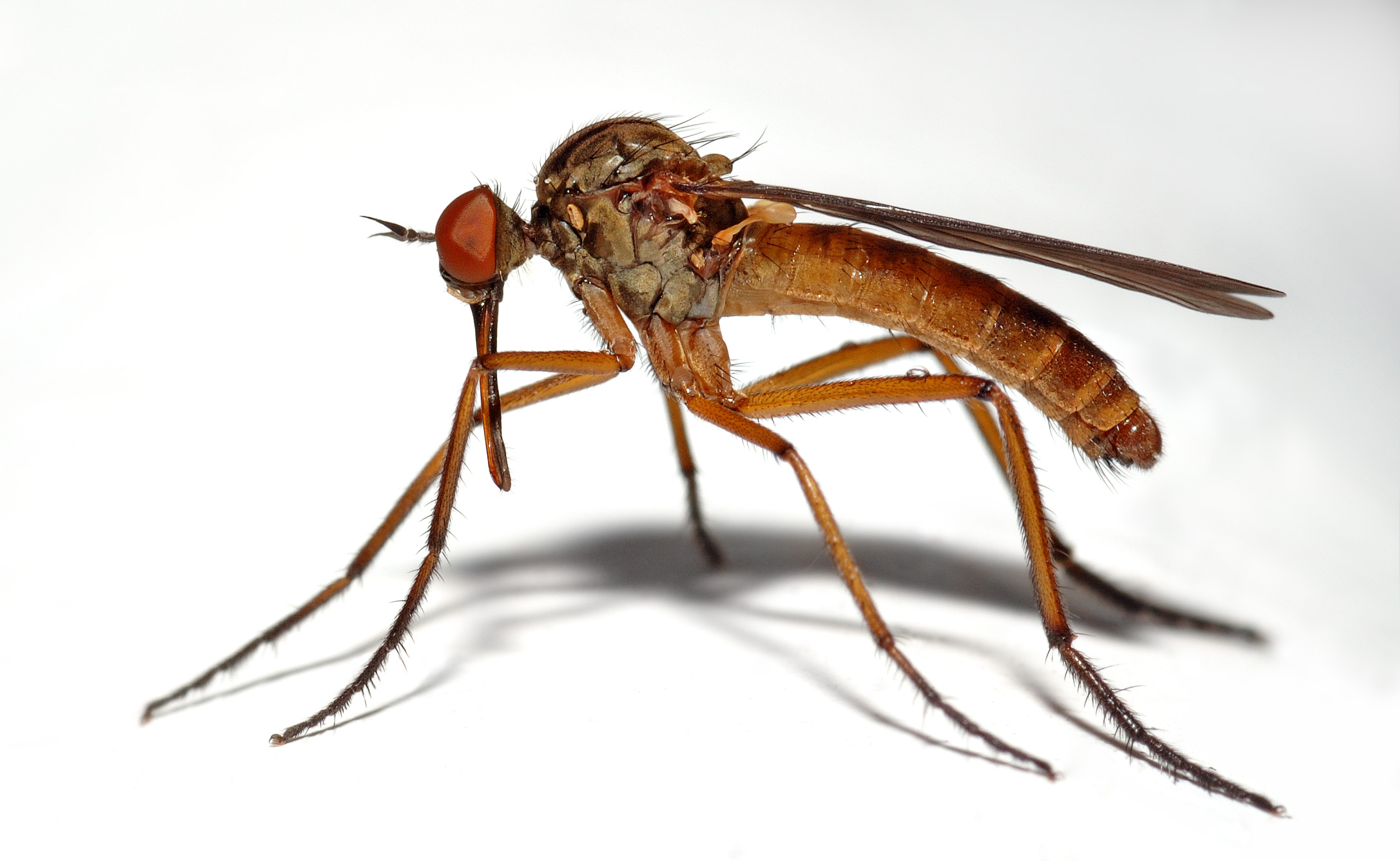
- Male Empis livida

Scientific classification
- Kingdom: Animalia
- Phylum: Arthropoda
- Clade: Pancrustacea
- Class: Insecta
- Order: Diptera
- Family: Empididae
- Subfamily: Empidinae
- Genus: Empis; Linnaeus, 1758

Type species
- Empis genualis Strobl, 1893

Synonyms
- Empimorpha Coquillett, 1895

= Empis =

Genus of dance fly

Empis (Xanthempis) lutea, female feeding honeydew

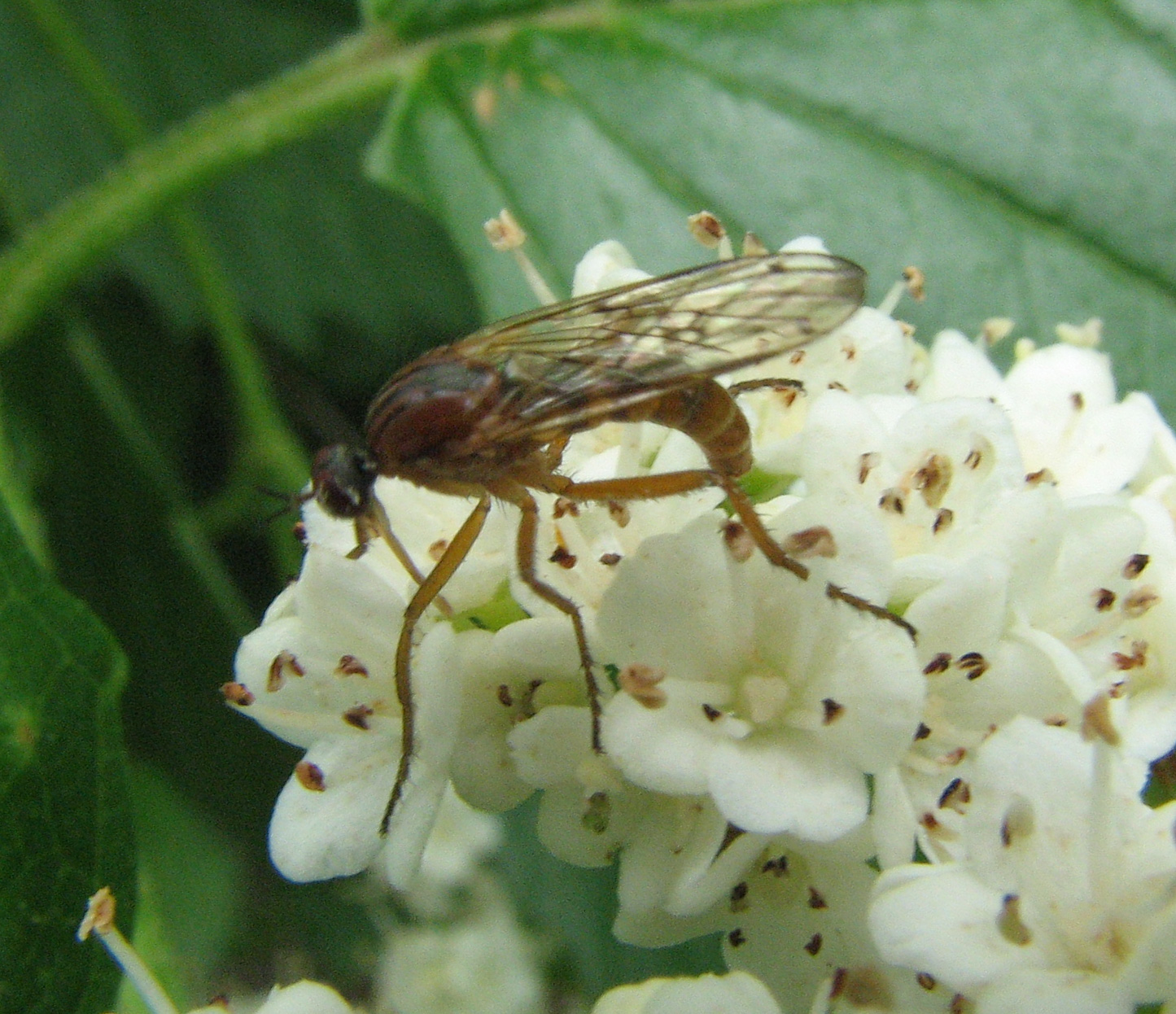
Empis tridentata, female

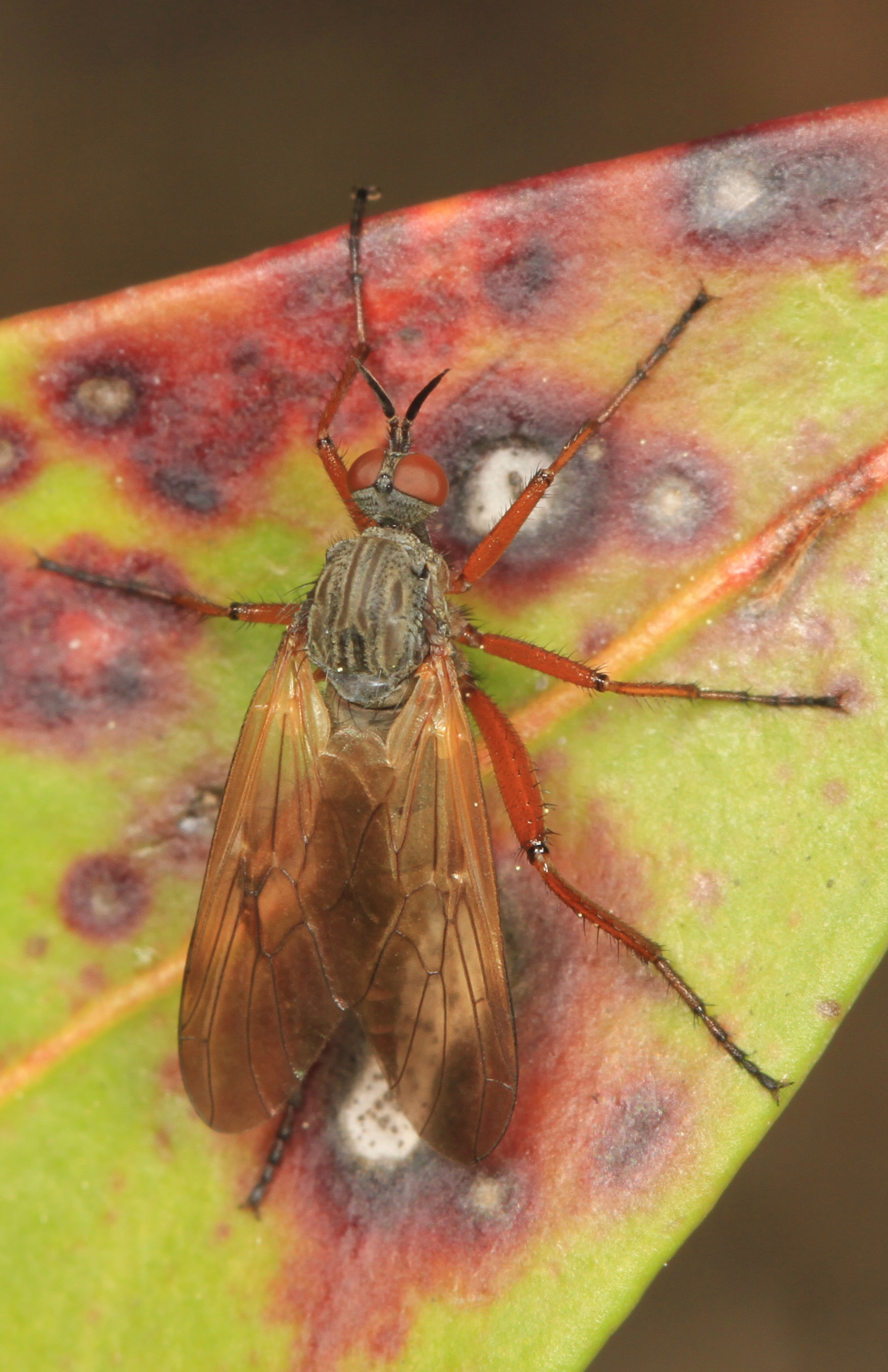
Empis spectabilis

Empis is a genus of dance fly found in the fly family Empididae.

== Species ==
Anacrostichus Bezzi, 1909
- Empis bistortae Meigen, 1822
- Empis lucida Zetterstedt, 1838
- Empis monticola Loew, 1868
- Empis nitida Meigen, 1804
- Empis verralli Collin, 1927
Argyrandrus Bezzi, 1909
- Empis dispar Scholtz, 1851
Coptophlebia Bezzi, 1909
- Empis albinervis Meigen, 1822
- Empis hyalipennis Fallén, 1816
- Empis impennis Strobl, 1902
- Empis lindneri Smith, 1925
- Empis producta Daugeron, 2005
- Empis vitripennis Meigen, 1822
- Empis volucris Wiedemann in Meigen, 1822
Empis Linnaeus, 1758
- Empis aestiva Loew, 1867
- Empis bicuspidata Collin, 1927
- Empis caudatula Loew, 1867
- Empis chioptera Meigen, 1804
- Empis decora Meigen, 1822
- Empis limata Collin, 1927
- Empis nigripes Fabricius, 1794
- Empis nuntia Meigen, 1838
- Empis pennipes Linnaeus, 1758
- Empis planetica Collin, 1927
- Empis praevia Collin, 1927
- Empis prodromus Loew, 1867
- Empis rufiventris Meigen, 1838
- Empis syrovatkai Chvála, 1985
- Empis tanysphyra Loew, 1873
- Empis woodi Collin, 1927
Euempis Frey, 1953
- Empis basalis Loew, 1873
- Empis calcarata Bezzi, 1899
- Empis ciliata Fabricius, 1787
- Empis erosa Loew, 1869
- Empis fiumana Egger, 1860
- Empis kerteszi Bezzi, 1900
- Empis mikii Strobl, 1899
- Empis mirandica Chvála, 1981
- Empis morenae Strobl, 1899
- Empis morio Fabricius, 1794
- Empis picipes Meigen, 1804
- Empis pilicornis Loew, 1867
- Empis sericans Brulle, 1833
- Empis spiralis Collin, 1937
- Empis tessellata Fabricius, 1794
Kritempis Collin, 1926
- Empis livida Linnaeus, 1758
Leptempis Collin, 1926
- Empis abdominalis Daugeron, 1999
- Empis adusta Loew, 1869
- Empis affinis Egger, 1860
- Empis alpina Loew, 1867
- Empis cognata Egger, 1860
- Empis confusa Loew, 1865
- Empis dimidiata Meigen in Gistl, 1835
- Empis discolor Loew, 1856
- Empis divisa Loew, 1869
- Empis flavitarsis Roser, 1840
- Empis gaigeri Gercke, 1886
- Empis grisea Fallén, 1816
- Empis lamellata Daugeron, 1999
- Empis lamellimmanis Daugeron, 1999
- Empis macra Loew, 1867
- Empis maculata Fabricius, 1781
- Empis meridionalis Meigen, 1822
- Empis mesogramma Loew, 1867
- Empis multispina Daugeron, 1999
- Empis nigricans Meigen, 1804
- Empis pandellei Daugeron, 1999
- Empis pteropoda Egger, 1860
- Empis rava Loew, 1862
- Empis rustica Fallén, 1816
- Empis sinuosa Daugeron, 1999
- Empis spitzeri Chvála, 1977
- Empis trunca Daugeron, 1999
- Empis variegata Meigen, 1804
Lissempis Bezzi, 1909
- Empis cuneipennis Bezzi, 1899
- Empis curvitibia Chvála, 2003
- Empis insularis Chvála, 2003
- Empis liosoma Bezzi, 1909
- Empis nigritarsis Meigen, 1804
Pachymeria Stephens, 1829
- Empis femorata Fabricius, 1798
- Empis scotica Curtis, 1835
- Empis tumida Meigen, 1822
Platyptera Meigen, 1803
- Empis borealis Linnaeus, 1758
Polyblepharis Bezzi, 1909
- Empis albicans Meigen, 1822
- Empis candidata Loew, 1873
- Empis cothurnata Brulle, 1833
- Empis crassa Nowicki, 1868
- Empis curta Loew, 1869
- Empis curvipes Loew, 1868
- Empis dasynota Loew, 1869
- Empis dedecor Loew, 1869
- Empis depilis Loew, 1873
- Empis divergens Loew, 1869
- Empis engeli Chvála, 1999
- Empis eumera Loew, 1868
- Empis eversmanni Loew, 1873
- Empis fallax Egger, 1860
- Empis gravipes Loew, 1856
- Empis haemi Loew, 1862
- Empis haemorrhoica Loew, 1869
- Empis lugubris Loew, 1869
- Empis nigerrima Loew, 1862
- Empis opaca Meigen, 1804
- Empis phaenomeris Loew, 1868
- Empis soror Collin, 1937
- Empis strigata Loew, 1867
Rhadinempis Collin, 1926
- Empis bazini Collin, 1926
- Empis soror Collin, 1937
Xanthempis Bezzi, 1909
- Empis adriani Chvála, 1996
- Empis aemula Loew, 1873
- Empis aequalis Loew, 1873
- Empis albifrons Bezzi, 1909
- Empis algecirasensis Strobl, 1909
- Empis concolor Verrall, 1872
- Empis digramma Meigen in Gistl, 1835
- Empis dispina Chvála, 1996
- Empis kuntzei Becker, 1910
- Empis laeta Loew, 1869
- Empis laetabilis Collin, 1926
- Empis lagoensis Chvála, 1996
- Empis loewiana Bezzi, 1909
- Empis lutea Meigen, 1804
- Empis nevadensis Chvála, 1981
- Empis oxilara Shamshev, 1998
- Empis punctata Meigen, 1804
- Empis rohaceki Chvála, 1994
- Empis scutellata Curtis, 1835
- Empis semicinerea Loew, 1867
- Empis stercorea Linnaeus, 1761
- Empis styriaca Strobl, 1893
- Empis subscutellata Shamshev, 1998
- Empis testacea Fabricius, 1805
- Empis testiculata Bezzi, 1909
- Empis trigramma Wiedemann in Meigen, 1822
- Empis unistriata Becker, 1887
- Empis univittata Loew, 1867

== Images ==
- images at Barcode of Life Data System

== See also ==
- List of Empis species
