= Empis dispar =

Scientific classification
- Kingdom: Animalia
- Phylum: Arthropoda
- Class: Insecta
- Order: Diptera
- Family: Empididae
- Genus: Empis
- Subgenus: Argyrandrus
- Species: E. dispar

Binomial name
- Empis dispar Scholtz, 1851

Species of fly

Empis dispar is a species of fly in the family Empididae. It is included in the subgenus Argyrandrus. It is found in the Palearctic.
