= Empis spitzeri =

Scientific classification
- Kingdom: Animalia
- Phylum: Arthropoda
- Class: Insecta
- Order: Diptera
- Family: Empididae
- Genus: Empis
- Subgenus: Leptempis
- Species: E. spitzeri

Binomial name
- Empis spitzeri Chvála, 1977

Species of fly

Empis spitzeri is a species of fly in the family Empididae. It is included in the subgenus Leptempis. It is found in the Palearctic.
