= Empis fiumana =

Scientific classification
- Kingdom: Animalia
- Phylum: Arthropoda
- Class: Insecta
- Order: Diptera
- Family: Empididae
- Genus: Empis
- Subgenus: Euempis
- Species: E. fiumana

Binomial name
- Empis fiumana Egger, 1860

Species of fly

Empis fiumana is a species of fly in the family Empididae. It is included in the subgenus Euempis. It is found in the Palearctic.
