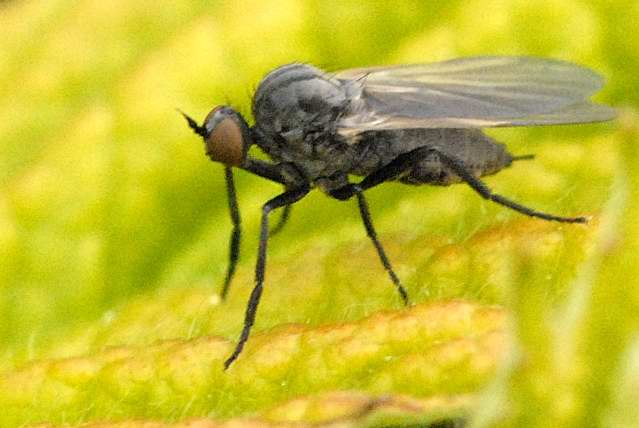

Scientific classification
- Kingdom: Animalia
- Phylum: Arthropoda
- Class: Insecta
- Order: Diptera
- Family: Empididae
- Genus: Empis
- Subgenus: Empis
- Species: E. caudatula

Binomial name
- Empis caudatula Loew, 1867

= Empis caudatula =

Species of fly

Empis caudatula is a species of dance flies, in the fly family Empididae. It is included in the subgenus Empis. It is found in central and northern Europe.
