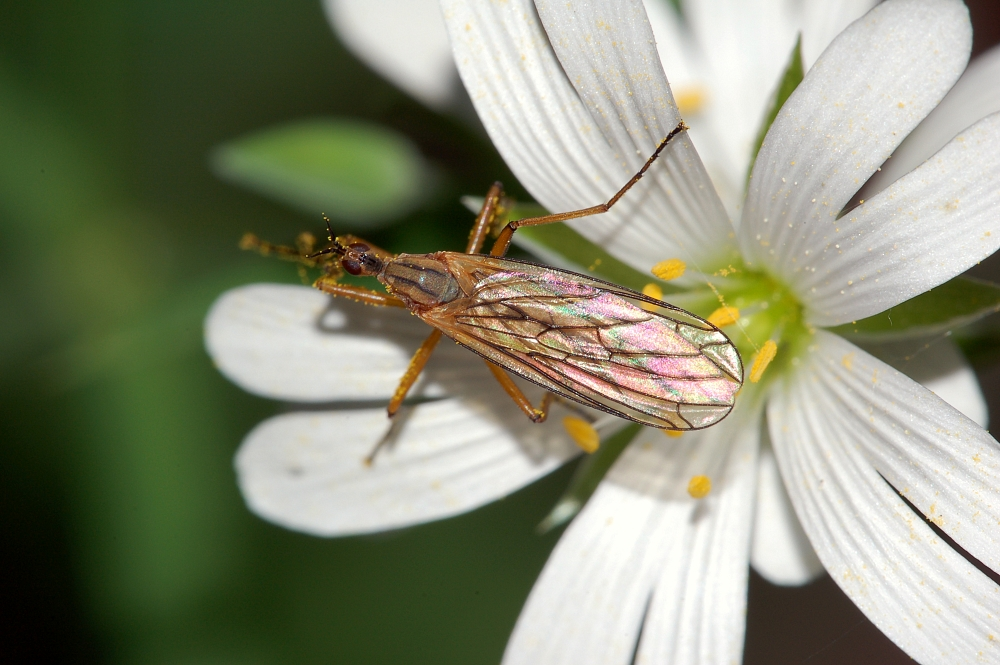

Scientific classification
- Kingdom: Animalia
- Phylum: Arthropoda
- Class: Insecta
- Order: Diptera
- Family: Empididae
- Genus: Empis
- Subgenus: Xanthempis
- Species: E. digramma

Binomial name
- Empis digramma Meigen in Gistl, 1835

Synonyms
- Empis bilineata Loew, 1867

= Empis digramma =

Species of fly

Empis digramma is a species of dance flies, in the fly family Empididae. It is included in the subgenus Xanthempis. The thorax is gray with yellowish sides, with two dark stripes following the line of the dorsocentral bristles. Abdomen is gray upper and yellowish on the sides. The fly's length is 5–7.5 millimetres (0.2–0.3 in).
