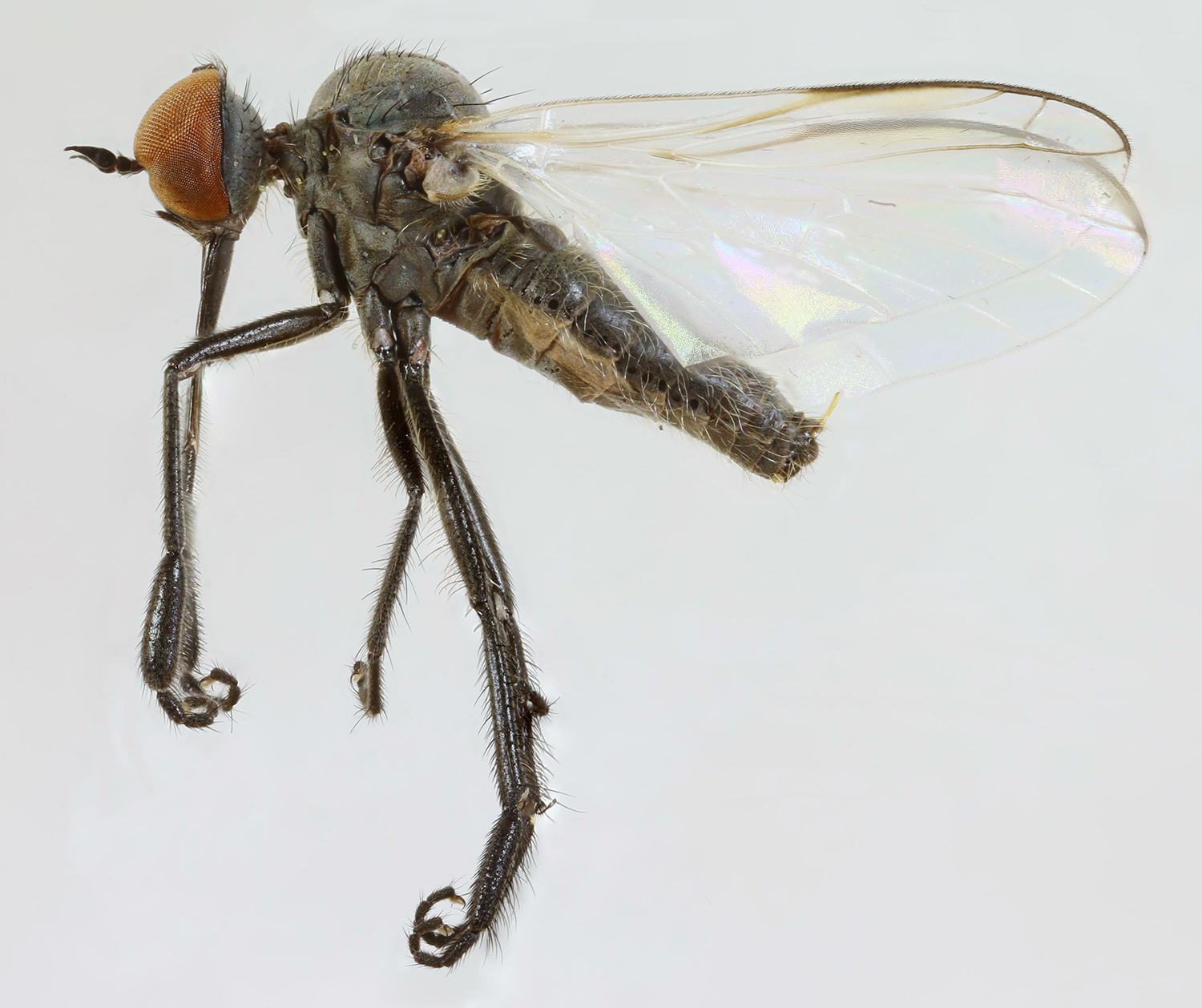
- Empis chioptera North Wales Wing length 2.2 - 4 mm.

Scientific classification
- Kingdom: Animalia
- Phylum: Arthropoda
- Class: Insecta
- Order: Diptera
- Family: Empididae
- Genus: Empis
- Subgenus: Empis
- Species: E. chioptera

Binomial name
- Empis chioptera Meigen, 1804

= Empis chioptera =

Species of fly

Empis chioptera is a species of fly in the family Empididae. It is included in the subgenus Empis. It is found in the Palearctic.
