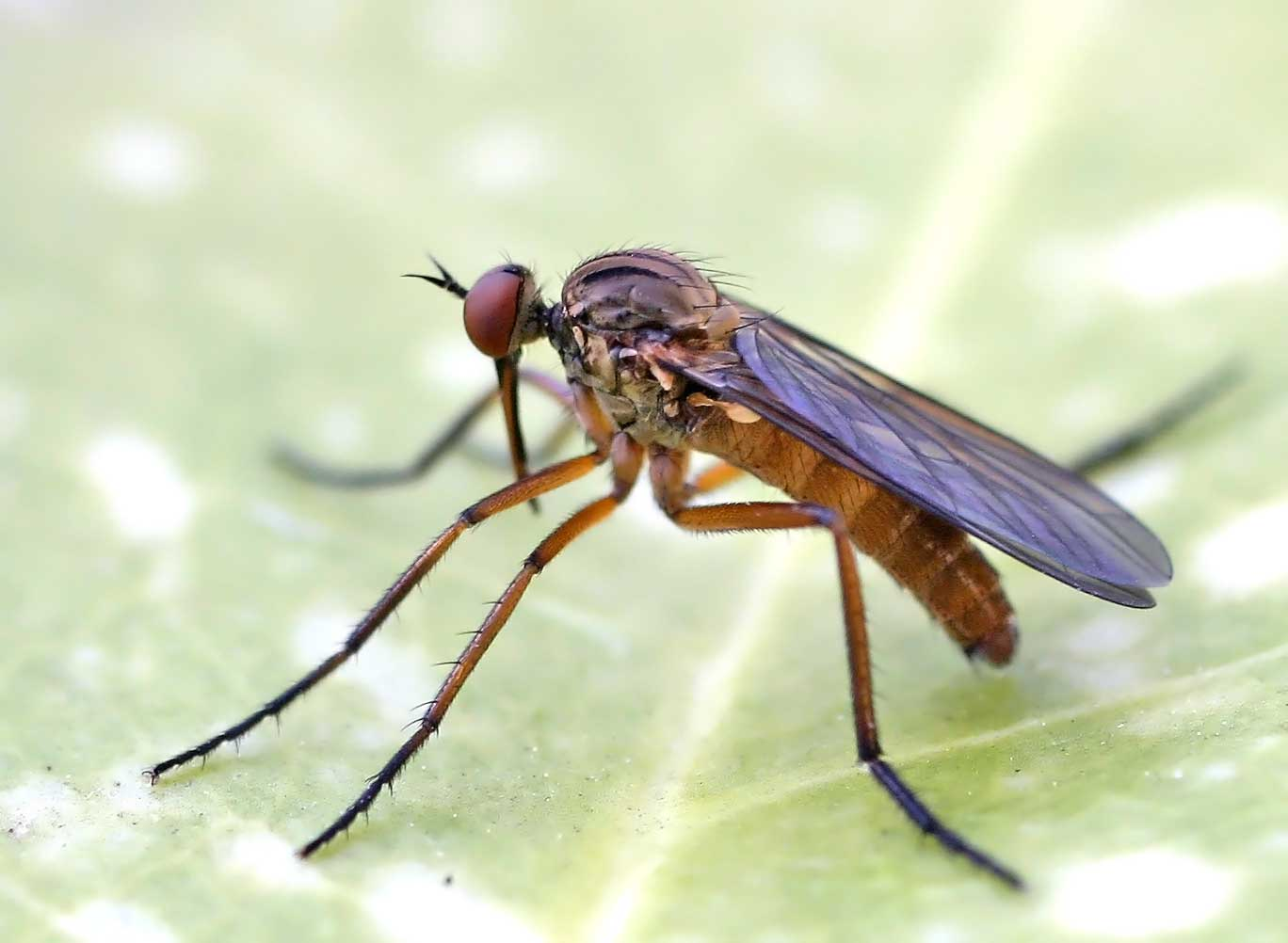
- Empis stercorea

Scientific classification
- Kingdom: Animalia
- Phylum: Arthropoda
- Class: Insecta
- Order: Diptera
- Family: Empididae
- Genus: Empis
- Subgenus: Xanthempis
- Species: E. stercorea

Binomial name
- Empis stercorea Linnaeus, 1761

= Empis stercorea =

Species of fly

Empis stercorea is a large species of dance flies, in the fly family Empididae. It is included in the subgenus Xanthempis. It is found in most of Europe, except the Iberian Peninsula.
