= Ole Engel Heie =

Danish biology professor and entomologist (1926–2019)

Ole Engel Heie (10 May 1926 – 4 January 2019) was a Danish biology professor and entomologist who specialized in the Aphidomorpha (Aphids and allies). He published a highly influential six-part monograph on the aphids as part of the Fauna Entomologica Scandinavica published from 1980 - 1995.

Heie was born in Copenhagen. After completing his Ph.D. in 1967 he became a professor at the Danmarks Lærerhøjskole where he worked until his retirement in 1994. He was a visiting professor at North Carolina State University and continued as an emeritus professor. He headed the Danish Natural History Association and was Knighted with the Order of the Dannebrog on October 24, 1990 by Denmark. Heie was greatly influenced by Hennig's cladistic approach and wrote a book on evolution in 1969 and another on taxonomy in 1983.
