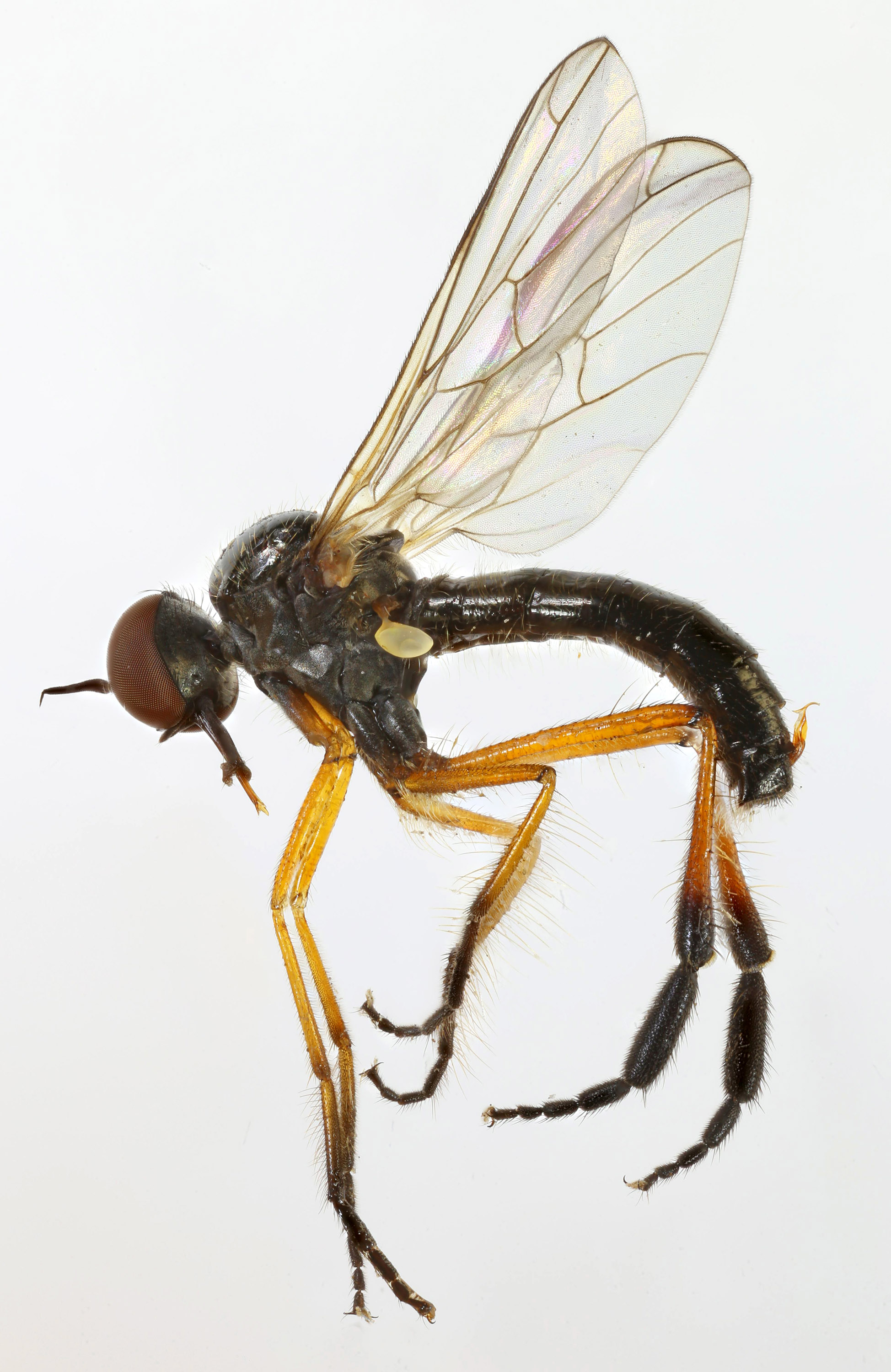
- Empis nigritarsis male

Scientific classification
- Kingdom: Animalia
- Phylum: Arthropoda
- Class: Insecta
- Order: Diptera
- Family: Empididae
- Genus: Empis
- Subgenus: Lissempis
- Species: E. nigritarsis

Binomial name
- Empis nigritarsis Meigen, 1804

= Empis nigritarsis =

Species of insect

Empis nigritarsis is a species of fly in the family Empididae. It is included in the subgenus Lissempis of the genus Empis. It is found in the Palearctic.
