= Empis unistriata =

Scientific classification
- Kingdom: Animalia
- Phylum: Arthropoda
- Class: Insecta
- Order: Diptera
- Family: Empididae
- Genus: Empis
- Subgenus: Xanthempis
- Species: E. unistriata

Binomial name
- Empis unistriata Becker, 1887

Species of fly

Empis unistriata is a species of fly in the family Empididae. It is included in the subgenus Xanthempis. It is found in the Palearctic.
