= Empis scotica =

Scientific classification
- Kingdom: Animalia
- Phylum: Arthropoda
- Class: Insecta
- Order: Diptera
- Family: Empididae
- Genus: Empis
- Subgenus: Empis (Pachymeria)
- Species: E. scotica

Binomial name
- Empis scotica Curtis, 1835

Species of fly

Empis scotica is a species of fly in the family Empididae. It is included in the subgenus Pachymeria of the genus Empis. It is found in the Palearctic.
