= Fauna Entomologica Scandinavica =

Scientific book series

Fauna Entomologica Scandinavica is a scientific book series of entomological identification manuals for insects (and other terrestrial arthropods) in North-West Europe, mainly Fennoscandia and Denmark. The series is used by a number of groups, such as ecologists, biologists, and insect collectors. The books are in English, and published by the Dutch academic publishing house Brill.

== Titles ==
Number	Title	Author	Pages	Date
1	The Stratiomyioidea (Diptera) of Fennoscandia and Denmark	R. Rozkosný	140	1973
2	The Sesiidae (Lepidoptera) of Fennoscandia and Denmark	M. Fibiger and N.P. Kristensen	91	1974
3	The Tachydromiinae (Diptera; Empididae) of Fennoscandia and Denmark	Milan Chvála	336	1975
4	The Sphecidae (Hymenoptera) of Fennoscandia and Denmark	O Lomholdt	452	1984
5	The Agromyzidae (Diptera) of Fennoscandia and Denmark (Diptera) 2 volumes	K. Spencer	606	1976
6	The Elachistidae (Lepidoptera) of Fennoscandia and Denmark	E Traugott-Olsen and E Schmidt Nielsen	299	1977
7/1	The Auchenorrhyncha (Homoptera) of Fennoscandia and Denmark, Volume 1: Introduction, infraorder Fulgoromorpha	F Ossiannilsson	222	1978
7/2	The Auchenorrhyncha (Homoptera) of Fennoscandia and Denmark, Volume 2:	F Ossiannilsson	370	1981
7/3	The Auchenorrhyncha (Homoptera) of Fennoscandia and Denmark, Volume 3: Family Cicadellidae: Deltocephalinae.	F Ossiannilsson	384	1983
8	The Formicidae (Hymenoptera) of Fennoscandia and Denmark	C.A. Collingwood	174	1979
9	The Aphidoidea (Hemiptera) of Fennoscandia and Denmark 1 - Families Mindaridae, Hormaphididae, Thelaxidae, Anoeciidae, and Pemphigidae.	Ole Engel Heie	236	1980
10	The Buprestidae (Coleoptera) of Fennoscandia and Denmark	S. Bilý	110	1982
11	The Aphidoidea (Hemiptera) of Fennoscandia and Denmark 2 - Drepanosiphidae	Ole E. Heie	176	1982
12	The Empidoidea (Diptera) of Fennoscandia and Denmark, Part 2:: General Part; Families Hybotidae, Atelestidae and Microphoridae.	Milan Chvála	279	1983
13	The Scythrididae (Lepidoptera) of Northern Europe	Bengt Å Bengtsson	137	1984
14	The Sciomyzidae (Diptera) of Fennoscandia and Denmark. Fauna Entomologica Scandinavica	R. Rozkosný	224	1984
15/1	The Carabidae (Coleoptera), pt 1, with appendix on the Rhysodidae	C. Lindroth	226	1986
15/2	The Carabidae (Coleoptera), pt 2, with appendix on the Rhysodidae	C. Lindroth	274	1986
16	The Saltatoria (Bush-Crickets, Crickets and Grass-Hoppers) of Northern Europe	Knud Th. Holst	127	1986
17	The Aphidoidea (Hemiptera) of Fennoscandia and Denmark Volume 3. Family Aphididae: Subfamily Pterocommatinae and Tribe Aphidini of Subfamily Aphidinae	Ole E. Heie	314	1986
18	The Hydrophiloidea (Coleoptera) of Fennoscandia and Denmark	M. Hansen	254	1987
19	The Sarcophagidae (Diptera) of Fennoscandia and Denmark	Thomas Pape	203	1987
20	The Aquatic Adephaga (Coleoptera) of Fennoscandia and Denmark, Volume I. Gyrinidae, Haliplidae, Hygrobiidae and Noteridae.	Mogens Holmen	168	1987
21	Stoneflies (Plecoptera) of Fennoscandia and Denmark	A. Lillehammer	165	1988
22	Longhorn Beetles (Coleoptera, Cerambycidae) of Fennoscandia and Denmark	S. Bílý and O. Mehl	203	1989
23	The Nepticulidae and Opostegidae (Lepidoptera) of North and West Europe, 2 pts	Johansson	740	1991
24	Blowflies (Diptera, Calliphoridae) of Fennoscandia and Denmark	Knut Rognes	272	1991
25	The Aphidoidea (Hemiptera) of Fennoscandia and Denmark, Volume 4. Family Aphididae: Part 1 of Tribe Macrosiphini of Subfamily Aphidinae.	Ole E. Heie	189	1992
26	The Psylloidea (Homoptera) of Fennoscandia and Denmark	F. Ossiannilsson	347	1992
27	The Carabidae (Coleoptera) Larvae of Fennoscandia and Denmark	Martin L. Luff	188	1993
28	The Aphidoidea (Hemiptera) of Fennoscandia and Denmark, Volume 5. Family Aphididae: Part 2 of Tribe Macrosiphini of Subfamily Aphidinae.	Ole E. Heie	268	1994
29	The Empididae (Diptera) of Fennoscandia and Denmark, Part III	Milan Chvála	192	1994
30	The Dryinidae and Embolemidae (Hymenoptera: Chrysidoidea) of Fennoscandia and Denmark	M. Olmi	100	1994
31	The Aphidoidea (Hemiptera) of Fennoscandia and Denmark, Volume 6. Family Aphididae: Part 3 of Tribe Macrosiphini of Subfamily Aphidinae, and family Lachnidae.	Ole E. Heie	222	1995
32	The Aquatic Adephaga (Coleoptera) of Fennoscandia and Denmark, Volume II. Dytiscidae	Anders N. Nilsson and Mogens Holmen	192	1995
33	The Siphonini (Diptera: Tachinidae) of Europe	Stig Andersen	148	1997
34	The Brentidae (Coleoptera) of Northern Europe	H. Goenget	CD Rom	1997
35	The Collembola of Fennoscandia and Denmark, Part I: Poduromorpha	Arne Fjellberg	184	1998
36	The Flat-footed Flies (Diptera: Opetiidae and Platypezidae) of Europe	Peter J. Chandler	278	2001
37	The Sepsidae (Diptera) of Europe	Adrian C. Pont and Rudolf Meier	198	2002
38	The Nemonychidae, Anthribidae and Attelabidae (Coleoptera) of Northern Europe	Hans Gønget	132	2003
39	The Drosophilidae (Diptera) of Fennoscandia and Denmark	Gerhard Bächli, Carlos R. Vilela, Stefan Andersson Escher and Anssi Saura	362	2005
40	The Empidoidea (Diptera) of Fennoscandia and Denmark, Part IV: Genus Hilara	Milan Chvála	234	2005
41	The Fleas (Siphonaptera) of Fennoscandia and Denmark	Gunvor Brinck-Lindroth and F.G.A.M. Smit	185	2007
42	The Collembola of Fennoscandia and Denmark, Part II: Entomobryomorpha and Symphypleona	Arne Fjellberg	184	2007
43	The Frit Flies (Chloropidae, Diptera) of Fennoscandia and Denmark	Emilia P. Nartshuk and Hugo Andersson	277	2013
44	The Greenland Entomofauna - An Identification Manual of Insects, Spiders and their Allies	Jens Böcher, N.P. Kristensen, Thomas Pape, and Lars Vilhelmsen	xvi, 881	2015
