= Empis producta =

Scientific classification
- Kingdom: Animalia
- Phylum: Arthropoda
- Class: Insecta
- Order: Diptera
- Family: Empididae
- Genus: Empis
- Subgenus: Coptophlebia
- Species: E. producta

Binomial name
- Empis producta Daugeron (2005)

Species of fly

Empis producta is a species of fly in the family Empididae. It is included in the subgenus Coptophlebia and is endemic to Singapore.
