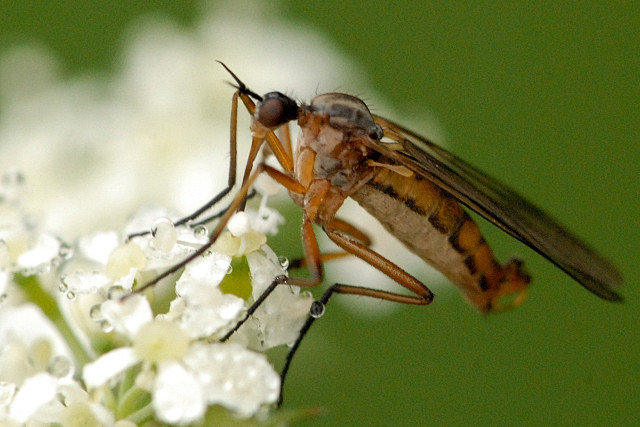

Scientific classification
- Kingdom: Animalia
- Phylum: Arthropoda
- Clade: Pancrustacea
- Class: Insecta
- Order: Diptera
- Family: Empididae
- Genus: Empis
- Subgenus: Xanthempis
- Species: E. trigramma

Binomial name
- Empis trigramma Wiedemann in Meigen, 1822

= Empis trigramma =

Species of fly

Empis trigramma is a species of dance fly, in the fly family Empididae. The thorax with yellowish sides, with three broad dark stripes. Abdomen is shining yellowish, with a dark central stripe. The fly's length is 4.5–6 millimetres (0.2–0.2 in).
