= Empis gaigeri =

Scientific classification
- Kingdom: Animalia
- Phylum: Arthropoda
- Clade: Pancrustacea
- Class: Insecta
- Order: Diptera
- Family: Empididae
- Genus: Empis
- Subgenus: Euempis
- Species: E. gaigeri

Binomial name
- Empis gaigeri Gercke, 1886

Species of fly

Empis gaigeri is a species of fly in the family Empididae. It is included in the subgenus Euempis. It is found in the Palearctic.
