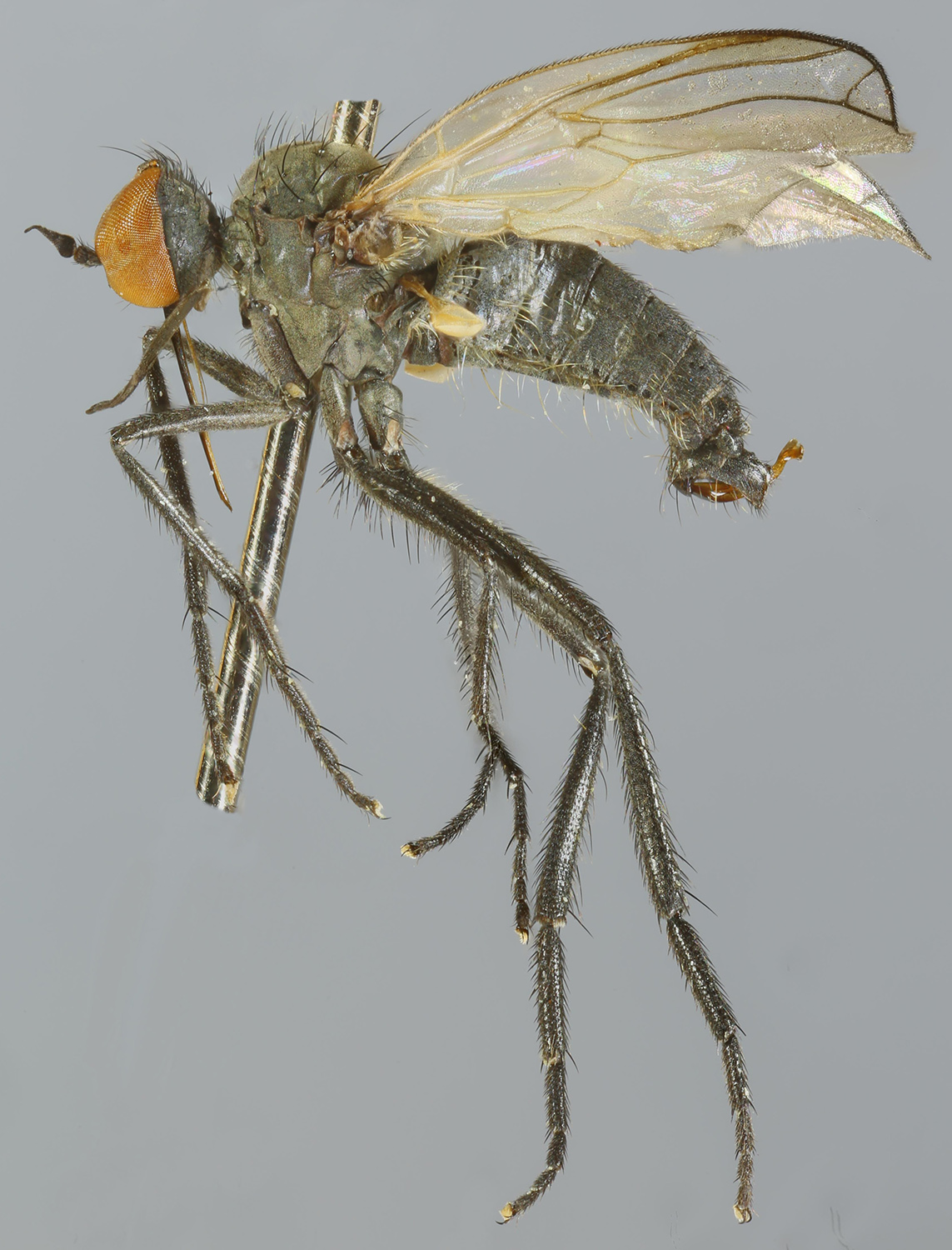
- Empis nigripes North Wales

Scientific classification
- Kingdom: Animalia
- Phylum: Arthropoda
- Class: Insecta
- Order: Diptera
- Family: Empididae
- Genus: Empis
- Subgenus: Empis
- Species: E. nigripes

Binomial name
- Empis nigripes Fabricius, 1794

= Empis nigripes =

Species of fly

Empis nigripes is a species of fly in the family Empididae. It is included in the subgenus Empis. It is found in the Palearctic realm.

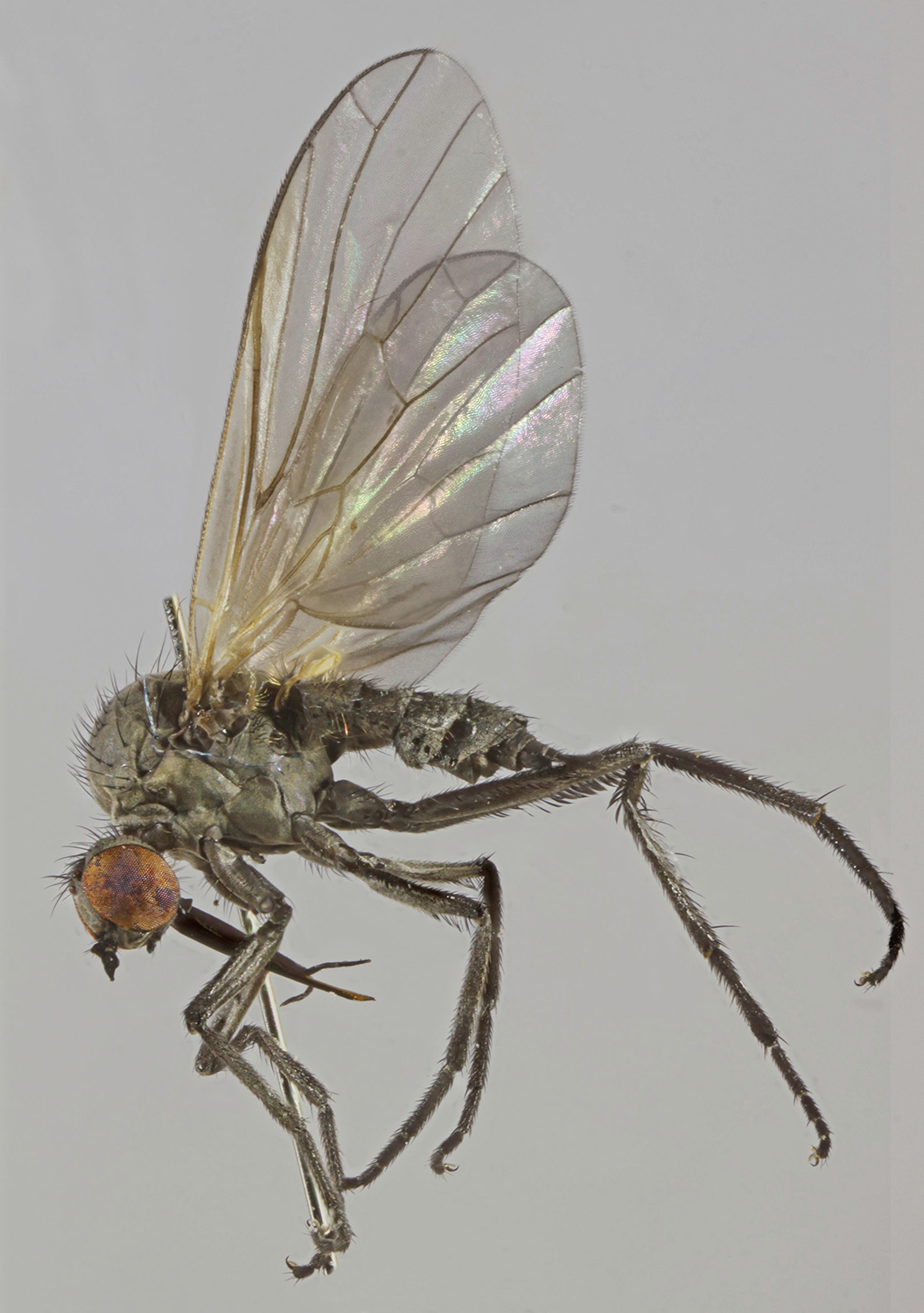
female
