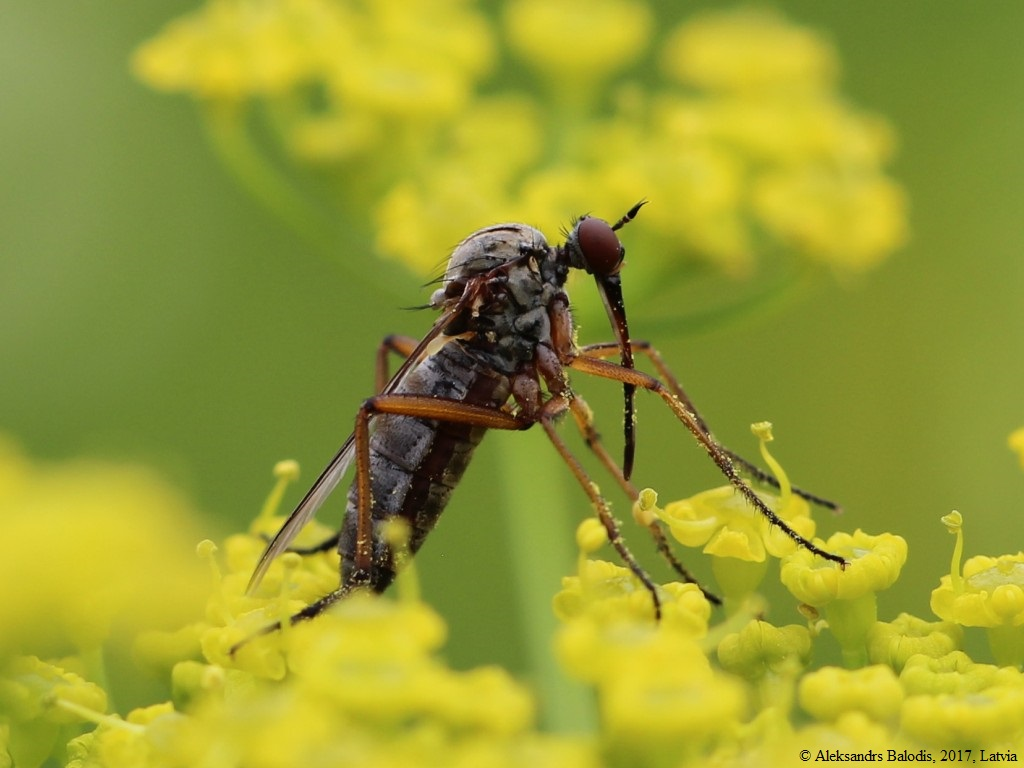

Scientific classification
- Kingdom: Animalia
- Phylum: Arthropoda
- Class: Insecta
- Order: Diptera
- Family: Empididae
- Genus: Empis
- Subgenus: Leptempis
- Species: E. rustica

Binomial name
- Empis rustica Fallén, 1816

= Empis rustica =

Species of insect

Empis rustica is a species of fly in the family Empididae. It is included in the subgenus Leptempis. It is found in the Palearctic.
