= Empis confusa =

Scientific classification
- Kingdom: Animalia
- Phylum: Arthropoda
- Clade: Pancrustacea
- Class: Insecta
- Order: Diptera
- Family: Empididae
- Genus: Empis
- Subgenus: Leptempis
- Species: E. confusa

Binomial name
- Empis confusa Loew, 1865

Species of fly

Empis confusa is a species of fly in the family Empididae. It is included in the subgenus Leptempis. It is found in the Palearctic.
