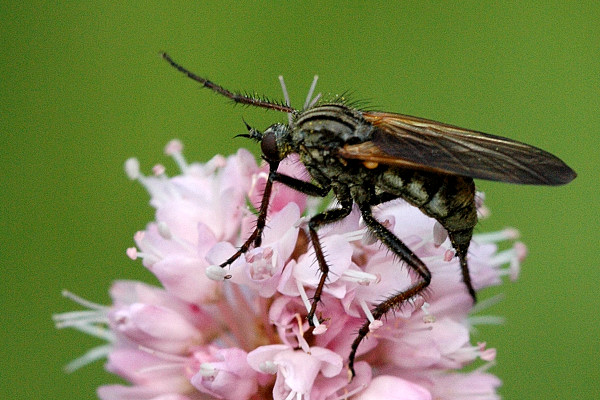
- Empis variegata

Scientific classification
- Kingdom: Animalia
- Phylum: Arthropoda
- Class: Insecta
- Order: Diptera
- Family: Empididae
- Genus: Empis
- Subgenus: Leptempis
- Species: E. variegata

Binomial name
- Empis variegata Meigen, 1804

= Empis variegata =

Species of fly

Empis variegata is a species of dance flies, in the fly family Empididae. It is included in the subgenus Leptempis. It is found from the Benelux, through Germany to Switzerland, Austria, the Czech Republic, Slovakia and Hungary. It has also been recorded from central Russia.
