= Empis tumida =

Scientific classification
- Kingdom: Animalia
- Phylum: Arthropoda
- Class: Insecta
- Order: Diptera
- Family: Empididae
- Genus: Empis
- Subgenus: Empis (Pachymeria)
- Species: E. tumida

Binomial name
- Empis tumida Meigen, 1822

Synonyms
- Pachymeria erberi Nowicki in Loew, 1873

Species of insect

Empis tumida is a species of fly in the family Empididae. It is included in the subgenus Pachymeria of the genus Empis. It is found in the Palearctic.
