= Empis impennis =

Scientific classification
- Kingdom: Animalia
- Phylum: Arthropoda
- Class: Insecta
- Order: Diptera
- Family: Empididae
- Genus: Empis
- Subgenus: Coptophlebia
- Species: E. impennis

Binomial name
- Empis impennis Strobl, 1902

Synonyms
- Empis melaena Bezzi, 1908

Species of insect

Empis impennis is a species of fly in the family Empididae. It is included in the subgenus Coptophlebia of the genus Empis. It is found in the Palearctic.
