= Empis bazini =

Scientific classification
- Kingdom: Animalia
- Phylum: Arthropoda
- Class: Insecta
- Order: Diptera
- Family: Empididae
- Genus: Empis
- Subgenus: Rhadinempis
- Species: E. bazini

Binomial name
- Empis bazini Collin, 1926

Species of fly

Empis bazini is a species of fly in the family Empididae. It is included in the subgenus Rhadinempis of the genus Empis. It is found in the Palearctic.
