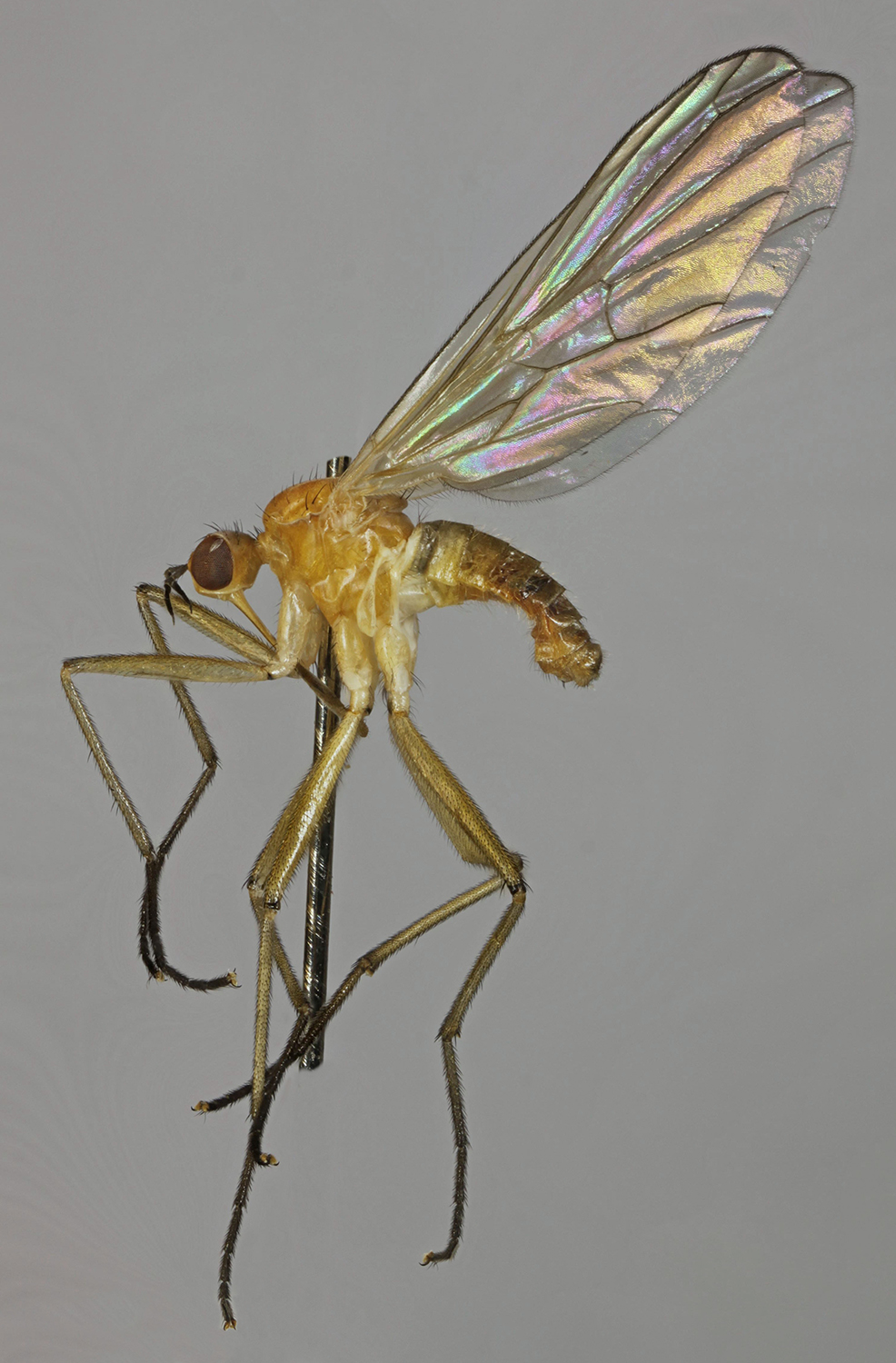

Scientific classification
- Kingdom: Animalia
- Phylum: Arthropoda
- Class: Insecta
- Order: Diptera
- Family: Empididae
- Genus: Empis
- Subgenus: Xanthempis
- Species: E. laetabilis

Binomial name
- Empis laetabilis Collin, 1926

= Empis laetabilis =

Species of fly

Empis laetabilis is a species of fly in the family Empididae. It is included in the subgenus Xanthempis. It is found in the Palearctic.
