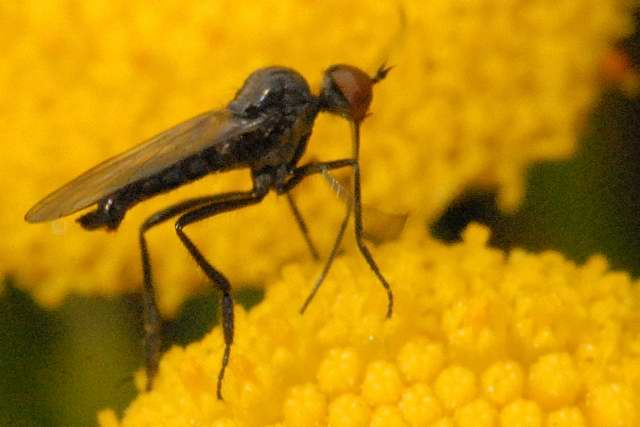

Scientific classification
- Kingdom: Animalia
- Phylum: Arthropoda
- Class: Insecta
- Order: Diptera
- Family: Empididae
- Genus: Empis
- Subgenus: Empis
- Species: E. syrovatkai

Binomial name
- Empis syrovatkai Chvála, 1985

= Empis syrovatkai =

Species of fly

Empis syrovatkai is a species of dance flies, in the fly family Empididae. It is included in the subgenus Empis. It is found from Fennoscandia to northern Russia and in Denmark, the Benelux, Germany, Switzerland, Austria, the Czech Republic, Slovakia and Hungary.
