= Empis gravipes =

Scientific classification
- Kingdom: Animalia
- Phylum: Arthropoda
- Class: Insecta
- Order: Diptera
- Family: Empididae
- Genus: Empis
- Subgenus: Polyblepharis
- Species: E. gravipes

Binomial name
- Empis gravipes Loew, 1856

Species of fly

Empis gravipes is a species of fly in the family Empididae. It is included in the subgenus Polyblepharis. It is found in the Palearctic.
