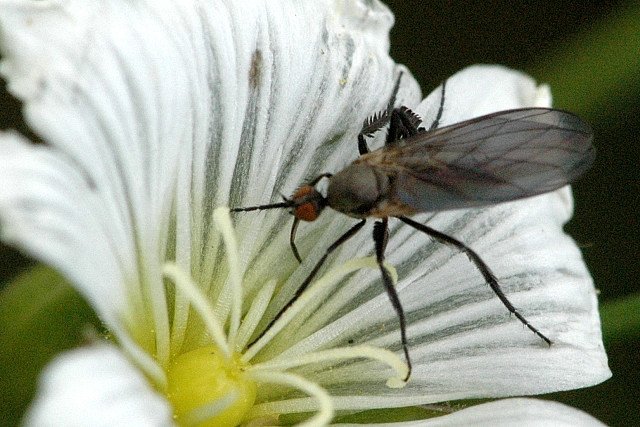

Scientific classification
- Kingdom: Animalia
- Phylum: Arthropoda
- Class: Insecta
- Order: Diptera
- Family: Empididae
- Genus: Empis
- Subgenus: Empis
- Species: E. pennipes

Binomial name
- Empis pennipes Linnaeus, 1758

= Empis pennipes =

Species of fly

Empis pennipes is a species of dance flies, in the fly family Empididae. It is included in the subgenus Empis. It is found in most of Europe, except the Balkan Peninsula and the Iberian Peninsula.
