= Empis cuneipennis =

Scientific classification
- Kingdom: Animalia
- Phylum: Arthropoda
- Clade: Pancrustacea
- Class: Insecta
- Order: Diptera
- Family: Empididae
- Genus: Empis
- Subgenus: Lissempis
- Species: E. cuneipennis

Binomial name
- Empis cuneipennis Bezzi, 1899

Species of fly

Empis cuneipennis is a species of fly in the family Empididae. It is included in the subgenus Lissempis of the genus Empis. It is found in the Palearctic.
