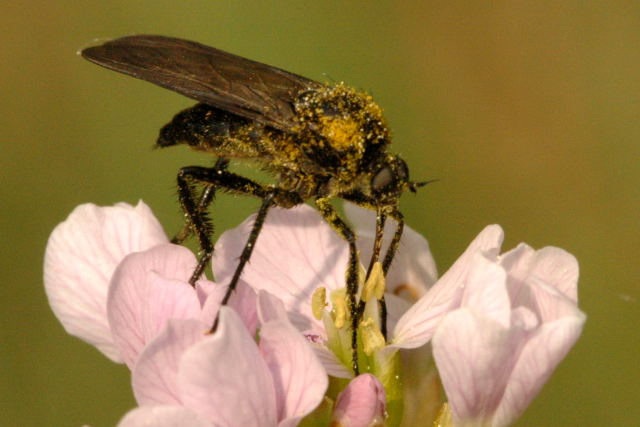

Scientific classification
- Kingdom: Animalia
- Phylum: Arthropoda
- Class: Insecta
- Order: Diptera
- Family: Empididae
- Genus: Empis
- Subgenus: Empis
- Species: E. tanysphyra

Binomial name
- Empis tanysphyra Loew, 1873

= Empis tanysphyra =

Species of flies

Empis tanysphyra is a species of dance flies, in the fly family Empididae. It is included in the subgenus Empis. It is found in most of central and southern Europe.

The wing length is 3.9-4.6 mm for males and 4-4.6 mm for females.
