= Empis univittata =

Scientific classification
- Kingdom: Animalia
- Phylum: Arthropoda
- Clade: Pancrustacea
- Class: Insecta
- Order: Diptera
- Family: Empididae
- Genus: Empis
- Subgenus: Xanthempis
- Species: E. univittata

Binomial name
- Empis univittata Loew, 1867

Species of fly

Empis univittata is a species of fly in the family Empididae. It is included in the subgenus Xanthempis. It is found in the Palearctic.
