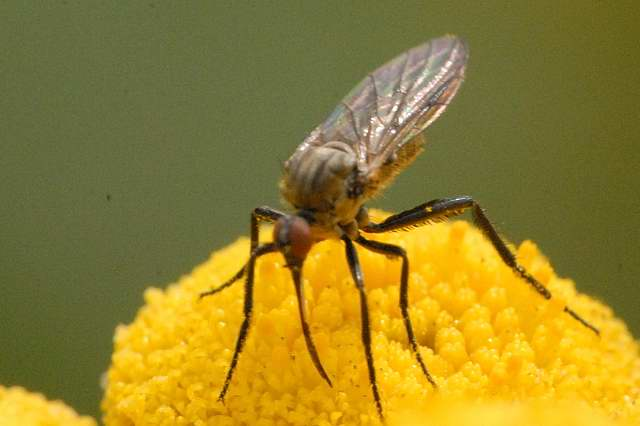
- Empis picipes

Scientific classification
- Kingdom: Animalia
- Phylum: Arthropoda
- Class: Insecta
- Order: Diptera
- Family: Empididae
- Genus: Empis
- Subgenus: Euempis
- Species: E. picipes

Binomial name
- Empis picipes Meigen, 1804

Synonyms
- Empis brevicornis Loew, 1869

= Empis picipes =

Species of fly

Empis picipes is a species of dance flies, in the fly family Empididae. It is included in the subgenus Euempis. It is found from Great Britain east to Poland, Slovakia and Hungary and from Fennoscandia south to Italy. It is not found on the Balkan Peninsula, except Greece.
