= Empis soror =

Scientific classification
- Kingdom: Animalia
- Phylum: Arthropoda
- Class: Insecta
- Order: Diptera
- Family: Empididae
- Genus: Empis
- Subgenus: Polyblepharis
- Species: E. soror

Binomial name
- Empis soror Collin, 1937

Species of fly

Empis soror is a species of fly in the family Empididae. It is included in the subgenus Polyblepharis. It is found in the Palearctic.
