= Empis lindneri =

Scientific classification
- Kingdom: Animalia
- Phylum: Arthropoda
- Clade: Pancrustacea
- Class: Insecta
- Order: Diptera
- Family: Empididae
- Genus: Empis
- Subgenus: Coptophlebia
- Species: E. lindneri

Binomial name
- Empis lindneri Smith, 1967

Species of fly

Empis lindneri is a species of fly in the family Empididae. It is included in the subgenus Coptophlebia of the genus Empis. It is found in the Afrotropic.
