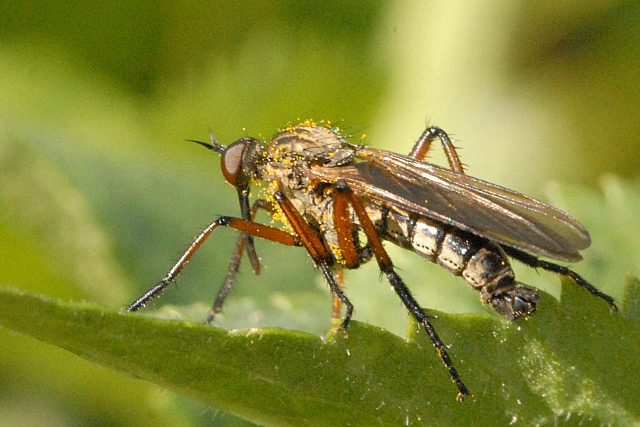

Scientific classification
- Kingdom: Animalia
- Phylum: Arthropoda
- Class: Insecta
- Order: Diptera
- Family: Empididae
- Genus: Empis
- Subgenus: Polyblepharis
- Species: E. opaca

Binomial name
- Empis opaca Meigen, 1804

Synonyms
- Empis affinis Stephens, 1829; Empis unicolor Walker, 1851

= Empis opaca =

Species of fly

Empis opaca is a species of dance flies, in the fly family Empididae. It is found in most of Europe, except the Balkan Peninsula and the Iberian Peninsula.
