= Empis discolor =

Scientific classification
- Kingdom: Animalia
- Phylum: Arthropoda
- Class: Insecta
- Order: Diptera
- Family: Empididae
- Genus: Empis
- Subgenus: Leptempis
- Species: E. discolor

Binomial name
- Empis discolor Loew, 1856

Species of fly

Empis discolor is a species of fly in the family Empididae. It is included in the subgenus Leptempis. It is found in the Palearctic.
