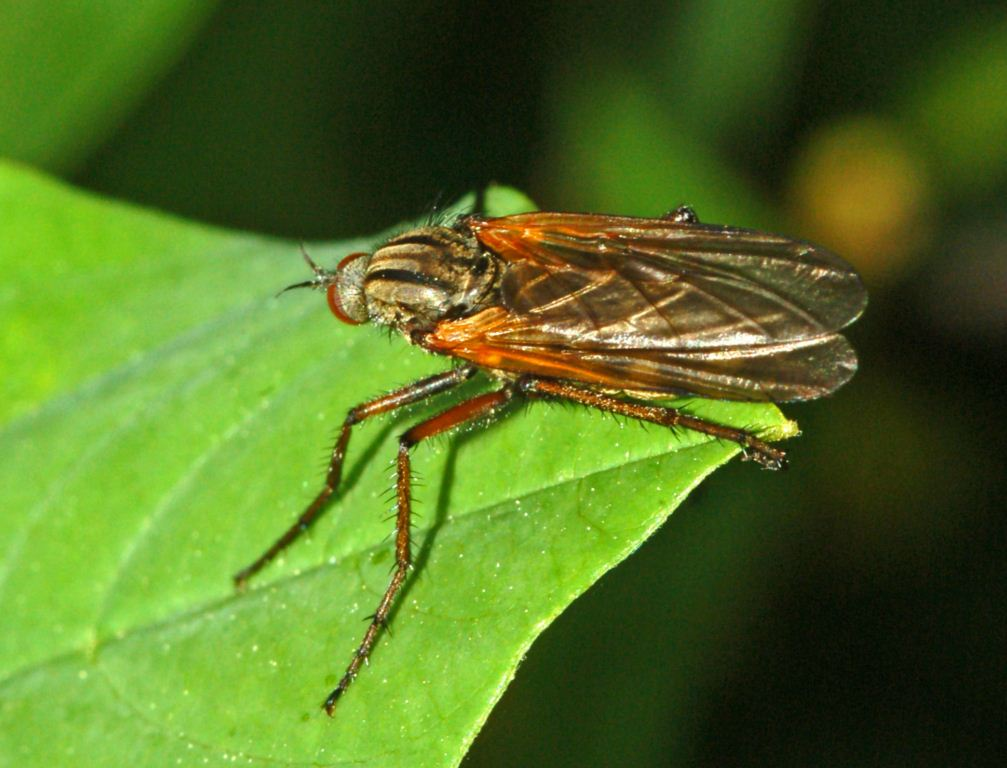
- Empis (Xanthempis) testacea, dorsal view

Scientific classification
- Kingdom: Animalia
- Phylum: Arthropoda
- Clade: Pancrustacea
- Class: Insecta
- Order: Diptera
- Family: Empididae
- Genus: Empis
- Subgenus: Xanthempis
- Species: E. testacea

Binomial name
- Empis testacea Fabricius, 1805

= Empis testacea =

Species of fly

Empis (Xanthempis) testacea is a species of 'dance' flies belonging to the family Empididae subfamily Empidinae.

This species is mainly present in France, Germany, Italy, Spain and the Netherlands.

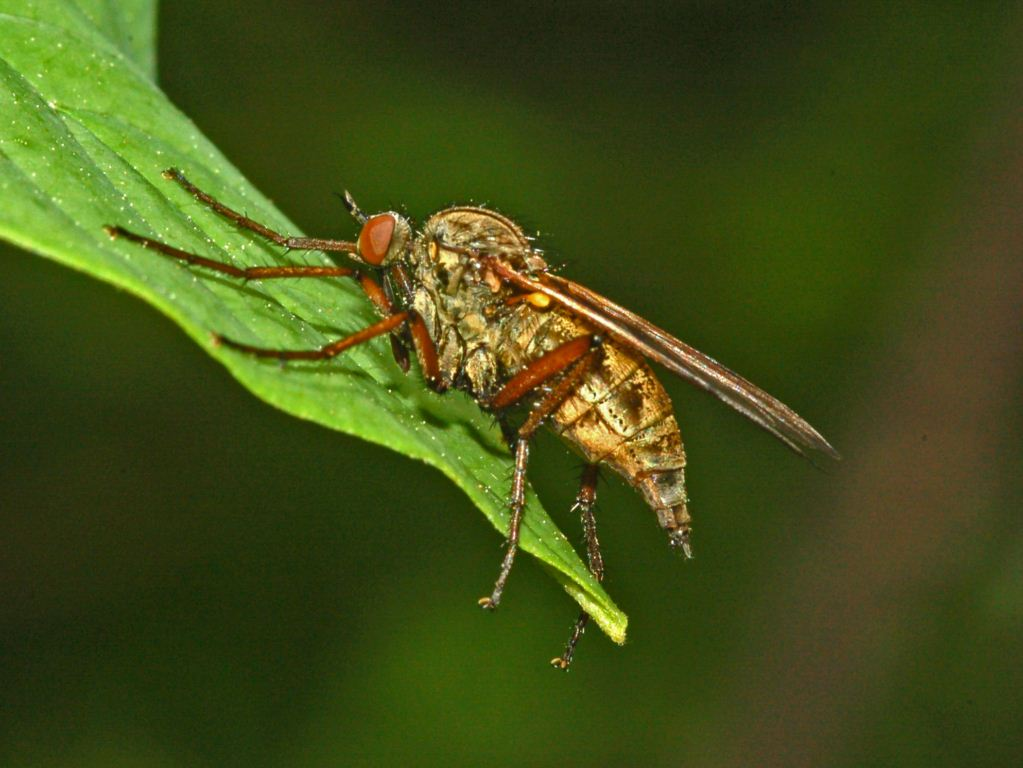
Empis (Xanthempis) testacea, female

The adults grow up to 6–8 millimetres (0.24–0.31 in) long and can mostly be encountered from April through July. This large size fly shows a light grey mesonotum with three dark stripes, wings are clear, yellow at the base with distinct veins, the legs are mainly reddish, while the abdomen is yellowish-brown.
