= Empis praevia =

Scientific classification
- Kingdom: Animalia
- Phylum: Arthropoda
- Class: Insecta
- Order: Diptera
- Family: Empididae
- Genus: Empis
- Subgenus: Empis
- Species: E. praevia

Binomial name
- Empis praevia Collin, 1927

Species of insect

Empis praevia is a species of fly in the family Empididae. It is included in the subgenus Empis. It is found in the Palearctic.
