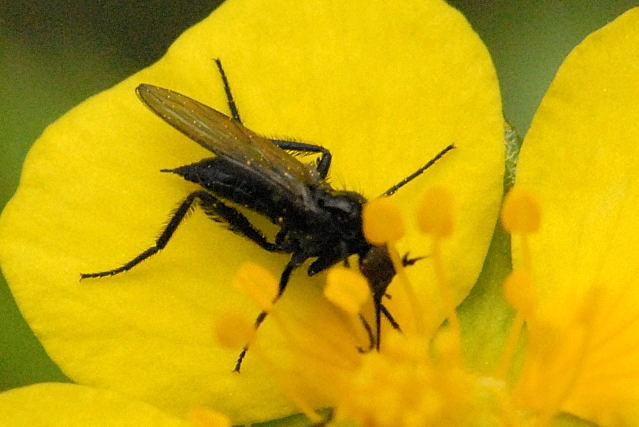

Scientific classification
- Kingdom: Animalia
- Phylum: Arthropoda
- Class: Insecta
- Order: Diptera
- Family: Empididae
- Genus: Empis
- Subgenus: Empis
- Species: E. planetica

Binomial name
- Empis planetica Collin, 1927

= Empis planetica =

Species of fly

Empis planetica is a species of dagger flies, in the fly family Empididae. It is included in the subgenus Empis. It is found in Ireland and Great Britain and from Scandinavia south to Italy.
