= Empis divisa =

Scientific classification
- Kingdom: Animalia
- Phylum: Arthropoda
- Clade: Pancrustacea
- Class: Insecta
- Order: Diptera
- Family: Empididae
- Genus: Empis
- Subgenus: Leptempis
- Species: E. divisa

Binomial name
- Empis divisa Loew, 1869

Species of insect

Empis divisa is a species of fly in the family Empididae. It is included in the subgenus Leptempis. It is found in the Palearctic.
