= Heinrich Scholz (entomologist) =

German entomologist

Heinrich Scholz (1812 in Breslau – 1859) was a German entomologist who specialised in Hemiptera and Diptera.

Heinrich Scholz was a physician.

== Works ==
partial list

- Gravenhorst, J. L. C. and Scholtz, H. 1842: Beobachtungen über die Verwandlung der Schildkäfer (Cassida). Nova acta Academiae Caesareae Leopoldino-Carolinae Germanicae Naturae Curiosorum, Halle/Saale [wechselnde Verlagsorte] - 19 (2) 429–440, Taf. LXXIII
- Scholz H. 1847. Prodromus zur einer Rhynchoten-Fauna von Schlesien, Theil I. Übers. Arb. Veränd. schles. Ges. vaterl. Kult. 1846: 104–164.
- Scholtz, H. 1850: Etwas über die Lebensweise der Tingideen. Zeitschrift für Entomologie herausgegeben von dem Verein für schlesische Insektenkunde zu Breslau, Breslau 4 (2(Nr.14)) 1–4
- Scholtz, H. 1850-1851: Beiträge zur Kunde der schlesischen Zweiflügler. Zeitschrift für Entomologie herausgegeben von dem Verein für schlesische Insektenkunde zu Breslau, Breslau - 4, 5 siehe bei den Einzelteilen

His collection of Hemiptera of Silesia is in the natural history museum of the University of Wrocław
