= Johann Egger =

Austrian entomologist

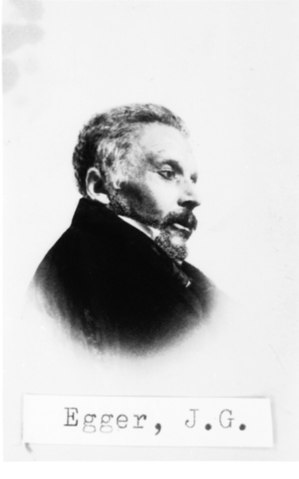
Johann Egger

Johann Nepomuk Georg Egger (15 May 1804, in Salzburg – 19 March 1866, in Vienna), was an Austrian entomologist who specialised in Diptera.

Egger was a court physician in Vienna. Egger wrote only one scientific papers but this is an important reference. His collection is conserved in Naturhistorisches Museum in Vienna.

== Works ==
- Egger, J. (1856). Neue Dipteren-Gattungen und Arten aus der Familie der Tachinarien und Dexiarien nebst einigen andern dipterologischen Verhandlungen des Zoologisch-Botanischen Vereins in Wien 6: 383-392
- Egger, J. (1858). "Dipterologische Beiträge". Verhandlungen der Kaiserlich-Königlichen Zoologisch-Botanischen Gesellschaft in Wien. 8: 701–716.
