= Milan Chvála =

Czech entomologist (1936–2021)

Milan Chvála (1936 in Prague – 2021) was a Czech entomologist who specialised in Diptera.

He was best known for his work on the Empidoidea.

He graduated at the Faculty of Science of the Charles University in Prague in 1960. Since 1991 he was vice dean of the Faculty of Science of the Charles University. He was made a Fellow of the Royal Entomological Society in 1991.

His personal collections of Empidoidea are now in the Hope Entomological Collections at the University of Oxford.

== Selected works ==
Books:

- The horse flies of Europe (Diptera, Tabanidae) (with Leif Lyneborg & Josef Moucha) Copenhagen:Entomological Society of Copenhagen, 1972, 498 pages
- The Tachydromiinae (Diptera. Empididae) of Fennoscandia and Denmark Fauna Entomologica Scandinavica 3, 1975, 336 pages
- The Empidoidea of Fennoscandia and Denmark 2, Fauna Entomologica Scandinavica 12, 1983, 279 pages
- The Empidoidea (Diptera) of Fennoscandia and Denmark III, Fauna Entomologica Scandinavica 29, 1994, 192 pages
- The Empidoidea (Diptera) of Fennoscandia and Denmark IV: Genus Hilara, Fauna Entomologica Scandinavica 29, 2005, 234 pages
- The Types of Diptera (Insecta) described by Pater Gabriel Strobl Studia Dipterologica Supplement 17. 2008, 281 pages
- Monograph of the genus Hilara Meigen (Diptera: Empididae) of the Mediterranean region Studia Dipterologica Supplement 15. 2008, 136 pages.

Articles:

- Monograph of northern and central European species of Platypalpus (Diptera, Hybotidae) with data on the occurrence in Czechoslovakia Acta Univ. Carolinae. Biologica 32. 1989, 209-376pp.
