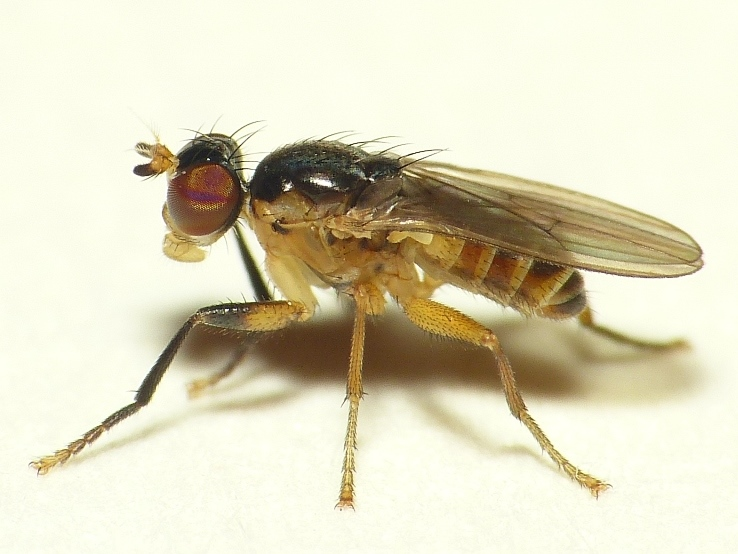
- Colobaea punctata

Scientific classification
- Kingdom: Animalia
- Phylum: Arthropoda
- Class: Insecta
- Order: Diptera
- Family: Sciomyzidae
- Subfamily: Sciomyzinae

= Sciomyzinae =

Subfamily of flies

Sciomyzinae is a subfamily of flies in the family Sciomyzidae.

== Genera ==
- Tribe Sciomyzini

- Apteromicra Papp, 2004
- Atrichomelina Cresson, 1920
- Calliscia Steyskal, 1975
- Colobaea Zetterstedt, 1837
- Ditaeniella Sack, 1939
- Neuzina Marinoni & Knutson, 2004
- Oidematops Cresson, 1920
- Parectinocera Becker, 1919
- Pherbellia Robineau-Desvoidy, 1830
- Pseudomelina Malloch, 1933
- Psacadina Enderlein, 1939
- Pteromicra Lioy, 1864
- Sciomyza Fallén, 1820
- Tetanura Fallén, 1820

- Tribe Tetanocerini

- Anticheta Haliday, 1838
- Chasmacryptum Becker, 1907
- Coremacera Rondani, 1856
- Dichetophora Rondani, 1868
- Dictya Meigen, 1803
- Dictyacium Steyskal, 1956
- Dictyodes Malloch, 1933
- Ectinocera Zetterstedt, 1838
- Elgiva Meigen, 1838
- Ethiolimnia Verbeke, 1950
- Eulimnia Tonnoir & Malloch, 1928
- Euthycera Latreille, 1829
- Euthycerina Malloch, 1933
- Eutrichomelina Steyskal, in Steyskal & Knutson, 1975
- Guatemalia Steyskal, 1960
- Hedria Steyskal, 1954
- Hoplodictya Cresson, 1920
- Hydromya Robineau-Desvoidy, 1830
- Ilione Haliday in Curtis, 1837
- Limnia Robineau-Desvoidy, 1830
- "Neodictya" Elberg, 1965
- Neolimnia Tonnoir & Malloch, 1928
- Oligolimnia Mayer, 1953
- Perilimnia Becker, 1919
- Pherbecta Steyskal, 1956
- Pherbina Robineau-Desvoidy, 1830
- Poecilographa Melander, 1913
- Protodictya Malloch, 1933
- Psacadina Enderlein, 1939
- Renocera Hendel, 1900
- Sepedomerus Steyskal, 1973
- Sepedon Latreille, 1804
- Sepedonea Steyskal, 1973
- Sepedonella Verbeke, 1950
- Sepedoninus Verbeke, 1950
- Shannonia Malloch, 1933
- Steyskalina Knutson, 1999
- Tetanocera Duméril, 1800
- Tetanoceroides Malloch, 1933
- Tetanoptera Verbeke, 1950
- Teutoniomyia Hennig, 1952
- Thecomyia Perty, 1833
- Trypetolimnia Mayer, 1953
- Trypetoptera Hendel, 1900
- Verbekaria Knutson, 1968
