= Colobaea americana =

Scientific classification
- Kingdom: Animalia
- Phylum: Arthropoda
- Class: Insecta
- Order: Diptera
- Family: Sciomyzidae
- Subfamily: Sciomyzinae
- Tribe: Sciomyzini
- Genus: Colobaea
- Species: C. americana

Binomial name
- Colobaea americana Steyskal, 1954

Species of fly

Colobaea americana is a species of marsh fly in the family Sciomyzidae.

== Distribution ==
Canada, United States.
