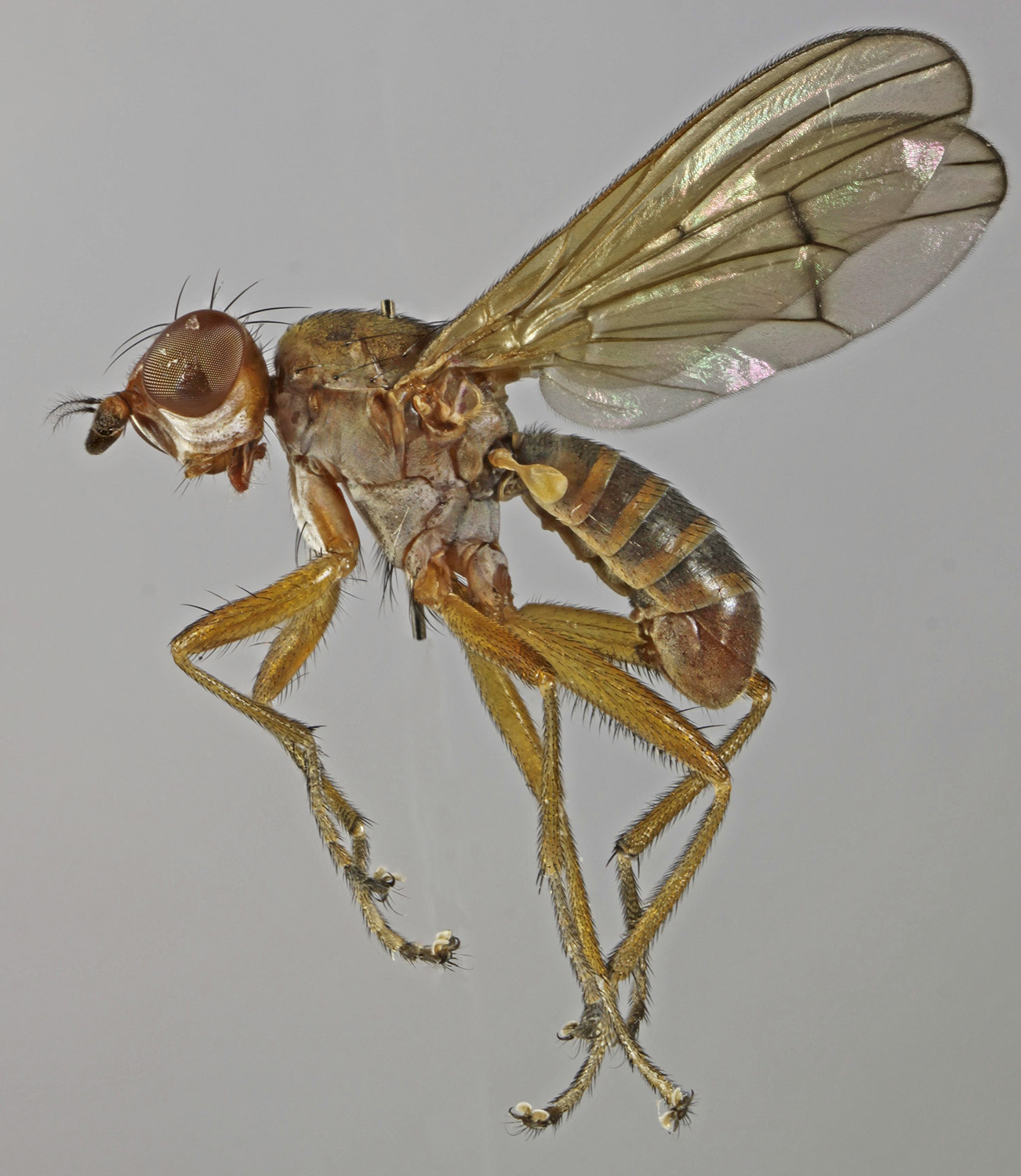
- Renocera pallida North Wales

Scientific classification
- Kingdom: Animalia
- Phylum: Arthropoda
- Class: Insecta
- Order: Diptera
- Family: Sciomyzidae
- Subfamily: Sciomyzinae
- Tribe: Tetanocerini
- Genus: Renocera
- Species: R. pallida

Binomial name
- Renocera pallida (Fallén, 1820)

Synonyms
- Sciomyza pallida Fallén, 1820

= Renocera pallida =

Species of fly

Renocera pallida is a species of fly in the family Sciomyzidae. It is found in the Palearctic

It is 4.5-5.5 mm. long.The interocular space is glossy and on its anterior margin with a white reflection as an extension of the ocellar plate.The orbital plates are grey and shiny; the rest of the interocular space of a reddish matt; epistome as protruding downwards as the cheeks (or peristome).The antennae are rufous (third article burnished at the apex). The body is testaceous with a slight ashy sheen. The tarsi are also burnished. The dark wings have shaded transverse veins. Abdomen burnished. The larvae are predators of Sphaeriidae
