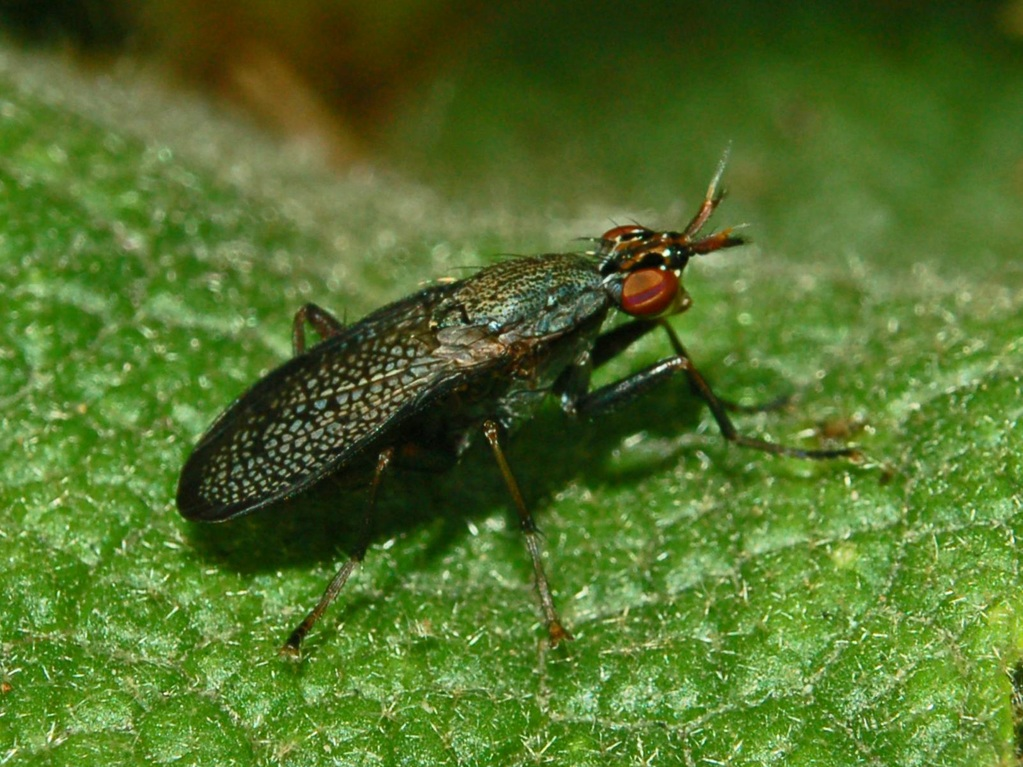
- Coremacera marginata. Dorsal view

Scientific classification
- Kingdom: Animalia
- Phylum: Arthropoda
- Clade: Pancrustacea
- Class: Insecta
- Order: Diptera
- Family: Sciomyzidae
- Subfamily: Sciomyzinae
- Tribe: Tetanocerini
- Genus: Coremacera
- Species: C. marginata

Binomial name
- Coremacera marginata (Fabricius, 1775)

Synonyms
- Musca tristis Harris, 1780; Musca marginata Fabricius, 1775

= Coremacera marginata =

Species of fly

Coremacera marginata is a species of fly in the family Sciomyzidae, the marsh flies or snail-killing flies.

== Subspecies ==
Subspecies include:

- Coremacera marginata var. marginata (Fabricius, 1775)
- Coremacera marginata var. pontica Elberg, 1968

== Distribution and habitat ==
This species occurs in most of Europe and in the Near East. These flies can be encountered in grasslands and woodlands,

== Description ==
The adults of Coremacera marginata grow up to 7–10 millimetres (0.28–0.39 in) long. These flies have a slender, dark greyish body. The prominent eyes are reddish. The brown-yellowish antennae are forward-pointing, with a hairy 3rd segment and a whitish arista. The dark grey wings are mottled with greyish spots.

== Biology ==
Adults feed on nectar or sipping dew. Larvae prey on several terrestrial genera of snails.

== Gallery ==
Coremacera marginata in copula, Hesse, Germany

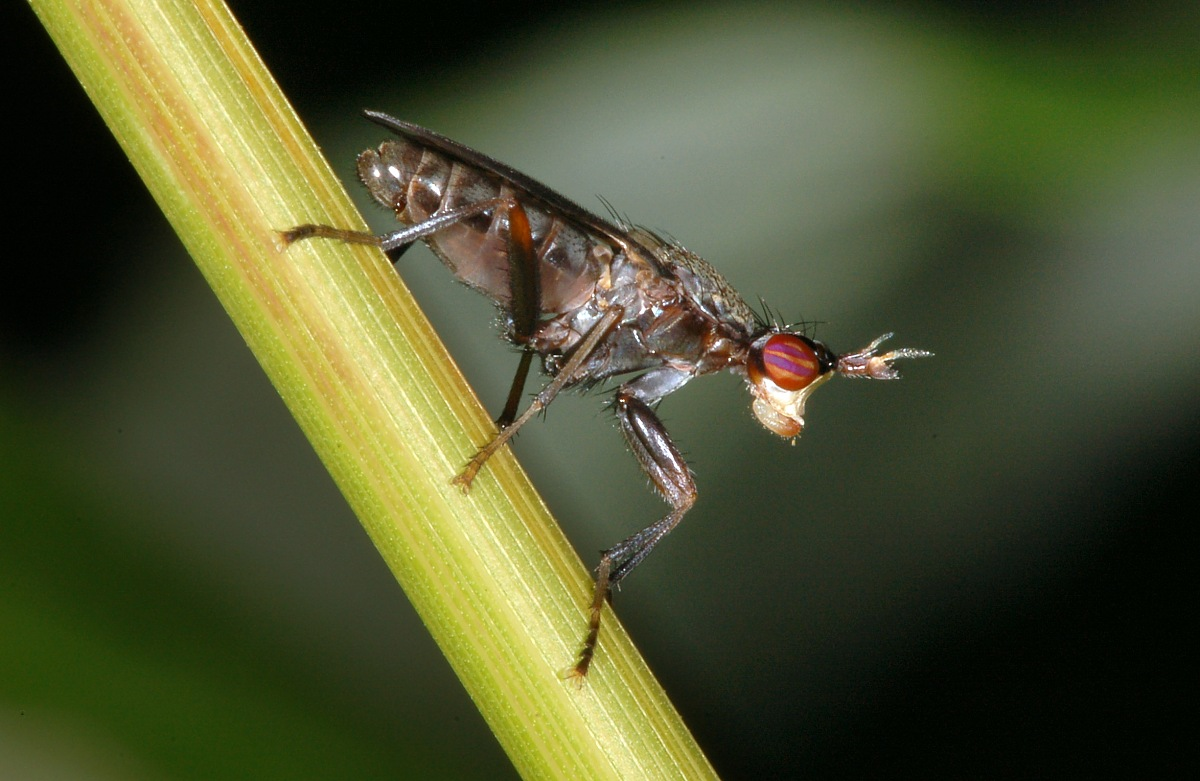
Side view

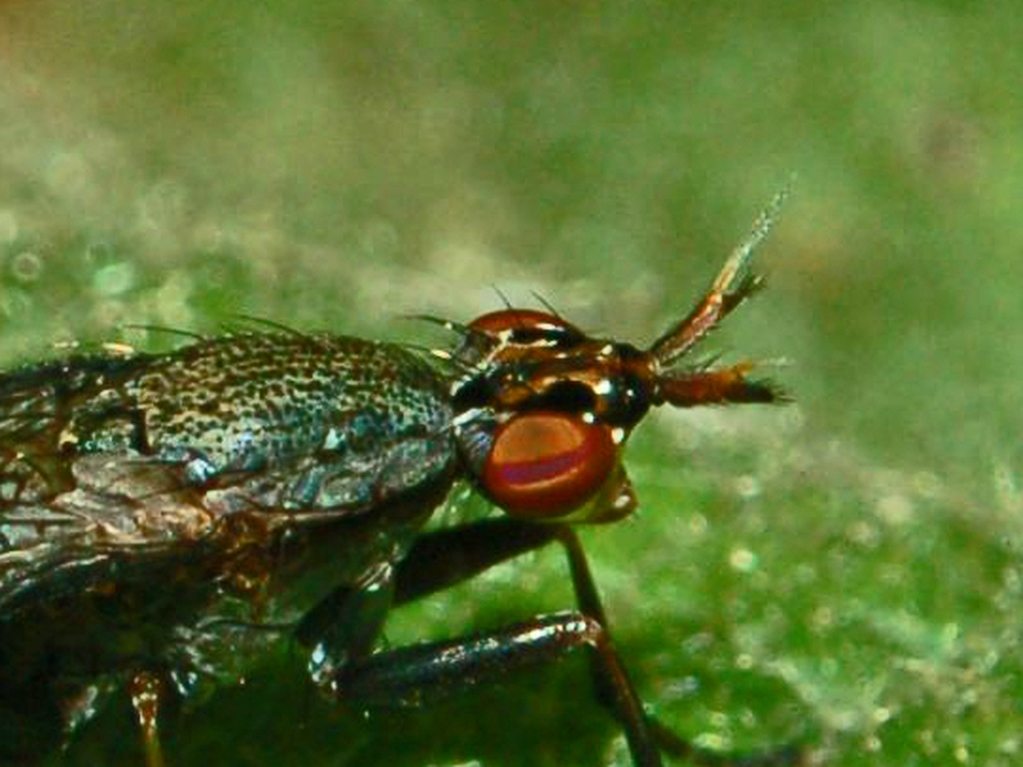
Head with hairy terminal antennae

Close-up of the head
