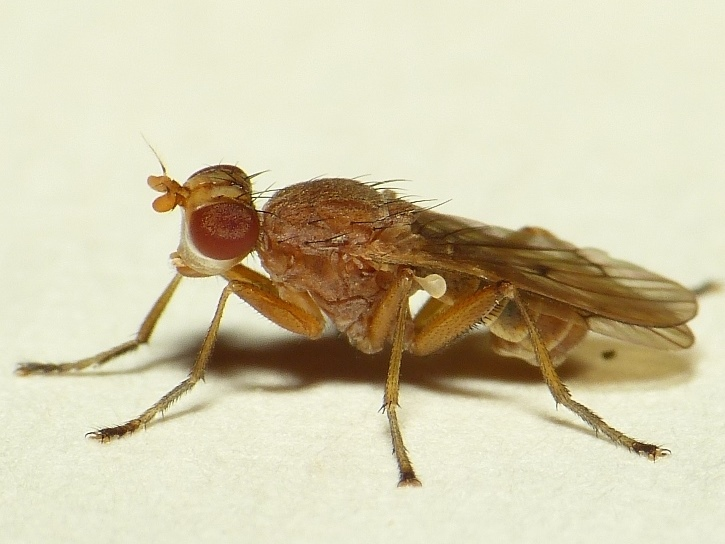
- Renocera stroblii Netherlands

Scientific classification
- Kingdom: Animalia
- Phylum: Arthropoda
- Class: Insecta
- Order: Diptera
- Family: Sciomyzidae
- Subfamily: Sciomyzinae
- Tribe: Tetanocerini
- Genus: Renocera
- Species: R. stroblii

Binomial name
- Renocera stroblii Hendel, 1900

= Renocera stroblii =

Species of fly

Renocera stroblii is a species of fly in the family Sciomyzidae. It is found in the Palearctic
