= Ditaeniella grisescens =

Scientific classification
- Kingdom: Animalia
- Phylum: Arthropoda
- Class: Insecta
- Order: Diptera
- Family: Sciomyzidae
- Subfamily: Sciomyzinae
- Tribe: Sciomyzini
- Genus: Ditaeniella
- Species: D. grisescens

Binomial name
- Ditaeniella grisescens (Meigen, 1830)

Species of fly

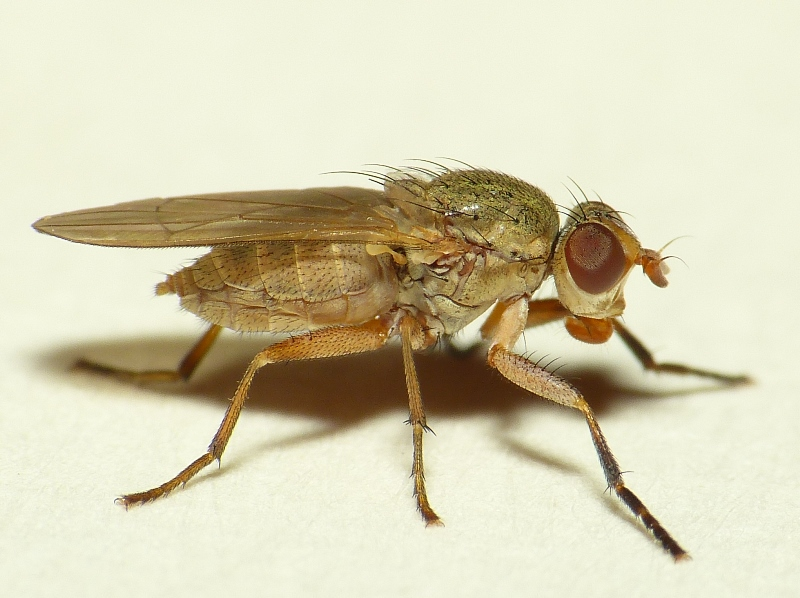
Ditaeniella grisescens

Ditaeniella grisescens is a species of fly in the family Sciomyzidae. It is found in the Palearctic.-Long. : 3.5–4 mm. The body is short, narrow, obscure above, with a rather thick yellowish ashy pruinosity. The legs are rufous with tibiae 1 and their tarsi browned. Wings clear: the subcostal cell yellow. For terms see Morphology of Diptera.
