= Sepedomerus macropus =

Scientific classification
- Kingdom: Animalia
- Phylum: Arthropoda
- Class: Insecta
- Order: Diptera
- Family: Sciomyzidae
- Genus: Sepedomerus
- Species: S. macropus

Binomial name
- Sepedomerus macropus (Walker, 1849)

Synonyms
- Sepedon macropus Walker, 1849; Sepedon nigriventris Wulp, 1897

Species of fly

Sepedomerus macropus, the liverfluke snail predator fly, is a species of marsh fly native to the American tropics and subtropics. Larvae of this species are predators of lymnaeid pond snails, which are vectors of the liver fluke Fasciola gigantica. S. macropus has been introduced to tropical regions outside the Americas (Hawaii, Guam, Thailand) for the purpose of reducing numbers of lymnaeid snails as a public health measure. In Hawaii, introduced S. macropus have become a threat to the survival of native lymnaeid snail species, including the endangered Newcomb's snail.
