= Hoplodictya spinicornis =

Scientific classification
- Domain: Eukaryota
- Kingdom: Animalia
- Phylum: Arthropoda
- Class: Insecta
- Order: Diptera
- Family: Sciomyzidae
- Genus: Hoplodictya
- Species: H. spinicornis

Binomial name
- Hoplodictya spinicornis (Loew, 1866)

Synonyms
- Tetanocera spinicornis Loew, 1866

Species of fly

Hoplodictya spinicornis is a species of marsh fly in the family Sciomyzidae. It is a small, brown fly, typically 3–4 mm., widespread in the southern United States and Mexico, ranging north as far as British Columbia and New Jersey, and south as far as Guatemala and the West Indies.

The larvae of Hoplodictya spinicornis are parasites of land snails such as Oxyloma retusum and Mediappendix avara, feeding on a snail for a few days until it dies and then moving on to a second or third snail. The life cycle of Hoplodictya spinicornis averages around 45 days.
