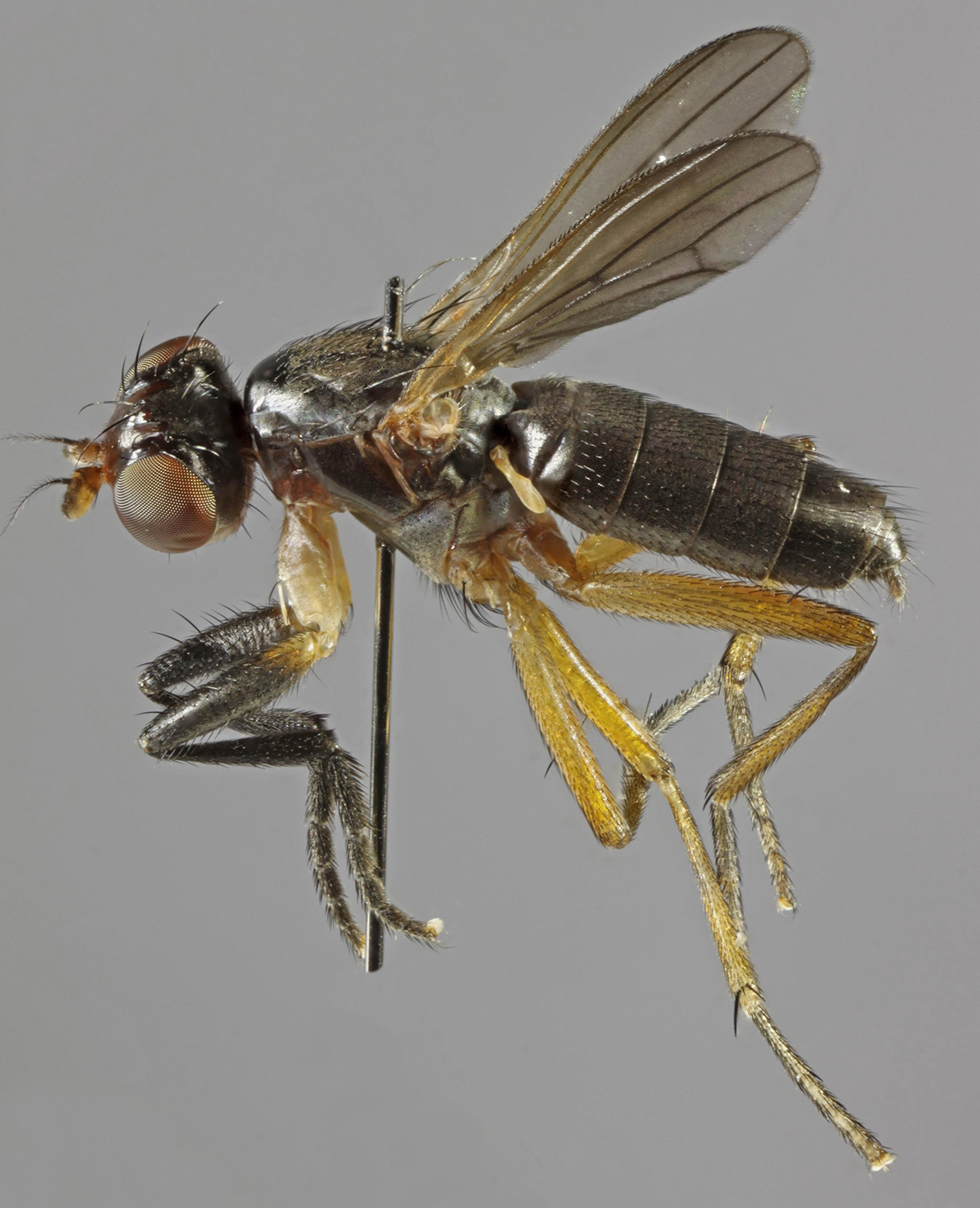
- Pteromicra angustipennis North Wales

Scientific classification
- Kingdom: Animalia
- Phylum: Arthropoda
- Class: Insecta
- Order: Diptera
- Family: Sciomyzidae
- Genus: Pteromicra
- Species: P. angustipennis

Binomial name
- Pteromicra angustipennis (Stæger, 1845)

= Pteromicra angustipennis =

Species of fly

Pteromicra angustipennis is a species of fly in the family Sciomyzidae. It is found in the Palearctic. It is a small sciomyzid (3.5 mm.) with 1 + 2 dorsocentral bristles.The transverse veins of the wings have no shadows but they are distinctly shaded at the apex. The larvae predators of terrestrial snails or stranded freshwater pulmonate snails.
