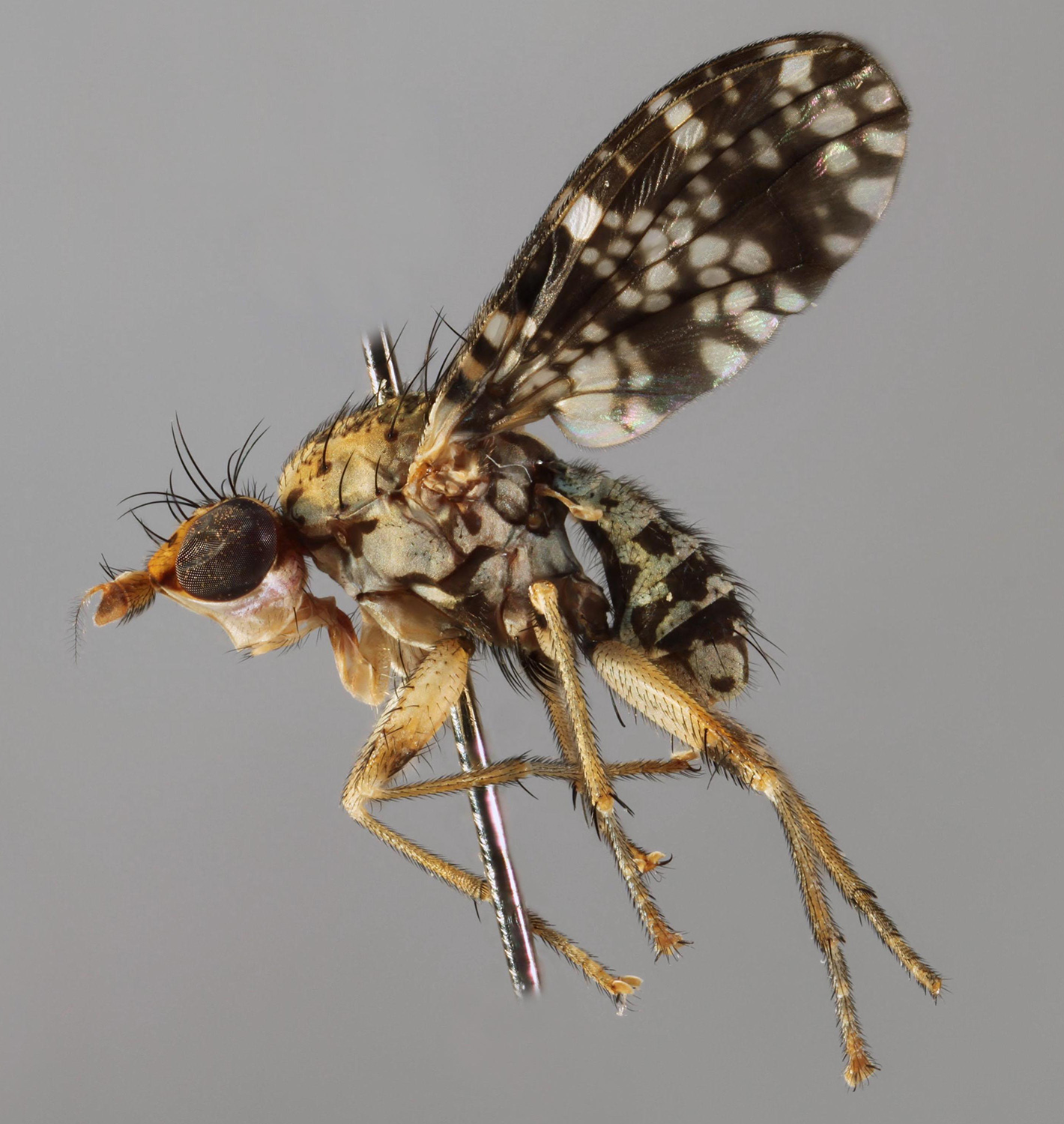
- Trypetoptera punctulata North Wales

Scientific classification
- Kingdom: Animalia
- Phylum: Arthropoda
- Class: Insecta
- Order: Diptera
- Family: Sciomyzidae
- Genus: Trypetoptera
- Species: T. punctulata

Binomial name
- Trypetoptera punctulata (Scopoli, 1763)

= Trypetoptera punctulata =

Species of fly

Trypetoptera punctulata is a species of fly in the family Sciomyzidae. It is found in the Palearctic. Unlike most Sciomyzids, it is found in dry habitats, especially calcareous woodlands and also on grassland and along the edges of streams. The larva preys on Helicidae.

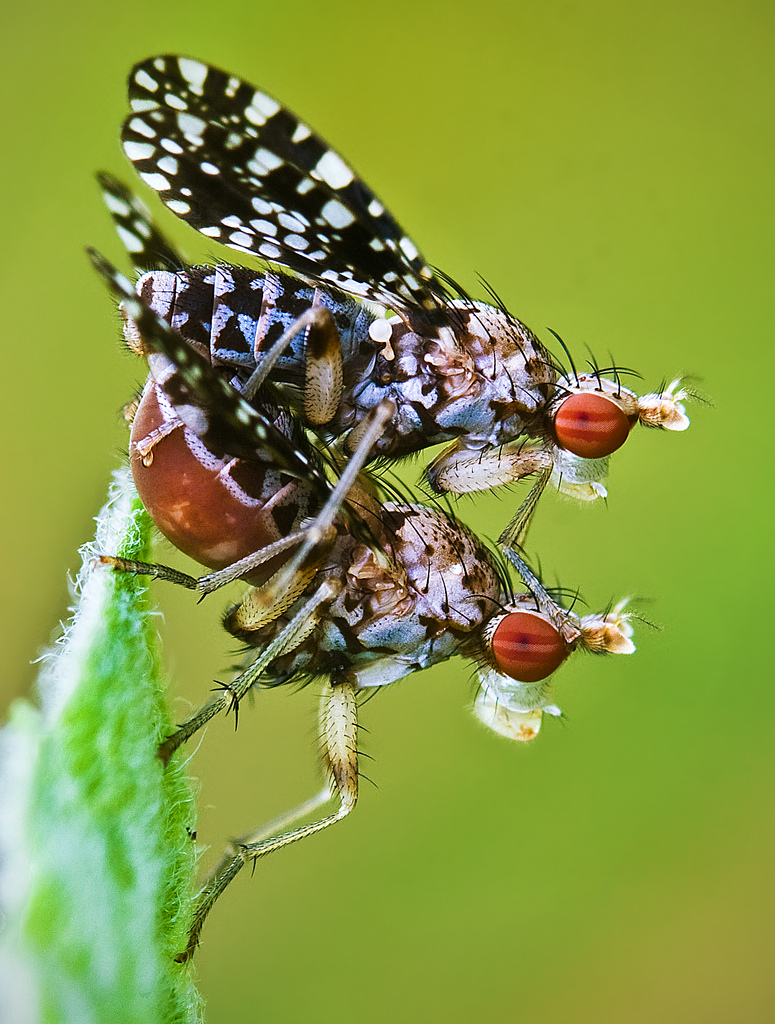

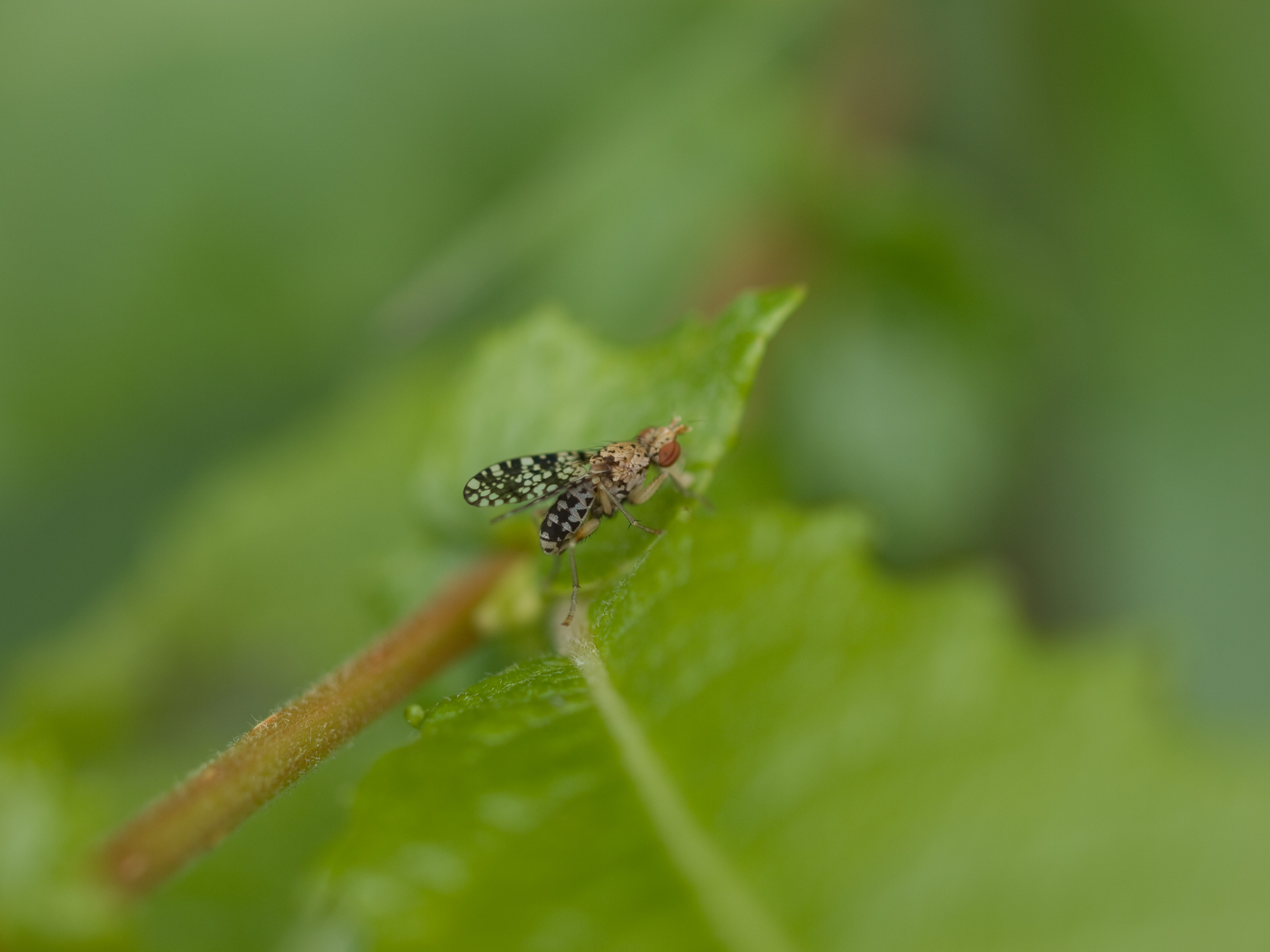

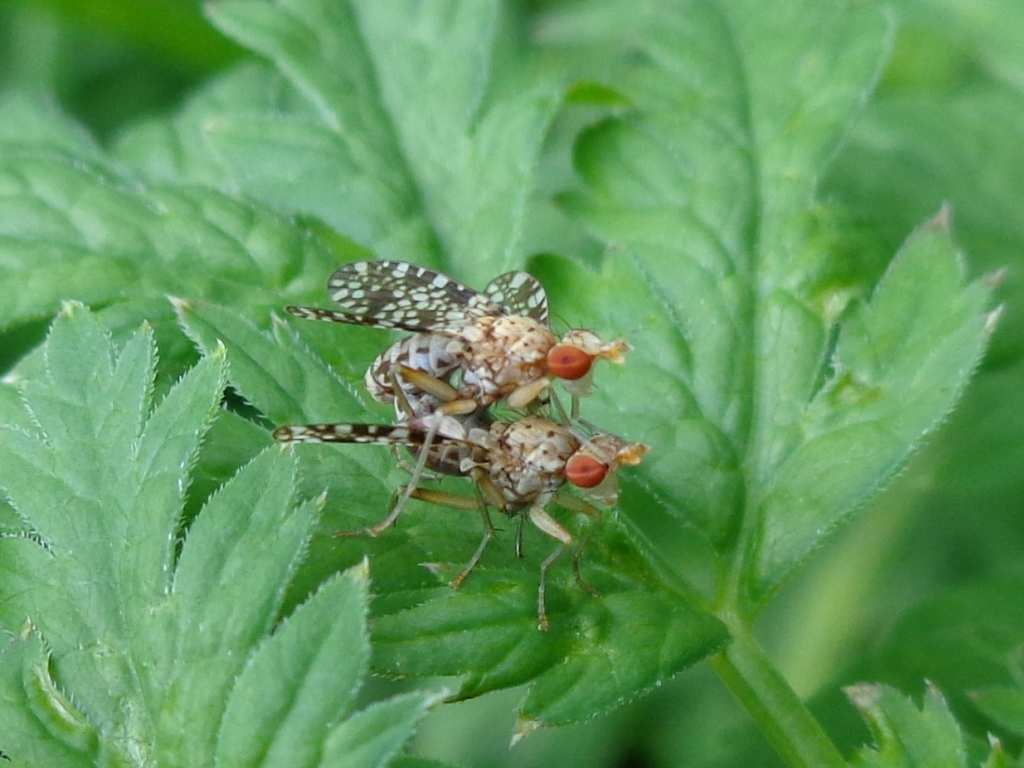
