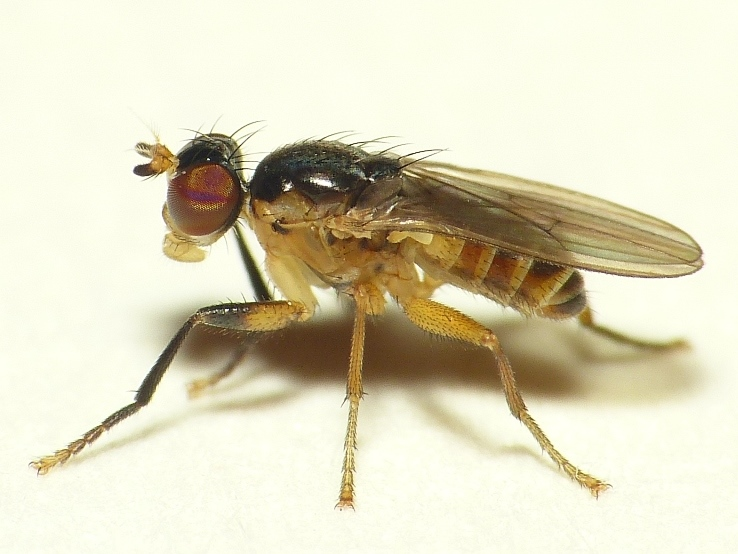
- Colobaea punctata

Scientific classification
- Kingdom: Animalia
- Phylum: Arthropoda
- Class: Insecta
- Order: Diptera
- Family: Sciomyzidae
- Subfamily: Sciomyzinae
- Tribe: Sciomyzini
- Genus: Colobaea
- Species: C. punctata

Binomial name
- Colobaea punctata (Lundbeck, 1923)

Synonyms
- Ctenulus punctatus Lundbeck, 1923

= Colobaea punctata =

Species of fly

Colobaea punctata is a species of marsh fly in the family Sciomyzidae.The second antennal segment is much shorter than the third.The pteropleural macrochaetes are reduced or ciliform. The anal nervure is not shaded. For terms see Morphology of Diptera.

== Distribution ==
Europe, Turkey, Northern Kazakhstan, and eastern Siberia.
