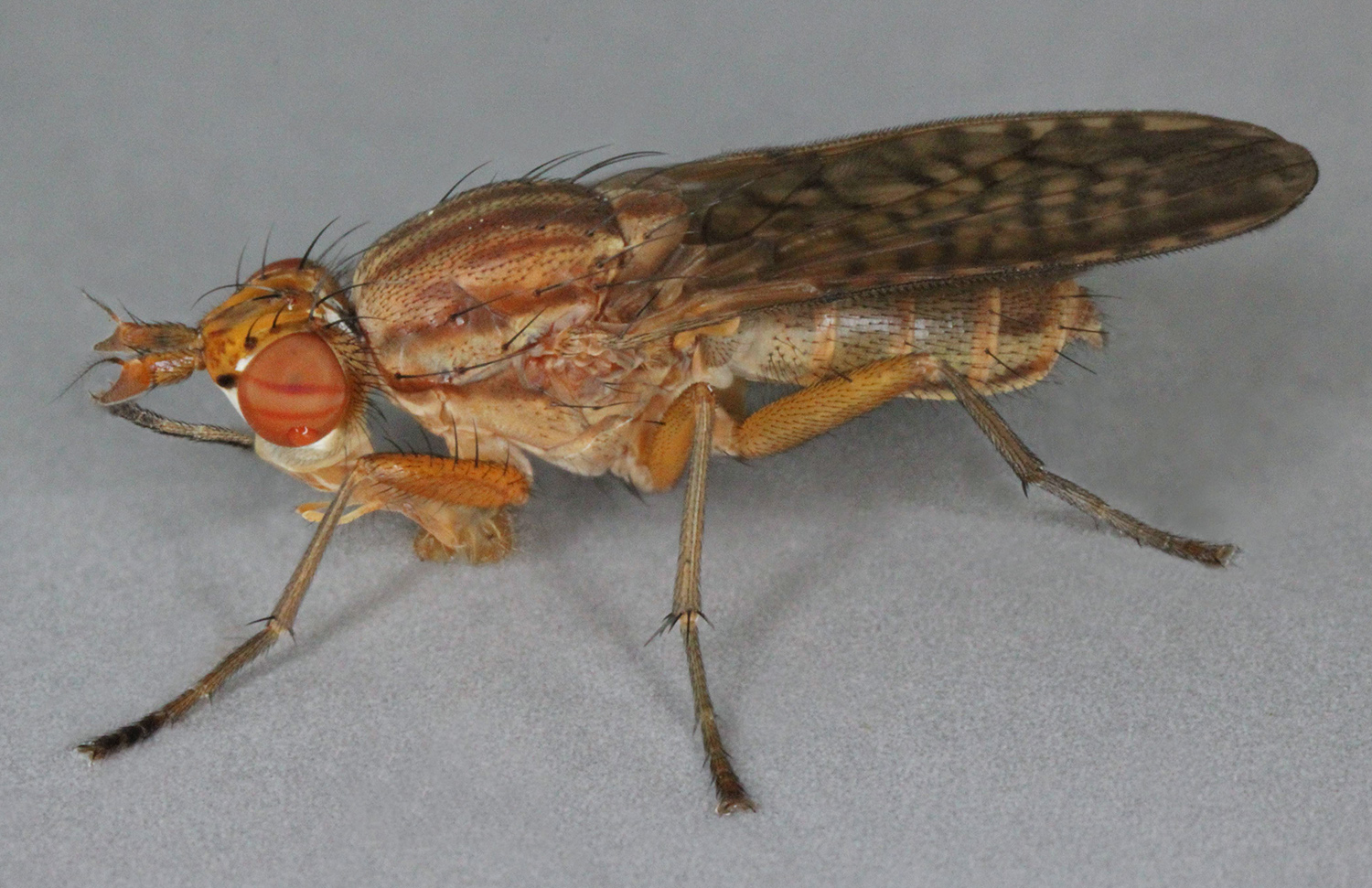
- Pherbina coryleti North Wales

Scientific classification
- Kingdom: Animalia
- Phylum: Arthropoda
- Class: Insecta
- Order: Diptera
- Family: Sciomyzidae
- Genus: Pherbina
- Species: P. coryleti

Binomial name
- Pherbina coryleti (Scopoli, 1763)

= Pherbina coryleti =

Species of fly

Pherbina coryleti is a species of fly in the family Sciomyzidae. It is found in the Palearctic. A large (6.8 to 9.3 mm), largely yellowish and common species of snail-killing flies. Both sexes have heavily shaded wings.The genital armature of males has gonostyli with a tuft of hairs. The larvae are aquatic and predators of freshwater snails.
