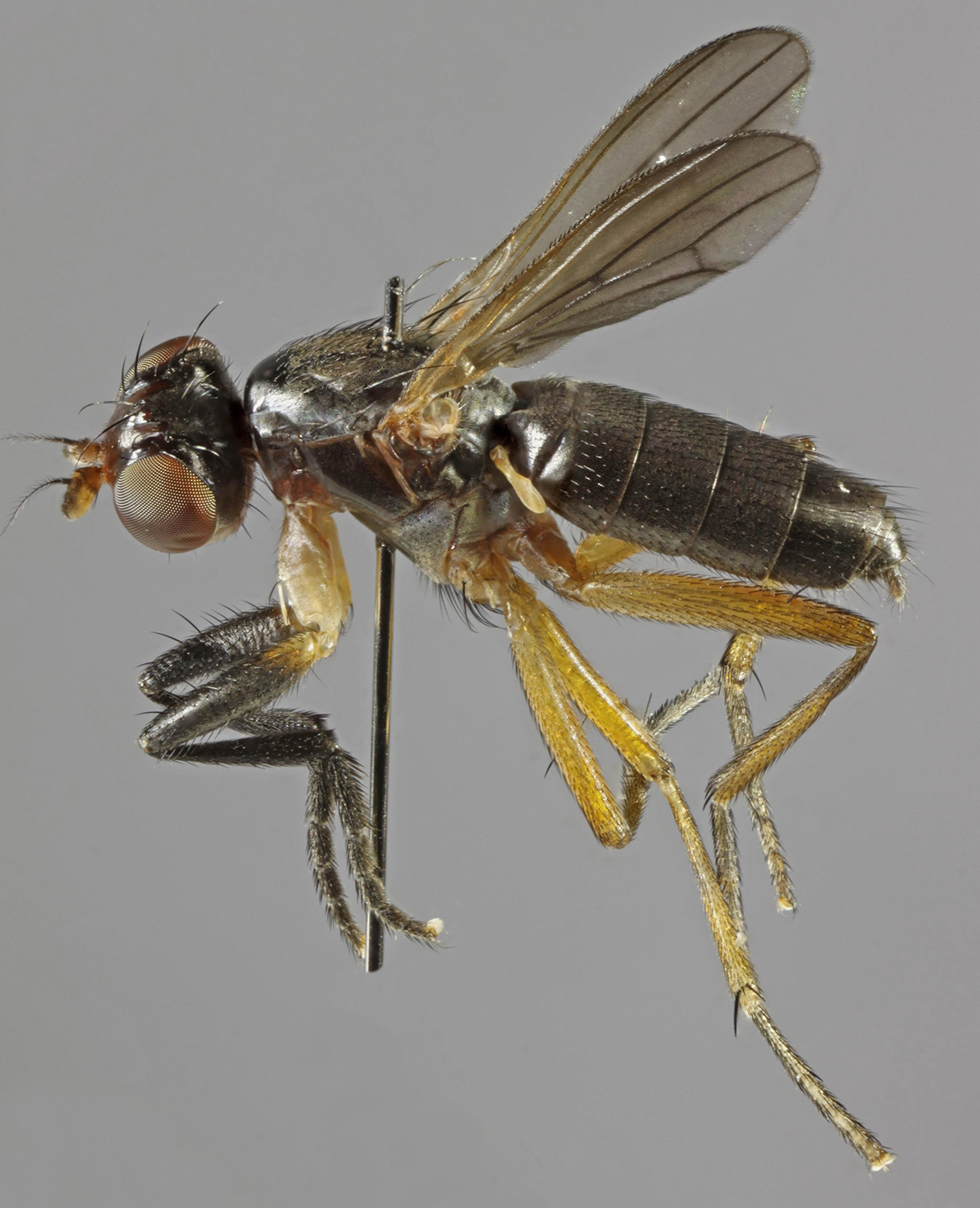
- Pteromicra angustipennis

Scientific classification
- Domain: Eukaryota
- Kingdom: Animalia
- Phylum: Arthropoda
- Class: Insecta
- Order: Diptera
- Family: Sciomyzidae
- Subfamily: Sciomyzinae
- Tribe: Sciomyzini
- Genus: Pteromicra; Lioy, 1864

Type species
- Sciomyza glabricula Fallén, 1820

Synonyms
- Dichrochira Hendel, 1902

= Pteromicra =

Genus of flies

Pteromicra is a genus of flies in the family Sciomyzidae, the marsh flies or snail-killing flies.

== Species ==
- P. angustipennis (Stæger, 1845)
- P. glabricula (Fallén, 1820)
- P. leucopeza (Meigen, 1838)
- P. oldenbergi (Hendel, 1902)
- P. pectorosa (Hendel, 1902)
- P. zariae Knutson, Deeming & Ebejer, 2018
