= Tetanoceroides =

Scientific classification
- Domain: Eukaryota
- Kingdom: Animalia
- Phylum: Arthropoda
- Class: Insecta
- Order: Diptera
- Family: Sciomyzidae
- Subfamily: Sciomyzinae
- Tribe: Tetanocerini
- Genus: Tetanoceroides; Malloch, 1933

Type species
- Tetanoceroides mesopleuralis Malloch, 1933

Genus of flies

Tetanoceroides is a genus of flies in the family Sciomyzidae, the marsh flies or snail-killing flies.

== Species ==
- T. bisetosus (Thomson, 1869)
- T. dentifer Zuska, 1974
- T. fulvithorax Malloch, 1933
- T. mendicus Zuska, 1974
- T. mesopleuralis Malloch, 1933
- T. patagonicus (Thomson, 1869)
- T. simplex Zuska, 1974
