= Dictyodes =

Scientific classification
- Kingdom: Animalia
- Phylum: Arthropoda
- Class: Insecta
- Order: Diptera
- Family: Sciomyzidae
- Subfamily: Sciomyzinae
- Tribe: Tetanocerini
- Genus: Dictyodes; Malloch, 1933

Type species
- Tetanocera dictyodes Wiedemann, 1830

Genus of flies

Dictyodes is a genus of flies in the family Sciomyzidae.

== Species ==
- Dictyodes dictyodes (Wiedemann, 1830)
- Dictyodes platensis Steyskal, 1956
