= Protodictya =

Scientific classification
- Domain: Eukaryota
- Kingdom: Animalia
- Phylum: Arthropoda
- Class: Insecta
- Order: Diptera
- Family: Sciomyzidae
- Subfamily: Sciomyzinae
- Tribe: Tetanocerini
- Genus: Protodictya; Malloch, 1933

Type species
- Protodictya chilensis Malloch, 1933

Genus of flies

Protodictya is a genus of flies in the family Sciomyzidae, the marsh flies or snail-killing flies.

== Species ==
- P. nubilipennis Wulp, 1897
- P. apicalis Steyskal, 1950
- P. bidentata Marinoni & Knutson, 1992
- P. brasiliensis Schiner, 1868
- P. chilensis Malloch, 1933
- P. guttularis Wiedemann, 1830
- P. iguassu Steyskal, 1950
- P. lilloana Steyskal, 1953
