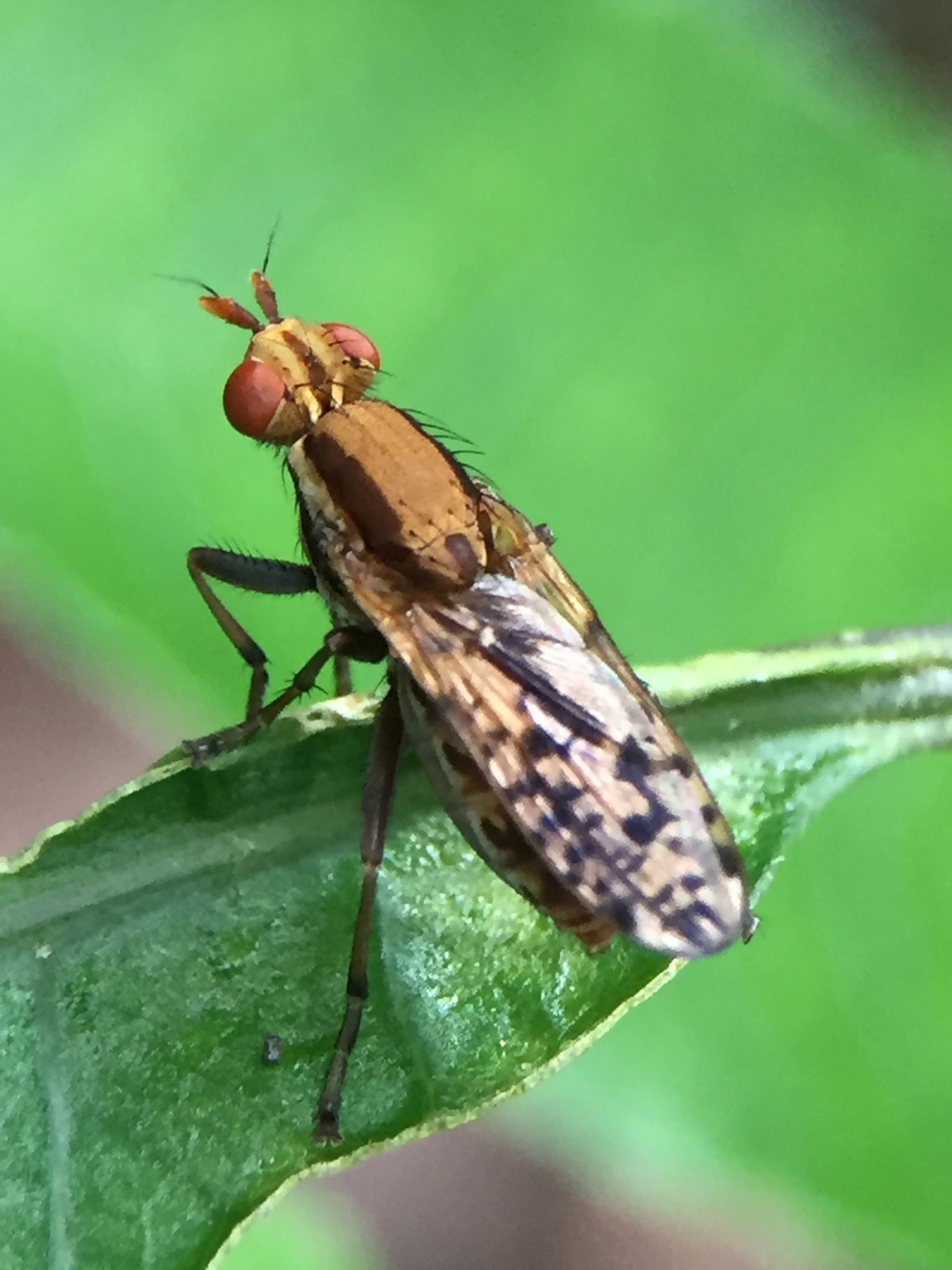
- Neolimnia tranquilla

Scientific classification
- Kingdom: Animalia
- Phylum: Arthropoda
- Class: Insecta
- Order: Diptera
- Family: Sciomyzidae
- Subfamily: Sciomyzinae
- Tribe: Tetanocerini
- Genus: Neolimnia; Tonnoir & Malloch, 1928

Type species
- Sciomyza sigma Walker, 1849

= Neolimnia =

Genus of flies

Neolimnia is a genus of flies in the family Sciomyzidae, the marsh flies or snail-killing flies. It is endemic to New Zealand.

== Species ==
- Subgenus Neolimnia Tonnoir & Malloch, 1928

- N. castanea (Hutton, 1904)
- N. diversa (Hutton, 1904)
- N. irrorata Tonnoir & Malloch, 1928
- N. minuta Tonnoir & Malloch, 1928
- N. obscura (Hutton, 1901)
- N. pepekeiti Barnes, 1979
- N. raiti Barnes, 1979
- N. striata (Hutton, 1904)

- Subgenus Pseudolimnia Tonnoir & Malloch, 1928

- N. repo Barnes, 1979
- N. sigma (Walker, 1849)
- N. tranquilla (Hutton, 1901)
- N. ura Barnes, 1979

- Subgenus Sublimnia Harrison, 1959

- N. nitidiventris Tonnoir & Malloch, 1928
- N. vittata Harrison, 1959
