= Chasmacryptum =

Scientific classification
- Kingdom: Animalia
- Phylum: Arthropoda
- Class: Insecta
- Order: Diptera
- Family: Sciomyzidae
- Subfamily: Sciomyzinae
- Tribe: Tetanocerini
- Genus: Chasmacryptum; Becker, 1907
- Species: C. seriatimpunctatum

Binomial name
- Chasmacryptum seriatimpunctatum Becker, 1907

Genus of flies

Chasmacryptum seriatimpunctatum is a species of fly in the family Sciomyzidae. It is found in the Palearctic. It is the only species in the genus Chasmacryptum.
