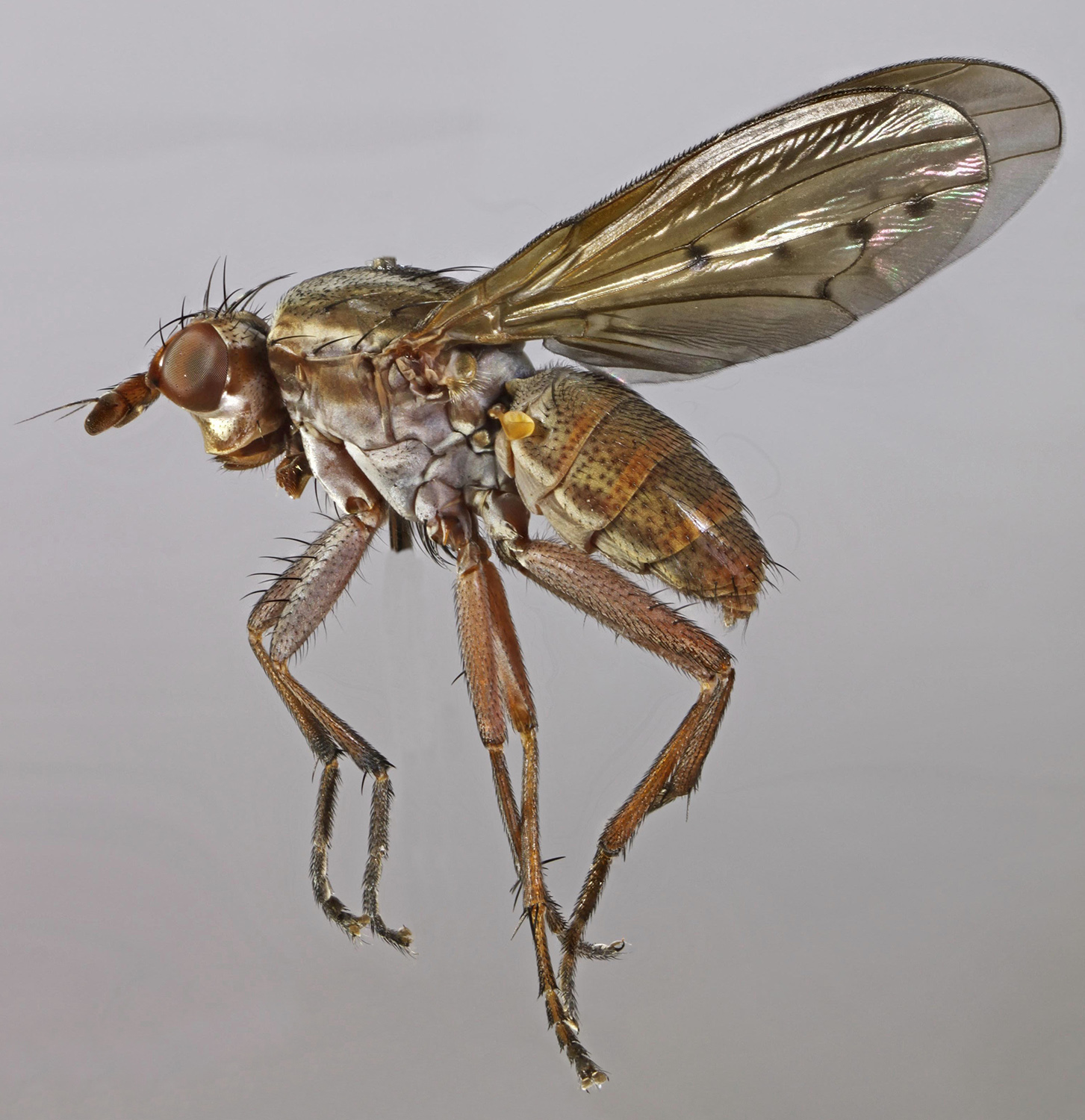
- Hydromya dorsalis North Wales

Scientific classification
- Kingdom: Animalia
- Phylum: Arthropoda
- Class: Insecta
- Order: Diptera
- Family: Sciomyzidae
- Subfamily: Sciomyzinae
- Tribe: Tetanocerini
- Genus: Hydromya; Robineau-Desvoidy, 1830
- Species: H. dorsalis

Binomial name
- Hydromya dorsalis (Fabricius, 1775)

Synonyms
- Musca dorsalis Fabricius, 1775

= Hydromya =

Species of fly

Hydromya dorsalis is a species of fly in the family Sciomyzidae. It is found in the Palearctic. It is the only species in the genus Hydromya. Males have two elongated processes on the anterior margin of the fourth abdominal sternite. Larvae of Hydromya dorsalis are adapted for aquatic life and prey on aquatic pulmonate snails: Galba truncatula, Lymnaea sp. and Stagnicola palustris. Because of this, they are commonly referred to as snail-killing flies. Adults are found on vegetation all year round but the main flight period is April to October. H. dorsalis is known from most of the Palaearctic and some parts of the Afrotropics countries.
