= Sepedomerus =

Scientific classification
- Domain: Eukaryota
- Kingdom: Animalia
- Phylum: Arthropoda
- Class: Insecta
- Order: Diptera
- Family: Sciomyzidae
- Subfamily: Sciomyzinae
- Tribe: Tetanocerini
- Genus: Sepedomerus; Steyskal, 1973

Type species
- Sepedon macropus Walker, 1849

Genus of flies

Sepedomerus is a genus of marsh flies (insects in the family Sciomyzidae). There are at least four described species in Sepedomerus.

== Species ==
- S. bipuncticeps (Malloch, 1933)

- S. bipuncticeps trinidadensis (Steyskal, 1951)

- S. caeruleus (Melander, 1920)
- S. macropus (Walker, 1849) (liverfluke snail predator fly)
