= Salticella =

Scientific classification
- Kingdom: Animalia
- Phylum: Arthropoda
- Class: Insecta
- Order: Diptera
- Family: Sciomyzidae
- Genus: Salticella; Robineau-Desvoidy, 1830

Genus of insects

Salticella is a genus of flies belonging to the family Sciomyzidae.

The species of this genus are found in Europe and Southern Africa.

Species:

- Salticella fasciata (Meigen, 1830)
- Salticella stuckenbergi Verbeke, 1962
