= Pelidnoptera =

Scientific classification
- Domain: Eukaryota
- Kingdom: Animalia
- Phylum: Arthropoda
- Class: Insecta
- Order: Diptera
- Family: Sciomyzidae
- Genus: Pelidnoptera; Rondani, 1856

Genus of flies

Pelidnoptera is a genus of flies belonging to the family Phaeomyiidae.

The species of this genus are found in Europe.

Species:

- Pelidnoptera fuscipennis (Meigen, 1830)
- Pelidnoptera leptiformis (Schiner, 1862)
- Pelidnoptera nigripennis (Fabricius, 1794)
