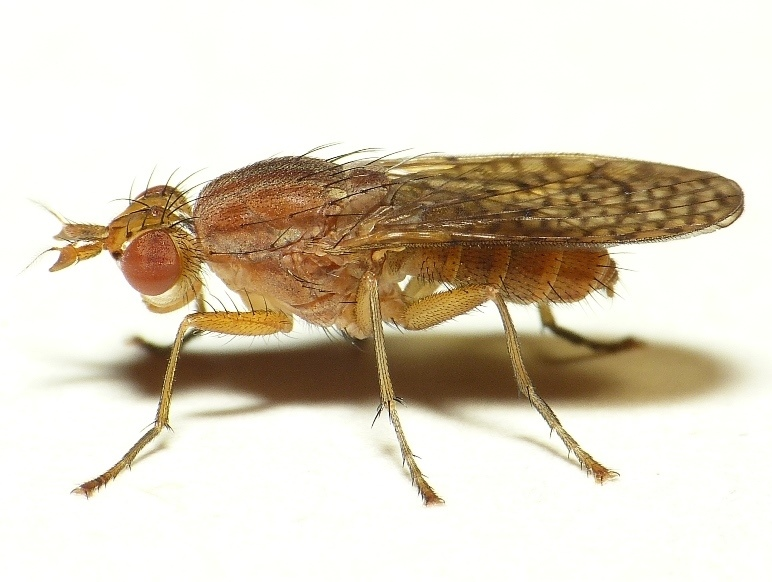
- Pherbina coryleti

Scientific classification
- Domain: Eukaryota
- Kingdom: Animalia
- Phylum: Arthropoda
- Class: Insecta
- Order: Diptera
- Family: Sciomyzidae
- Subfamily: Sciomyzinae
- Tribe: Tetanocerini
- Genus: Pherbina; Robineau-Desvoidy, 1830

Type species
- Musca reticulata Fabricius, 1781

= Pherbina =

Genus of flies

Pherbina is a genus of flies in the family Sciomyzidae, the marsh flies or snail-killing flies.

== Species ==
- P. coryleti (Scopoli, 1763)
- P. intermedia Verbeke, 1948
- P. mediterranea Mayer, 1953
- P. testacea (Sack, 1939)
