= Calliscia =

Scientific classification
- Kingdom: Animalia
- Phylum: Arthropoda
- Class: Insecta
- Order: Diptera
- Family: Sciomyzidae
- Subfamily: Sciomyzinae
- Tribe: Sciomyzini
- Genus: Calliscia; Steyskal, 1975
- Species: C. callisceles

Binomial name
- Calliscia callisceles (Steyskal, 1963)

Synonyms
- Pherbellia callisceles Steyskal, 1963

Species of fly

Calliscia callisceles is a species of fly in the family Sciomyzidae from the Neotropical region, and the only described species in the genus Calliscia.
