= Verbekaria =

Scientific classification
- Domain: Eukaryota
- Kingdom: Animalia
- Phylum: Arthropoda
- Class: Insecta
- Order: Diptera
- Family: Sciomyzidae
- Subfamily: Sciomyzinae
- Tribe: Tetanocerini
- Genus: Verbekaria; Knutson, 1968

Type species
- Verbekaria punctipennis Knutson, 1968

Genus of flies

Verbekaria is an African genus of flies in the family Sciomyzidae, the marsh flies or snail-killing flies.

== Species ==
- V. punctipennis Knutson, 1968
