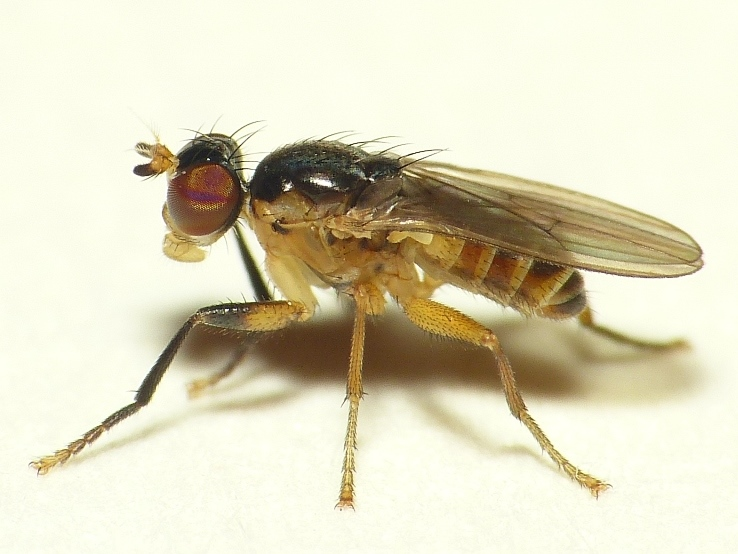
- Colobaea punctata

Scientific classification
- Kingdom: Animalia
- Phylum: Arthropoda
- Class: Insecta
- Order: Diptera
- Family: Sciomyzidae
- Subfamily: Sciomyzinae
- Tribe: Sciomyzini
- Genus: Colobaea; Zetterstedt, 1837

Type species
- Opomyza bifasciella Fallén, 1820

Synonyms
- Ctenulus Rondani, 1856; Melanochira Schiner, 1864

= Colobaea =

Genus of flies

Colobaea is a genus of flies in the family Sciomyzidae, the marsh flies or snail-killing flies.

== Species ==
- C. acuticerca Carles-Tolrá, 2008
- C. americana Steyskal, 1954
- C. beckeri (Hendel, 1902)
- C. bifasciella (Fallén, 1820)
- C. canadensis Knutson & Orth, 1990
- C. distincta (Meigen, 1830)
- C. eos Rozkosny, 1991
- C. flavipleura Rozkosny, 1991
- C. limbata (Hendel, 1933)
- C. montana Knutson & Orth, 1990
- C. nigroaristata Rozkosny, 1984
- C. occidentalis Knutson, Deeming & Ebejer, 2018
- C. pectoralis (Zetterstedt, 1847)
- C. punctata (Lundbeck, 1923)
