= Neuzina diminuta =

Scientific classification
- Domain: Eukaryota
- Kingdom: Animalia
- Phylum: Arthropoda
- Class: Insecta
- Order: Diptera
- Family: Sciomyzidae
- Subfamily: Sciomyzinae
- Tribe: Sciomyzini
- Genus: Neuzina; Marinoni & Knutson, 2004
- Species: N. diminuta

Binomial name
- Neuzina diminuta Marinoni & Knutson, 2004

Species of fly

Neuzina diminuta is a species of fly in the family Sciomyzidae. It is the only species in the genus Neuzina.
