= Guatemalia =

Scientific classification
- Kingdom: Animalia
- Phylum: Arthropoda
- Class: Insecta
- Order: Diptera
- Family: Sciomyzidae
- Subfamily: Sciomyzinae
- Tribe: Tetanocerini
- Genus: Guatemalia; Steyskal, 1960

Type species
- Guatemalia straminata Wulp, 1897

Genus of flies

Guatemalia is a genus of flies in the family Sciomyzidae.

== Species ==
- Guatemalia nigritarsis Marinoni, 1992
- Guatemalia straminata (Wulp, 1897)
