= Atrichomelina =

Scientific classification
- Kingdom: Animalia
- Phylum: Arthropoda
- Class: Insecta
- Order: Diptera
- Family: Sciomyzidae
- Subfamily: Sciomyzinae
- Tribe: Sciomyzini
- Genus: Atrichomelina; Cresson, 1920

Type species
- Sciomyza pubera Loew, 1862

Genus of flies

Atrichomelina is a genus of flies in the family Sciomyzidae, the marsh flies or snail-killing flies.

== Biology ==
The larvae kill and consume aquatic pulmonate snails of various species.

== Species ==
- Atrichomelina pubera (Loew, 1862)
