= Pseudomelina =

Scientific classification
- Domain: Eukaryota
- Kingdom: Animalia
- Phylum: Arthropoda
- Class: Insecta
- Order: Diptera
- Family: Sciomyzidae
- Subfamily: Sciomyzinae
- Tribe: Sciomyzini
- Genus: Pseudomelina; Malloch, 1933
- Species: P. apicalis

Binomial name
- Pseudomelina apicalis Malloch, 1933

Species of fly

Pseudomelina apicalis is a species of fly in the family Sciomyzidae.
