= Trypetolimnia =

Scientific classification
- Domain: Eukaryota
- Kingdom: Animalia
- Phylum: Arthropoda
- Class: Insecta
- Order: Diptera
- Family: Sciomyzidae
- Subfamily: Sciomyzinae
- Tribe: Tetanocerini
- Genus: Trypetolimnia; Mayer, 1953
- Species: T. rossica

Binomial name
- Trypetolimnia rossica Mayer, 1953

Species of fly

Trypetolimnia rossica is a species of fly in the family Sciomyzidae and the only known species in the genus Trypetolimnia.
