= Thecomyia =

Scientific classification
- Domain: Eukaryota
- Kingdom: Animalia
- Phylum: Arthropoda
- Class: Insecta
- Order: Diptera
- Family: Sciomyzidae
- Subfamily: Sciomyzinae
- Tribe: Tetanocerini
- Genus: Thecomyia; Perty, 1833

Type species
- Thecomyia longicornis Perty, 1833

Genus of flies

Thecomyia is a Neotropical genus of flies in the family Sciomyzidae, the marsh flies or snail-killing flies.

== Species ==
- T. abercrombiei Marinoni & Steyskal, 2003
- T. autazensis Marinoni & Steyskal, 2003
- T. bonattoi Marinoni & Steyskal, 2003
- T. chrysacra Marinoni & Steyskal, 2003
- T. diederiki Mortelmans, 2018
- T. lateralis (Walker, 1858)
- T. limbata (Wiedemann, 1819)
- T. longicornis Perty, 1833
- T. mathisi Marinoni & Steyskal, 2003
- T. naponica Marinoni & Steyskal, 2003
- T. papaveroi Marinoni & Steyskal, 2003
- T. signorelli Marinoni & Steyskal, 2003
- T. tricuneata Marinoni & Steyskal, 2003
