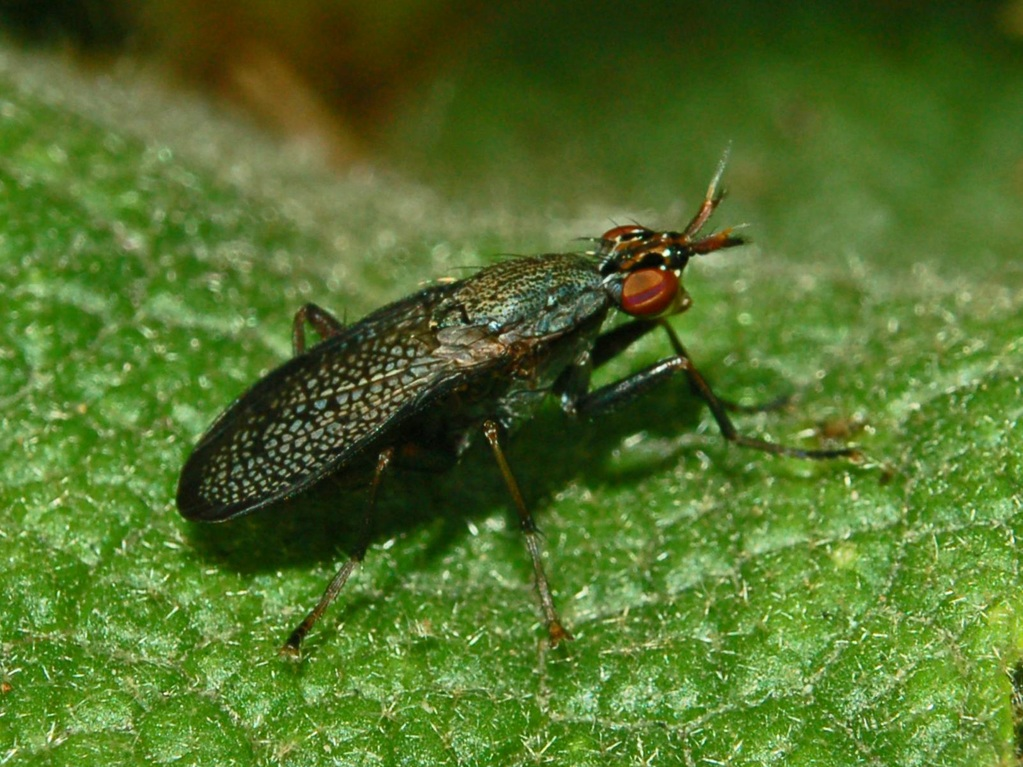
- Coremacera marginata

Scientific classification
- Kingdom: Animalia
- Phylum: Arthropoda
- Clade: Pancrustacea
- Class: Insecta
- Order: Diptera
- Family: Sciomyzidae
- Subfamily: Sciomyzinae
- Tribe: Tetanocerini
- Genus: Coremacera; Rondani, 1856

Type species
- Musca marginata Fabricius, 1775

Synonyms
- Statinia Meigen, 1800

= Coremacera =

Genus of flies

Coremacera is a genus of flies in the family Sciomyzidae, the marsh flies or snail-killing flies.

== Species ==
BioLib includes;

1. Coremacera amoena (Loew, 1835)
2. C. bivittata (Macquart, 1835)
3. C. catenata (Loew, 1847)
4. C. confluens Rondani, 1868
5. C. fabricii Rozkošný, 1981
6. C. halensis (Loew, 1864)
7. C. marginata (Fabricius, 1775) - type species
8. C. obscuripennis (Loew, 1845)
9. C. scutellata (Matsumura, 1916)
10. C. trivittata (Loew, 1860)
11. C. turkestanica (Elberg, 1968)
12. C. ussuriensis (Elberg, 1968)
