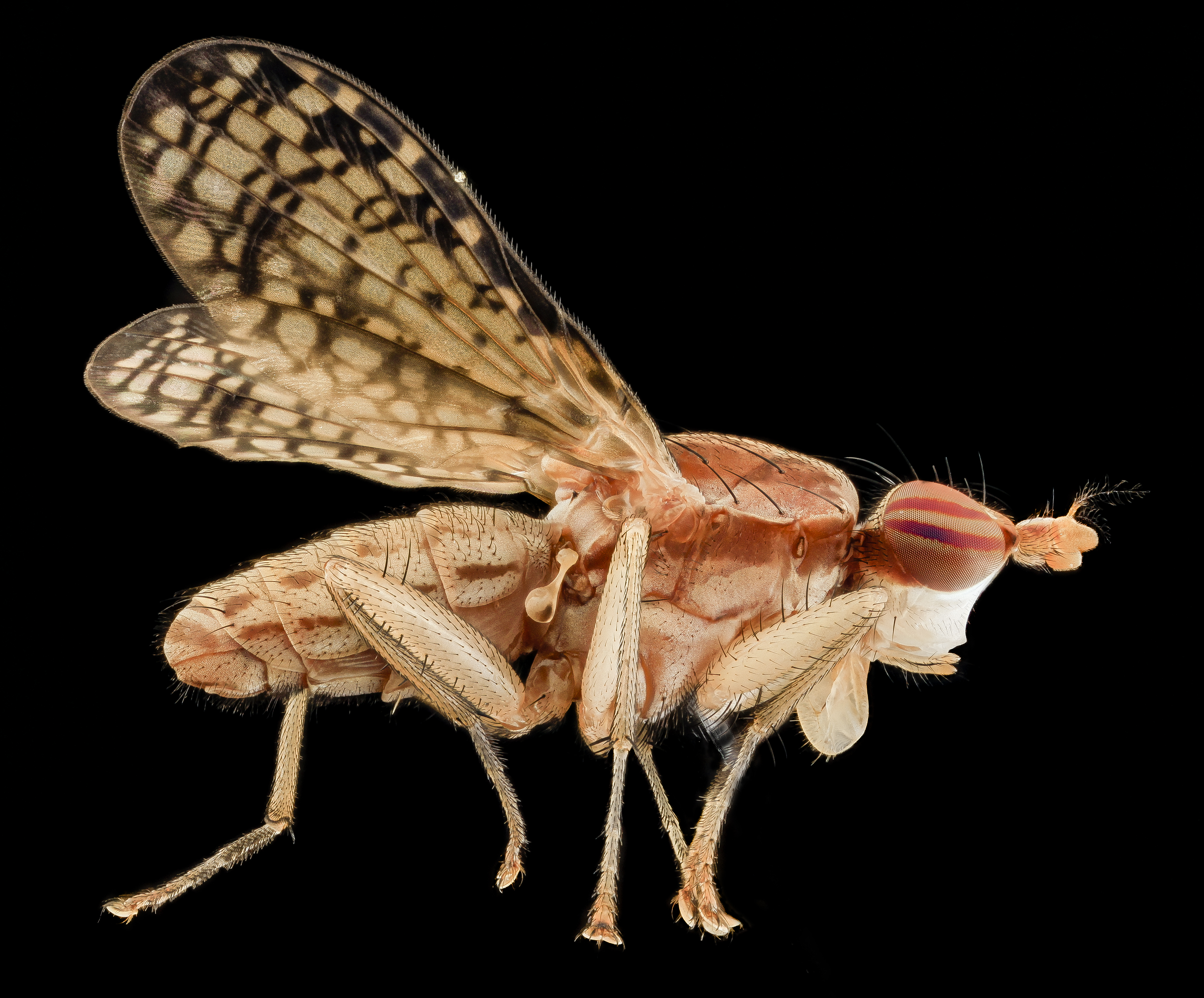

Scientific classification
- Domain: Eukaryota
- Kingdom: Animalia
- Phylum: Arthropoda
- Class: Insecta
- Order: Diptera
- Family: Sciomyzidae
- Genus: Trypetoptera
- Species: T. canadensis

Binomial name
- Trypetoptera canadensis (Macquart, 1843)

Synonyms
- Tetanocera canadensis Macquart, 1843; Tetanocera pallida Loew, 1859

= Trypetoptera canadensis =

Species of fly

Trypetoptera canadensis is a species of marsh fly in the family Sciomyzidae.
