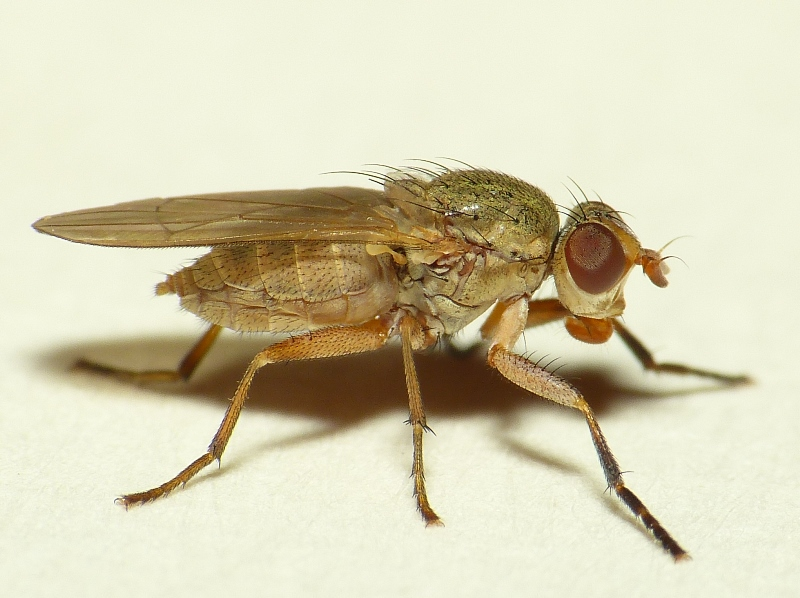
- Ditaeniella grisescens

Scientific classification
- Domain: Eukaryota
- Kingdom: Animalia
- Phylum: Arthropoda
- Class: Insecta
- Order: Diptera
- Family: Sciomyzidae
- Subfamily: Sciomyzinae
- Tribe: Sciomyzini
- Genus: Ditaeniella; Sack, 1939

Type species
- Sciomyza grisescens Meigen, 1830

= Ditaeniella =

Genus of flies

Ditaeniella is a genus of flies in the family Sciomyzidae, the marsh flies or snail-killing flies.

== Species ==
- D. grisescens (Meigen, 1830)
- D. parallela (Walker, 1853)
- D. patagoniensis (Macquart, 1851)
- D. trivittata (Cresson, 1920)
