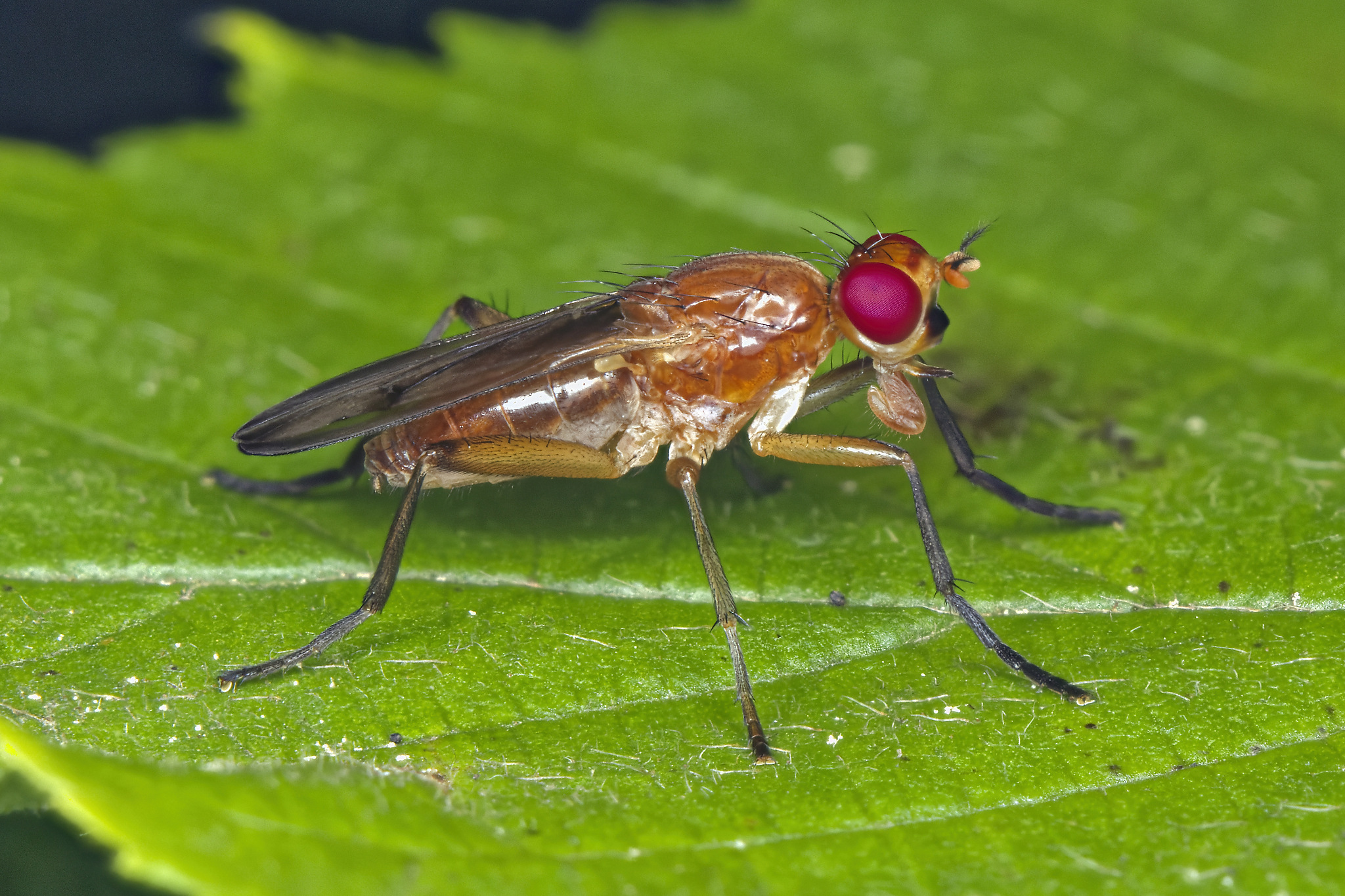
- Sciomyza aristalis

Scientific classification
- Domain: Eukaryota
- Kingdom: Animalia
- Phylum: Arthropoda
- Class: Insecta
- Order: Diptera
- Family: Sciomyzidae
- Subfamily: Sciomyzinae
- Tribe: Sciomyzini
- Genus: Sciomyza; Fallén, 1820

Type species
- Sciomyza simplex Fallén, 1820

Synonyms
- Bischofia Hendel, 1902

= Sciomyza =

Genus of flies

Sciomyza is a genus of flies in the family Sciomyzidae, the marsh flies or snail-killing flies.

== Species ==
- S. aristalis (Coquillett, 1901)
- S. dryomyzina Zetterstedt, 1846
- S. pulchra Roller, 1996
- S. sebezhica Przhiboro, 2001
- S. simplex Fallén, 1820
- S. testacea Macquart, 1835
- S. varia (Coquillett, 1904)
