= Parectinocera =

Scientific classification
- Domain: Eukaryota
- Kingdom: Animalia
- Phylum: Arthropoda
- Class: Insecta
- Order: Diptera
- Family: Sciomyzidae
- Subfamily: Sciomyzinae
- Tribe: Sciomyzini
- Genus: Parectinocera; Becker, 1919

Type species
- Parectinocera neotropica Becker, 1919

Genus of flies

Parectinocera is a genus of flies in the family Sciomyzidae, the marsh flies or snail-killing flies. The genus was first described by Theodor Becker in 1919.

== Species ==
- Parectinocera dissimilis (Malloch, 1933)
- Parectinocera inaequalis (Malloch, 1933)
- Parectinocera neotropica Becker, 1919
