= Hedria =

Scientific classification
- Domain: Eukaryota
- Kingdom: Animalia
- Phylum: Arthropoda
- Class: Insecta
- Order: Diptera
- Family: Sciomyzidae
- Subfamily: Sciomyzinae
- Tribe: Tetanocerini
- Genus: Hedria; Steyskal, 1954

Type species
- Hedria mixta Steyskal, 1954

Genus of flies

Hedria is a genus of flies in the family Sciomyzidae. There is one described species in Hedria, H. mixta.
