= Steyskalina =

Scientific classification
- Kingdom: Animalia
- Phylum: Arthropoda
- Class: Insecta
- Order: Diptera
- Family: Sciomyzidae
- Subfamily: Sciomyzinae
- Tribe: Tetanocerini
- Genus: Steyskalina; Knutson, 1999
- Species: S. picta

Binomial name
- Steyskalina picta Ghorpade & Marinoni, 1999

Genus of flies

Steyskalina picta is a species of fly in the family Sciomyzidae which lives in the Orient. It is the only species in the genus Steyskalina.
