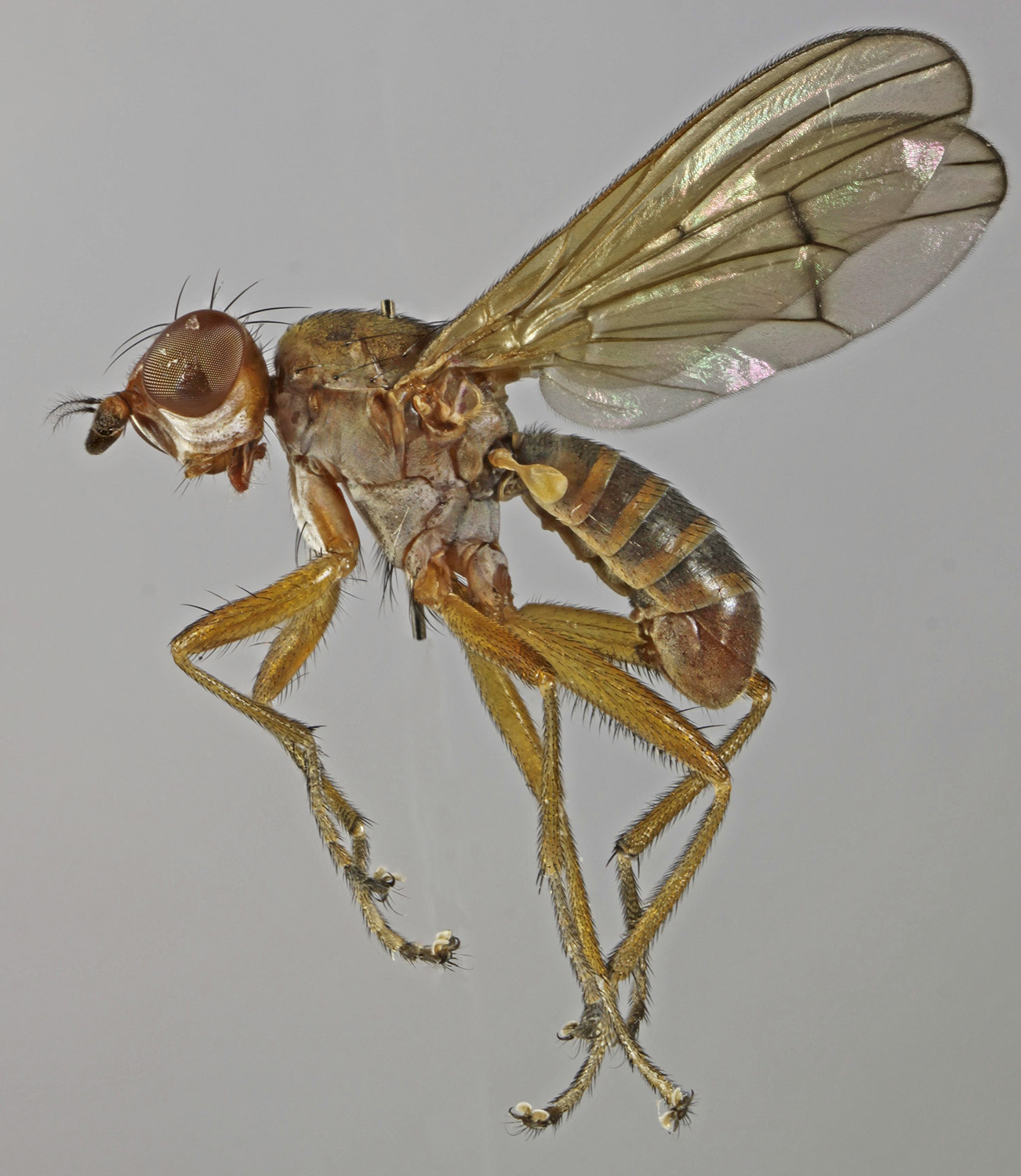
- Renocera pallida North Wales

Scientific classification
- Domain: Eukaryota
- Kingdom: Animalia
- Phylum: Arthropoda
- Class: Insecta
- Order: Diptera
- Family: Sciomyzidae
- Subfamily: Sciomyzinae
- Tribe: Tetanocerini
- Genus: Renocera; Hendel, 1900

= Renocera =

Genus of flies

Renocera is a genus of flies in the family Sciomyzidae. There are about eight described species in Renocera.

== Species ==
- R. amanda Cresson, 1920
- R. brevis (Cresson, 1920)
- R. johnsoni Cresson, 1920
- R. longipes (Loew, 1876)
- R. pallida (Fallén, 1820)
- R. praetextata Müller, 1924
- R. striata (Meigen, 1830)
- R. stroblii Hendel, 1900
