= Tetanoptera =

Scientific classification
- Kingdom: Animalia
- Phylum: Arthropoda
- Class: Insecta
- Order: Diptera
- Family: Sciomyzidae
- Subfamily: Sciomyzinae
- Tribe: Tetanocerini
- Genus: Tetanoptera; Verbeke, 1950
- Species: T. leucodactyla

Binomial name
- Tetanoptera leucodactyla Verbeke, 1950

Species of fly

Tetanoptera leucodactyla is a species of fly in the family Sciomyzidae, the only species in the genus Tetanoptera. It is found in the Oriental Region.
