= Ectinocera =

Scientific classification
- Kingdom: Animalia
- Phylum: Arthropoda
- Class: Insecta
- Order: Diptera
- Family: Sciomyzidae
- Subfamily: Sciomyzinae
- Tribe: Tetanocerini
- Genus: Ectinocera; Zetterstedt, 1838
- Species: E. borealis

Binomial name
- Ectinocera borealis Zetterstedt, 1838

Genus of flies

Ectinocera borealis is a species of fly in the family Sciomyzidae. It is found in the Palearctic. It is the only species in the genus Ectinocera.
