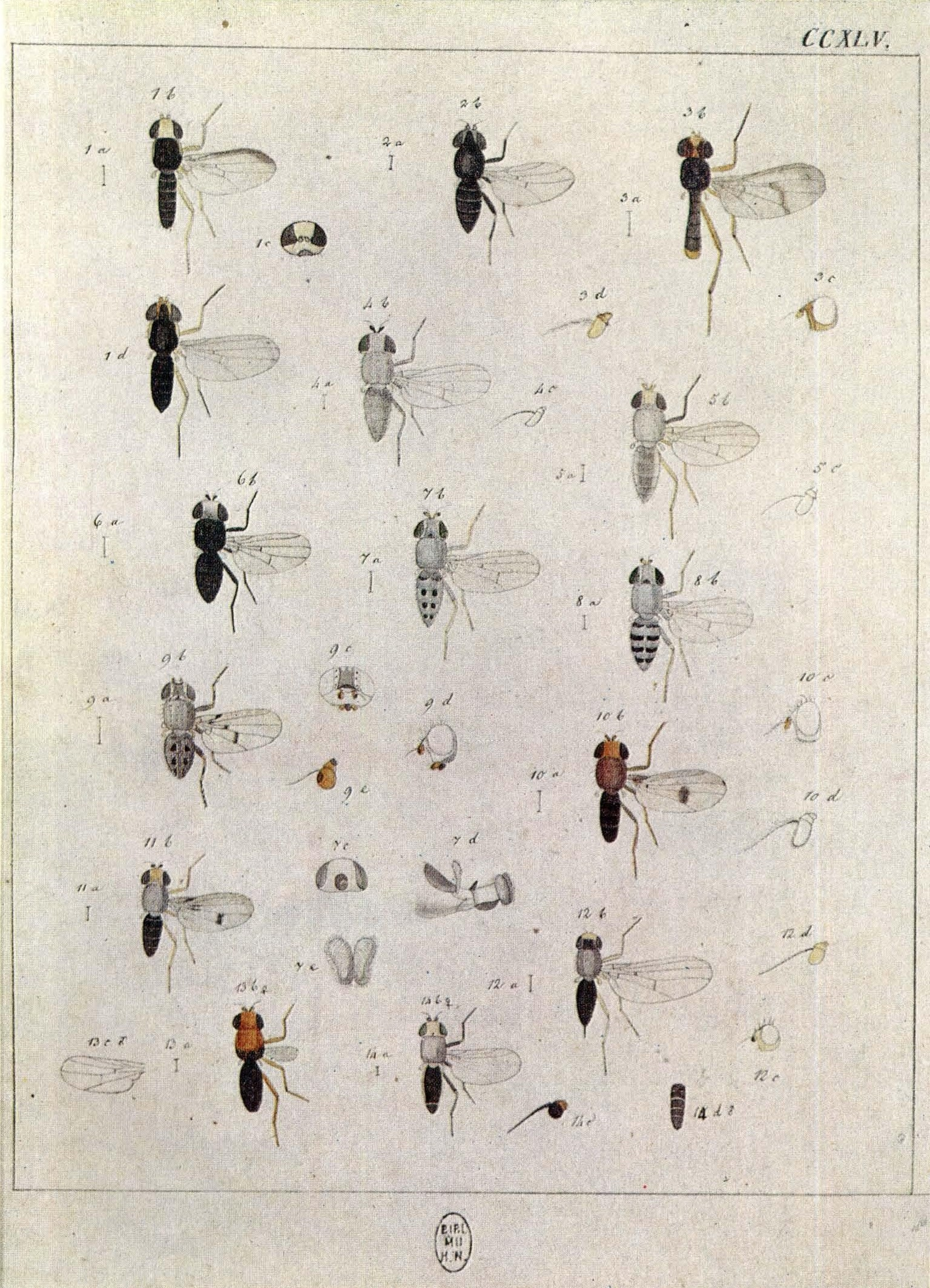
- T. pallidiventris in Meigen Europäischen Zweiflügeligen

Scientific classification
- Domain: Eukaryota
- Kingdom: Animalia
- Phylum: Arthropoda
- Class: Insecta
- Order: Diptera
- Family: Sciomyzidae
- Subfamily: Sciomyzinae
- Tribe: Sciomyzini
- Genus: Tetanura; Fallén, 1820

Type species
- Tetanura pallidiventris Fallén, 1820

= Tetanura =

Genus of flies

Tetanura is a genus of flies in the family Sciomyzidae, the marsh flies or snail-killing flies.

== Species ==
- T. fallenii Hendel, 1924
- T. pallidiventris Fallén, 1820
