= Pherbecta =

Scientific classification
- Domain: Eukaryota
- Kingdom: Animalia
- Phylum: Arthropoda
- Class: Insecta
- Order: Diptera
- Family: Sciomyzidae
- Subfamily: Sciomyzinae
- Tribe: Tetanocerini
- Genus: Pherbecta; Steyskal, 1956

Genus of flies

Pherbecta is a genus of marsh flies (insects in the family Sciomyzidae). There is at least one described species in Pherbecta, P. limenitis.
