= Sepedonella =

Scientific classification
- Kingdom: Animalia
- Phylum: Arthropoda
- Class: Insecta
- Order: Diptera
- Family: Sciomyzidae
- Subfamily: Sciomyzinae
- Tribe: Tetanocerini
- Genus: Sepedonella; Verbeke, 1950

Type species
- Sepedonella nana Verbeke, 1950

Genus of flies

Sepedonella is a genus of flies in the family Sciomyzidae, the marsh flies or snail-killing flies.

== Species ==
- S. bredoi Verbeke, 1950
- S. castanea Knutson, Deeming & Ebejer, 2018
- S. nana Verbeke, 1950
- S. straeleni Verbeke, 1956
- S. wittei Verbeke, 1950
