= Apteromicra =

Scientific classification
- Kingdom: Animalia
- Phylum: Arthropoda
- Class: Insecta
- Order: Diptera
- Family: Sciomyzidae
- Subfamily: Sciomyzinae
- Tribe: Sciomyzini
- Genus: Apteromicra; Papp, 2004
- Species: A. parva

Binomial name
- Apteromicra parva Papp, 2004

Species of fly

Apteromicra parva is a wingless species of fly in the family Sciomyzidae from Nepal. It is the only described species in the genus Apteromicra.
