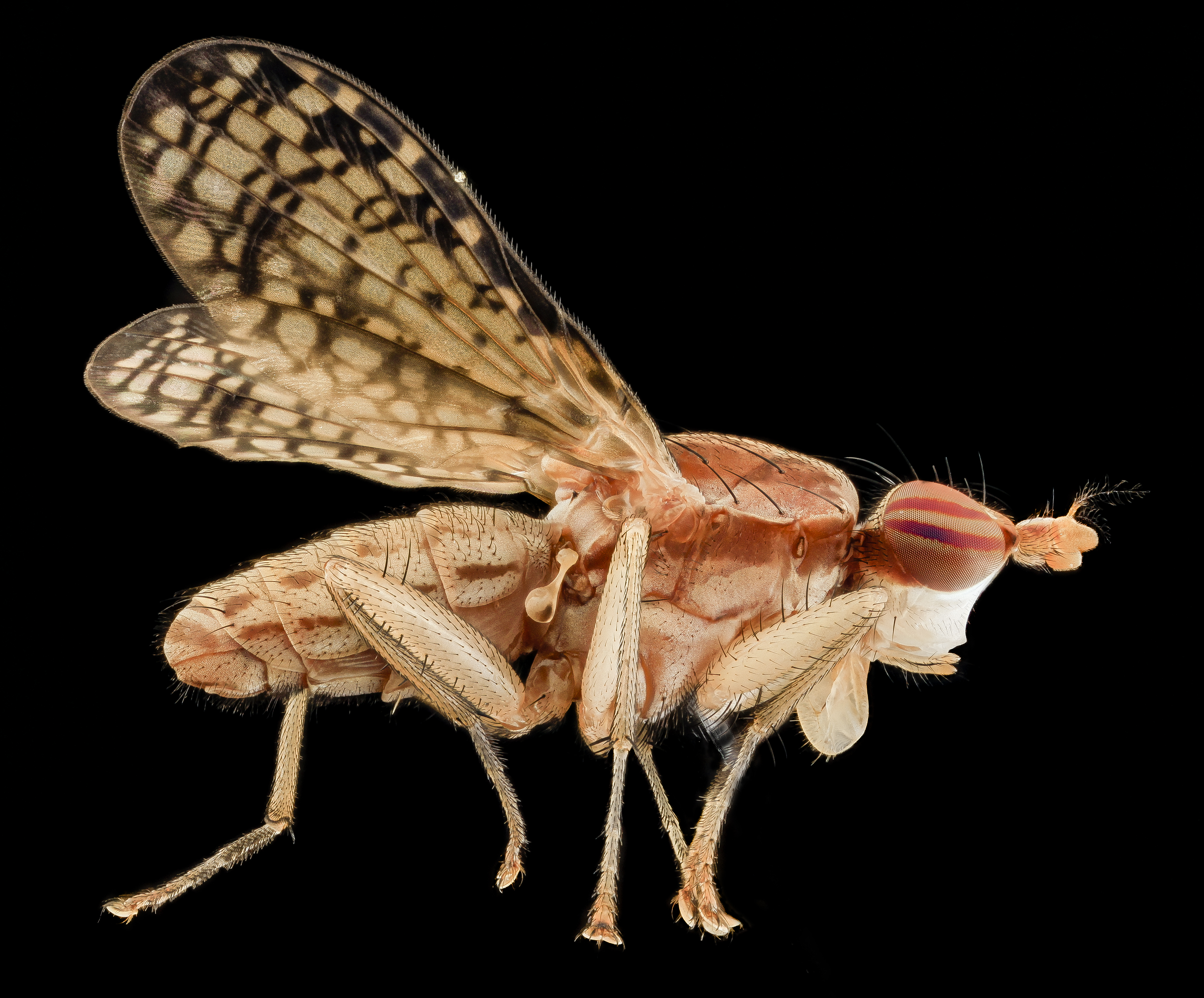
- Trypetoptera canadensis

Scientific classification
- Domain: Eukaryota
- Kingdom: Animalia
- Phylum: Arthropoda
- Class: Insecta
- Order: Diptera
- Family: Sciomyzidae
- Subfamily: Sciomyzinae
- Tribe: Tetanocerini
- Genus: Trypetoptera; Hendel, 1900

= Trypetoptera =

Genus of flies

Trypetoptera is a genus of marsh flies in the family Sciomyzidae. There are at least two described species in Trypetoptera.

== Species ==
- T. canadensis (Macquart, 1843)
- T. punctulata (Scopoli, 1763)
