= Poecilographa =

Scientific classification
- Domain: Eukaryota
- Kingdom: Animalia
- Phylum: Arthropoda
- Class: Insecta
- Order: Diptera
- Family: Sciomyzidae
- Subfamily: Sciomyzinae
- Tribe: Tetanocerini
- Genus: Poecilographa; Melander, 1913

Genus of flies

Poecilographa is a genus of marsh flies in the family Sciomyzidae. There is at least one described species in Poecilographa, P. decora.

== Species ==
- P. decora (Loew, 1864)
