= Oidematops =

Scientific classification
- Domain: Eukaryota
- Kingdom: Animalia
- Phylum: Arthropoda
- Class: Insecta
- Order: Diptera
- Family: Sciomyzidae
- Subfamily: Sciomyzinae
- Tribe: Sciomyzini
- Genus: Oidematops; Cresson, 1920
- Species: O. ferrugineus

Binomial name
- Oidematops ferrugineus Cresson, 1920

Species of fly

Oidematops ferrugineus is a species of fly in the family Sciomyzidae. It is the sole member of its genus.
