= Perilimnia =

Scientific classification
- Kingdom: Animalia
- Phylum: Arthropoda
- Clade: Pancrustacea
- Class: Insecta
- Order: Diptera
- Family: Sciomyzidae
- Subfamily: Sciomyzinae
- Tribe: Tetanocerini
- Genus: Perilimnia; Becker, 1919

Type species
- Perilimnia albifacies Becker, 1919

Genus of flies

Perilimnia is a genus of flies in the family Sciomyzidae, the marsh flies or snail-killing flies.

== Species ==
- P. albifacies Becker, 1919
- P. cineritia Zuska, 1969
