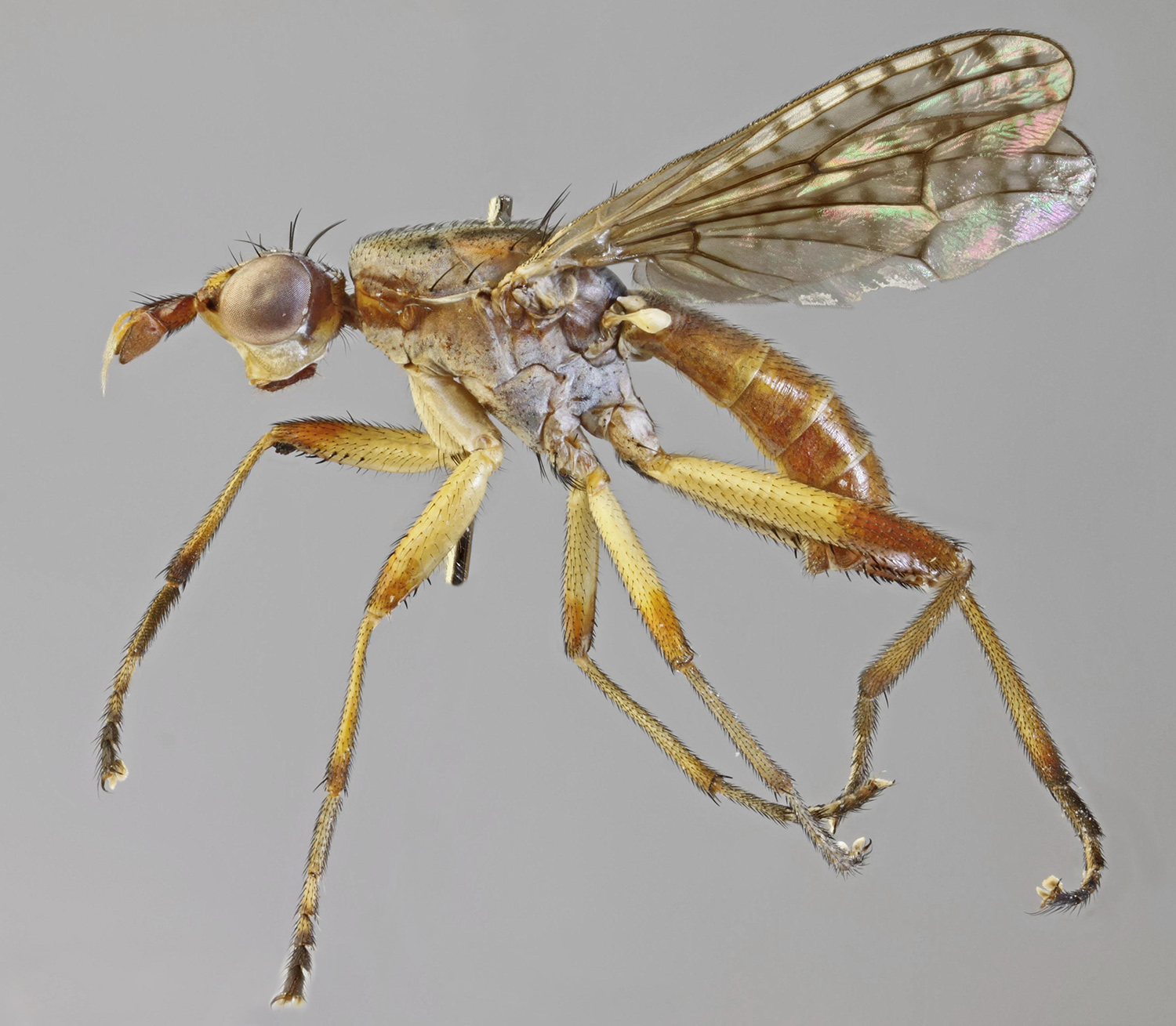
- Dichetophora obliterata

Scientific classification
- Kingdom: Animalia
- Phylum: Arthropoda
- Class: Insecta
- Order: Diptera
- Family: Sciomyzidae
- Subfamily: Sciomyzinae
- Tribe: Tetanocerini
- Genus: Dichetophora; Rondani, 1868

Type species
- Musca obliterata Fabricius, 1805

= Dichetophora =

Genus of flies

Dichetophora is a genus of flies in the family Sciomyzidae, the marsh flies or snail-killing flies.

== Species ==
- Subgenus Dichetophora Rondani, 1868

- Dichetophora australis (Walker, 1853)
- Dichetophora obliterata (Fabricius, 1805)

- Subgenus Neosepedon Malloch, 1928

- Dichetophora biroi (Kertész, 1901)
- Dichetophora boyesi Steyskal, in Boyes et al, 1972
- Dichetophora conjuncta Malloch, 1928
- Dichetophora hendeli (Kertész, 1901)
- Dichetophora punctipennis Malloch, 1928

- unplaced

- Dichetophora finlandica Verbeke, 1964
- Dichetophora intermedia Hendel, 1912
- Dichetophora japonica Sueyoshi, 2001
- Dichetophora kumadori Sueyoshi, 2001
- Dichetophora meleagris Hendel, 1912
