= Shannonia =

Scientific classification
- Domain: Eukaryota
- Kingdom: Animalia
- Phylum: Arthropoda
- Class: Insecta
- Order: Diptera
- Family: Sciomyzidae
- Tribe: Tetanocerini
- Genus: Shannonia; Malloch, 1933

Type species
- Tetanocera costalis Walker, 1837

Genus of flies

Shannonia is a genus of flies in the family Sciomyzidae, the marsh flies or snail-killing flies.

== Species ==
- Shannonia costalis (Walker, 1837)
- Shannonia meridionalis Zuska, 1969
