= Eutrichomelina =

Scientific classification
- Kingdom: Animalia
- Phylum: Arthropoda
- Class: Insecta
- Order: Diptera
- Family: Sciomyzidae
- Tribe: Tetanocerini
- Genus: Eutrichomelina; Steyskal, in Steyskal & Knutson, 1975

Type species
- Sciomyza fulvipennis Walker, 1837

Genus of flies

Eutrichomelina is a genus of flies in the family Sciomyzidae, the marsh flies or snail-killing flies.

== Species ==
- Eutrichomelina albibasis (Malloch, 1933)
- Eutrichomelina fulvipennis (Walker, 1837)
