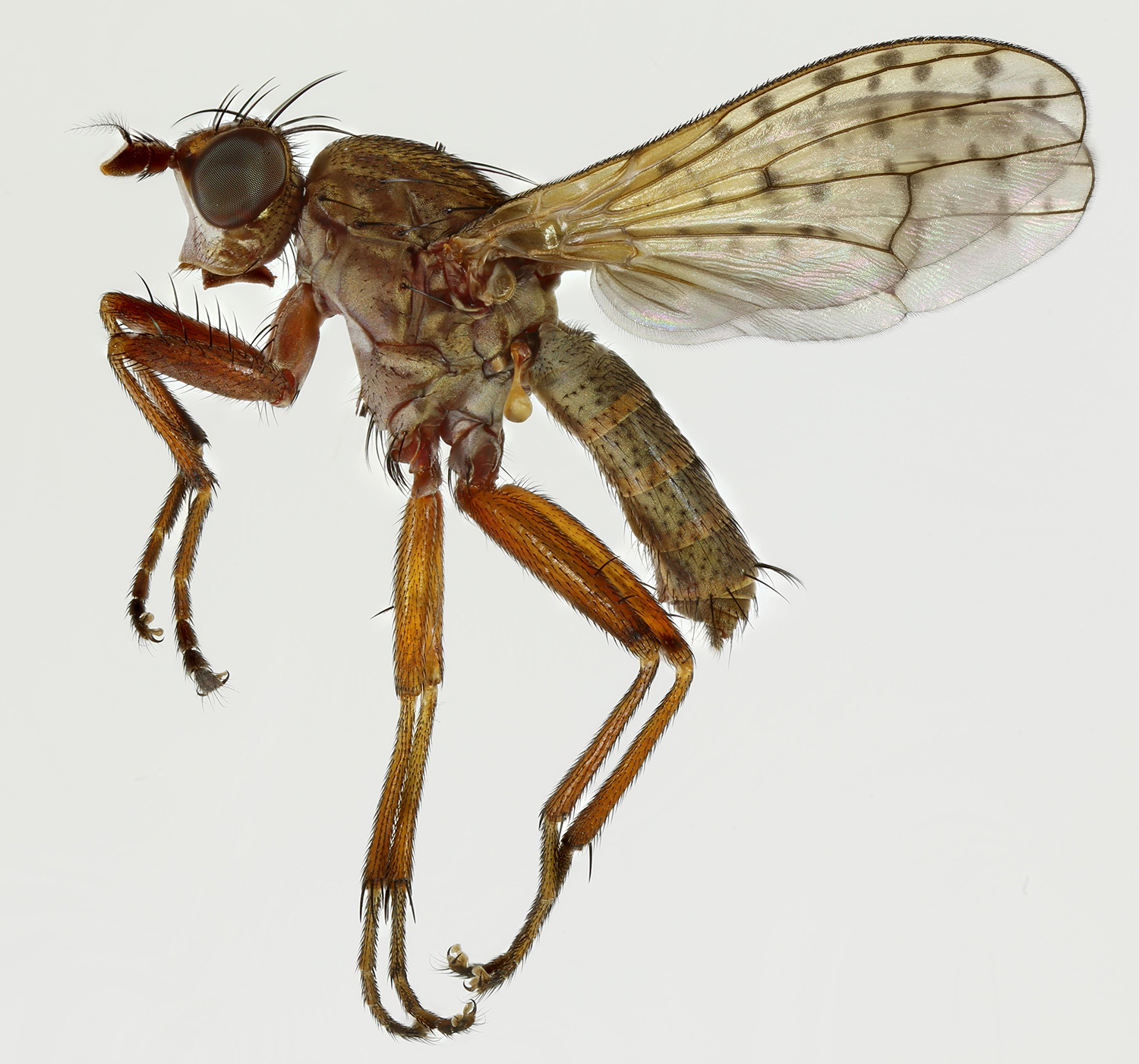
- Psacadina species, female.

Scientific classification
- Kingdom: Animalia
- Phylum: Arthropoda
- Clade: Pancrustacea
- Class: Insecta
- Order: Diptera
- Family: Sciomyzidae
- Subfamily: Sciomyzinae
- Tribe: Tetanocerini
- Genus: Psacadina; Enderlein, 1939

Type species
- Psacadina disjecta Enderlein, 1939

= Psacadina =

Genus of flies

Psacadina is a genus of flies in the family Sciomyzidae, the marsh flies or snail-killing flies.

== Species ==
- P. disjecta Enderlein, 1939
- P. kaszabi Elberg, 1978
- P. verbekei Rozkosny, 1975
- P. vittigera (Schiner, 1864)
- P. zernyi (Mayer, 1953)
