= Teutoniomyia =

Scientific classification
- Kingdom: Animalia
- Phylum: Arthropoda
- Clade: Pancrustacea
- Class: Insecta
- Order: Diptera
- Family: Sciomyzidae
- Tribe: Tetanocerini
- Genus: Teutoniomyia; Hennig, 1952

Type species
- Teutoniomyia plaumanni Hennig, 1952

Genus of flies

Teutoniomyia is a genus of flies in the family Sciomyzidae, the marsh flies or snail-killing flies.

== Species ==
Species include:

- Teutoniomyia plaumanni Hennig, 1952
- Teutoniomyia costaricensis Steyskal, 1960
