= Sepedoninus =

Scientific classification
- Kingdom: Animalia
- Phylum: Arthropoda
- Class: Insecta
- Order: Diptera
- Family: Sciomyzidae
- Tribe: Tetanocerini
- Genus: Sepedoninus; Verbeke, 1950

Type species
- Sepedoninus planifrons Verbeke, 1950

Genus of flies

Sepedoninus is a genus of flies in the family Sciomyzidae, the marsh flies or snail-killing flies.

== Species ==
Species include:

- S. curvisetis Verbeke, 1950
- S. planifrons Verbeke, 1950
