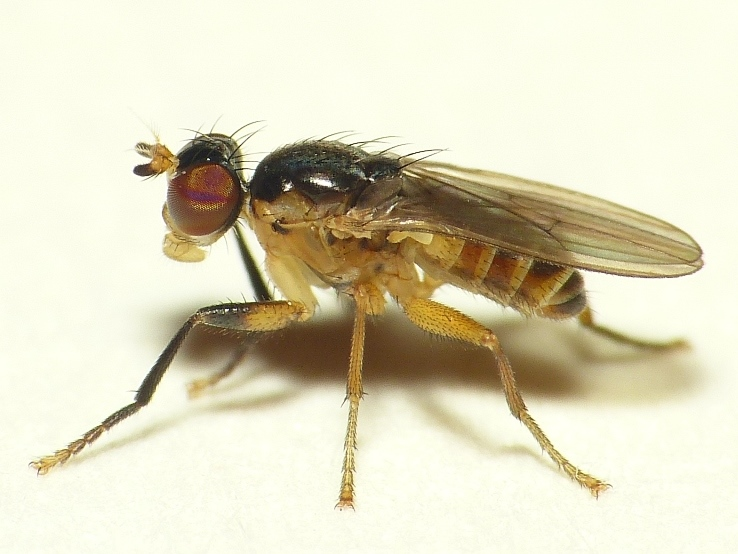
- Colobaea punctata

Scientific classification
- Domain: Eukaryota
- Kingdom: Animalia
- Phylum: Arthropoda
- Class: Insecta
- Order: Diptera
- Family: Sciomyzidae
- Subfamily: Sciomyzinae
- Tribe: Sciomyzini

= Sciomyzini =

Tribe of flies

Sciomyzini is a tribe of flies in the family Sciomyzidae.

== Genera ==
- Apteromicra Papp, 2004
- Atrichomelina Cresson, 1920
- Calliscia Steyskal, 1975
- Colobaea Zetterstedt, 1837
- Ditaeniella Sack, 1939
- Neuzina Marinoni & Knutson, 2004
- Oidematops Cresson, 1920
- Parectinocera Becker, 1919
- Pherbellia Robineau-Desvoidy, 1830
- Pseudomelina Malloch, 1933
- Psacadina Enderlein, 1939
- Pteromicra Lioy, 1864
- Sciomyza Fallén, 1820
- Tetanura Fallén, 1820
