= Hoplodictya =

Scientific classification
- Domain: Eukaryota
- Kingdom: Animalia
- Phylum: Arthropoda
- Class: Insecta
- Order: Diptera
- Family: Sciomyzidae
- Tribe: Tetanocerini
- Genus: Hoplodictya; Cresson, 1920

Type species
- Tetanocera setosa Coquillett, 1901

Genus of flies

Hoplodictya is a genus of marsh flies in the family Sciomyzidae. There are about five described species in Hoplodictya.

== Species ==
- H. acuticornis (Wulp, 1897)
- H. australis Fisher and Orth, 1972
- H. kincaidi (Johnson, 1913)
- H. setosa (Coquillett, 1901)
- H. spinicornis (Loew, 1866)
