= Sepedonea =

Scientific classification
- Domain: Eukaryota
- Kingdom: Animalia
- Phylum: Arthropoda
- Class: Insecta
- Order: Diptera
- Family: Sciomyzidae
- Tribe: Tetanocerini
- Genus: Sepedonea; Steyskal, 1973

Type species
- Sepedon lindneri Hendel, 1932

Genus of flies

Sepedonea is a genus of flies in the family Sciomyzidae, the marsh flies or snail-killing flies.

== Species ==
- S. barbosai Knutson & Bredt, 1976
- S. canabravana Knutson & Bredt, 1976
- S. giovana Marinoni & Mathis, 1991
- S. guatemalana (Steyskal, 1951)
- S. guianica (Steyskal, 1951)
- S. incipiens Freidberg, Knutson & Abercrombie, 1991
- S. isthmi (Steyskal, 1951)
- S. lagoa (Steyskal, 1951)
- S. lindneri (Hendel, 1932)
- S. neffi Freidberg, Knutson & Abercrombie, 1991
- S. telson (Steyskal, 1951)
- S. trichotypa Freidberg, Knutson & Abercrombie, 1991
- S. veredae Freidberg, Knutson & Abercrombie, 1991
