= Eulimnia =

Scientific classification
- Kingdom: Animalia
- Phylum: Arthropoda
- Class: Insecta
- Order: Diptera
- Family: Sciomyzidae
- Tribe: Tetanocerini
- Genus: Eulimnia; Tonnoir & Malloch, 1928

Type species
- Eulimnia milleri Tonnoir & Malloch, 1928

Genus of flies

Eulimnia is a New Zealand genus of flies in the family Sciomyzidae.

== Species ==
- Eulimnia milleri Tonnoir & Malloch, 1928
- Eulimnia philpotti Tonnoir & Malloch, 1928
