= Euthycerina =

Scientific classification
- Kingdom: Animalia
- Phylum: Arthropoda
- Class: Insecta
- Order: Diptera
- Family: Sciomyzidae
- Tribe: Tetanocerini
- Genus: Euthycerina; Malloch, 1933

Type species
- Euthycerina vittithorax Malloch, 1933

Genus of flies

Euthycerina is a genus of flies in the family Sciomyzidae, the marsh flies or snail-killing flies.

== Species ==
- Euthycerina pilosa Malloch, 1933
- Euthycerina vittithorax Malloch, 1933
