= Ethiolimnia =

Scientific classification
- Kingdom: Animalia
- Phylum: Arthropoda
- Class: Insecta
- Order: Diptera
- Family: Sciomyzidae
- Tribe: Tetanocerini
- Genus: Ethiolimnia; Verbeke, 1950

Type species
- Ethiolimnia platalea Verbeke, 1950

Genus of flies

Ethiolimnia is a genus of flies in the family Sciomyzidae, the marsh flies or snail-killing flies.

== Species ==
- E. brincki Verbeke, 1961
- E. geniculata Loew, 1862
- E. lindneri Verbeke, 1962
- E. platalea Verbeke, 1950
- E. vanrosi Verbeke, 1962
- E. vittipennis (Thomson, 1869)
- E. zumpti Verbeke, 1956
