= Dictyacium =

Scientific classification
- Domain: Eukaryota
- Kingdom: Animalia
- Phylum: Arthropoda
- Class: Insecta
- Order: Diptera
- Family: Sciomyzidae
- Tribe: Tetanocerini
- Genus: Dictyacium; Steyskal, 1956

Genus of flies

Dictyacium is a genus of flies in the family Sciomyzidae. There are at least two described species in Dictyacium.

== Species ==
- D. ambiguum (Loew, 1864)
- D. firmum Steyskal, 1956
