= Oligolimnia zernyi =

Scientific classification
- Domain: Eukaryota
- Kingdom: Animalia
- Phylum: Arthropoda
- Class: Insecta
- Order: Diptera
- Family: Sciomyzidae
- Genus: Oligolimnia; Mayer, 1953
- Species: O. zernyi

Binomial name
- Oligolimnia zernyi Mayer, 1953

Species of fly

Oligolimnia zernyi is a species of fly in the family Sciomyzidae. It is found in North Africa.
