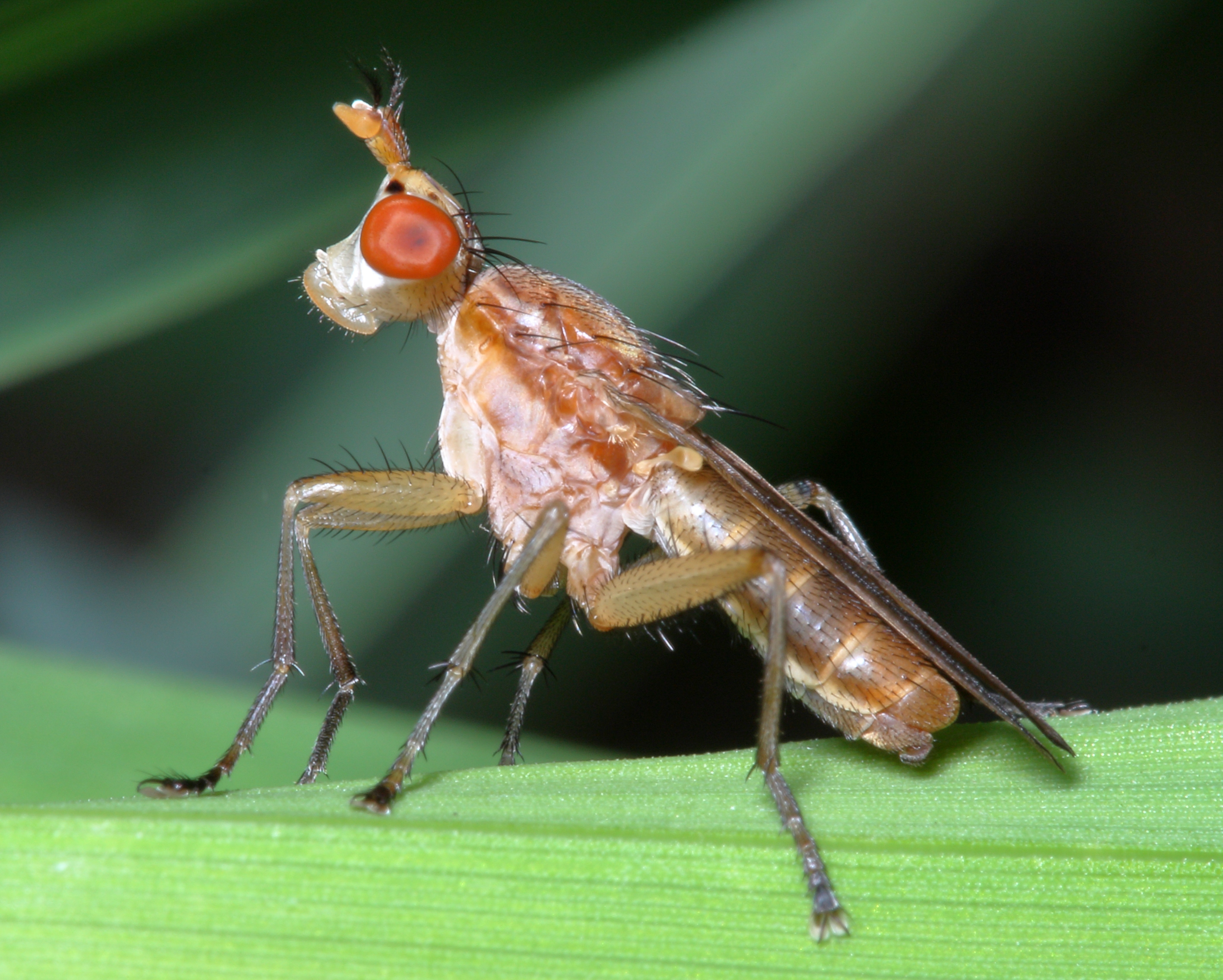
- Tetanocera sp. Size = 10mm

Scientific classification
- Kingdom: Animalia
- Phylum: Arthropoda
- Clade: Pancrustacea
- Class: Insecta
- Order: Diptera
- Section: Schizophora
- Subsection: Acalyptratae
- Superfamily: Sciomyzoidea
- Family: Sciomyzidae; Fallén, 1820

Subfamilies
- Sciomyzinae; Huttonininae (disputed); Phaeomyiinae (disputed); Salticellinae (disputed)

Synonyms
- Huttoninidae (disputed); Phaeomyiidae (disputed); Tetanoceridae

= Sciomyzidae =

Family of flies

Pherbellia annulipes hunting on decaying wood (video, 1m 6s)

Limnia sp. on a blade of grass (video, 34s)

The family Sciomyzidae belongs to the typical flies (Brachycera) of the order Diptera. They are commonly called marsh flies, and in some cases snail-killing flies due to the food of their larvae.

Here, the Huttoninidae, Phaeomyiidae and Tetanoceridae are provisionally included in the Sciomyzidae. Particularly the latter seem to be an unequivocal part of this group and are ranked as tribe of subfamily Sciomyzinae by most modern authors, while the former two are very small lineages that may or may not stand outside the family and are provisionally ranked as subfamilies here. Whether the Salticellinae and the group around Sepedon warrant recognition as additional subfamilies or are better included in the Sciomyzinae proper is likewise not yet entirely clear. Altogether, the main point of contention is the relationship between the "Huttoninidae", "Phaeomyiidae", Sciomyzidae sensu stricto, and the Helosciomyzidae which were also once included in the Sciomyzidae.

Sciomyzidae are found in all the biogeographic realms but are poorly represented in the Australasian and Oceanian realms.

== Description ==
Sciomyzidae are small or medium-sized (2–14 mm), usually slender flies with predominantly dull grey, brown, reddish or yellow body, rarely black-lustrous. Wings hyaline, often with dark spots or dark reticulate pattern. The head is semispherical or round. The antennae are usually elongate and the arista is pubescent or has shorter or longer hairs. Ocelli and ocellar bristles are present (absent in Sepedon). The postvertical bristles are divergent or parallel. There are one or two pairs of frontal bristles which curve backward (the lower pair sometimes curving inward) Interfrontal bristles are absent but interfrontal setulae are sometimes present. Vibrissae are absent. The wing is clear or with conspicuous markings. The costa is continuous and the subcosta is complete. Crossvein BM-Cu is present and the anal cell (cell cup) is closed. Tibiae almost always have a dorsal preapical bristle.

== Biology ==
Marsh flies are common along the edges of ponds and rivers, and in marshy areas. The adults drink dew and nectar. The larvae prey on or become parasites of gastropods (slugs and snails). The occasional sciomyzid attacks snail eggs or fingernail clams. Very little is known about the complete life cycle of these flies but most of the known larvae are semi-aquatic and some are aquatic. Other species have terrestrial larvae. Larvae mainly prey on non-operculate snails. Some species which prey on bivalves have larvae adapted to breathing under water. In some terrestrial species the penultimate larval instar emerges from the snail or slug it developed in. The last instar is then predatory on several snails.

The adults rest on vegetation head down. According to the larval habitat, they are found near water, in marshy vegetation, in woodland or occasionally dry open habitats.

== Identification ==
- Stackelberg, A.A. Family Sciomyzidae in Bei-Bienko, G. Ya, 1988 Keys to the insects of the European Part of the USSR Volume 5 (Diptera) Part 2 English edition. Keys to Palaearctic species but now needs revision.
- Séguy, E. (1934) Diptères: Brachycères. II. Muscidae acalypterae, Scatophagidae. Paris: Éditions Faune de France 28. virtuelle numérique

== Selected genera ==
Subfamily Sciomyzinae (possibly polyphyletic)

Tribe Sciomyzini

- Apteromicra Papp, 2004
- Atrichomelina Cresson, 1920
- Calliscia Steyskal, 1975
- Colobaea Zetterstedt, 1837
- Ditaeniella Sack, 1939
- Neuzina Marinoni & Knutson, 2004
- Oidematops Cresson, 1920
- Parectinocera Becker, 1919
- Pherbellia Robineau-Desvoidy, 1830
- Pseudomelina Malloch, 1933
- Psacadina Enderlein, 1939
- Pteromicra Lioy, 1864
- Sciomyza Fallén, 1820
- Tetanura Fallén, 1820

Tribe Tetanocerini

- Anticheta Haliday, 1838
- Chasmacryptum Becker, 1907
- Coremacera Rondani, 1856
- Dichetophora Rondani, 1868
- Dictya Meigen, 1803
- Dictyacium Steyskal, 1956
- Dictyodes Malloch, 1933
- Ectinocera Zetterstedt, 1838
- Elgiva Meigen, 1838
- Ethiolimnia Verbeke, 1950
- Eulimnia Tonnoir & Malloch, 1928
- Euthycera Latreille, 1829
- Euthycerina Malloch, 1933
- Eutrichomelina Steyskal, in Steyskal & Knutson, 1975
- Guatemalia Steyskal, 1960
- Hedria Steyskal, 1954
- Hoplodictya Cresson, 1920
- Hydromya Robineau-Desvoidy, 1830
- Ilione Haliday in Curtis, 1837
- Limnia Robineau-Desvoidy, 1830
- "Neodictya" Elberg, 1965
- Neolimnia Tonnoir & Malloch, 1928
- Oligolimnia Mayer, 1953
- Perilimnia Becker, 1919
- Pherbecta Steyskal, 1956
- Pherbina Robineau-Desvoidy, 1830
- Poecilographa Melander, 1913
- Protodictya Malloch, 1933
- Psacadina Enderlein, 1939
- Renocera Hendel, 1900
- Sepedomerus Steyskal, 1973
- Sepedon Latreille, 1804
- Sepedonea Steyskal, 1973
- Sepedonella Verbeke, 1950
- Sepedoninus Verbeke, 1950
- Shannonia Malloch, 1933
- Steyskalina Knutson, 1999
- Tetanocera Duméril, 1800
- Tetanoceroides Malloch, 1933
- Tetanoptera Verbeke, 1950
- Teutoniomyia Hennig, 1952
- Thecomyia Perty, 1833
- Trypetolimnia Mayer, 1953
- Trypetoptera Hendel, 1900
- Verbekaria Knutson, 1968

Subfamily Huttonininae (tentatively placed here)

- Huttonina Tonnoir & Malloch, 1928
- Prosochaeta Malloch, 1935

Subfamily Phaeomyiinae (tentatively placed here)

- Akebono Sueyoshi, 2009
- Pelidnoptera Rondani, 1856
- † Prophaeomyia Hennig, 1965

Subfamily Salticellinae (sometimes included in Sciomyzinae)

- † Prosalticella Hennig, 1965
- Salticella Robineau-Desvoidy, 1830
