= List of Empis species =

This is a list of 833 species in Empis, a genus of dance flies in the family Empididae.

== Empis species ==
- Empis abbreviata Loew, 1869^{c g}
- Empis abbrevinervis Meijere, 1911^{c g}
- Empis abcirus Walker, 1849^{i c g}
- Empis abdominalis Daugeron, 1999^{c g}
- Empis aberdarensis Smith, 1971^{c g}
- Empis abrupta Thomson, 1869^{c g}
- Empis achelota Collin, 1941^{c g}
- Empis acinerea Chvála, 1985^{c g}
- Empis acris Daugeron & Grootaert, 2005^{c g}
- Empis adamsi Smith, 1967^{c g}
- Empis adelpha Frey, 1953^{c g}
- Empis adriani Chvála, 1996^{c g}
- Empis adusta Loew, 1869^{c g}
- Empis adzharica Shamshev, 1998^{c g}
- Empis aemula Loew, 1873^{c g}
- Empis aequalis Loew, 1867^{c g}
- Empis aeripes Melander, 1902^{i c g}
- Empis aerobatica Melander, 1902^{i c g}
- Empis aestiva Loew, 1867^{c g}
- Empis affinis Egger, 1860^{c g}
- Empis afipsiensis Shamsev & Kustov, 2008^{c g}
- Empis agasthus Walker, 1849^{i c g}
- Empis alaarchaensis Chvála, 1999^{c g}
- Empis alampra Loew, 1873^{c g}
- Empis alanica Shamshev, 1998^{c g}
- Empis alata Hardy, 1934^{c g}
- Empis alatauensis Chvála, 1999^{c g}
- Empis albens (Wiedemann, 1818)^{c g}
- Empis albicans Meigen, 1822^{c g}
- Empis albicincta Loew, 1858^{c g}
- Empis albidiseta Becker, 1907^{c g}
- Empis albifrons Bezzi, 1909^{c g}
- Empis albinervis Meigen, 1822^{c g}
- Empis albipennis Waltl, 1837^{c g}
- Empis albohalteralis Brunetti, 1920^{c g}
- Empis albopilosa Meijere, 1935^{g}
- Empis albopliosa Meijere, 1935^{c g}
- Empis aldrichii Melander, 1902^{i c g}
- Empis algecirasensis Strobl, 1909^{c g}
- Empis algira Macquart, 1838^{c g}
- Empis alpicola Strobl, 1893^{c g}
- Empis alpina Loew, 1867^{c g}
- Empis ambigua Bezzi, 1905^{c g}
- Empis amurensis Shamshev, 1998^{c g}
- Empis amytis Walker, 1849^{i c g}
- Empis anfractuosa Mik, 1884^{c g}
- Empis angorae Collin, 1937^{c g}
- Empis angustipennis Bezzi, 1909^{c g}
- Empis annulipes Wheeler & Melander, 1901^{c g}
- Empis antennata Collin, 1941^{c g}
- Empis anthophila Melander, 1946^{i c g}
- Empis anthracina Bigot, 1888^{c g}
- Empis apfellbecki Strobl, 1898^{c g}
- Empis apicalis Loew, 1865^{c g}
- Empis apophysis Frey, 1953^{c g}
- Empis appalachicola Sinclair, 2013^{g}
- Empis appendiculata Collin, 1938^{c g}
- Empis aprica (Stephens, 1829)^{c g}
- Empis aquila White, 1916^{c g}
- Empis ardesiaca Wiedemann, 1822^{c g}
- Empis argentea Daugeron, 2000^{c g}
- Empis argyriventris Smith, 1969^{c g}
- Empis armentalis Collin, 1941^{c g}
- Empis armipes Loew, 1861^{i c g}
- Empis arthritica Melander, 1902^{i c g}
- Empis asema Melander, 1902^{i c g}
- Empis aspina Daugeron & Grootaert, 2005^{c g}
- Empis assalemensis Daugeron, 2000^{c g}
- Empis assimilis Strobl, 1893^{c g}
- Empis ater Macquart, 1827^{c g}
- Empis atra (Fabricius, 1780)^{g}
- Empis atratata Daugeron & Grootaert, 2003^{c g}
- Empis atrifemur Wheeler & Melander, 1901^{c g}
- Empis aurata Villers, 1789^{c g}
- Empis autumnalis Saigusa, 1964^{c g}
- Empis azerbaijanica Shamshev, 2006^{c g}
- Empis azishtauensis Shamshev & Kustov^{g}
- Empis azteca Wheeler & Melander, 1901^{c g}
- Empis baldensis Strobl, 1899^{c g}
- Empis barbatoides Melander, 1965^{i c g}
- Empis barbitos Smith, 1971^{c g}
- Empis barotse Smith, 1969^{c g}
- Empis basalis Loew, 1873^{c g}
- Empis basilaris Becker, 1908^{c g}
- Empis basiliaris Becker, 1908^{g}
- Empis bazini Collin, 1926^{c g}
- Empis bechuana Smith, 1969^{c g}
- Empis beckeriana Engel, 1946^{c g}
- Empis bellatoria White, 1916^{c g}
- Empis belousovi Shamshev, 1998^{c g}
- Empis bicolor Bellardi, 1861^{c g}
- Empis bicuspidata Collin, 1927^{c g}
- Empis bigoti Melander, 1902^{i c g}
- Empis bistortae Meigen, 1822^{c g}
- Empis bivittata Wiedemann, 1824^{c g}
- Empis bohemica Chvala & Syrovatka, 1987^{c g}
- Empis borealis Linnaeus, 1758^{c g}
- Empis borisovae Shamshev, 2002^{c g}
- Empis brachysoma Coquillett, 1900^{i c g}
- Empis brandti Shamshev, GrootaertShamshev & Grootaert, 2005^{c g}
- Empis brazzavillensis Daugeron, 2001^{c g}
- Empis brevipennata Macquart, 1827^{c g}
- Empis brevirostris Macquart, 1850^{c g}
- Empis brevis (Loew, 1862)^{i c g}
- Empis brincki Smith, 1967^{c g}
- Empis brouni Hutton, 1901^{c g}
- Empis browni Curran, 1931^{i c g}
- Empis brunnea Coquillett, 1903^{i c g}
- Empis brunnipennis Meigen, 1822^{c g}
- Empis bullata Bezzi, 1905^{c g}
- Empis bullifera Kessel and Kessel, 1951^{i c g}
- Empis burmaensis Frey, 1953^{c g}
- Empis caceresensis Daugeron, 2000^{c g}
- Empis cacuminifer Melander, 1902^{i c g}
- Empis caeligena Melander, 1902^{i c g}
- Empis calcarata Bezzi, 1899^{c g}
- Empis calcitrans Scopoli, 1763^{c g}
- Empis calvinia Smith, 1969^{c g}
- Empis cameronensis Daugeron & Grootaert, 2005^{c g}
- Empis canaster Melander, 1902^{i g}
- Empis candida Rossi, 1790^{c g}
- Empis candidata Loew, 1873^{c g}
- Empis cantabrica Strobl, 1899^{c g}
- Empis captus Coquillett, 1895^{i c g}
- Empis carbonaria Brunetti, 1913^{c g}
- Empis caucasica Bezzi, 1909^{c g}
- Empis caudatula Loew, 1867^{c g}
- Empis centralis Brunetti, 1913^{c g}
- Empis cetywayoi Smith, 1969^{c g}
- Empis ceylonica Bezzi, 1904^{c g}
- Empis cherskii Shamshev, 2006^{c g}
- Empis chioptera Meigen, 1804^{c g}
- Empis chiragra Bezzi, 1909^{c g}
- Empis chopardi Daugeron, 1997^{c g}
- Empis chrysocera Collin, 1930^{c g}
- Empis ciliata Fabricius, 1787^{c g}
- Empis ciliatopennata Strobl, 1893^{c g}
- Empis cilicauda Collin, 1960^{c g}
- Empis cincinnatula Loew, 1867^{c g}
- Empis cinctiventris Frey, 1953^{c g}
- Empis cineraria Bezzi, 1914^{c g}
- Empis cinerarius Daugeron & Grootaert, 2003^{c g}
- Empis cinerea Müller, 1776^{c g}
- Empis cingulata Gimmerthal, 1834^{c g}
- Empis claricolor Frey, 1953^{c g}
- Empis clauda Schrank, 1803^{c g}
- Empis clausa Coquillett, 1895^{i c g b}
- Empis clausipyga Saigusa, 1992^{c g}
- Empis cochleata Frey, 1953^{c g}
- Empis cognata Stephens, 1829^{g}
- Empis colonica Walker, 1849^{i c g}
- Empis comantis (Coquillett, 1955)^{i c g}
- Empis cometes Steyskal, 1965^{i c g}
- Empis compsogyne Frey, 1953^{c g}
- Empis compta Coquillett, 1895^{i c g}
- Empis concolor Verrall, 1872^{c g}
- Empis confidens Harris, 1776^{c g}
- Empis confirmata (Walker, 1852)^{c g}
- Empis confluens Becker, 1907^{c g}
- Empis confusa Loew, 1865^{c g}
- Empis consobrina Syrovatka, 1983^{c g}
- Empis constricta Saigusa, 1992^{c g}
- Empis contigua (Loew, 1864)^{c g}
- Empis copiosa Collin, 1933^{c g}
- Empis coptophleboides Frey, 1953^{c g}
- Empis coracina Bezzi, 1909^{c g}
- Empis corcyrica Bezzi, 1909^{c g}
- Empis corvina Loew, 1869^{c g}
- Empis cothurnata Brullé, 1833^{c g}
- Empis coxalis Thomson, 1869^{c g}
- Empis crassa Nowicki, 1868^{c g}
- Empis crassifila Loew, 1858^{c g}
- Empis crassipes Schrank, 1781^{c g}
- Empis ctenocnema Melander, 1945^{i c g}
- Empis cucullata Collin, 1933^{c g}
- Empis cuneipennis Bezzi, 1899^{c g}
- Empis curta Loew, 1869^{c g}
- Empis curticornis Collin, 1960^{c g}
- Empis curvipes Loew, 1868^{c g}
- Empis curvitibia Chvála, 2003^{c g}
- Empis cushcaensis Shamsev, 2001^{c g}
- Empis cuthbertsoni Smith, 1971^{c g}
- Empis cyaneiventris Frey, 1953^{c g}
- Empis cylindeacea Frey, 1953^{c g}
- Empis cyrenaica (Bezzi, 1925)^{c g}
- Empis dactylica Melander, 1946^{i c g}
- Empis dahuriensis Shamshev, 2002^{c g}
- Empis dalmatica Oldenberg, 1925^{c g}
- Empis damara Smith, 1969^{c g}
- Empis damascena Collin, 1937^{c g}
- Empis dasycera (Collin, 1960)^{c g}
- Empis dasychira Mik, 1878^{c g}
- Empis dasynota Loew, 1869^{c g}
- Empis dasypoda Egger, 1860^{c g}
- Empis dasyprocta Loew, 1867^{c g}
- Empis dasytarsus Smith, 1969^{c g}
- Empis daugeroni Yang, Zhang & Zhang, 2007^{c g}
- Empis decora Meigen, 1822^{c g}
- Empis decorella Chvála, 1981^{c g}
- Empis dedecor Loew, 1869^{c g}
- Empis degener Frey, 1953^{c g}
- Empis delumbis Melander, 1965^{i c g}
- Empis demissa Collin, 1949^{c g}
- Empis depilis Loew, 1873^{c g}
- Empis derbecki Shamshev, 2006^{c g}
- Empis desiderata Melander, 1965^{i c g}
- Empis deterra Walley, 1927^{i g}
- Empis diagramma Meigen, 1835^{c g}
- Empis difficilis Frey, 1953^{c g}
- Empis digramma Meigen, 1835^{g}
- Empis dimidiata Meigen, 1835^{c g}
- Empis dingaani Smith, 1969^{c g}
- Empis discoidalis Collin, 1941^{c g}
- Empis discolor Loew, 1856^{c g}
- Empis discrepans Collin, 1960^{c g}
- Empis disjuncta Collin, 1933^{c g}
- Empis dispar Scholtz, 1851^{c g}
- Empis dispina Chvála, 1996^{c g}
- Empis distans Loew, 1869^{i c g}
- Empis distincta Collin, 1933^{c g}
- Empis divisa Loew, 1869^{c g}
- Empis dixi Steyskal, 1969^{i c g}
- Empis dolabraria Melander, 1902^{i c g}
- Empis dolorosa Wheeler & Melander, 1901^{c g}
- Empis donga Daugeron, Grootaert & Yang, 2003^{c g}
- Empis doronicola Çiftçi, 2014
- Empis dubia (Scopoli, 1763)^{c g}
- Empis dumetorum Philippi, 1865^{c g}
- Empis duplex Daugeron & Grootaert, 2005^{c g}
- Empis dushanbensis Shamsev, 2001^{c g}
- Empis dusmetii Strobl, 1909^{c g}
- Empis earina Collin, 1960^{c g}
- Empis echigoensis Saigusa, 1964^{c g}
- Empis edithae Daugeron, 1997^{c g}
- Empis edwardsi Smith, 1971^{c g}
- Empis elegans Brunetti, 1913^{c g}
- Empis engeli Chvála, 1999^{c g}
- Empis enodis Melander, 1902^{i c g}
- Empis erosa Loew, 1869^{c g}
- Empis eudamides Walker, 1849^{i c g}
- Empis eumera Loew, 1868^{c g}
- Empis eupeza Loew, 1874^{c g}
- Empis eversmanni Loew, 1873^{c g}
- Empis exilis Coquillett, 1903^{i c g}
- Empis exotica Wiedemann, 1824^{c g}
- Empis fagina Daugeron, 2009^{g}
- Empis falcata Melander, 1902^{i c g}
- Empis fallax Egger, 1860^{c g}
- Empis fasciculata Strobl, 1901^{c g}
- Empis femorata Fabricius, 1798^{c g}
- Empis ferruginea (Meigen, 1822)^{g}
- Empis filata Loew, 1873^{c g}
- Empis fimbria Walker, 1852^{c g}
- Empis fiorii Bezzi, 1910^{c g}
- Empis fiumana Egger, 1860^{c g}
- Empis flabilis White, 1916^{c g}
- Empis flava Müller, 1764^{c g}
- Empis flavescens (Rossi, 1794)^{c g}
- Empis flavicans Olivier, 1791^{c g}
- Empis flavinervis Philippi, 1865^{c g}
- Empis flavipes (Thunberg, 1784)^{c g}
- Empis flavitarsis Roser, 1840^{c g}
- Empis flavobasalis Matsumura, 1915^{c g}
- Empis florisomna Loew, 1856^{c g}
- Empis fovea Saigusa, 1964^{c g}
- Empis frauscheri Strobl, 1901^{c g}
- Empis freidbergi Chvála, 1999^{c g}
- Empis freyi Yang, Zhang & Zhang, 2007^{c g}
- Empis frontalis Coquillett, 1903^{i c g}
- Empis fulvicollis Collin, 1933^{c g}
- Empis fulvipes Wiedemann, 1822^{c g}
- Empis fumida Coquillett, 1900^{i c g}
- Empis funebris Meigen, 1804^{c g}
- Empis funesta Waltl, 1837^{c g}
- Empis fusca Daugeron & Lefebvre, 2015^{g}
- Empis fuscipes Gmelin, 1790^{g}
- Empis gaigeri Gercke, 1886^{c g}
- Empis geneatis (Melander, 1902)^{i c g b}
- Empis gentilis Frey, 1953^{c g}
- Empis genualis Strobl, 1893^{c g}
- Empis ghigiana Bezzi, 1924^{c g}
- Empis gibbipes Strobl, 1906^{c g}
- Empis gibbosa Gmelin, 1790^{c g}
- Empis glabratella Collin, 1941^{c g}
- Empis gladiator Melander, 1902^{i c g}
- Empis glandis Smith, 1969^{c g}
- Empis golubi Shamsev, 2001^{c g}
- Empis gooti Chvála, 1994^{c g}
- Empis gorodkovi Shamsev, 2001^{c g}
- Empis gracilipes Philippi, 1865^{c g}
- Empis gracilis Curtis, 1835^{c g}
- Empis gracilitarsis Strobl, 1899^{c g}
- Empis gravipes Loew, 1856^{c g}
- Empis gravis Wiedemann, 1822^{c g}
- Empis grisea Fallén, 1816^{c g}
- Empis griseonigra Brunetti, 1913^{c g}
- Empis guilanensis Kazerani & Shamshev, 2014^{g}
- Empis gulosa Coquillett, 1895^{i c g}
- Empis gymnopoda Bezzi, 1908^{c g}
- Empis haemi Loew, 1862^{c g}
- Empis haemorrhoica Loew, 1869^{c g}
- Empis hainanensis Yang, Yang & Hu, 2002^{c g}
- Empis hayachinensis Saigusa, 1964^{c g}
- Empis heliciphora Collin, 1937^{c g}
- Empis helophila Loew, 1867^{c g}
- Empis hirsuta Becker, 1915^{c g}
- Empis hirsutipennis Smith, 1976^{c g}
- Empis hirta Loew, 1865^{c g}
- Empis hirticrus Melander, 1927^{i c g}
- Empis hirtipes Wiedemann, 1824^{c g}
- Empis hissarica Chvála, 1999^{c g}
- Empis hoffmannseggii Loew, 1869^{c g}
- Empis holocleroides Frey, 1953^{c g}
- Empis holosericea Walker, 1849^{c g}
- Empis honsyuensis Frey, 1953^{c g}
- Empis hubeiensis Yang & Yang, 1997^{c g}
- Empis humeralis Collin, 1933^{c g}
- Empis humilis Coquillett, 1895^{i g}
- Empis hyalea Melander, 1946^{c g}
- Empis hyalinata Meigen, 1830^{c g}
- Empis hyalipennis Fallén, 1816^{c g}
- Empis hyalogyne Bezzi, 1912^{c g}
- Empis hypandrialis Daugeron, 2000^{c g}
- Empis hystrichopyga Bezzi, 1912^{c g}
- Empis hystrix Loew, 1867^{c g}
- Empis ifranensis Daugeron, 1997^{c g}
- Empis impar Melander, 1946^{c g}
- Empis impennis Strobl, 1902^{c g}
- Empis imputata Collin, 1933^{c g}
- Empis incensa Frey, 1953^{c g}
- Empis inclinata Bezzi, 1912^{c g}
- Empis incompleta Macquart, 1846^{c g}
- Empis inconspicua Brunetti, 1913^{c g}
- Empis incurva Daugeron & Grootaert, 2005^{c g}
- Empis indigirca Chvála, 1999^{c g}
- Empis indissimilis Collin, 1941^{c g}
- Empis indumeni Smith, 1969^{c g}
- Empis induta Bezzi, 1909^{c g}
- Empis inferiseta Daugeron & Grootaert, 2005^{c g}
- Empis infumata Coquillett, 1900^{i c g}
- Empis ingrata Frey, 1953^{c g}
- Empis inopinata Collin, 1960^{c g}
- Empis inornata Loew, 1858^{c g}
- Empis insularis Chvála, 2003^{c g}
- Empis insulata Collin, 1937^{c g}
- Empis intercepta Melander, 1928^{c g}
- Empis itoiana Frey, 1953^{c g}
- Empis jacksoni Smith, 1971^{c g}
- Empis jacobsoni Meijere, 1907^{c g}
- Empis jacutiensis Shamsev, 2001^{c g}
- Empis janssoni Saigusa, 2012^{g}
- Empis japonica Frey, 1955^{c g}
- Empis johnsoni Melander, 1902^{i c g}
- Empis juxtaripa Daugeron, 2001^{c g}
- Empis kafiri Smith, 1969^{c g}
- Empis kasparyani Shamshev, 1998^{c g}
- Empis kawatiensis Frey, 1953^{c g}
- Empis kazakhstanica Chvála, 1999^{c g}
- Empis keberlei Shamsev, 2001^{c g}
- Empis kerteszi Bezzi, 1900^{c g}
- Empis kirgizica Chvála, 1999^{c g}
- Empis kondaraensis Shamshev, 2006^{c g}
- Empis korana Smith, 1969^{c g}
- Empis kosametensis Daugeron & Grootaert, 2003^{c g}
- Empis kovalevi Shamshev, 1998^{c g}
- Empis kozlovi Shamshev, 1998^{c g}
- Empis krasnodarensis Shamshev & Kustov, 2013^{g}
- Empis kuaensis Daugeron & Grootaert, 2005^{c g}
- Empis kubaniensis Shamsev & Kustov, 2008^{c g}
- Empis kugleri Chvála, 1999^{c g}
- Empis kuntzei Becker, 1910^{c g}
- Empis kvakensis Shamshev, 2003^{c g}
- Empis kyushuensis Frey, 1953^{c g}
- Empis labiata Loew, 1861^{i c g}
- Empis lachaisei Daugeron & Grootaert, 2005^{c g}
- Empis lacotheca Frey, 1955^{c g}
- Empis laeta Loew, 1869^{c g}
- Empis laetabilis Collin, 1926^{c g}
- Empis laevigata Loew, 1864^{i c g}
- Empis lagoensis Chvála, 1996^{c g}
- Empis lamellalta Daugeron & Grootaert, 2005^{c g}
- Empis lamellata Daugeron, 1999^{c g}
- Empis lamellimmanis Daugeron, 1999^{c g}
- Empis lamellornata Daugeron, Grootaert & Yang, 2003^{c g}
- Empis laminata Collin, 1927^{c g}
- Empis lamruensis Daugeron & Grootaert, 2003^{c g}
- Empis landbecki Philippi, 1865^{c g}
- Empis languescens Collin, 1933^{c g}
- Empis laniventris Eschscholtz, 1823^{i c g}
- Empis lata Daugeron & Grootaert, 2005^{c g}
- Empis lateralis Collin, 1933^{c g}
- Empis latiptera Chvála, 1985^{c g}
- Empis latrappensis Ouellett, 1942^{i c g}
- Empis latro Frey, 1953^{c g}
- Empis lepidopus Meigen, 1822^{c g}
- Empis leptargyra Frey, 1953^{c g}
- Empis leptogastra Loew, 1863^{i c g b}
- Empis leptomorion Bezzi, 1909^{c g}
- Empis leucopeza Loew, 1873^{c g}
- Empis leucoptera Meigen, 1804^{g}
- Empis leucostigma Bezzi, 1905^{c g}
- Empis leucotricha Collin, 1960^{c g}
- Empis levicula Coquillett, 1895^{i c g}
- Empis levis Loew, 1873^{c g}
- Empis liberialis Collin, 1933^{c g}
- Empis licenti Séguy, 1956^{c g}
- Empis limata Collin, 1927^{c g}
- Empis lindebergi Saigusa, 2012^{g}
- Empis linderi Oldenberg, 1925^{c g}
- Empis lindneri Smith, 1967^{c g}
- Empis liodes Bezzi, 1909^{c g}
- Empis liosoma Bezzi, 1909^{c g}
- Empis liuxihensis Daugeron, Grootaert & Yang, 2003^{c g}
- Empis livida Linnaeus, 1758^{c g}
- Empis lobalis Thomson, 1869^{c g}
- Empis loewiana Bezzi, 1909^{c g}
- Empis loici Daugeron & Grootaert, 2005^{c g}
- Empis longeoblita Steyskal, 1965^{i c g}
- Empis longicornis Macquart, 1823^{c g}
- Empis longimana Loew, 1871^{c g}
- Empis longipennis Loew, 1868^{c g}
- Empis longirostris Meigen, 1804^{c g}
- Empis longiseta Daugeron & Grootaert, 2005^{c g}
- Empis loripedis Coquillett, 1895^{i c g}
- Empis lucida Zetterstedt, 1838^{c g}
- Empis lucidilabris Bezzi, 1905^{c g}
- Empis lucidiventris Saigusa, 1992^{c g}
- Empis lugens Philippi, 1865^{c g}
- Empis lugubris Loew, 1869^{c g}
- Empis lurida Saigusa, 1992^{c g}
- Empis lutea Meigen, 1804^{c g}
- Empis luteipilosa Saigusa, 1992^{c g}
- Empis luteithorax Collin, 1933^{c g}
- Empis lyneborgi Chvála, 1981^{c g}
- Empis lyra Smith, 1967^{c g}
- Empis lyuchebiensis Shamshev, 2006^{c g}
- Empis macedoniensis (Bequaert, 1962)^{c g}
- Empis machipandensis Smith, 1969^{c g}
- Empis macquarti Becker, 1907^{c g}
- Empis macra Loew, 1867^{c g}
- Empis macropalpa Egger, 1860^{c g}
- Empis macropus Loew, 1858^{c g}
- Empis macrorrhyncha Philippi, 1865^{c g}
- Empis maculata Fabricius, 1781^{c g}
- Empis maerens Loew, 1867^{c g}
- Empis makalaka Smith, 1969^{c g}
- Empis makololo Smith, 1969^{c g}
- Empis malaisei Frey, 1953^{c g}
- Empis malleola Becker, 1887^{c g}
- Empis manca Coquillett, 1895^{i c g}
- Empis mandarina Frey, 1953^{c g}
- Empis maraua Smith, 1962^{c g}
- Empis marginata Brunetti, 1917^{c g}
- Empis mariae Syrovatka, 1991^{c g}
- Empis mashona Smith, 1969^{c g}
- Empis matabele Smith, 1969^{c g}
- Empis matilei Daugeron & Charbonnel, 2000^{c g}
- Empis maviti Smith, 1969^{c g}
- Empis mediasiatica Chvála, 1999^{c g}
- Empis mediocris Becker, 1907^{c g}
- Empis mediterranea (Loew, 1864)^{c g}
- Empis melanderi Arnaud and Birchim, 1966^{i c g}
- Empis melanopa Stephens, 1829^{c g}
- Empis melanotricha Loew, 1873^{c g}
- Empis mellipes Waltl, 1837^{c g}
- Empis menglunensis Daugeron & Grootaert, 2005^{c g}
- Empis mengyangensis Daugeron & Grootaert, 2005^{c g}
- Empis meridionalis Meigen, 1822^{c g}
- Empis mesogramma Loew, 1867^{c g}
- Empis metapleuralis Bezzi, 1909^{c g}
- Empis micans Schiner, 1868^{c g}
- Empis micropyga Bezzi, 1905^{c g}
- Empis microtheca Frey, 1955^{c g}
- Empis mikii Strobl, 1899^{c g}
- Empis minor Frey, 1953^{c g}
- Empis mira (Bigot, 1880)^{i c g}
- Empis miranda Daugeron & Grootaert, 2003^{c g}
- Empis mirandica Chvála, 1981^{c g}
- Empis mirifica Collin, 1960^{c g}
- Empis miripes Collin, 1933^{c g}
- Empis missai Daugeron & Grootaert, 2005^{c g}
- Empis mixopolia Melander, 1902^{i c g}
- Empis modesta Meigen, 1838^{c g}
- Empis modica Collin, 1933^{c g}
- Empis moiwasana (Matsumura, 1915)^{c g}
- Empis mollis Syrovatka, 2000^{c g}
- Empis mollita Collin, 1933^{c g}
- Empis moncayoensis Daugeron, 2000^{c g}
- Empis montana Daugeron, 1997^{c g}
- Empis montezuma Wheeler & Melander, 1901^{c g}
- Empis monticola Loew, 1868^{c g}
- Empis montiradicis James, 1942^{i c g}
- Empis montivaga Daugeron, 2000^{c g}
- Empis montywoodi Sinclair, Brooks & Cumming, 2013^{g}
- Empis morenae Strobl, 1899^{c g}
- Empis morio Fabricius, 1794^{c g}
- Empis morosa Meigen, 1822^{c g}
- Empis multinodosa Frey, 1953^{c g}
- Empis multipennata Melander, 1946^{c g}
- Empis multispina Daugeron, 1999^{c g}
- Empis nabucco Çiftçi, 2012^{g}
- Empis nahaeoensis Daugeron & Grootaert, 2003^{c g}
- Empis namaqua Smith, 1969^{c g}
- Empis namwamba Smith, 1971^{c g}
- Empis nanlinga Daugeron, Grootaert & Yang, 2003^{c g}
- Empis nartshuki Shamsev, 2001^{c g}
- Empis natalensis Smith, 1967^{c g}
- Empis neesoonensis Daugeron, 2005^{c g}
- Empis negrobovi Shamsev, 2001^{c g}
- Empis nevadensis Chvála, 1981^{c g}
- Empis nganga Daugeron & Grootaert, 2003^{c g}
- Empis nigerrima Loew, 1862^{c g}
- Empis nigra Villers, 1789^{c g}
- Empis nigricans Meigen, 1804^{c g}
- Empis nigricolor Collin, 1933^{c g}
- Empis nigricoma Loew, 1867^{c g}
- Empis nigricrus Gmelin, 1790^{c g}
- Empis nigrimana Becker, 1907^{c g}
- Empis nigripes Fabricius, 1794^{c g}
- Empis nigrisquama Smith, 1969^{c g}
- Empis nigritarsis Meigen, 1804^{c g}
- Empis nigritibialis Strobl, 1898^{c g}
- Empis nigropilosa Collin, 1937^{c g}
- Empis nimbaensis Daugeron & Grootaert, 2005^{c g}
- Empis nitida Meigen, 1804^{c g}
- Empis nitidissima Strobl, 1893^{c g}
- Empis nitidiventris Loew, 1873^{c g}
- Empis nitidula Zetterstedt, 1859^{c g}
- Empis nodipoplitea Steyskal, 1965^{i c g}
- Empis nondouensis Daugeron, 2002^{c g}
- Empis nuda Loew, 1862^{i c g}
- Empis nuntia Meigen, 1822^{c g}
- Empis obesa Loew, 1861^{i c g}
- Empis obscura Macquart, 1827^{c g}
- Empis obscuripes (Loew, 1873)^{c g}
- Empis occlusa Collin, 1960^{c g}
- Empis ochropus Philippi, 1865^{c g}
- Empis odessa Shamsev, 2001^{c g}
- Empis oertus Harris, 1776^{c g}
- Empis ollius Walker, 1849^{i c g}
- Empis omissa Collin, 1933^{c g}
- Empis opaca Meigen, 1804^{c g}
- Empis optabilis Collin, 1933^{c g}
- Empis optiva Collin, 1941^{c g}
- Empis oribi Smith, 1969^{c g}
- Empis ostentator Melander, 1946^{c g}
- Empis otakouensis Miller, 1910^{c g}
- Empis otchontengriensis Shamsev, 2001^{c g}
- Empis otiosa Coquillett, 1895^{i c g}
- Empis oxilara Shamshev, 1998^{c g}
- Empis pachymerina Schiner, 1868^{c g}
- Empis pachymorion Frey, 1935^{c g}
- Empis pachypodiata Bigot, 1889^{c g}
- Empis pachystoma Philippi, 1865^{c g}
- Empis padangensis Daugeron & Grootaert, 2005^{c g}
- Empis pakensis Daugeron & Grootaert, 2003^{c g}
- Empis palaestinensis Engel, 1946^{c g}
- Empis palestinaca (Collin, 1960)^{c g}
- Empis pallida Loew, 1861^{i c g}
- Empis pallipes Olivier, 1791^{c g}
- Empis palustris Scopoli, 1763^{c g}
- Empis pan Frey, 1953^{c g}
- Empis pandellei Daugeron, 1999^{c g}
- Empis pandicauda Collin, 1960^{c g}
- Empis papuana Bezzi, 1904^{c g}
- Empis paralis Collin, 1933^{c g}
- Empis parvula Daugeron & Grootaert, 2005^{c g}
- Empis paschalis Gistel, 1848^{c g}
- Empis patagiata Bezzi, 1914^{c g}
- Empis pavesii Bezzi, 1895^{c g}
- Empis pavli Shamshev, 1998^{c g}
- Empis pectinata Sinclair, 2013^{g}
- Empis pedispinosa Daugeron, Grootaert & Yang, 2003^{c g}
- Empis pegasus Osten Sacken, 1887^{c g}
- Empis pellucida Coquillett, 1900^{i c g}
- Empis penicillata Brooks, Sinclair & Cumming, 2013^{g}
- Empis pennata Panzer, 1803^{c g}
- Empis pennipes Linnaeus, 1758^{c g}
- Empis penniventris Bezzi, 1909^{c g}
- Empis peregrina (Melander, 1902)^{i c g}
- Empis perpendicularis Loew, 1858^{c g}
- Empis perpusilla Collin, 1933^{c g}
- Empis persimilis Frey, 1953^{c g}
- Empis petulans Becker, 1910^{c g}
- Empis pexata Collin, 1960^{c g}
- Empis phaenomeris Loew, 1868^{c g}
- Empis picena Bezzi, 1899^{c g}
- Empis picipes Meigen, 1804^{c g}
- Empis pilicornis Loew, 1867^{c g}
- Empis pilimana Loew, 1869^{c g}
- Empis pilosa Loew, 1867^{c g}
- Empis pilositarsis Frey, 1953^{c g}
- Empis planetica Collin, 1927^{c g}
- Empis plebeja Loew, 1873^{c g}
- Empis plectrum Melander, 1946^{i c g}
- Empis pleurica (Collin, 1960)^{c g}
- Empis plorans Bezzi, 1912^{c g}
- Empis plumata Daugeron, 2001^{c g}
- Empis podagra Melander, 1902^{i c g}
- Empis podagrica Meigen, 1830^{c g}
- Empis poeciloptera Loew, 1861^{i c g}
- Empis poecilosoma Melander, 1946^{c g}
- Empis polita Macquart, 1838^{c g}
- Empis politea Loew, 1863^{i g}
- Empis ponti Chvála, 1996^{c g}
- Empis poplitea Loew, 1863^{c g}
- Empis portia Smith, 1971^{c g}
- Empis praecox Loew, 1867^{c g}
- Empis praevia Collin, 1927^{c g}
- Empis probata Collin, 1928^{c g}
- Empis proboprocera Daugeron, 2000^{c g}
- Empis procera Loew, 1873^{c g}
- Empis prodigiosa Cumming, 2013^{g}
- Empis prodromus Loew, 1867^{c g}
- Empis producta Daugeron, 2005^{c g}
- Empis projecta Daugeron & Grootaert, 2005^{c g}
- Empis prolongata Wang, Li & Yang, 2010^{g}
- Empis prompta Collin, 1933^{c g}
- Empis protarsalis Collin, 1927^{c g}
- Empis proxima Meigen, 1838^{c g}
- Empis pruinosa Wiedemann, 1824^{c g}
- Empis przhevalskii Shamshev, 2006^{c g}
- Empis pseudodecora Strobl, 1898^{c g}
- Empis pseudofasciculata Syrovatka, 2000^{c g}
- Empis pseudomalleola Strobl, 1893^{c g}
- Empis pseudonahaeoensis Daugeron & Grootaert, 2005^{c g}
- Empis pseudonuntia Syrovatka, 1991^{c g}
- Empis pseudoprodromus Collin, 1969^{c g}
- Empis pseudorufiventris (Bequaert, 1962)^{c g}
- Empis pseudosemicinerea Daugeron, 2000^{c g}
- Empis pseudosetitarsus Daugeron & Grootaert, 2003^{c g}
- Empis pseudospinotibialis Daugeron & Grootaert, 2003^{c g}
- Empis pteropoda Egger, 1860^{c g}
- Empis ptilocnemis (Loew, 1873)^{c g}
- Empis ptilopoda Wiedemann, 1822^{c g}
- Empis pudica (Loew, 1861)^{i c g}
- Empis pulchra Saigusa, 1964^{c g}
- Empis pulchripes Loew, 1869^{c g}
- Empis pullata Collin, 1933^{c g}
- Empis punctata Meigen, 1804^{c g}
- Empis purgata (Cederhielm, 1798)^{c g}
- Empis pusio Egger, 1860^{c g}
- Empis quadrilineata Gmelin, 1790^{c g}
- Empis quadrimanus Frey, 1953^{c g}
- Empis quadrivittata Lynch Arribalzaga, 1878^{c g}
- Empis rapida Meigen, 1838^{c g}
- Empis raptoria Bezzi, 1912^{c g}
- Empis ratburiensis Daugeron & Grootaert, 2003^{c g}
- Empis rava Loew, 1862^{c g}
- Empis reciproca Walker, 1857^{i c g}
- Empis recordabilis Collin, 1933^{c g}
- Empis retroversa Collin, 1933^{c g}
- Empis richteri Shamshev, 1998^{c g}
- Empis ringdahli (Collin, 1969)^{c g}
- Empis rohaceki Chvála, 1994^{c g}
- Empis rohdendorfi Shamsev, 2001^{c g}
- Empis rostrata Brunetti, 1913^{c g}
- Empis ruficornis (Loew, 1864)^{c g}
- Empis rufipes Gmelin, 1790^{g}
- Empis rufiventris Meigen, 1838^{c g}
- Empis rustica Fallén, 1816^{c g}
- Empis salicina Lioy, 1864^{c g}
- Empis saltans Engel, 1946^{c g}
- Empis samaruensis Daugeron, 2001^{c g}
- Empis sauteriana Bezzi, 1914^{c g}
- Empis scatophagina Melander, 1902^{i c g}
- Empis scaura Loew, 1867^{c g}
- Empis sciloptera Wiedemann, 1830^{c g}
- Empis scoparia Coquillett, 1903^{i c g}
- Empis scopulifera Bezzi, 1912^{c g}
- Empis scotica Curtis, 1835^{c g}
- Empis scutellata Curtis, 1835^{c g}
- Empis sedelnikovi Shamshev, 2006^{c g}
- Empis semicinerea Loew, 1867^{c g}
- Empis seminitida Frey, 1955^{c g}
- Empis sericans Brullé, 1833^{c g}
- Empis sericata White, 1916^{c g}
- Empis sericea Olivier, 1791^{c g}
- Empis serotina Loew, 1867^{c g}
- Empis serrata Schrank, 1803^{c g}
- Empis sesquata (Ito, 1961)^{c g}
- Empis setigera Loew, 1869^{c g}
- Empis setitarsus Smith, 1969^{c g}
- Empis setosa Loew, 1867^{c g}
- Empis sevanensis Shamshev, 2001^{c g}
- Empis shatalkini Shamshev, 2002^{c g}
- Empis shennongana Wang, Li & Yang, 2010^{g}
- Empis shumana Smith, 1962^{c g}
- Empis shushaensis Shamshev, 2001^{c g}
- Empis sibillina Bezzi, 1899^{c g}
- Empis sicula Loew, 1867^{c g}
- Empis similis Becker, 1908^{c g}
- Empis simulium (Nowicki, 1868)^{c g}
- Empis sinensis Melander, 1946^{c g}
- Empis singulare Daugeron, 2001^{c g}
- Empis sinuosa Daugeron, 1999^{c g}
- Empis sjoestedti Frey, 1935^{c g}
- Empis skufini Shamshev, 2003^{c g}
- Empis snoddyi Steyskal, 1969^{i c g b}
- Empis socrus Syrovatka, 1983^{c g}
- Empis sordida Loew, 1861^{i c g}
- Empis soror Collin, 1937^{c g}
- Empis sororia (Collin, 1960)^{c g}
- Empis spectabilis Loew, 1862^{i c g b}
- Empis specularis Bezzi, 1909^{c g}
- Empis spinifemorata Daugeron, 2000^{c g}
- Empis spinifera Bezzi, 1909^{c g}
- Empis spinosa Daugeron & Grootaert, 2003^{c g}
- Empis spinotibialis Daugeron & Grootaert, 2003^{c g}
- Empis spiralis Collin, 1937^{c g}
- Empis spirifera Bezzi, 1909^{c g}
- Empis spitzeri Chvála, 1977^{c g}
- Empis splendidella Frey, 1953^{c g}
- Empis spungaberaensis Daugeron & Grootaert, 2003^{c g}
- Empis squamipes Coquillett, 1903^{c g}
- Empis staegeri Collin, 1963^{c g}
- Empis stenoptera Loew, 1864^{i c g}
- Empis stercorea Linnaeus, 1758, 1760^{c g}
- Empis stigma Waltl, 1837^{c g}
- Empis stigmatica Frey, 1953^{c g}
- Empis strigata Loew, 1867^{c g}
- Empis styriaca Strobl, 1893^{c g}
- Empis subabreviata Frey, 1953^{c g}
- Empis subciliata Loew, 1871^{c g}
- Empis subcilipes Brunetti, 1913^{c g}
- Empis subclavata (Loew, 1873)^{c g}
- Empis suberis Becker, 1907^{c g}
- Empis subinfumata Malloch, 1923^{i c g}
- Empis submetallica Daugeron & Grootaert, 2005^{c g}
- Empis subnitida Becker, 1914^{c g}
- Empis subpatagiata Frey, 1953^{c g}
- Empis subpennata Macquart, 1827^{c g}
- Empis subscutellata Shamshev, 1998^{c g}
- Empis sugonyaevi Shamsev, 2001^{c g}
- Empis surata Kuntze, 1907^{c g}
- Empis syriaca Collin, 1937^{c g}
- Empis syrovatkai Chvála, 1985^{c g}
- Empis syusiroiana Frey, 1953^{c g}
- Empis tajikistanica Chvála, 1999^{c g}
- Empis talyshensis Shamshev, 2006^{c g}
- Empis tanysphyra Loew, 1873^{c g}
- Empis tashkentensis Shamshev, 2006^{c g}
- Empis tasmaniensis Smith, 1989^{c g}
- Empis tenebrosa Coquillett, 1895^{c g}
- Empis tenera Syrovatka, 1983^{c g}
- Empis tenuinervis Bezzi, 1912^{c g}
- Empis tenuipes Loew, 1869^{c g}
- Empis teres Melander, 1902^{i c g}
- Empis tersa Coquillett, 1895^{i c g}
- Empis tessellata Fabricius, 1794^{c g}
- Empis testacea Fabricius, 1805^{c g}
- Empis testiculata Bezzi, 1909^{c g}
- Empis thalhammeri Strobl, 1898^{c g}
- Empis thapensis Daugeron & Grootaert, 2003^{c g}
- Empis theodori (Collin, 1960)^{c g}
- Empis thermophila Wiedemann, 1830^{c g}
- Empis thiasotes Melander, 1946^{c g}
- Empis thomsoni Hardy, 1942^{c g}
- E. tianmushana Li, Saigusa & Yang, 2012^{g}
- Empis tibetensis Shamshev, 2006^{c g}
- Empis tibiaculata Daugeron, Grootaert & Yang, 2003^{c g}
- Empis tibialis Hardy, 1934^{c g}
- Empis tortuosa Daugeron, 2005^{c g}
- Empis totipennis Bellardi, 1861^{c g}
- Empis transbaicalica Shamshev, 2006^{c g}
- Empis trianguligera Strobl, 1898^{c g}
- Empis tribulis Collin, 1933^{c g}
- Empis trichoscelis Collin, 1933^{c g}
- Empis tridentata Coquillett, 1901^{i c g b}
- Empis trigramma Wiedemann, 1822^{c g}
- Empis trilineata Gmelin, 1790^{c g}
- Empis triseta Daugeron, 2005^{c g}
- Empis tristis Loew, 1867^{c g}
- Empis trivittata Macquart, 1827^{c g}
- Empis trochanterata Saigusa, 1992^{c g}
- Empis trunca Daugeron, 1999^{c g}
- Empis tuberculata Saigusa, 1992^{c g}
- Empis tumida Meigen, 1822^{c g}
- Empis turanica Shamshev & Grootaert, 2005^{c g}
- Empis turneri Smith, 1969^{c g}
- Empis ulrichi Chvála, 1999^{c g}
- Empis umbrina Wiedemann, 1822^{c g}
- Empis umslangaani Smith, 1969^{c g}
- Empis umzilai Smith, 1969^{c g}
- Empis unicolor Brullé, 1833^{c g}
- Empis unistriata Becker, 1887^{c g}
- Empis univittata Loew, 1867^{c g}
- Empis uruguayensis Lynch Arribalzaga, 1878^{c g}
- Empis urumae Daugeron & Grootaert, 2005^{c g}
- Empis ussuriensis Collin, 1941^{c g}
- Empis uzbekistanica Chvála, 1999^{c g}
- Empis vaginifer Melander, 1902^{i c g}
- Empis valdiviana Philippi, 1865^{c g}
- Empis valentis Coquillett, 1895^{i c g}
- Empis valga Collin, 1938^{c g}
- Empis validis Adams, 1905^{c g}
- Empis variabilis Bigot, 1857^{c g}
- Empis variegata Meigen, 1804^{c g}
- Empis varipes Loew, 1861^{i c g}
- Empis varzobiensis Shamshev, 2006^{c g}
- Empis velutina Bezzi, 1912^{c g}
- Empis velutinella Frey, 1953^{c g}
- Empis verae Smith, 1969^{c g}
- Empis verralli Collin, 1927^{c g}
- Empis verruca Daugeron, 2005^{c g}
- Empis vetula Smith, 1969^{c g}
- Empis vicaria Frey, 1935^{c g}
- Empis vicina Lynch Arribalzaga, 1878^{c g}
- Empis villosipes Frey, 1953^{c g}
- Empis vina Smith, 1971^{c g}
- Empis virgata Coquillett, 1895^{i c g}
- Empis virgulata Daugeron, 2009^{g}
- Empis vitisalutatoris Daugeron & Grootaert, 2005^{c g}
- Empis vitripennis Meigen, 1822^{c g}
- Empis vockerothi Cumming, 2013^{g}
- Empis volsella Sinclair, 2013^{g}
- Empis volucris Wiedemann, 1822^{c g}
- Empis vumba Smith, 1969^{c g}
- Empis waterhousei Hardy, 1934^{c g}
- Empis woitapensis Daugeron & Grootaert, 2005^{c g}
- Empis woodi Collin, 1927^{c g}
- Empis xanthomelas Saigusa, 1992^{c g}
- Empis xanthopyga Schiner, 1868^{c g}
- Empis xanthotibia Saigusa, 1964^{c g}
- Empis xochitl Wheeler & Melander, 1901^{c g}
- Empis xui Daugeron, Grootaert & Yang, 2003^{c g}
- Empis yaroshenkoi Shamsev & Kustov, 2008^{c g}
- Empis zachardai Chvála, 1999^{c g}
- Empis zaslavskii Shamsev, 2001^{c g}
- Empis zhuae Li, Saigusa et Yang, 2012^{g}
- Empis zhuravskii Shamshev, 2006^{c g}
- Empis zimini Shamshev, 2003^{c g}
- Empis zinovjevae Shamshev, 1998^{c g}
- Empis zlobini Shamshev, 1998^{c g}

Data sources: i = ITIS, c = Catalogue of Life, g = GBIF, b = Bugguide.net
