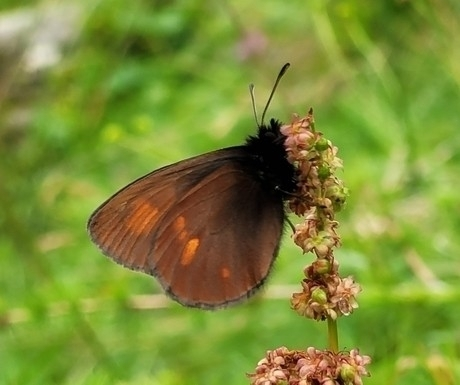

Scientific classification
- Kingdom: Animalia
- Phylum: Arthropoda
- Clade: Pancrustacea
- Class: Insecta
- Order: Lepidoptera
- Family: Nymphalidae
- Genus: Erebia
- Species: E. manto

Binomial name
- Erebia manto (Denis & Schifferumüller, 1775)

= Yellow-spotted ringlet =

Species of butterfly

The yellow-spotted ringlet (Erebia manto) is a member of the subfamily Satyrinae of the family Nymphalidae. It is associated with (sub)alpine meadows at 900–2,500 m above sea level. It is found in the Alps, the Pyrenees, the Cantabrian Mountains, the Massif Central, the Vosges Mountains, the Carpathian Mountains and the mountains of Herzegovina.

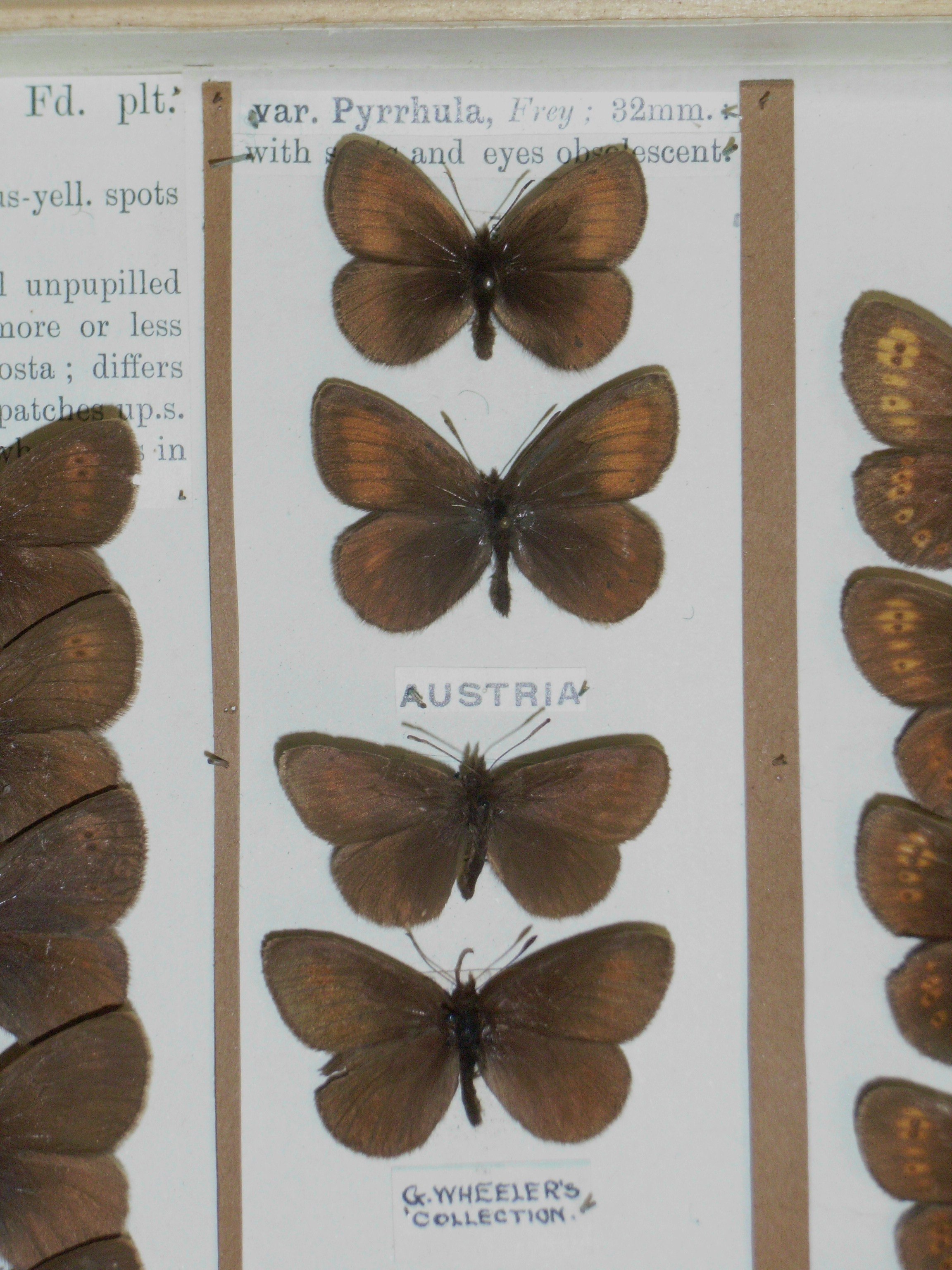
Subspecies pyrrhula Frey described as a species

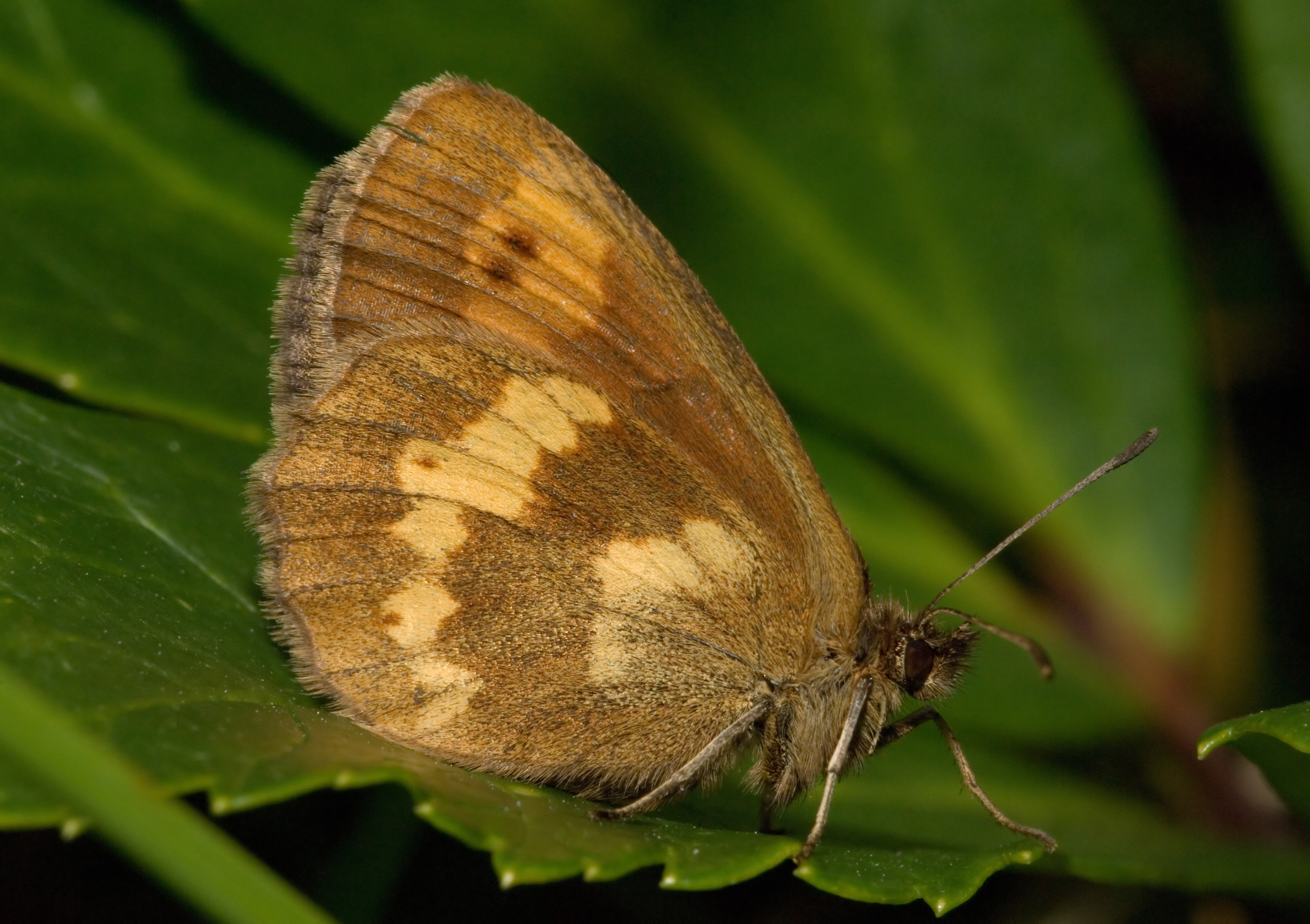

It was first described from Wien (Vienna, Austria).

The wingspan is 25–32 mm.

== Description in Seitz ==
E. manto Esp. (= erina F., pyrrha F., oeme var. Esp.) (36 g). The russet band of the forewing consists mostly only of oval spots, in which there are 2 — 3 black dots. The hindwing has often, but not always, some russet-red small obsolescent spots. The underside is brown in the male, the band of the forewing being more prominent and better defined than above, and is often continuous. The band of the hindwing consists of some russet-red spots, which bear occasionally some black dots. The female is visibly lighter beneath, the central area of the forewing being brownish, the fore and distal margins as well as the hindwing densely dusted with yellowish grey. At the base of the hindwing there are a number of ochreous spots, moreover some yellow spots extend from the costal margin to below the apex of the cell, sometimes merged to a broader abbreviated band, there being often some smaller additional spots near them forming a row which is parallel with the distal margin. Fringes in the male somewhat lighter than the ground colour, in the female grey. The species distributed over the whole chain of the Alps, being plentiful in many places; it occurs on grassy slopes of the alpine and subalpine districts; also on the mountains of the Auvergne and in the Pyrenees, as well as on the mountains of Hungary. In ab. bubastis Meissn. (= pyrrha maccabaeus Frr.) from the northern Central Alps the hindwing beneath bears a white band: the fringes are dark chequered. — ab. caecilia Hbn. (36 g), which is above uniformly black-brown without spots, occurs in Switzerland and the Tyrol among the name-typical form, but is rare. — A similar form with the ground colour more greyish brown but also without markings, flies in the Pyrenees; this is constans Elwes (= caecilia Dup.) (36 g). — In the Swiss and Tyrolese Alps, high above the tree-line, there flies a very small form, pyrrhula Frey (36 h), which is scarcely as large as pharte The forewing has some small streak-like russet- brown spots, in which there are lint rarely- small black dots. The hindwing is without markings as a rule, only occasionally showing small brown wedge-shaped spots. The underside as in manto, just the markings reduced. — trajanus Hormuz. differs from the first described form chiefly on the underside. The forewing of this form is light reddish brown, being dusted with yellowish grey towards the apex and costa; the light reddish yellow band is dentate between the veins both distally and proximally or there are feeble teeth only on the proximal side, the band bearing always two distinct ocelli in cellules 4 and 5. The hindwing greenish grey beneath, the spots of the distal band of different sizes, not being reddish yellow as in the normotypical form, but whitish yellow, the basal spots are completely absent. Distribution-area: Bukowina. — The form from the Vosges has been described as vogesiaca Christ., the females being without light basal spots on the hindwing beneath. — Larva greenish yellow, with the head and legs honey-colour; on the back 2 rows of black comma-spots. Pupa yellow, with lilac markings. The butterfly emerges in 3 weeks from the pupa, which lies free on the ground. The species is plentiful and is on the wing from June to August.

Adults are on wing from July to August.

The larvae feed on Festuca species, mainly Festuca rubra.
