= Archoserica coiffaiti =

Scientific classification
- Kingdom: Animalia
- Phylum: Arthropoda
- Clade: Pancrustacea
- Class: Insecta
- Order: Coleoptera
- Suborder: Polyphaga
- Infraorder: Scarabaeiformia
- Family: Scarabaeidae
- Genus: Archoserica
- Species: A. coiffaiti

Binomial name
- Archoserica coiffaiti Frey, 1972

Species of beetle

Archoserica coiffaiti is a species of beetle of the family Scarabaeidae. It is found in Gabon.

== Description ==
Adults reach a length of about 5-5.5 mm. The lower surface is yellow, while the upper surface is highly variable. Females have a yellow clypeus, while the frons and vertex are blackish-brown. The pronotum is also blackish-brown (except for the lateral margin). A broad stripe at the base of the elytra, the sutural stripe and a marginal stripe are also blackish-brown. Males usually have fewer black markings and are sometimes even uniformly yellow.
