= Elachista melancholica =

Scientific classification
- Domain: Eukaryota
- Kingdom: Animalia
- Phylum: Arthropoda
- Class: Insecta
- Order: Lepidoptera
- Family: Elachistidae
- Genus: Elachista
- Species: E. melancholica

Binomial name
- Elachista melancholica Frey, 1859

Species of moth

Elachista melancholica is a moth in the family Elachistidae. It was described by Heinrich Frey in 1859. It is found in Turkey.
