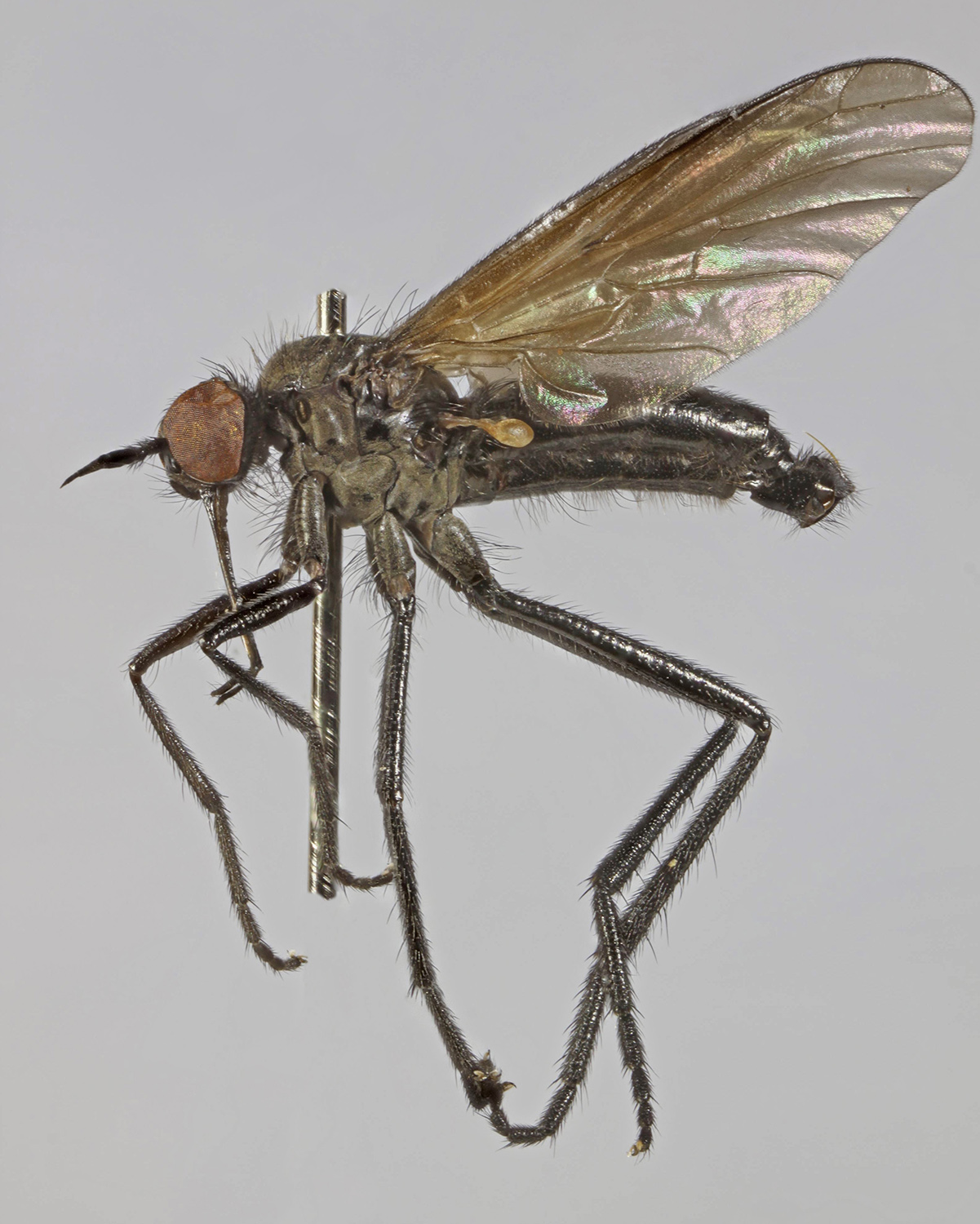
- Empis verralli North Wales

Scientific classification
- Kingdom: Animalia
- Phylum: Arthropoda
- Clade: Pancrustacea
- Class: Insecta
- Order: Diptera
- Family: Empididae
- Subfamily: Empidinae
- Genus: Empis
- Subgenus: Anacrostichus; Bezzi, 1909

Type species
- Empis nitida Meigen, 1804

= Empis (Anacrostichus) =

Subgenus of dance fly

Anacrostichus is a subgenus of dance fly, in the fly family Empididae.

== Species ==
- Empis bistortae Meigen, 1822
- Empis lucida Zetterstedt, 1838
- Empis monticola Loew, 1868
- Empis nitida Meigen, 1804
- Empis verralli Collin, 1927

== See also ==
- List of Empis species
