= Bucculatrix angustata =

Scientific classification
- Kingdom: Animalia
- Phylum: Arthropoda
- Clade: Pancrustacea
- Class: Insecta
- Order: Lepidoptera
- Family: Bucculatricidae
- Genus: Bucculatrix
- Species: B. angustata

Binomial name
- Bucculatrix angustata Frey & Boll, 1876

Synonyms
- Bucculatrix crescentella Braun, 1916

Species of moth

Bucculatrix angustata is a moth in the family Bucculatricidae. It is found in North America, where it has been recorded from the eastern United States to Texas, Utah and Washington. The species was first described by Heinrich Frey and Jacob Boll in 1876.

The wingspan is 7–9 mm. Adults have been recorded on wing from April to October.

The larvae feed on Aster, Solidago and rarely Erigeron species.
