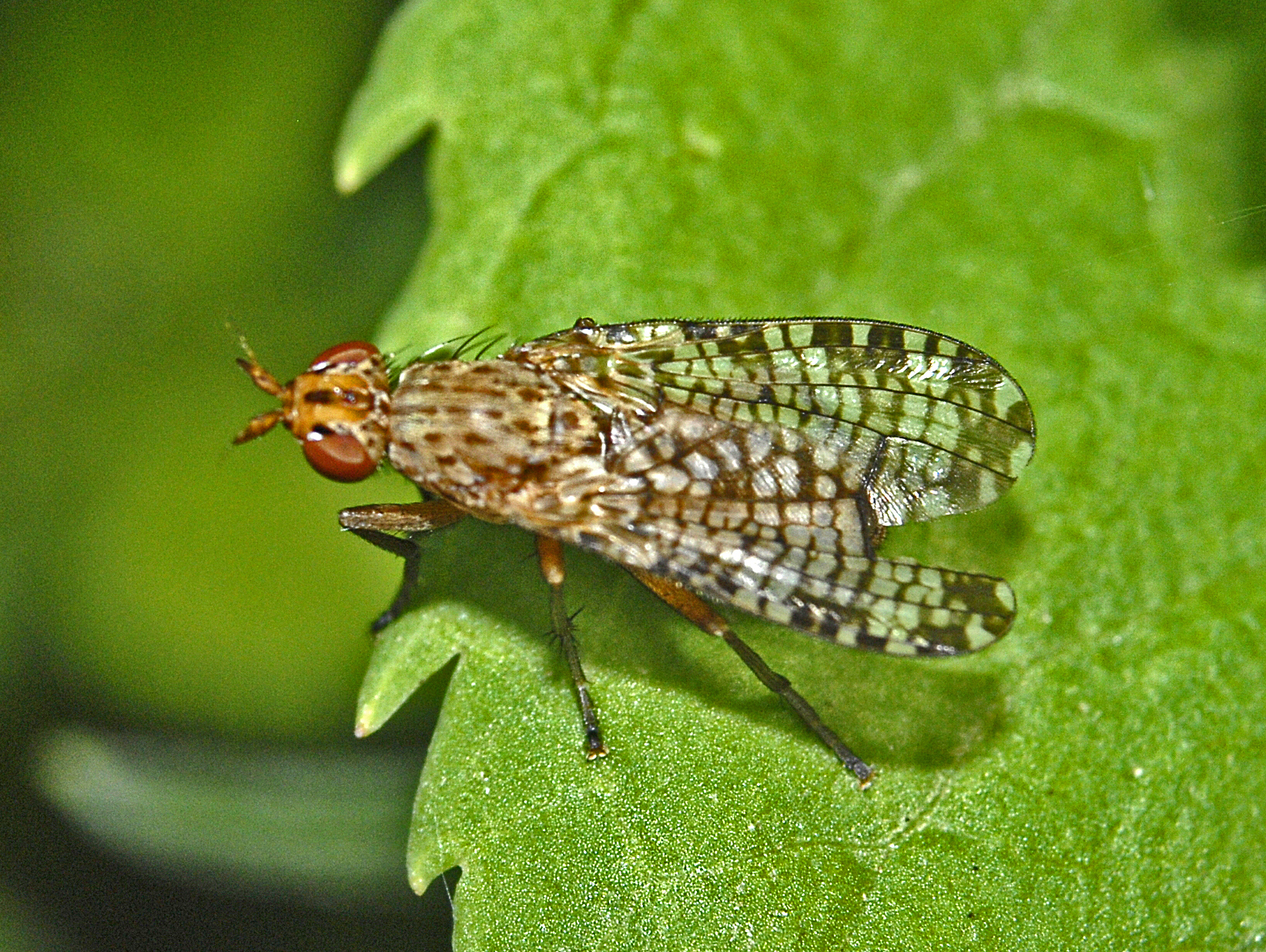
- Euthycera chaerophylli

Scientific classification
- Kingdom: Animalia
- Phylum: Arthropoda
- Class: Insecta
- Order: Diptera
- Family: Sciomyzidae
- Tribe: Tetanocerini
- Genus: Euthycera; Latreille, 1829

Type species
- Musca chaerophylli Fabricius, 1798

Synonyms
- Lunigera Hendel,1900

= Euthycera =

Genus of flies

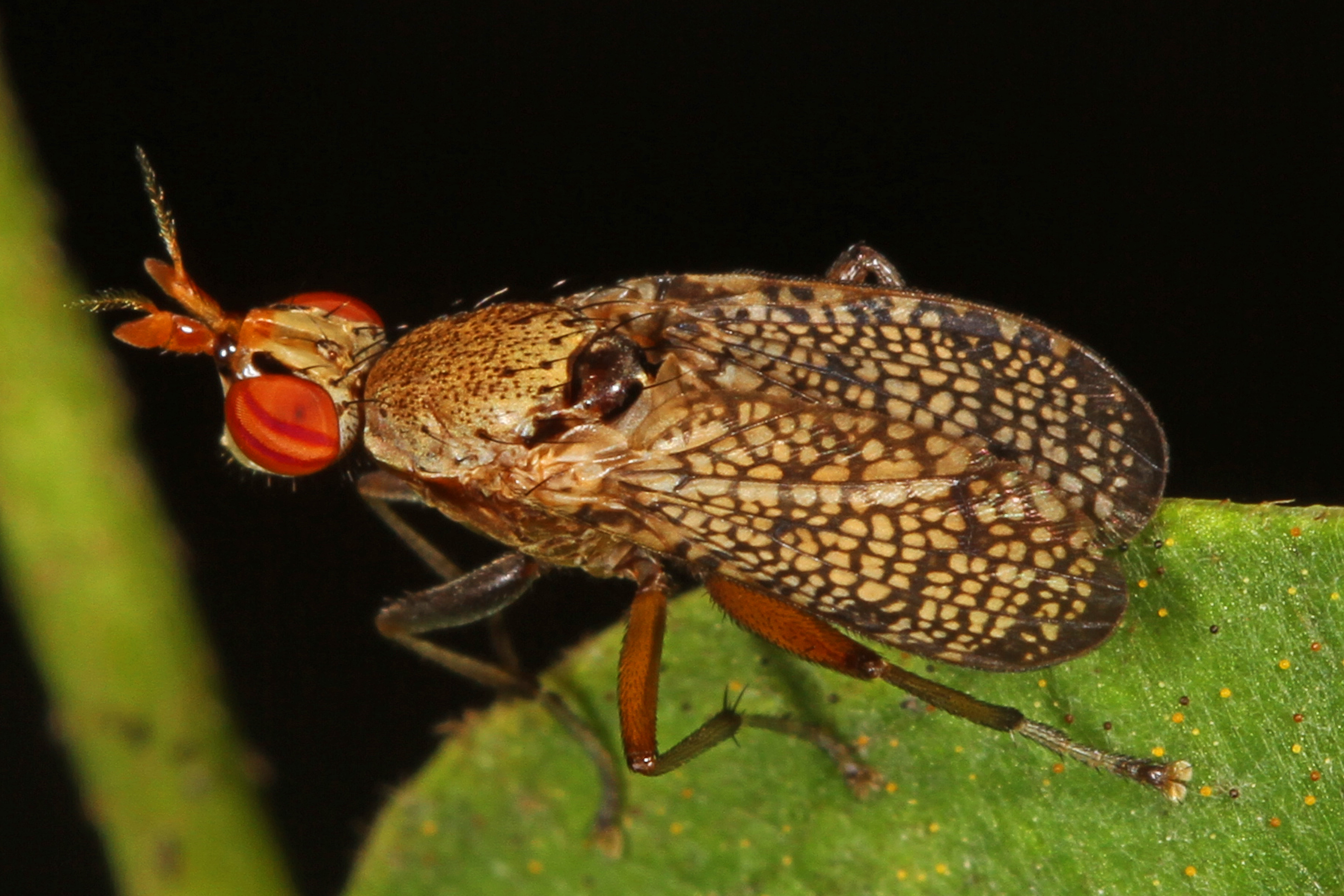
Euthycera arcuata

Euthycera is a genus of flies in the family Sciomyzidae, the marsh flies or snail-killing flies.

== Species ==
- E. alaris Vala, 1983
- E. algira (Macquart, 1849)
- E. alpina (Mayer, 1953)
- E. arcuata (Loew, 1859)
- E. atomaria (Linnaeus, 1767)
- E. chaerophylli (Fabricius, 1798)
- E. cribrata (Rondani, 1868)
- E. flavostriata (Villeneuve, 1912)
- E. formosa (Loew, 1862)
- E. fumigata (Scopoli, 1763)
- E. guanchica Frey, 1936
- E. hrabei Rozkošný, 1969
- E. korneyevi Rozkošný, 2006
- E. leclercqi Vala & Reidenbach, 1982
- E. maculatissima (Strobl, 1906)
- E. mehadiensis (Oldenberg, 1923)
- E. meleagris Hendel, 1934
- E. merzi Rozkošný, 2006
- E. mira Knutson & Zuska, 1968
- E. morio (Mayer, 1953)
- E. nigrescens (Becker, 1907)
- E. prominens (Loew, 1847)
- E. sardoa Contini & Rivosecchi, 1984
- E. seguyi Vala, 1990
- E. soror (Robineau-Desvoidy, 1830)
- E. stichospila (Czerny, 1909)
- E. stictica (Fabricius, 1805)
- E. sticticaria (Mayer, 1953)
- E. stiticaria (Mayer, 1953)
- E. syriaca (Mayer, 1953)
- E. vockerothi Rozkošný, 1988
- E. zelleri (Loew, 1847)
