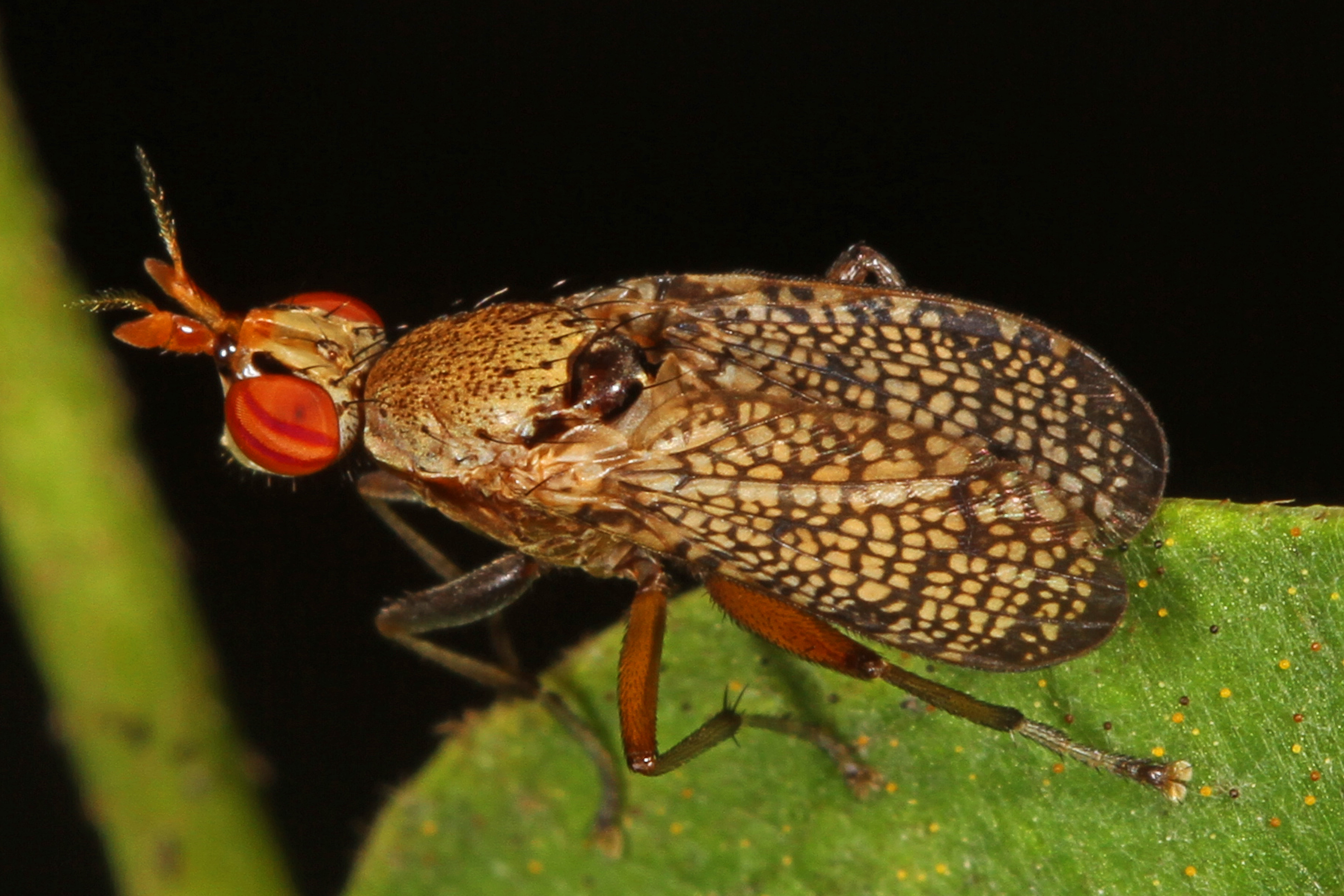

Scientific classification
- Domain: Eukaryota
- Kingdom: Animalia
- Phylum: Arthropoda
- Class: Insecta
- Order: Diptera
- Family: Sciomyzidae
- Genus: Euthycera
- Species: E. arcuata

Binomial name
- Euthycera arcuata (Loew, 1859)

Synonyms
- Euthycera borealis Cresson, 1920; Euthycera uniformis Cresson, 1920; Tetanocera arcuata Loew, 1859; Tetanocera cribraria Harris, 1835; Tetanocera flavescens Loew, 1847

= Euthycera arcuata =

Species of fly

Euthycera arcuata is a species of marsh fly in the family Sciomyzidae.
