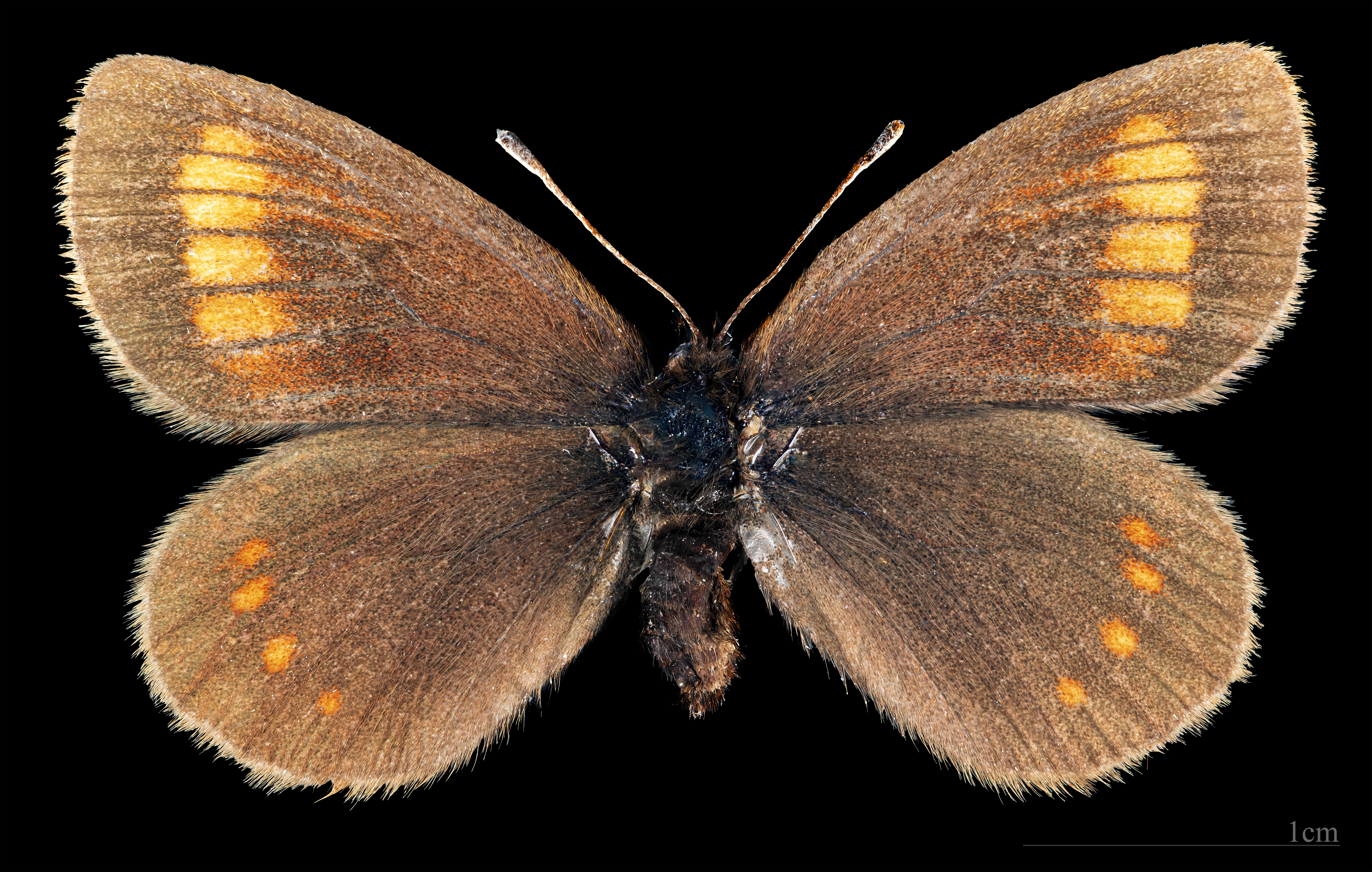
- Erebia pharte ♀
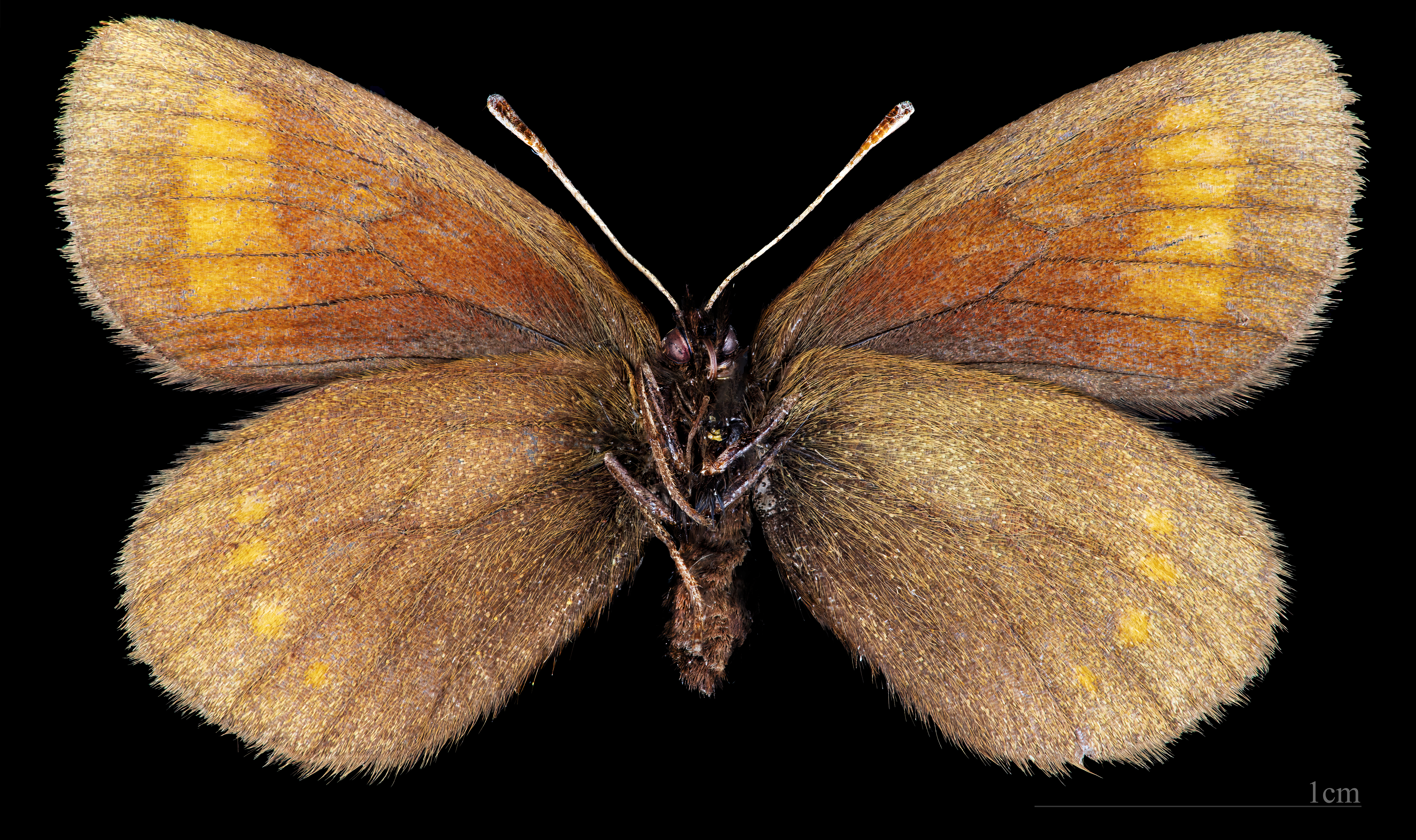
- Erebia pharte ♀ △

Scientific classification
- Kingdom: Animalia
- Phylum: Arthropoda
- Clade: Pancrustacea
- Class: Insecta
- Order: Lepidoptera
- Family: Nymphalidae
- Genus: Erebia
- Species: E. pharte

Binomial name
- Erebia pharte (Hübner, 1803–1804)

= Erebia pharte =

Blind ringlet

Species of butterfly

Erebia pharte, the blind ringlet, is a butterfly of the family Nymphalidae. It is an Alpine butterfly.

== Distribution ==
The species is found in France, Germany, Italy, Liechtenstein, Poland, Romania, Slovakia, Slovenia and Switzerland.

== Description in Seitz ==
E. pharte Hbn. (36 d). Shape and size as in melampus, the forewing however narrower, being more elongate, the apex not so much rounded. The yellowish brown distal band of the forewing is interrupted by the veins, extending usually close to the hindmargin, sometimes only to the centre of the wing. The hindwing has mostly 3—4 yellowish brown spots of different sizes, which are sometimes completely absent or are represented only by some small brown dots. On the underside, the band of the forewing is continuous and somewhat lighter yellow-brown than above, the disc being diffuse red-brown. The hindwing beneath dark brown in the male, the yellow-brown spots being the same as above, only being more prominent. In the lighter coloured female the underside is dusted with greyish yellow, especially at the costal and distal margins of the wings. In the higher Vosges and the Central Alps, especially in swampy meadows, rarely going above the tree -limit. — In ab. phartina Stgr. (36 d) the brown -yellow macular band of the forewing is represented by only 2 — 3 spots of different sizes; the hindwing has only some small obsolescent spots which may even be absent. Occurs singly among the name-typical form, especially at higher altitudes. — The form fasciata Spul., from Carinthia, has a specially dark ground-colour; the band reddish orange in the male, yellowish orange in the female, broader, on the hindwing more extended, with lighter spots as remnants of the ocelli.
