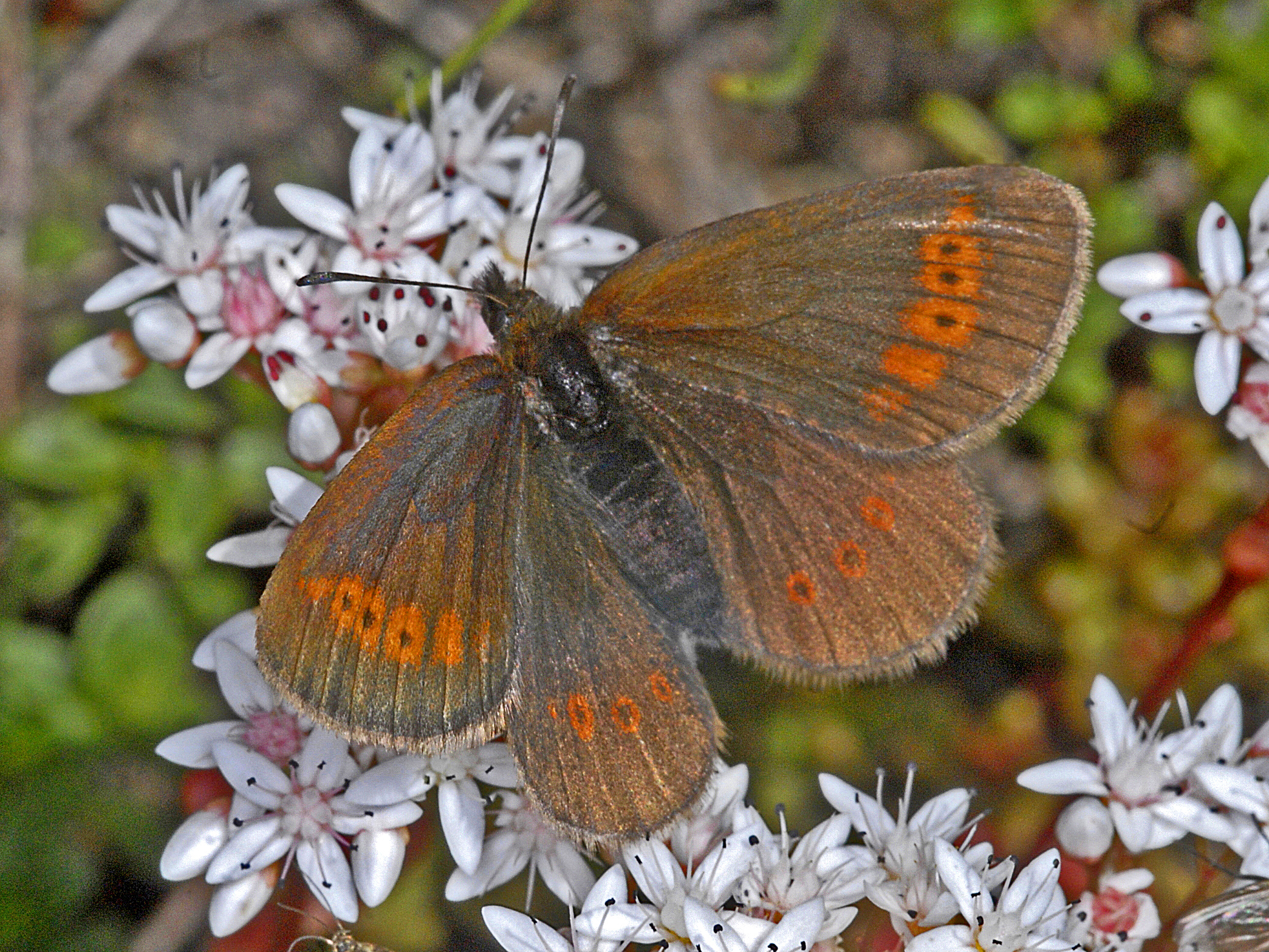
- Upperside
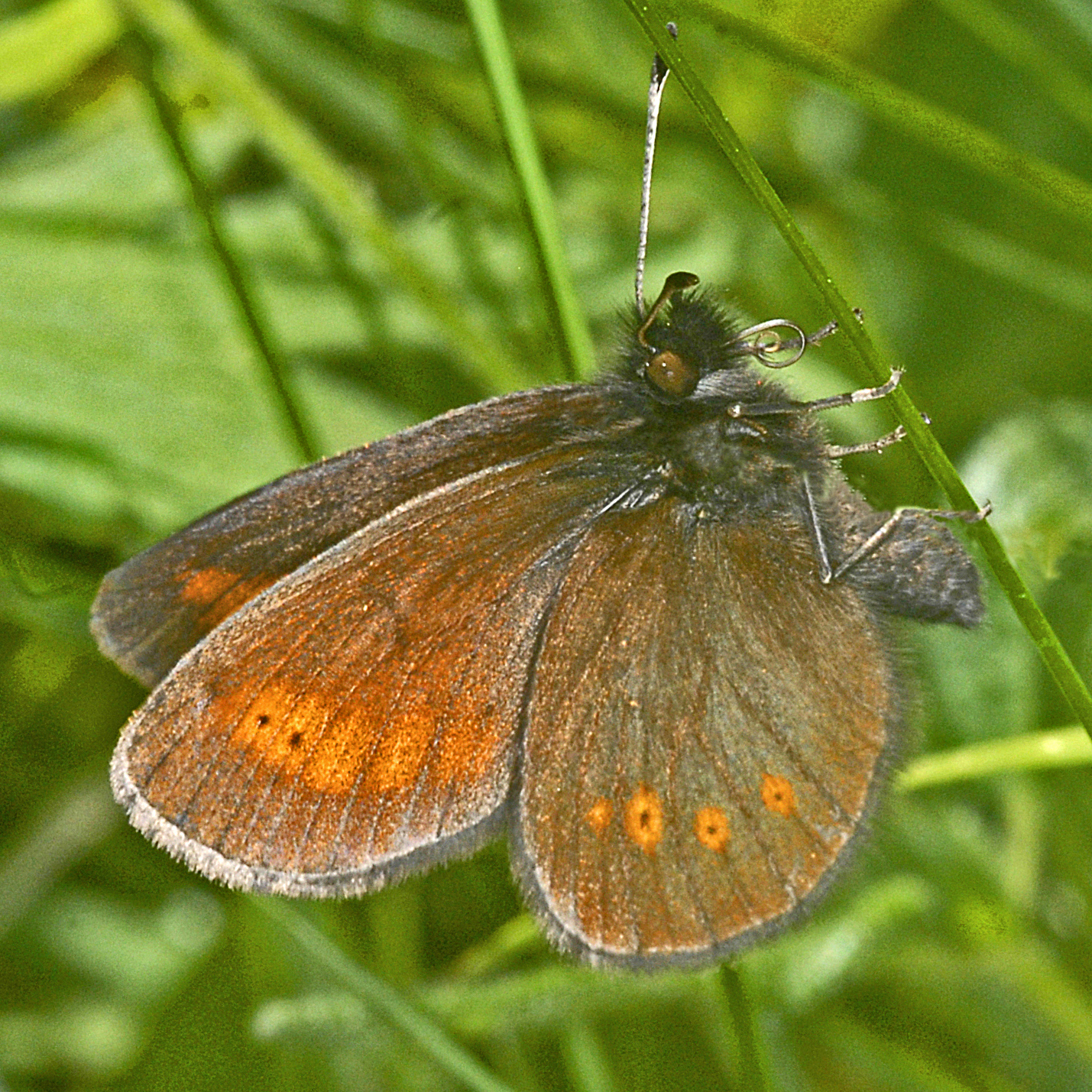
- Underside

Scientific classification
- Kingdom: Animalia
- Phylum: Arthropoda
- Class: Insecta
- Order: Lepidoptera
- Family: Nymphalidae
- Genus: Erebia
- Species: E. melampus

Binomial name
- Erebia melampus (Füssli, 1775)

Synonyms
- Papilio melampus Füssli, 1775; Papilio aetherius Esper, 1805; Papilio janthe Hübner, 1805-1806; Erebia arete Bellier, 1858; Erebia luteofasciata Holtz, 1939

= Erebia melampus =

Lesser mountain ringlet

Species of butterfly

Erebia melampus, the lesser mountain ringlet, is a member of the subfamily Satyrinae of the family Nymphalidae.

== Distribution and habitat ==
This European endemic species occurs in the Alps from the Maritime Alps to eastern Austria (France, Germany, Italy, Liechtenstein, Switzerland and Austria). It prefers grassy places, in woodland or in open areas, at an elevation of 800–2,400 metres (2,600–7,900 ft) above sea level.

== Description ==
The wingspan is 30–36 mm. These small butterflies have brown wings. Forewings show a postmedian band of orange oval to round markings containing small black spots. Hindwings have three or four postdiscal eyespots.

== Description in Seitz ==
E. melampus Fuessl. (= janthe Hbn., aetherius Esp., arete Bell.) (36 b). One of the commonest Erebias of the Alps. Other districts where it occurs are the Pyrenees, the High Tatra and the western and southern Carpathian Mts. The ground-colour is black-brown, the margin reddish grey, the antenna blackish above, whitish grey beneath. The forewing has a russet macular band, interrupted by the veins, bearing in the same 2—3, more rarely 4 black ocelli. On the hindwing there are before the distal margin 3—4 ovate ferruginous spots which bear black dots. The underside is paler, more reddish grey, the band and spots being distinct. The wings of the female are more elongate, the ground-colour and band being lighter than in the male. — On the Altvater in Silesia there occurs the form sudetica Stgr.[now full species Erebia sudetica] (36b); it differs from the alpine form in the distal band of the forewing being broader and lighter and bearing regularly 4, sometimes even 5 black dots, and in the ferruginous yellow spots of the hindwing being larger and being more prominent than in name-typical melampus. — Egg elliptic, longitudinally ribbed, sulphur-yellow, becoming reddish grey before emergence. Larva clay-colour before the last moult, then bright green, with dark dorsal line which is finely bordered with light colour, and with indistinct lighter subdorsal lines which are edged with dark; a lateral stripe light green, above the same the small orange stigmata. Reared on Poa annua. Pupa pale yellowish grey, with darker markings; free on the ground. The butterflies are on the wing in July and August, flying often in great abundance on the grassy alpine meadows and occurring up to 2600 m, their flight being low, slow and straight on.

== Biology ==
Adults are on wing from July to September. The larvae feed on various Festuca and Poa species (Poa annua, Poa nemoralis, Festuca ovina), as well as Anthoxanthum odoratum.

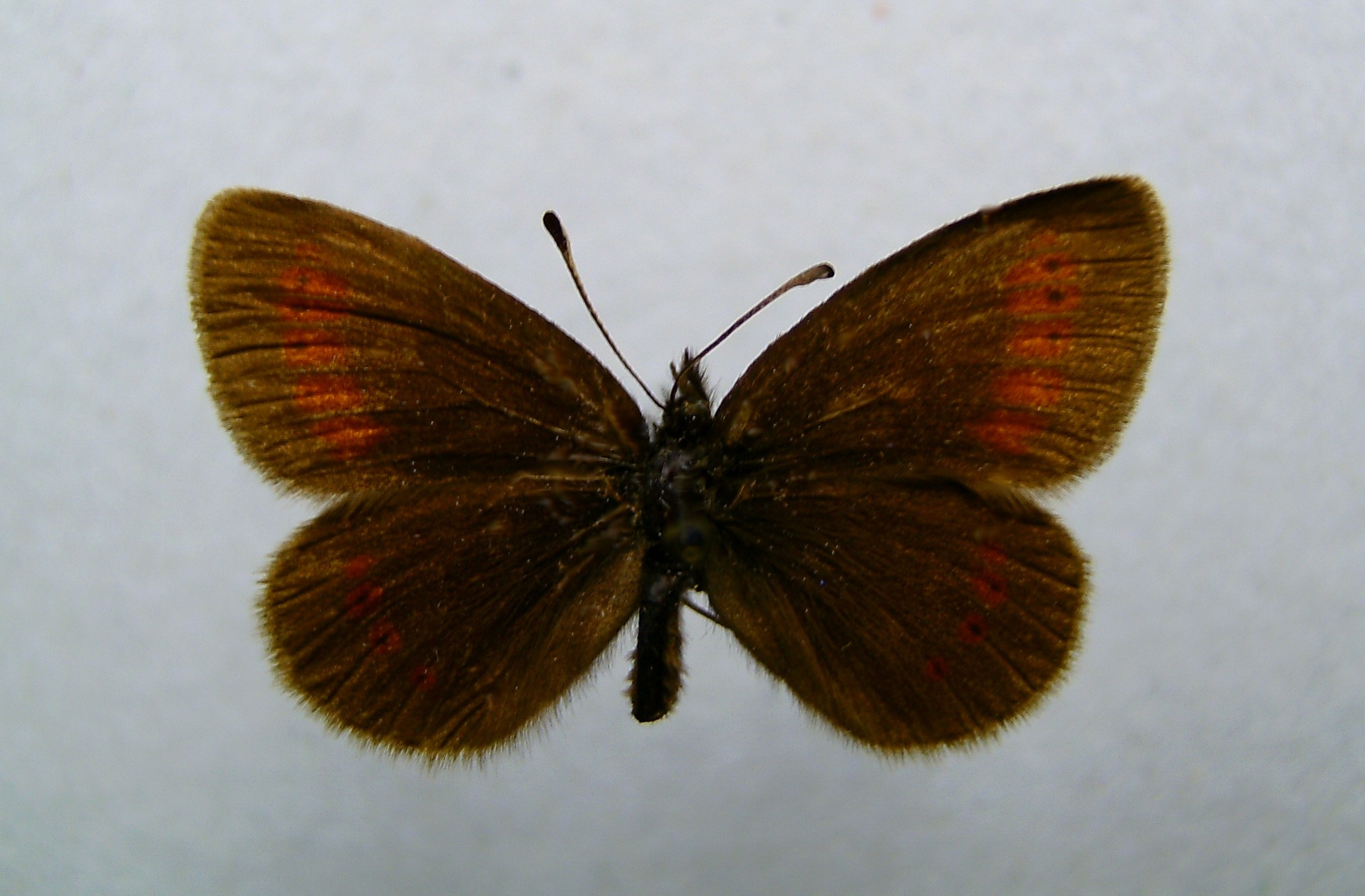

== Bibliography ==
- Guide des papillons d'Europe et d'Afrique du Nord de Tom Tolman, Richard Lewington, éditions Delachaux et Niestlé, 1998 - (ISBN 2603011146)
