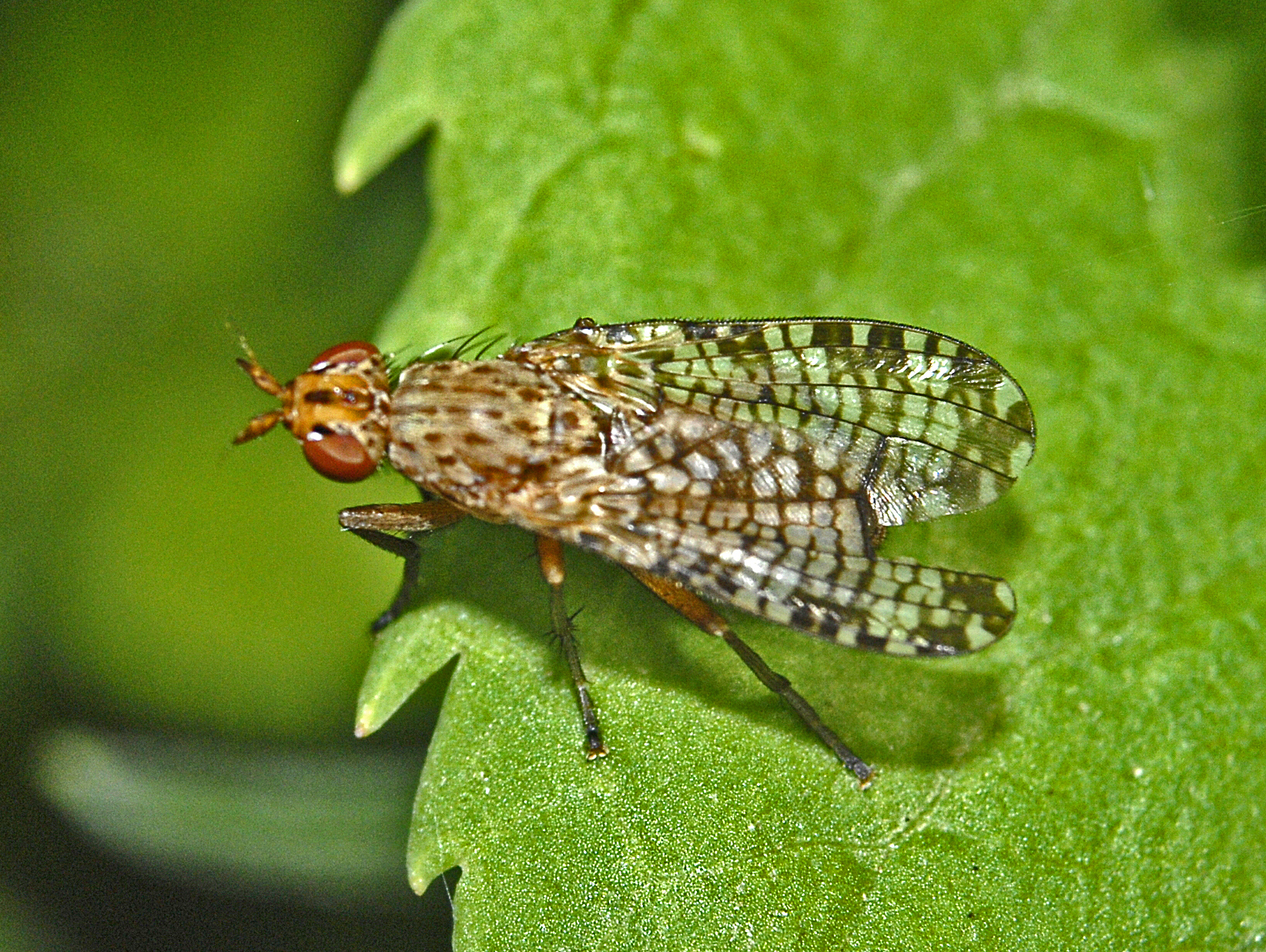

Scientific classification
- Kingdom: Animalia
- Phylum: Arthropoda
- Class: Insecta
- Order: Diptera
- Family: Sciomyzidae
- Genus: Euthycera
- Species: E. chaerophylli

Binomial name
- Euthycera chaerophylli (Fabricius, 1798)

Synonyms
- Lunigera morio Mayer, 1953; Musca chaerophylli Fabricius, 1798; Pherbina flavescens Robineau-Desvoidy, 1830; Tetanocera irrorata Macquart, 1835; Musca variegata De Geer, 1776

= Euthycera chaerophylli =

Species of fly

Euthycera chaerophylli is a species of fly in the family Sciomyzidae, the marsh flies or snail-killing flies.

== Distribution ==
This species can be found in most of Europe and in the Near East.

== Description ==
Euthycera chaerophylli in the near ground vegetation at a pool

Euthycera chaerophylli can reach a length of about 10 millimetres (0.39 in). This fly has a slender body. The gray thorax shows 4 lines of brown spots. The prominent eyes are reddish. The head is yellowish. The yellowish antennae are forward-pointing. The wings are mottled with greyish spots.

== Biology ==
These flies are univoltine and overwinter in the puparia. The larvae develop in slugs. They develop inside body of the host (endoparasitoids), mainly Deroceras species.
