= Archoserica bogosana =

Scientific classification
- Kingdom: Animalia
- Phylum: Arthropoda
- Clade: Pancrustacea
- Class: Insecta
- Order: Coleoptera
- Suborder: Polyphaga
- Infraorder: Scarabaeiformia
- Family: Scarabaeidae
- Genus: Archoserica
- Species: A. bogosana

Binomial name
- Archoserica bogosana Brenske, 1902

Species of beetle

Archoserica bogosana is a species of beetle of the family Scarabaeidae. It is found in Ethiopia.

== Description ==
Adults reach a length of about 5.8 mm. They are dirty yellow and dull, with a silky sheen but without an opalescent luster. The head and legs are shiny. The pronotum is long and narrow, approaching a square shape, with a strongly curved anterior margin projecting forward in the middle and strongly projecting anterior angles. The lateral margin is almost straight, very slightly curved posteriorly, with very faint setae and pointed, slightly rounded posterior angles. The surface is finely punctate. The scutellum is small and narrow. The elytra are irregularly punctate, the intervals alternately weakly raised and more sparsely punctate, the marginal setae are distinct.
