= Empis nitida =

Scientific classification
- Kingdom: Animalia
- Phylum: Arthropoda
- Class: Insecta
- Order: Diptera
- Family: Empididae
- Genus: Empis
- Subgenus: Anacrostichus
- Species: E. nitida

Binomial name
- Empis nitida Meigen, 1804

Species of insect

Empis nitida is a species of fly in the family Empididae. It is included in the subgenus Anacrostichus. It is found in the Palearctic.
