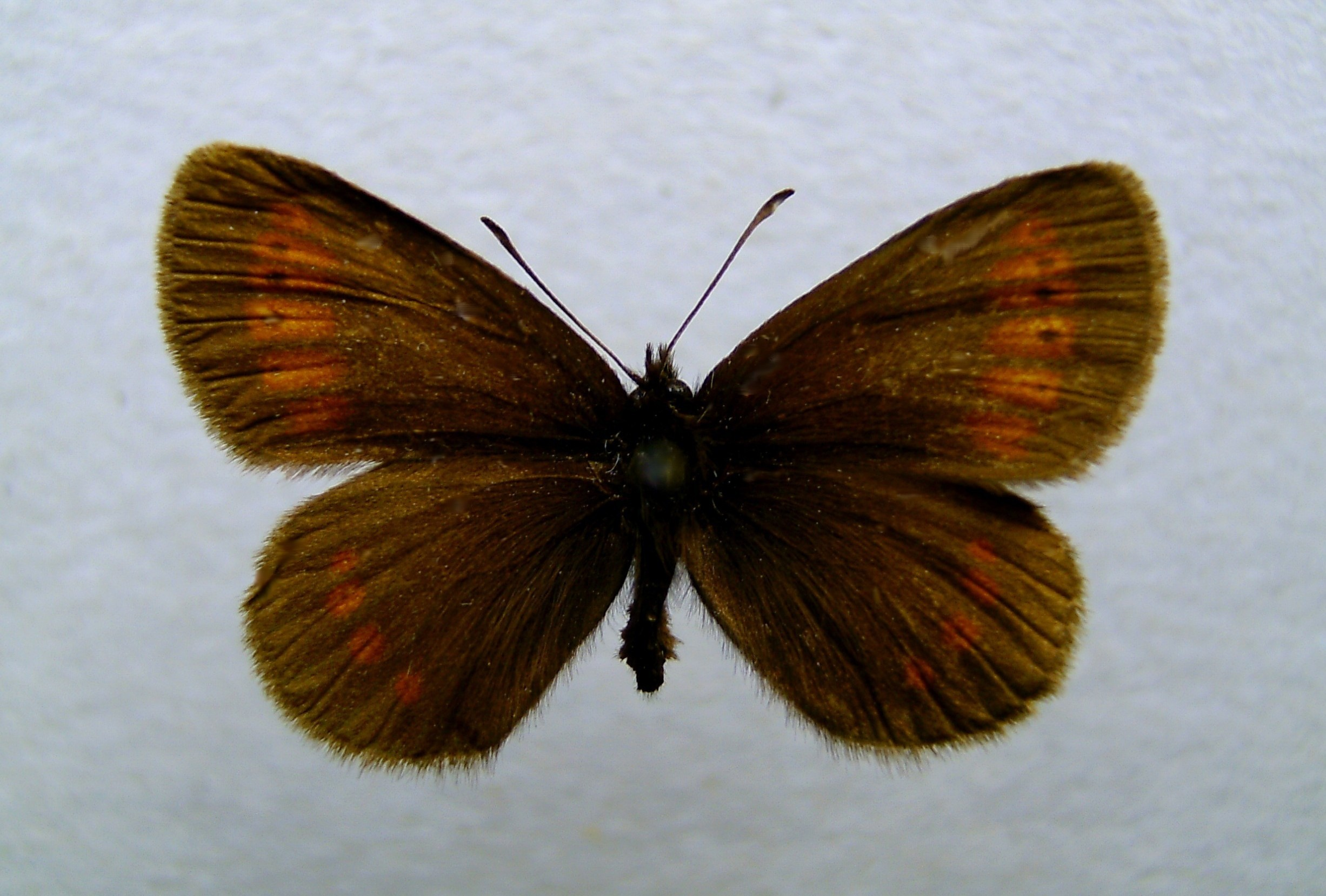

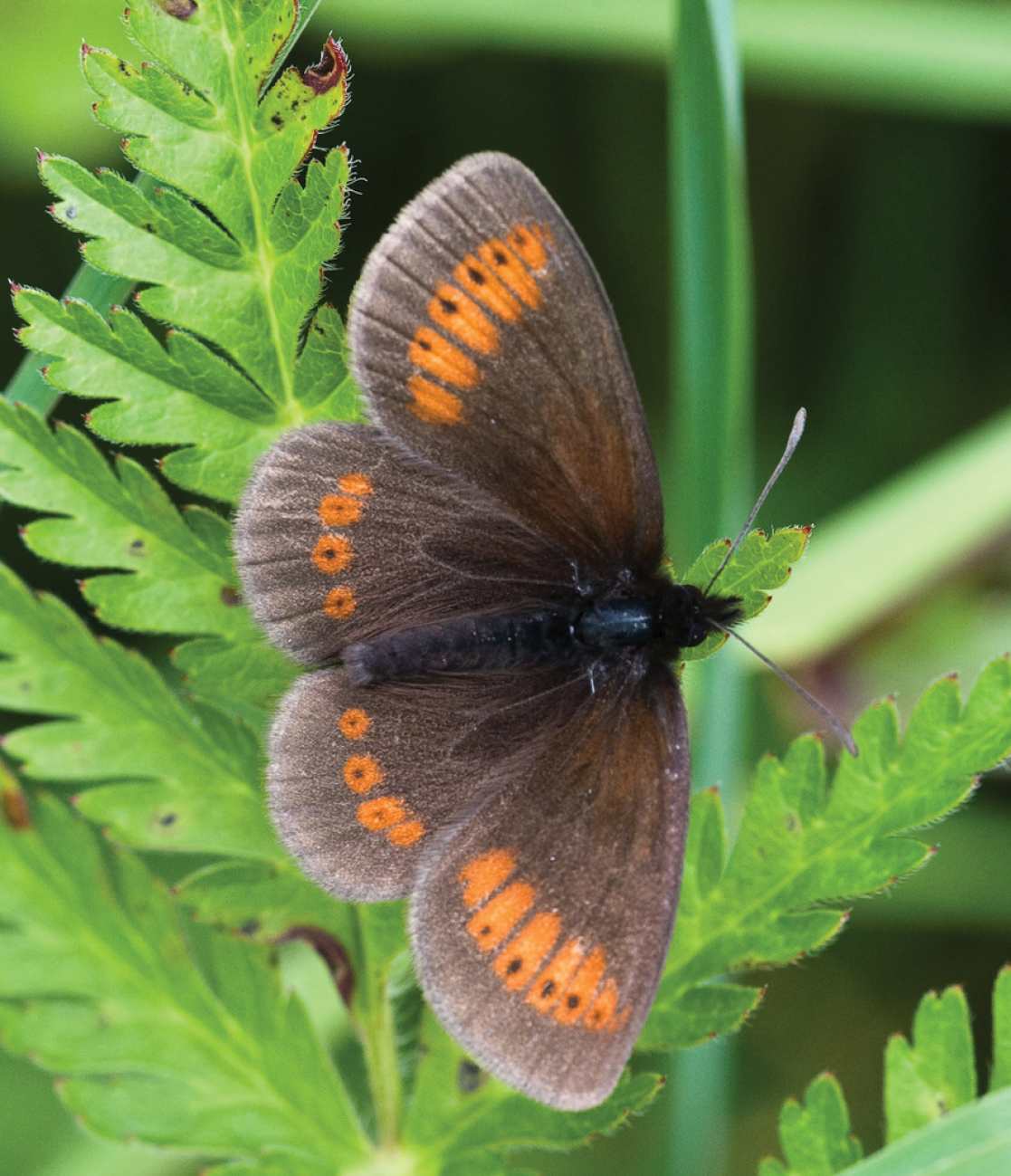

Conservation status
- Vulnerable (IUCN 3.1)

Scientific classification
- Kingdom: Animalia
- Phylum: Arthropoda
- Class: Insecta
- Order: Lepidoptera
- Family: Nymphalidae
- Genus: Erebia
- Species: E. sudetica

Binomial name
- Erebia sudetica Staudinger, 1861

= Sudeten ringlet =

Species of butterfly

The Sudeten ringlet (Erebia sudetica) is a species of butterfly in the family Nymphalidae. It is found in Czech Republic, Poland, Romania, France, and Switzerland. Its natural habitat is temperate grassland. It is threatened by habitat loss.
