= Empis snoddyi =

Scientific classification
- Domain: Eukaryota
- Kingdom: Animalia
- Phylum: Arthropoda
- Class: Insecta
- Order: Diptera
- Family: Empididae
- Genus: Empis
- Species: E. snoddyi

Binomial name
- Empis snoddyi Steyskal, 1969

Species of fly

Empis snoddyi is a species of dance flies in the family Empididae. It is present in the United States, specifically mountainous areas from southern Virginia to northern Georgia. These flies are known for their distinctive mating ritual in which the males offer the females a large empty sack filled with hundreds of silk bubbles.

== Description ==
The thorax and head are darkly colored with grey frosted areas. Eyes are nearly holoptic, meaning that they almost meet in the middle of the head, but there is a slight separation. Legs are yellow with a dark ring where the femur ends. Wings are semi-clear with brown veins throughout. Males and females look quite similar. Two differences are that the separation between the eyes is usually wider in males, and the bristles on the upper part of the leg are shorter in males.

== Behavior ==
Empis snoddyi flies have evolved a mating ritual in which males provide an empty sack filled with silk bubbles as nuptial gifts to females. Other species of Empididae provide nuptial gifts in the form of prey, wrapped prey, or sacks filled with prey, so it is likely that the empty balloons provided by Empis snoddyi relic related to these nutritious nuptial gifts. It has been hypothesized that these balloons are a representation of the male’s fitness, and it has been shown that large males with intermediately sized sacks have the highest mating rate.

The prothoracic basitarsus (a leg segment) in the male produces the silk for the balloon. The balloon complex is made up of air-filled polygons made of silk. The males are able to vary their output of silk, which leads an irregular pattern of different sized polygons.
