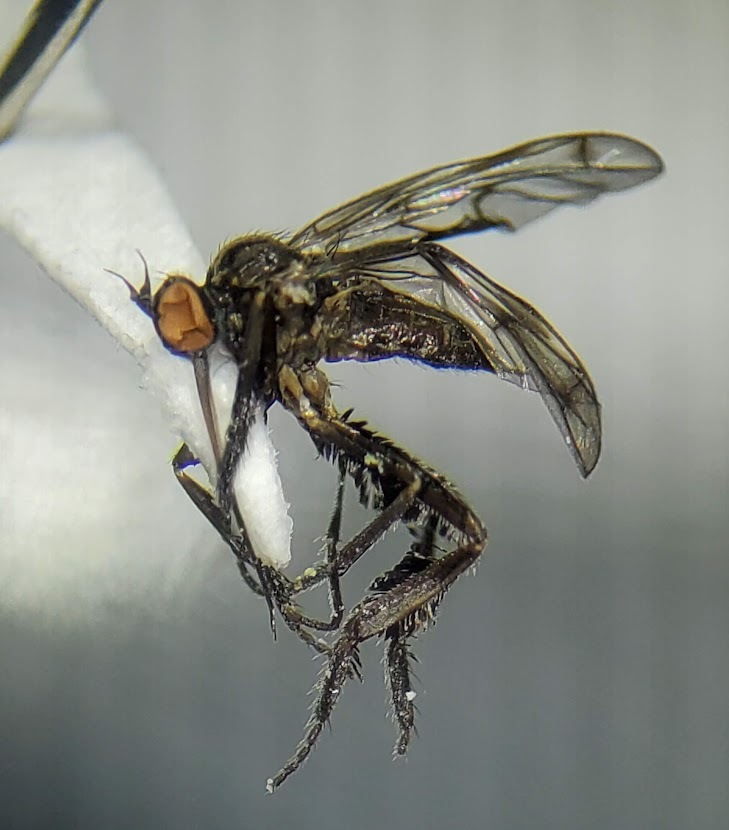

Scientific classification
- Kingdom: Animalia
- Phylum: Arthropoda
- Class: Insecta
- Order: Diptera
- Family: Empididae
- Genus: Empis
- Species: E. clausa

Binomial name
- Empis clausa Coquillett, 1895

= Empis clausa =

Species of fly

Empis clausa is a species of dance fly in the family Empididae. It is a common species in the Midwest and Great Plains regions of North America.
