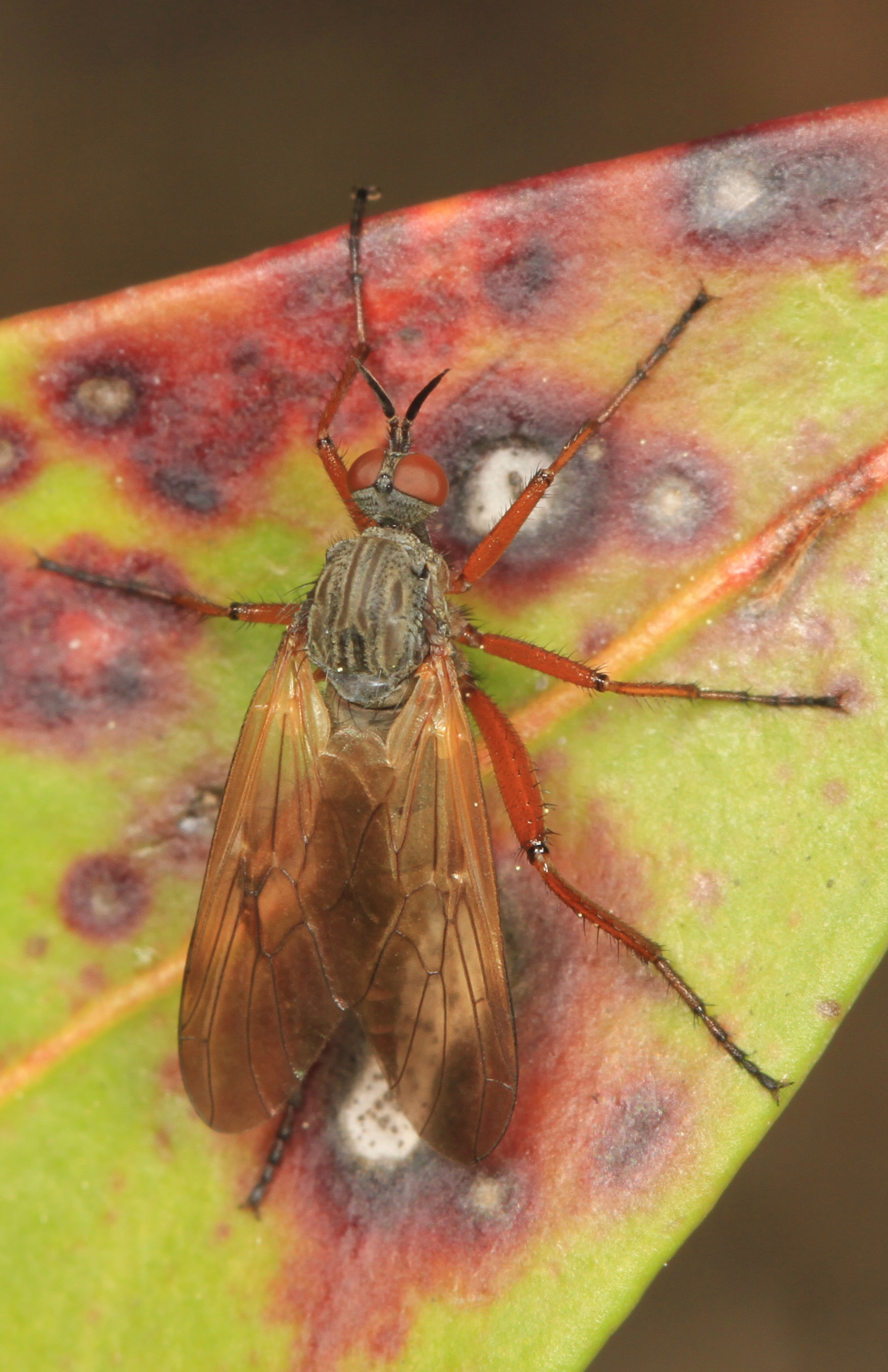

Scientific classification
- Kingdom: Animalia
- Phylum: Arthropoda
- Class: Insecta
- Order: Diptera
- Family: Empididae
- Genus: Empis
- Species: E. spectabilis

Binomial name
- Empis spectabilis Loew, 1862

= Empis spectabilis =

Species of fly

Empis spectabilis is a species of dance flies in the family Empididae.
