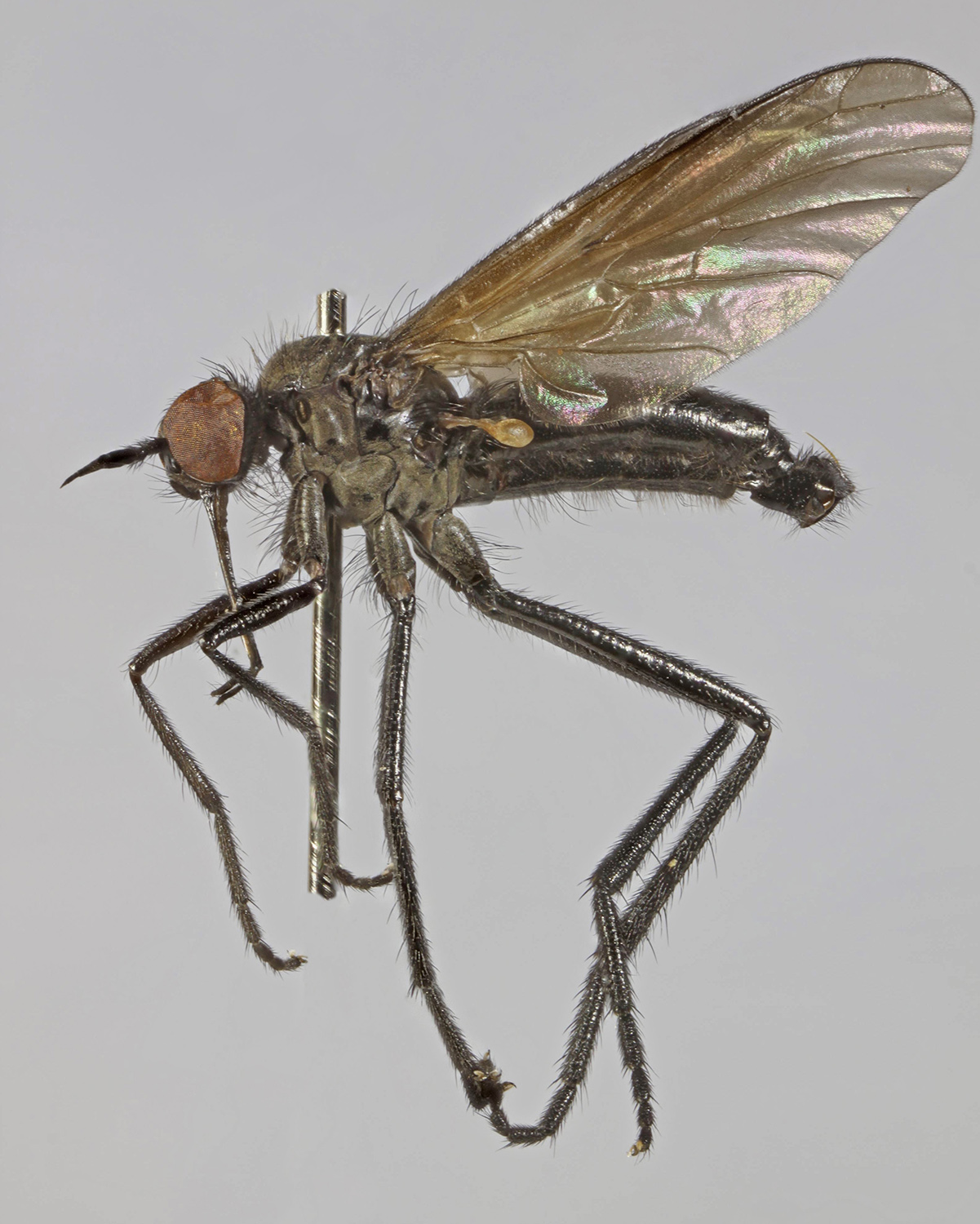
- Empis verralli North Wales

Scientific classification
- Kingdom: Animalia
- Phylum: Arthropoda
- Class: Insecta
- Order: Diptera
- Family: Empididae
- Genus: Empis
- Subgenus: Anacrostichus
- Species: E. verralli

Binomial name
- Empis verralli Collin, 1927

= Empis verralli =

Species of fly

Empis verralli is a species of fly in the family Empididae. It is included in the subgenus Anacrostichus. It is found in the Palearctic.
