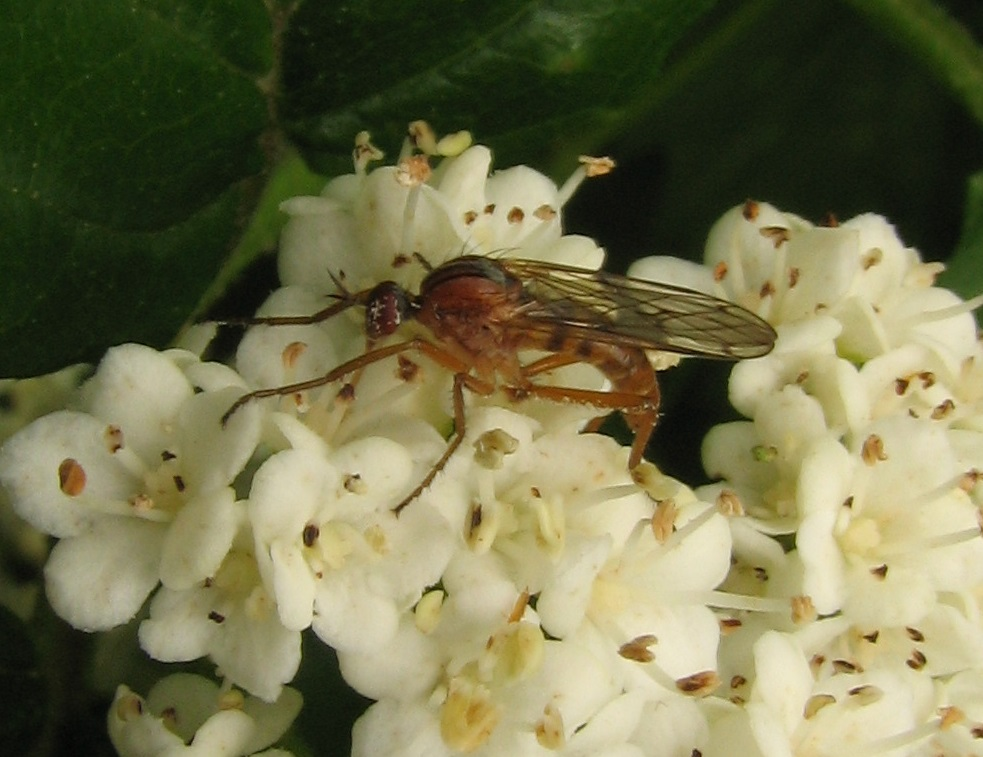
- E. tridentata, female

Scientific classification
- Kingdom: Animalia
- Phylum: Arthropoda
- Class: Insecta
- Order: Diptera
- Family: Empididae
- Genus: Empis
- Species: E. tridentata

Binomial name
- Empis tridentata Coquillett, 1901

= Empis tridentata =

Species of fly

Empis tridentata is a species of dance flies in the family Empididae. Trident-shaped gray mark, points forward, on yellowish thorax.
