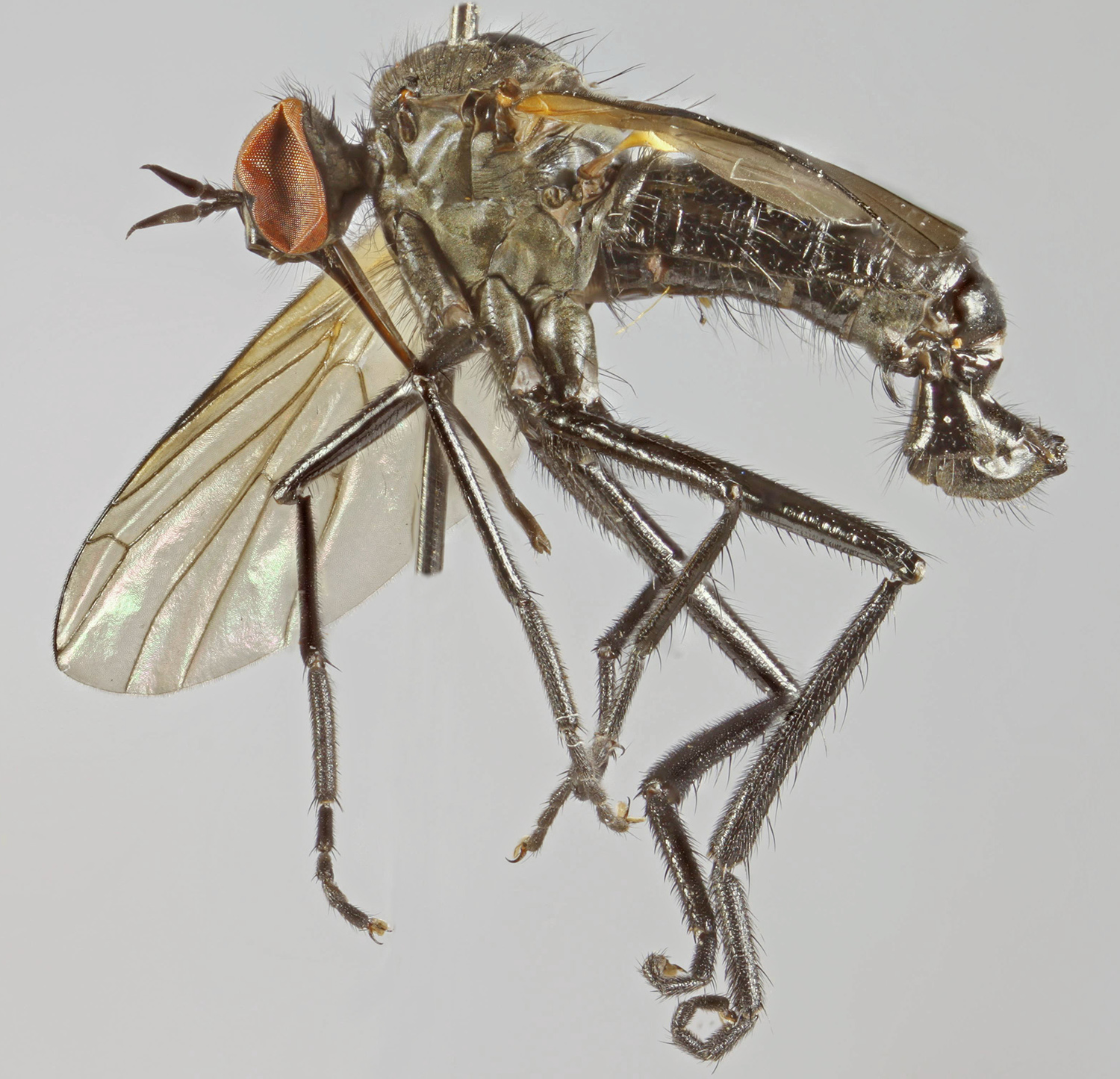
- Empis lucida North Wales

Scientific classification
- Kingdom: Animalia
- Phylum: Arthropoda
- Class: Insecta
- Order: Diptera
- Family: Empididae
- Genus: Empis
- Subgenus: Anacrostichus
- Species: E. lucida

Binomial name
- Empis lucida Zetterstedt, 1838

= Empis lucida =

Species of fly

Empis lucida is a species of fly in the family Empididae. It is included in the subgenus Anacrostichus. It is found in the Palearctic. It is a large (8–10 mm.) shining black species.
