= Empis geneatis =

Scientific classification
- Kingdom: Animalia
- Phylum: Arthropoda
- Class: Insecta
- Order: Diptera
- Family: Empididae
- Genus: Empis
- Species: E. geneatis

Binomial name
- Empis geneatis (Melander, 1902)

Synonyms
- Empimorpha geneatis Melander, 1902

Species of fly

Empis geneatis is a species of dance flies in the family Empididae.
