= Empis leptogastra =

Scientific classification
- Kingdom: Animalia
- Phylum: Arthropoda
- Class: Insecta
- Order: Diptera
- Family: Empididae
- Genus: Empis
- Species: E. leptogastra

Binomial name
- Empis leptogastra Loew, 1863

Species of fly

Empis leptogastra is a species of dance flies in the family Empididae.
