= Empis monticola =

Scientific classification
- Kingdom: Animalia
- Phylum: Arthropoda
- Clade: Pancrustacea
- Class: Insecta
- Order: Diptera
- Family: Empididae
- Genus: Empis
- Subgenus: Anacrostichus
- Species: E. monticola

Binomial name
- Empis monticola Loew, 1868

Species of fly

Empis monticola is a species of fly in the family Empididae. It is included in the subgenus Anacrostichus. It is found in the Palearctic.
