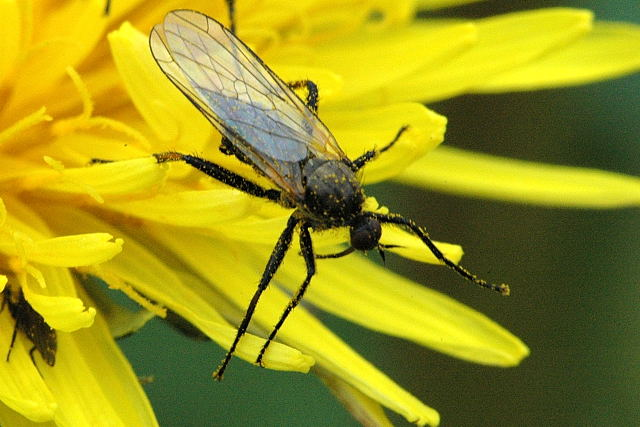
- Empis bistortae

Scientific classification
- Kingdom: Animalia
- Phylum: Arthropoda
- Class: Insecta
- Order: Diptera
- Family: Empididae
- Genus: Empis
- Subgenus: Anacrostichus
- Species: E. bistortae

Binomial name
- Empis bistortae Meigen, 1804

= Empis bistortae =

Species of fly

Empis bistortae is a species of dance flies, in the fly family Empididae. It is included in the subgenus Anacrostichus. It is found from the Benelux, south to the Iberian Peninsula and east to Ukraine. It is not found in Italy and on the Balkan Peninsula.
