= Heinrich Frey =

German-born Swiss entomologist

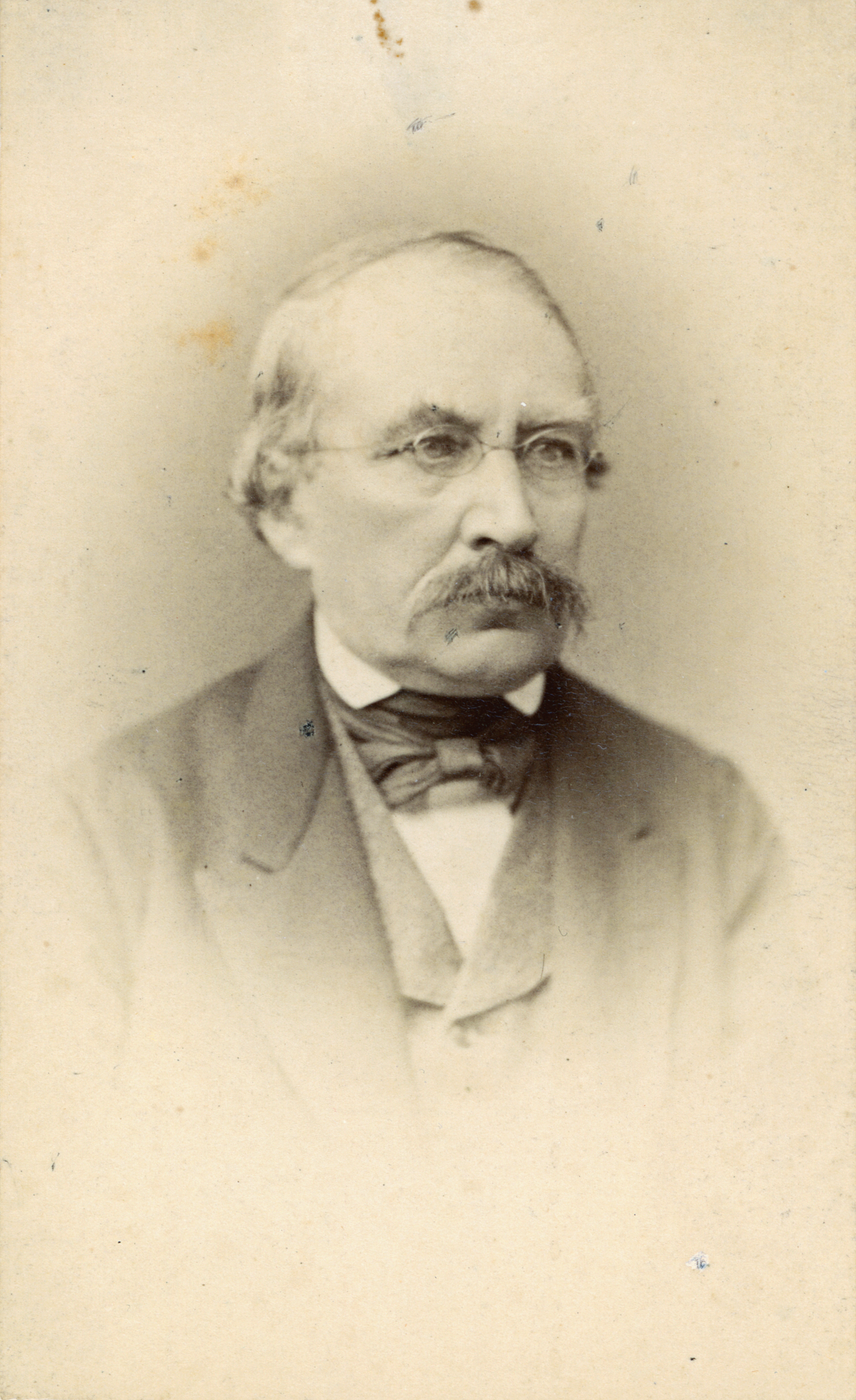
Heinrich Frey

Heinrich Frey (June 15, 1822 – January 17, 1890) was a German-born Swiss entomologist who studied Lepidoptera.

== Biography ==
Heinrich Frey was born on June 15, 1822 in Frankfurt. He attended the gymnasium in Frankfurt until he was 16. Here he met Senator Carl Heinrich Georg von Heyden (1793–1866) who introduced him to entomology. He attended the University in Frankfurt, then travelled to Bonn, Berlin, and Göttingen.

When he returned to Frankfurt am Main in 1839 von Heyden showed him Philipp Christoph Zeller's Attempt at a Classification of the Tineinae which had just appeared in Oken's Isis. Until this publication, this group of moths had been hopelessly confused and Frey was impressed by Zeller's orderly arrangement.

Returning to Göttingen in 1847 he first became a private tutor, then an “extraordinary” professor at the university. (An extraordinary professorial chair is one created by a university because of an application from an outside organisation that feels that a certain field is not given enough attention). In 1849, he was offered a professorial post by the University of Zurich, which he accepted.

In 1851, Frey became an ordinary professor in the Medical Faculty, soon after also becoming a professor at the confederate Polytechnikum. He also became director of the microscopical anatomical institute and from 1854 to 1856 rector of the high school. Frey spent the rest of his life in Switzerland. He died in Zürich on January 17, 1890, at the age of 67.

== Work ==
His most important publications were:

- Heinrich Frey, Der Lepidopteren der Schweiz, W. Engelmann, 1880 Electronic text Der Lepidopteren der Schweiz
- With Henry Tibbats Stainton, Philipp Christoph Zeller and John Douglas parts of The Natural History of the Tineina 13 volumes, 2000 pages 1855 Volumes 2 -13 online here
- Heinrich Frey, Die Tineen und Pterophoren der Schweiz: i-xii, 1-430. Zurich. Gronlien (1856)
- Gaedike, R.; Groll, E. K. & Taeger, A. 2012: Bibliography of the entomological literature from the beginning until 1863 : online database - version 1.0 - Senckenberg Deutsches Entomologisches Institut.

Biodiversity Heritage Library has other works by Heinrich Frey
