= Loewia =

Loewia is the scientific name of two genera of organisms and may refer to:

- Loewia (fly), a genus of insects in the family Tachinidae
- Loewia (plant), a genus of plants in the family Passifloraceae
