= Loewia submetallica =

Scientific classification
- Kingdom: Animalia
- Phylum: Arthropoda
- Clade: Pancrustacea
- Class: Insecta
- Order: Diptera
- Family: Tachinidae
- Subfamily: Tachininae
- Tribe: Ernestiini
- Genus: Loewia
- Species: L. submetallica

Binomial name
- Loewia submetallica (Macquart, 1855)

Synonyms
- Rhinophora submetallica Macquart, 1855; Silbermannia petiolata Pandellé, 1895; Loewia piliceps Mesnil, 1973

Species of fly

Loewia submetallica is a European species of fly in the family Tachinidae.

== Distribution ==
British Isles, Poland, Denmark, Sweden, Bulgaria, Greece, Portugal, Spain, France, Germany, Netherlands, Switzerland.
