= Gymnoglossa munroi =

Scientific classification
- Kingdom: Animalia
- Phylum: Arthropoda
- Class: Insecta
- Order: Diptera
- Family: Tachinidae
- Subfamily: Tachininae
- Tribe: Ernestiini
- Genus: Gymnoglossa
- Species: G. munroi

Binomial name
- Gymnoglossa munroi Curran, 1934

Species of fly

Gymnoglossa munroi is a species of tachinid flies in the genus Gymnoglossa in the family Tachinidae.

== Distribution ==
South Africa.
