= Eloceria delecta =

Scientific classification
- Kingdom: Animalia
- Phylum: Arthropoda
- Clade: Pancrustacea
- Class: Insecta
- Order: Diptera
- Family: Tachinidae
- Subfamily: Tachininae
- Tribe: Ernestiini
- Genus: Eloceria
- Species: E. delecta

Binomial name
- Eloceria delecta (Meigen, 1824)

Synonyms
- Tachina delecta Meigen, 1824; Cerophora funesta Robineau-Desvoidy, 1863; Eloceria macrocera Robineau-Desvoidy, 1863; Thryptocera kowarzi Nowicki, 1868; Stauferia diaphana Brauer & von Bergenstamm, 1889; Thryptocera lithobii Giard, 1893

Species of fly

Eloceria delecta is a European species of fly in the family Tachinidae.
