= Panzeria caesia =

Scientific classification
- Kingdom: Animalia
- Phylum: Arthropoda
- Clade: Pancrustacea
- Class: Insecta
- Order: Diptera
- Family: Tachinidae
- Subfamily: Tachininae
- Tribe: Ernestiini
- Genus: Panzeria
- Species: P. caesia

Binomial name
- Panzeria caesia (Fallén, 1810)

Synonyms
- Tachina caesia Fallén, 1810

Species of fly

Panzeria caesia is a European species of fly in the family Tachinidae.
