= Panzeria nemorum =

- Panzeria nemorum in Wiener Neustadt, Austria

Scientific classification
- Kingdom: Animalia
- Phylum: Arthropoda
- Clade: Pancrustacea
- Class: Insecta
- Order: Diptera
- Family: Tachinidae
- Subfamily: Tachininae
- Tribe: Ernestiini
- Genus: Panzeria
- Species: P. nemorum

Binomial name
- Panzeria nemorum (Meigen, 1824)

Synonyms
- Tachina nemorum Meigen, 1824

Species of fly

Panzeria nemorum is a European species of fly in the family Tachinidae.
