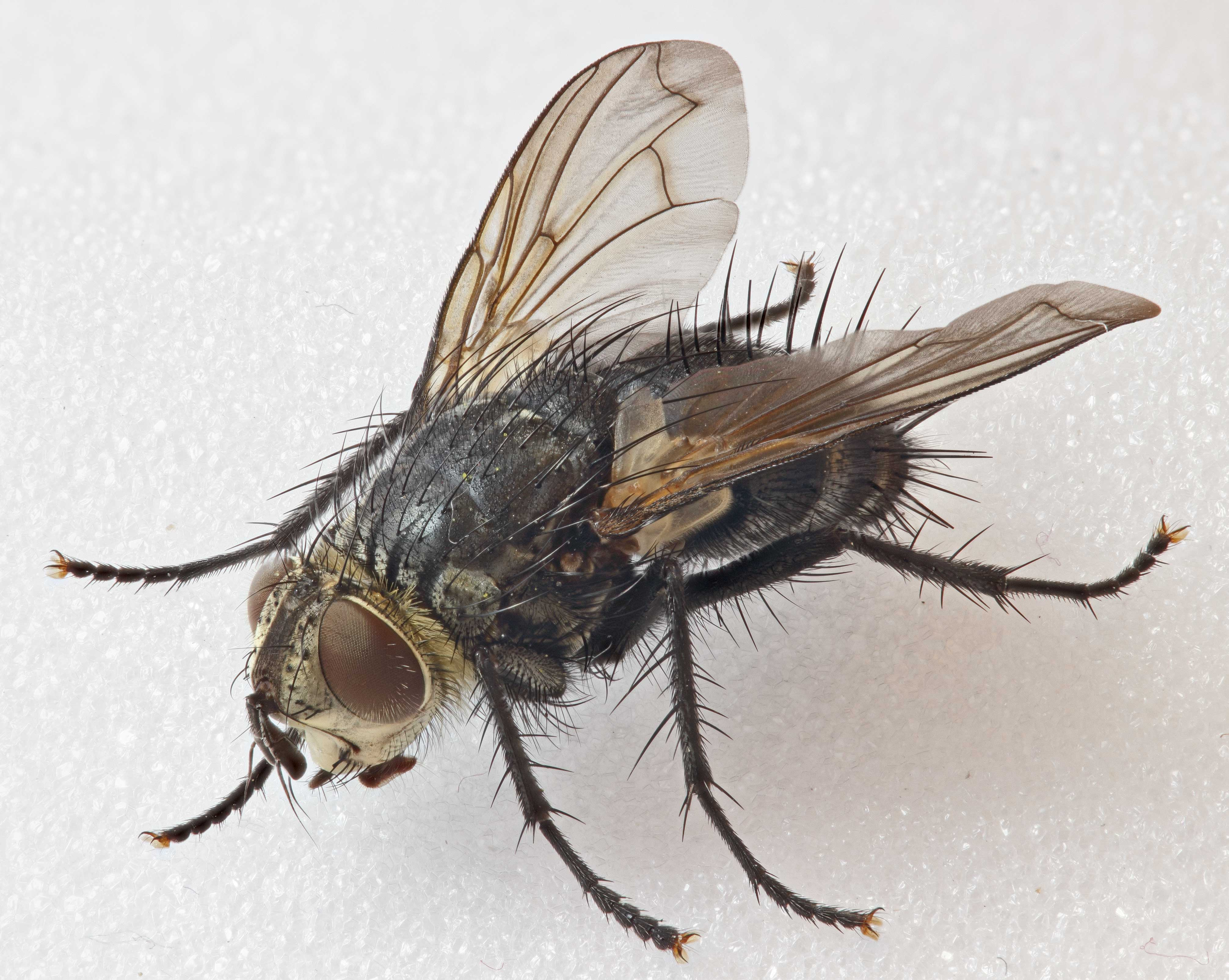

Scientific classification
- Kingdom: Animalia
- Phylum: Arthropoda
- Clade: Pancrustacea
- Class: Insecta
- Order: Diptera
- Family: Tachinidae
- Subfamily: Tachininae
- Tribe: Ernestiini
- Genus: Panzeria
- Species: P. anthophila

Binomial name
- Panzeria anthophila (Robineau-Desvoidy, 1830)

Synonyms
- Epigone anthophila Robineau-Desvoidy, 1830; Tachina crisia Walker, 1849

= Panzeria anthophila =

Species of fly

Panzeria anthophila is a European species of fly in the family Tachinidae.
