= Panzeria vivida =

Scientific classification
- Kingdom: Animalia
- Phylum: Arthropoda
- Clade: Pancrustacea
- Class: Insecta
- Order: Diptera
- Family: Tachinidae
- Subfamily: Tachininae
- Tribe: Ernestiini
- Genus: Panzeria
- Species: P. vivida

Binomial name
- Panzeria vivida (Zetterstedt, 1838)

Synonyms
- Tachina vivida Zetterstedt, 1838

Species of fly

Panzeria vivida is a European species of fly in the family Tachinidae.
