= Gymnocheta ruficornis =

Scientific classification
- Domain: Eukaryota
- Kingdom: Animalia
- Phylum: Arthropoda
- Class: Insecta
- Order: Diptera
- Family: Tachinidae
- Tribe: Ernestiini
- Genus: Gymnocheta
- Species: G. ruficornis

Binomial name
- Gymnocheta ruficornis Williston, 1886

Species of fly

Gymnocheta ruficornis is a species of bristle fly in the family Tachinidae. It is found in North America.
