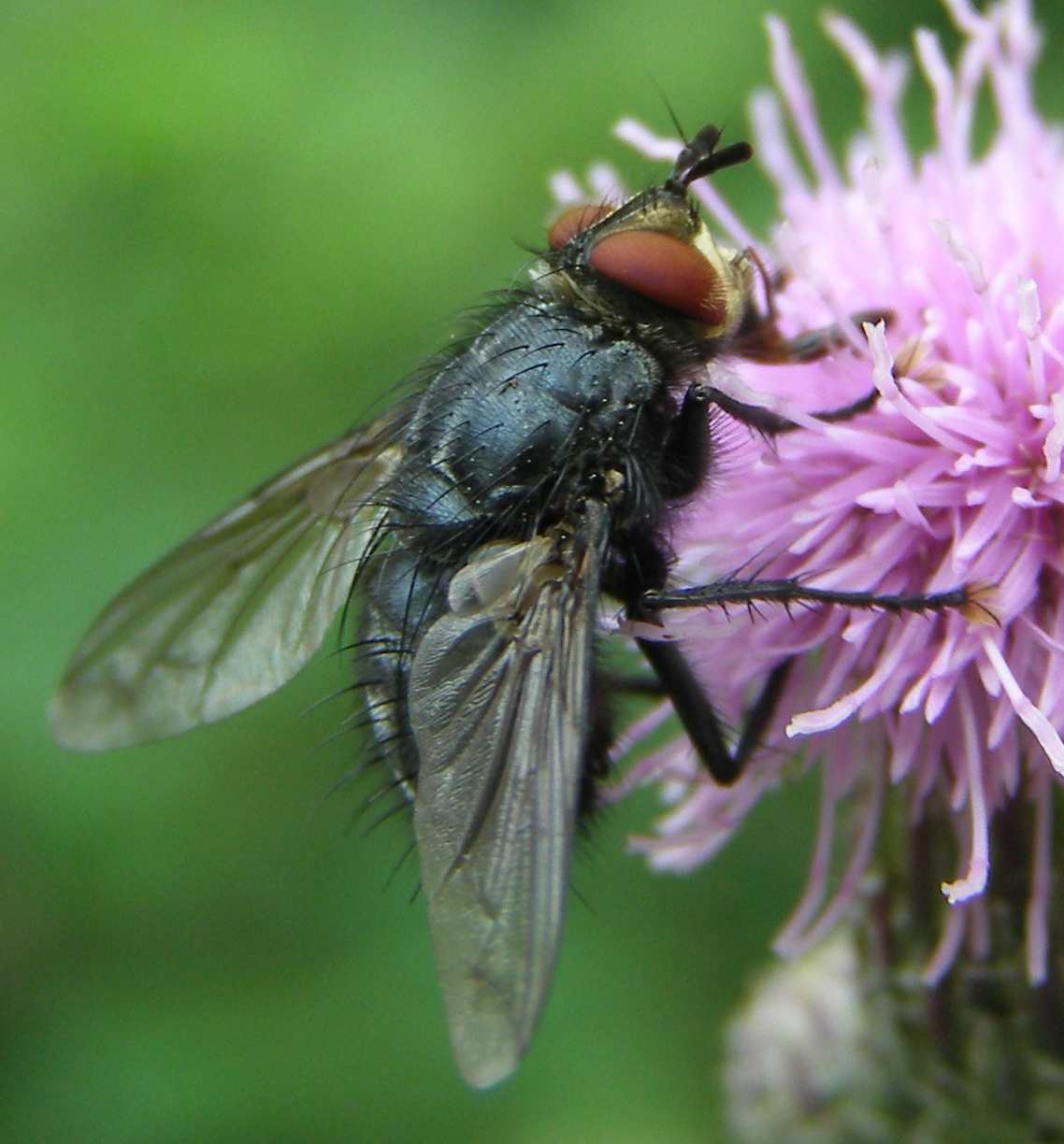

Scientific classification
- Kingdom: Animalia
- Phylum: Arthropoda
- Clade: Pancrustacea
- Class: Insecta
- Order: Diptera
- Family: Tachinidae
- Subfamily: Tachininae
- Tribe: Ernestiini
- Genus: Panzeria
- Species: P. connivens

Binomial name
- Panzeria connivens (Zetterstedt, 1844)

Synonyms
- Tachina connivens Zetterstedt, 1844

= Panzeria connivens =

Species of fly

Panzeria connivens is a European species of fly in the family Tachinidae.
