= Panzeria consobrina =

Scientific classification
- Kingdom: Animalia
- Phylum: Arthropoda
- Clade: Pancrustacea
- Class: Insecta
- Order: Diptera
- Family: Tachinidae
- Subfamily: Tachininae
- Tribe: Ernestiini
- Genus: Panzeria
- Species: P. consobrina

Binomial name
- Panzeria consobrina (Meigen, 1824)

Synonyms
- Tachina consobrina Meigen, 1824; Nemoraea setosa Macquart, 1848

Species of fly

Panzeria consobrina is a European species of fly in the family Tachinidae.
