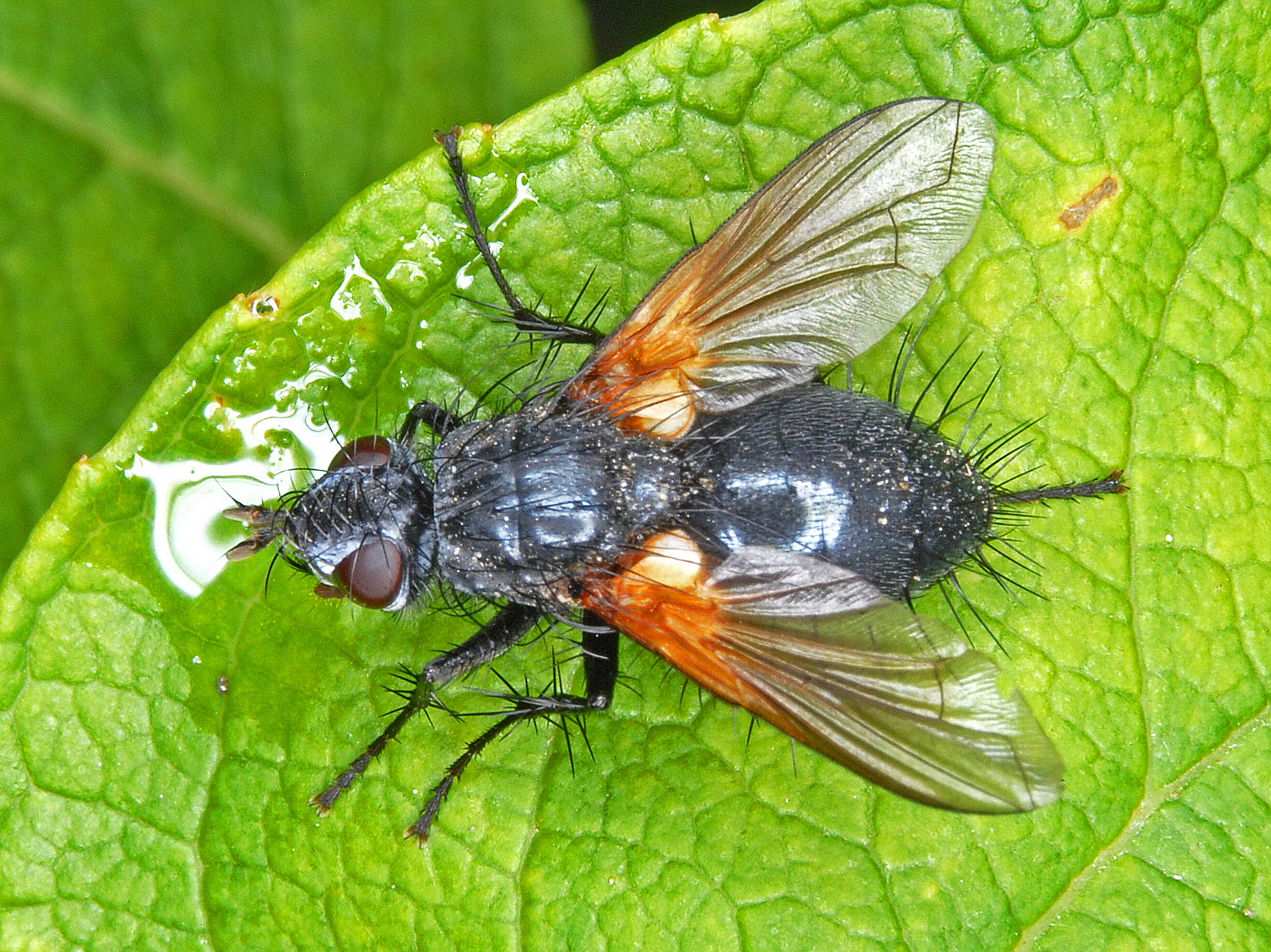
- Zophomyia temula

Scientific classification
- Kingdom: Animalia
- Phylum: Arthropoda
- Clade: Pancrustacea
- Class: Insecta
- Order: Diptera
- Family: Tachinidae
- Subfamily: Tachininae
- Tribe: Ernestiini
- Genus: Zophomyia
- Species: Z. temula

Binomial name
- Zophomyia temula (Scopoli, 1763)

Synonyms
- Musca temula Scopoli, 1763; Musca tremula Linnaeus, 1767; Musca obsidiana Harris, 1776; Tachina clymene Walker, 1849

= Zophomyia temula =

Species of fly

Zophomyia temula is a species of fly in the family Tachinidae.

== Distribution ==
This rather common species has a European distribution, and includes Transcaucasia, Kazakhstan and South Siberia.

== Habitat ==
These flies usually inhabit meadows, woodland, hedge rows and moist environments, and can often be found in the grass and on low-hanging leaves.

== Description ==
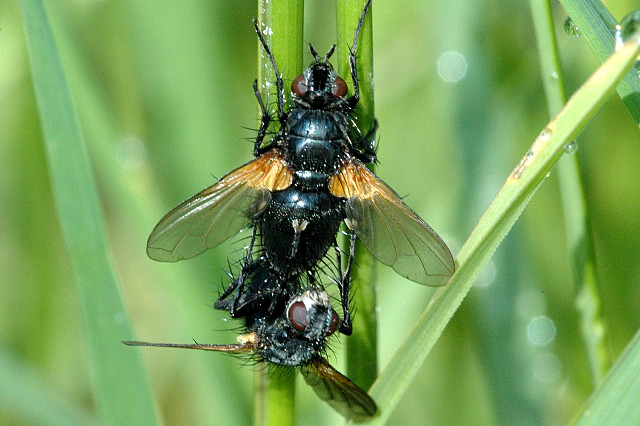
Mating couple

Zophomyia temula can reach a body length of approximately 8–10.5 millimetres (0.31–0.41 in), with a wingspan of 15–17 mm.

These flies are shiny and black on most of the body. This includes the thorax, abdomen, and setulae. This feature is unique in the family Tachinidae. The eyes are moderately sized and dark red in color. The body is quite slim and slightly elongated, as well as sparsely haired. The legs, like the body, are slender and long, covered in thick, dense hair. The wings are hyaline, with a warm yellow-orange base.

This species is rather similar to Mesembrina meridiana, belonging to the Muscidae family, characterized by a larger size and by the typical round shape of the true fly.

== Biology ==
Adults can be found from April to August, feeding on nectar and pollen of flowers, especially of Heracleum sphondylium. Larvae are parasitoids, living inside the host before emerging, feeding on the deceased body post-eclosion.
