= Loewia foeda =

Scientific classification
- Kingdom: Animalia
- Phylum: Arthropoda
- Clade: Pancrustacea
- Class: Insecta
- Order: Diptera
- Family: Tachinidae
- Subfamily: Tachininae
- Tribe: Ernestiini
- Genus: Loewia
- Species: L. foeda

Binomial name
- Loewia foeda (Meigen, 1824)

Synonyms
- Tachina foeda Meigen, 1824; Loewia brevifrons Meade, 1892; Loewia intermedia Brauer, 1898

Species of fly

Loewia foeda is a European and North America species of fly in the family Tachinidae. It was first found in North America in 1972. The species is a parasitoid of centipedes.

== Distribution ==
Canada, United States, British Isles, Czech Republic, Hungary, Lithuania, Poland, Romania, Slovakia, Ukraine, Denmark, Finland, Norway, Sweden, Italy, Slovenia, Austria, Belgium, France, Germany, Netherlands, Switzerland, Russia.
