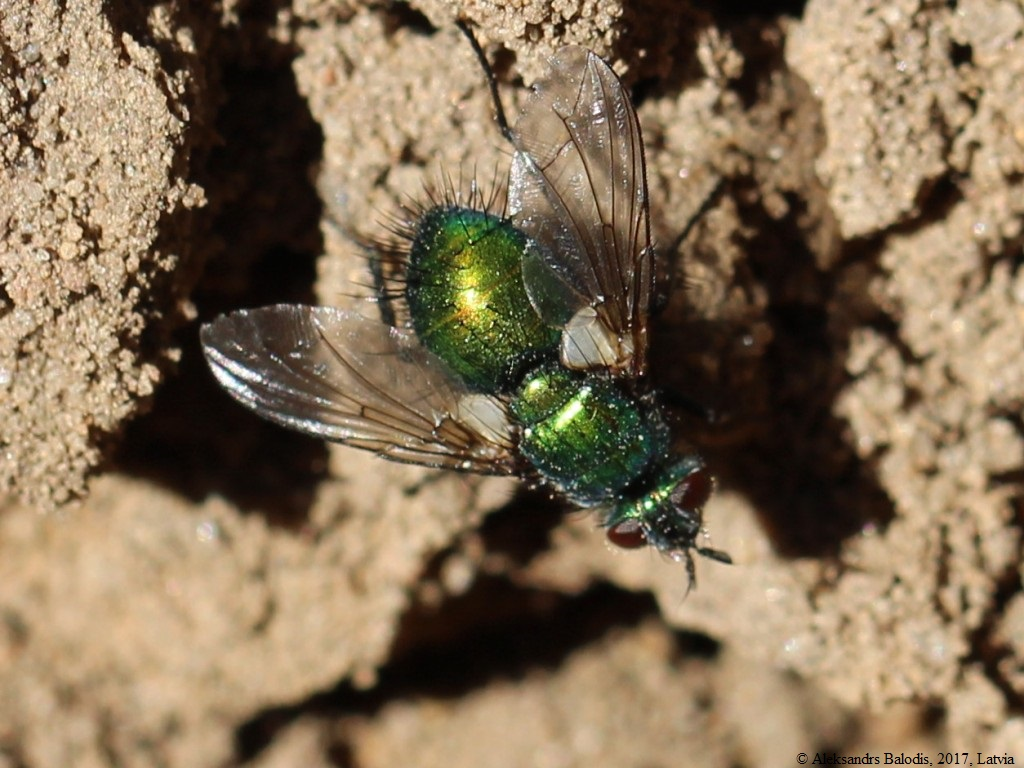

Scientific classification
- Kingdom: Animalia
- Phylum: Arthropoda
- Clade: Pancrustacea
- Class: Insecta
- Order: Diptera
- Family: Tachinidae
- Subfamily: Tachininae
- Tribe: Ernestiini
- Genus: Chrysosomopsis
- Species: C. aurata

Binomial name
- Chrysosomopsis aurata (Fallén, 1820)

Synonyms
- Tachina aurata Fallén, 1820

= Chrysosomopsis aurata =

Species of fly

Chrysosomopsis aurata is a European species of fly in the family Tachinidae.
