= Gymnoglossa transsylvanica =

Scientific classification
- Kingdom: Animalia
- Phylum: Arthropoda
- Class: Insecta
- Order: Diptera
- Family: Tachinidae
- Subfamily: Tachininae
- Tribe: Ernestiini
- Genus: Gymnoglossa
- Species: G. transsylvanica

Binomial name
- Gymnoglossa transsylvanica Mik, 1898

Species of fly

Gymnoglossa transsylvanica is a species of tachinid flies in the genus Gymnoglossa in the family Tachinidae.

== Distribution ==
Russia (Eastern Siberia, Western Siberia), Czech Republic, Romania, Ukraine, Bulgaria.
