= Loewia phaeoptera =

Scientific classification
- Kingdom: Animalia
- Phylum: Arthropoda
- Clade: Pancrustacea
- Class: Insecta
- Order: Diptera
- Family: Tachinidae
- Subfamily: Tachininae
- Tribe: Ernestiini
- Genus: Loewia
- Species: L. phaeoptera

Binomial name
- Loewia phaeoptera (Meigen, 1824)

Synonyms
- Tachina phaeoptera Meigen, 1824; Clista muscina Schiner, 1861

Species of fly

Loewia phaeoptera is a European and Asian species of fly in the family Tachinidae.

== Distribution ==
British Isles, Czech Republic, Hungary, Poland, Romania, Slovakia, Ukraine, Finland, Norway, Sweden, Bulgaria, Italy, Slovenia, Spain, Turkey, Austria, Belgium, France, Germany, Netherlands, Switzerland, Russia, Transcaucasia.
