= Bombyliomyia soror =

Scientific classification
- Kingdom: Animalia
- Phylum: Arthropoda
- Class: Insecta
- Order: Diptera
- Family: Tachinidae
- Subfamily: Tachininae
- Tribe: Ernestiini
- Genus: Bombyliomyia
- Species: B. soror

Binomial name
- Bombyliomyia soror (Williston, 1886)

Synonyms
- Hystricia soror Williston, 1886; Tachinalia hispida Curran, 1934

Species of fly

Bombyliomyia soror is a species of bristle fly in the family Tachinidae.

== Distribution ==
Canada, United States, Costa Rica, Guatemala, Mexico.
