= Loewia brevifrons =

Scientific classification
- Kingdom: Animalia
- Phylum: Arthropoda
- Clade: Pancrustacea
- Class: Insecta
- Order: Diptera
- Family: Tachinidae
- Subfamily: Tachininae
- Tribe: Ernestiini
- Genus: Loewia
- Species: L. brevifrons

Binomial name
- Loewia brevifrons (Rondani, 1856)

Synonyms
- Thrychogena brevifrons Rondani, 1856

Species of fly

Loewia brevifrons is a European and North America species of fly in the family Tachinidae.

== Distribution ==
Romania, Bosnia & Herzegovina, Bulgaria, Croatia, Greece, Italy, Turkey, Austria, France, Switzerland, Iran, Russia, Transcaucasia.
