= Panzeria intermedia =

Scientific classification
- Kingdom: Animalia
- Phylum: Arthropoda
- Clade: Pancrustacea
- Class: Insecta
- Order: Diptera
- Family: Tachinidae
- Subfamily: Tachininae
- Tribe: Ernestiini
- Genus: Panzeria
- Species: P. intermedia

Binomial name
- Panzeria intermedia (Zetterstedt, 1844)

Synonyms
- Tachina intermedia Zetterstedt, 1844; Tachina conjugata Zetterstedt, 1852

Species of fly

Panzeria intermedia is a European species of fly in the family Tachinidae.
