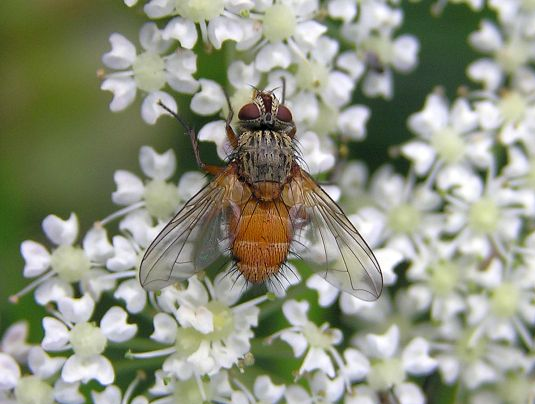
- Hyalurgus lucidus

Scientific classification
- Kingdom: Animalia
- Phylum: Arthropoda
- Clade: Pancrustacea
- Class: Insecta
- Order: Diptera
- Family: Tachinidae
- Subfamily: Tachininae
- Tribe: Ernestiini
- Genus: Hyalurgus
- Species: H. lucidus

Binomial name
- Hyalurgus lucidus (Meigen, 1824)

Synonyms
- Tachina lucida Meigen, 1824

= Hyalurgus lucidus =

Species of fly

Hyalurgus lucidus is a European species of fly in the family Tachinidae.

== Distribution ==
British Isles, Czech Republic, Estonia, Poland, Romania, Slovakia, Finland, Norway, Sweden, Andorra, Bulgaria, Italy, Spain, Austria, Belgium, France, Germany, Switzerland, Western Siberia, China.
