= Emporomyia =

Scientific classification
- Kingdom: Animalia
- Phylum: Arthropoda
- Class: Insecta
- Order: Diptera
- Family: Tachinidae
- Subfamily: Tachininae
- Tribe: Ernestiini
- Genus: Emporomyia; Brauer & von Berganstamm, 1891

Type species
- Emporomyia kaufmanni Brauer & von Berganstamm, 1891

Genus of flies

Emporomyia is a genus of flies in the family Tachinidae.

== Species ==
- Emporomyia caucasica Richter, 1981
- Emporomyia kaufmanni Brauer & von Berganstamm, 1891
