= Bracteola =

Scientific classification
- Kingdom: Animalia
- Phylum: Arthropoda
- Class: Insecta
- Order: Diptera
- Family: Tachinidae
- Subfamily: Tachininae
- Tribe: Ernestiini
- Genus: Bracteola; Richter, 1972

Type species
- Bracteola anthracina Richter, 1972

Genus of flies

Bracteola is a genus of flies in the family Tachinidae.

== Species ==
- Bracteola anthracina Richter, 1972

== Distribution ==
Turkmenistan, Iran, Western Russia, Azerbaijan.
