= Sonaca =

Scientific classification
- Kingdom: Animalia
- Phylum: Arthropoda
- Clade: Pancrustacea
- Class: Insecta
- Order: Diptera
- Family: Tachinidae
- Subfamily: Tachininae
- Tribe: Ernestiini
- Genus: Sonaca; Richter, 1981

Type species
- Sonaca araxicola Richter, 1981

Genus of flies

Sonaca is a genus of flies in the family Tachinidae.

== Species ==
- Sonaca moderata Herting, 1979

== Distribution ==
Turkey, Iran, Armenia.
