= Everestiomyia =

Scientific classification
- Kingdom: Animalia
- Phylum: Arthropoda
- Clade: Pancrustacea
- Class: Insecta
- Order: Diptera
- Family: Tachinidae
- Subfamily: Tachininae
- Tribe: Ernestiini
- Genus: Everestiomyia; Townsend, 1933

Type species
- Everestiomyia antennalis Townsend, 1933

Genus of flies

Everestiomyia is a genus of flies in the family Tachinidae.

== Species ==
- Everestiomyia antennalis Townsend, 1933
- Everestiomyia nudioculata Zhang, 2021
