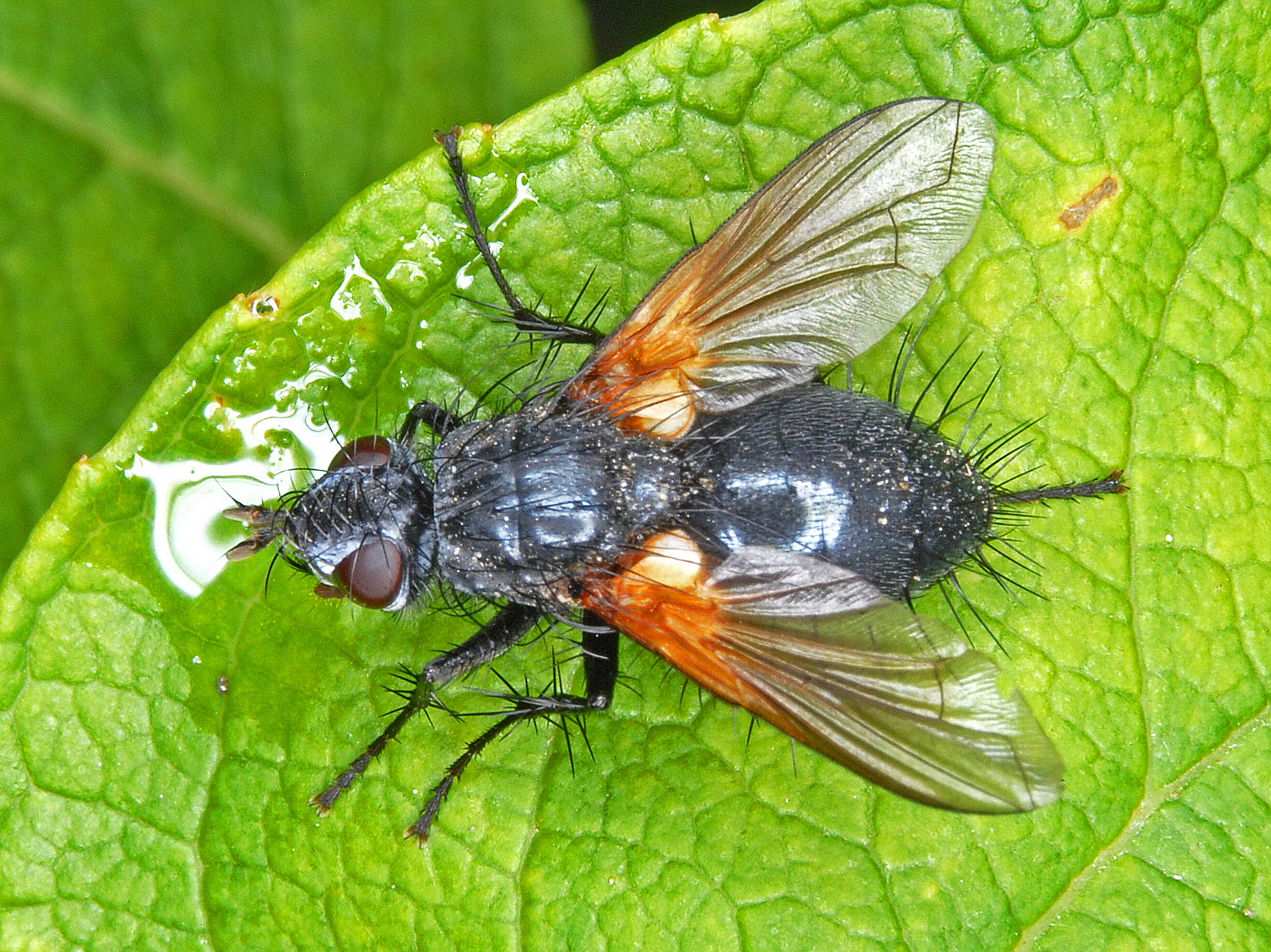
- Zophomyia temula

Scientific classification
- Kingdom: Animalia
- Phylum: Arthropoda
- Class: Insecta
- Order: Diptera
- Family: Tachinidae
- Subfamily: Tachininae
- Tribe: Ernestiini
- Genus: Zophomyia; Macquart, 1835

Type species
- Musca temula Scopoli, 1763

Synonyms
- Erebia Robineau-Desvoidy, 1830

= Zophomyia =

Genus of flies

Zophomyia is a genus of flies in the family Tachinidae.

== Species ==
- Zophomyia nitens Mesnil, 1963
- Zophomyia temula (Scopoli, 1763)
