= Phobetromyia =

Scientific classification
- Kingdom: Animalia
- Phylum: Arthropoda
- Class: Insecta
- Order: Diptera
- Family: Tachinidae
- Subfamily: Tachininae
- Tribe: Ernestiini
- Genus: Phobetromyia; Reinhard, 1964

Type species
- Phobetromyia dumalis Reinhard, 1964

Genus of flies

Phobetromyia is a genus of flies in the family Tachinidae.

== Species ==
- Phobetromyia dumalis Reinhard, 1964

== Distribution ==
Mexico.
