= Schizolinnaea =

Scientific classification
- Kingdom: Animalia
- Phylum: Arthropoda
- Class: Insecta
- Order: Diptera
- Family: Tachinidae
- Subfamily: Tachininae
- Tribe: Ernestiini
- Genus: Schizolinnaea; Emden, 1960

Type species
- Schizolinnaea mirabilis Emden, 1960

Genus of flies

Schizolinnaea is a genus of flies in the family Tachinidae.

== Species ==
- Schizolinnaea mirabilis Emden, 1960

== Distribution ==
Kenya, Malawi, Tanzania, Uganda, Zimbabwe.
