= Euhystricia =

Scientific classification
- Kingdom: Animalia
- Phylum: Arthropoda
- Clade: Pancrustacea
- Class: Insecta
- Order: Diptera
- Family: Tachinidae
- Subfamily: Tachininae
- Tribe: Ernestiini
- Genus: Euhystricia; Townsend, 1914

Type species
- Euhystricia nigra Townsend, 1914

Synonyms
- Euhystricia Townsend, 1914

Genus of flies

Euhystricia is a genus of flies in the family Tachinidae.

== Species ==
- Euhystricia nigra Townsend, 1914

== Distribution ==
Peru.
