= Macrochloria =

Scientific classification
- Kingdom: Animalia
- Phylum: Arthropoda
- Class: Insecta
- Order: Diptera
- Family: Tachinidae
- Subfamily: Tachininae
- Tribe: Ernestiini
- Genus: Macrochloria; Malloch, 1929

Type species
- Macrochloria calliphorosoma Malloch, 1929

Genus of flies

Macrochloria is a genus of flies in the family Tachinidae.

== Species ==
- Macrochloria nitidiventris (Macquart, 1851)
