= Lambrusca =

Scientific classification
- Kingdom: Animalia
- Phylum: Arthropoda
- Class: Insecta
- Order: Diptera
- Family: Tachinidae
- Subfamily: Tachininae
- Tribe: Ernestiini
- Genus: Lambrusca; Richter, 1998

Type species
- Lambrusca uralica Richter, 1998

Genus of flies

Lambrusca is a genus of flies in the family Tachinidae.

== Species ==
- Lambrusca uralica Richter, 1998
