= Janthinomyia =

Scientific classification
- Kingdom: Animalia
- Phylum: Arthropoda
- Class: Insecta
- Order: Diptera
- Family: Tachinidae
- Subfamily: Tachininae
- Tribe: Ernestiini
- Genus: Janthinomyia; Brauer & von Berganstamm, 1893

Type species
- Janthinomyia felderi Brauer & von Berganstamm, 1893

Synonyms
- Chrysocosmiomima Zimin, 1958; Scologaster Aldrich, 1926

Genus of flies

Janthinomyia is a genus of flies in the family Tachinidae.

== Species ==
- Janthinomyia elegans (Matsumura, 1905)
- Janthinomyia felderi Brauer & von Berganstamm, 1893
