= Plagiocoma =

Scientific classification
- Kingdom: Animalia
- Phylum: Arthropoda
- Class: Insecta
- Order: Diptera
- Family: Tachinidae
- Subfamily: Tachininae
- Tribe: Ernestiini
- Genus: Plagiocoma; Villeneuve, 1916

Type species
- Plagiocoma crassiseta Villeneuve, 1916

Genus of flies

Plagiocoma is a genus of flies in the family Tachinidae.

== Species ==
- Plagiocoma crassiseta Villeneuve, 1916

== Distribution ==
South Africa.
