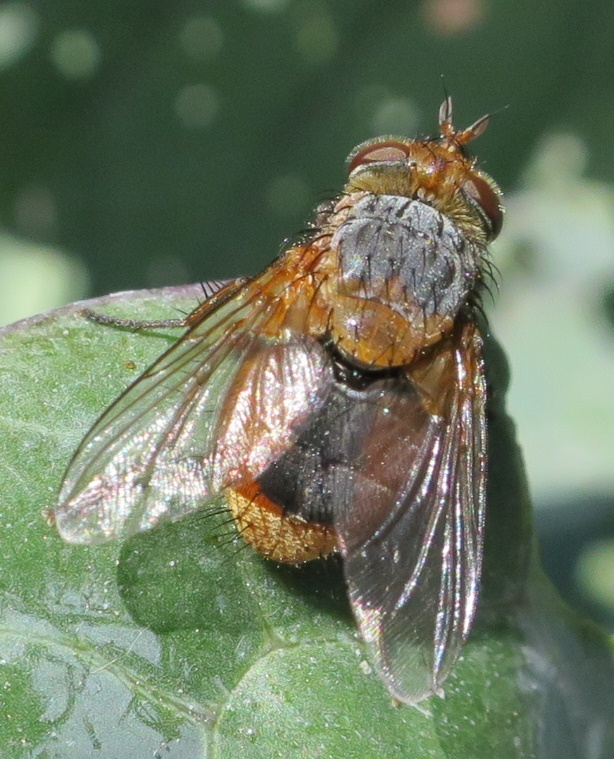
- Chaetophthalmus bicolor

Scientific classification
- Kingdom: Animalia
- Phylum: Arthropoda
- Class: Insecta
- Order: Diptera
- Family: Tachinidae
- Subfamily: Tachininae
- Tribe: Ernestiini
- Genus: Chaetophthalmus; Brauer & von Berganstamm, 1891

Type species
- Micropalpus brevigaster Macquart, 1846

Synonyms
- Apalpus Malloch, 1929; Ballardia Curran, 1927

= Chaetophthalmus =

Genus of flies

Chaetophthalmus is a genus of flies in the family Tachinidae.

== Species ==
- Chaetophthalmus alienus Cantrell, 1985
- Chaetophthalmus argentifrons Cantrell & Shima, 1991
- Chaetophthalmus aurifrons Cantrell & Shima, 1991
- Chaetophthalmus bicolor (Macquart, 1848)
- Chaetophthalmus bicoloratus Cantrell & Shima, 1991
- Chaetophthalmus brevigaster (Macquart, 1846)
- Chaetophthalmus collessi Cantrell, 1985
- Chaetophthalmus dorsalis (Malloch, 1929)
- Chaetophthalmus flavocaudus Cantrell, 1985
- Chaetophthalmus flavopilosus Cantrell, 1985
- Chaetophthalmus formosioides Cantrell, 1985
- Chaetophthalmus fullerae Cantrell, 1985
- Chaetophthalmus gressitti Cantrell & Shima, 1991
- Chaetophthalmus inconstans Cantrell & Shima, 1991
- Chaetophthalmus innotatus Cantrell, 1985
- Chaetophthalmus laticeps Cantrell & Shima, 1991
- Chaetophthalmus longimentum Cantrell, 1985
- Chaetophthalmus nitidus Cantrell & Shima, 1991
- Chaetophthalmus occlusus Cantrell, 1985
- Chaetophthalmus ruficeps (Macquart, 1847)
- Chaetophthalmus sedlacekorum Cantrell & Shima, 1991
- Chaetophthalmus setosus Cantrell, 1985
- Chaetophthalmus shinonagai Cantrell & Shima, 1991
- Chaetophthalmus taylori Cantrell & Shima, 1991
- Chaetophthalmus tonnoiri Cantrell, 1985
- Chaetophthalmus wau Cantrell & Shima, 1991
