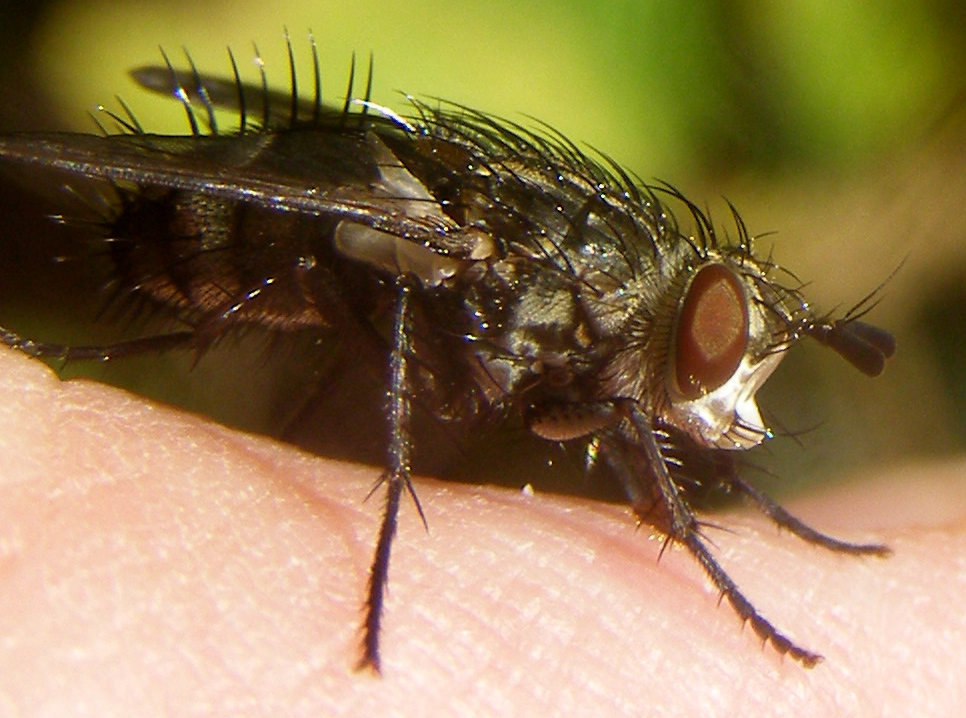

Scientific classification
- Kingdom: Animalia
- Phylum: Arthropoda
- Clade: Pancrustacea
- Class: Insecta
- Order: Diptera
- Family: Tachinidae
- Genus: Linnaemya
- Species: L. picta

Binomial name
- Linnaemya picta (Meigen, 1824)

Synonyms
- Tachina picta (Meigen, 1824)

= Linnaemya picta =

Species of fly

Linnaemya picta is a European species of fly in the family Tachinidae.
