= Gymnoglossa =

Scientific classification
- Kingdom: Animalia
- Phylum: Arthropoda
- Clade: Pancrustacea
- Class: Insecta
- Order: Diptera
- Family: Tachinidae
- Subfamily: Tachininae
- Tribe: Ernestiini
- Genus: Gymnoglossa; Mik, 1898

Type species
- Gymnoglossa transsylvanica Mik, 1898

Genus of flies

Gymnoglossa is a genus of flies in the family Tachinidae.

== Species ==
- Gymnoglossa munroi Curran, 1934 – South Africa.
- Gymnoglossa transsylvanica Mik, 1898 – Russia (Eastern Siberia, Western Siberia), Czech Republic, Romania, Ukraine, Bulgaria.
