= Corybantia =

Scientific classification
- Kingdom: Animalia
- Phylum: Arthropoda
- Class: Insecta
- Order: Diptera
- Family: Tachinidae
- Subfamily: Tachininae
- Tribe: Ernestiini
- Genus: Corybantia; Richter, 1986

Type species
- Corybantia flaviaristata Richter, 1986

Genus of flies

Corybantia is a genus of flies in the family Tachinidae.

== Species ==
- Corybantia flaviaristata Richter, 1986
