= Linnaemya tessellans =

Scientific classification
- Kingdom: Animalia
- Phylum: Arthropoda
- Clade: Pancrustacea
- Class: Insecta
- Order: Diptera
- Family: Tachinidae
- Genus: Linnaemya
- Species: L. tessellans

Binomial name
- Linnaemya tessellans (Robineau-Desvoidy, 1830)

Synonyms
- Bonellia tessellans Robineau-Desvoidy, 1830; Micropalpus pudica Rondani, 1859; Nemoraea quadraticornis Meade, 1894

Species of fly

Linnaemya tessellans is a European species of fly in the family Tachinidae.
