= Hineomyia =

Scientific classification
- Kingdom: Animalia
- Phylum: Arthropoda
- Clade: Pancrustacea
- Class: Insecta
- Order: Diptera
- Family: Tachinidae
- Subfamily: Tachininae
- Tribe: Ernestiini
- Genus: Hineomyia; Townsend, 1916

Type species
- Nemoraea setigera Coquillett, 1902

Synonyms
- Hinea Townsend, 1916

Genus of flies

Hineomyia is a genus of flies in the family, Tachinidae.

== Species ==
- Hineomyia setigera (Coquillett, 1902)

== Distribution ==
Canada, United States.
