= Munira (fly) =

Scientific classification
- Kingdom: Animalia
- Phylum: Arthropoda
- Class: Insecta
- Order: Diptera
- Family: Tachinidae
- Subfamily: Tachininae
- Tribe: Ernestiini
- Genus: Munira; Richter, 1974

Type species
- Munira bella Richter, 1974

Genus of flies

Munira is a genus of flies in the family Tachinidae.

== Species ==
- Munira bella Richter, 1974

== Distribution ==
Georgia
