= Tachinophasia =

Scientific classification
- Kingdom: Animalia
- Phylum: Arthropoda
- Class: Insecta
- Order: Diptera
- Family: Tachinidae
- Subfamily: Tachininae
- Tribe: Ernestiini
- Genus: Tachinophasia; Townsend, 1931

Type species
- Tachinophasia transita Townsend, 1931

Genus of flies

Tachinophasia is a genus of flies in the family Tachinidae.

== Species ==
- Tachinophasia transita Townsend, 1931

== Distribution ==
Brazil.
