= Loewia glutinosa =

Scientific classification
- Kingdom: Plantae
- Clade: Tracheophytes
- Clade: Angiosperms
- Clade: Eudicots
- Clade: Rosids
- Order: Malpighiales
- Family: Passifloraceae
- Genus: Loewia
- Species: L. glutinosa

Binomial name
- Loewia glutinosa Urb.
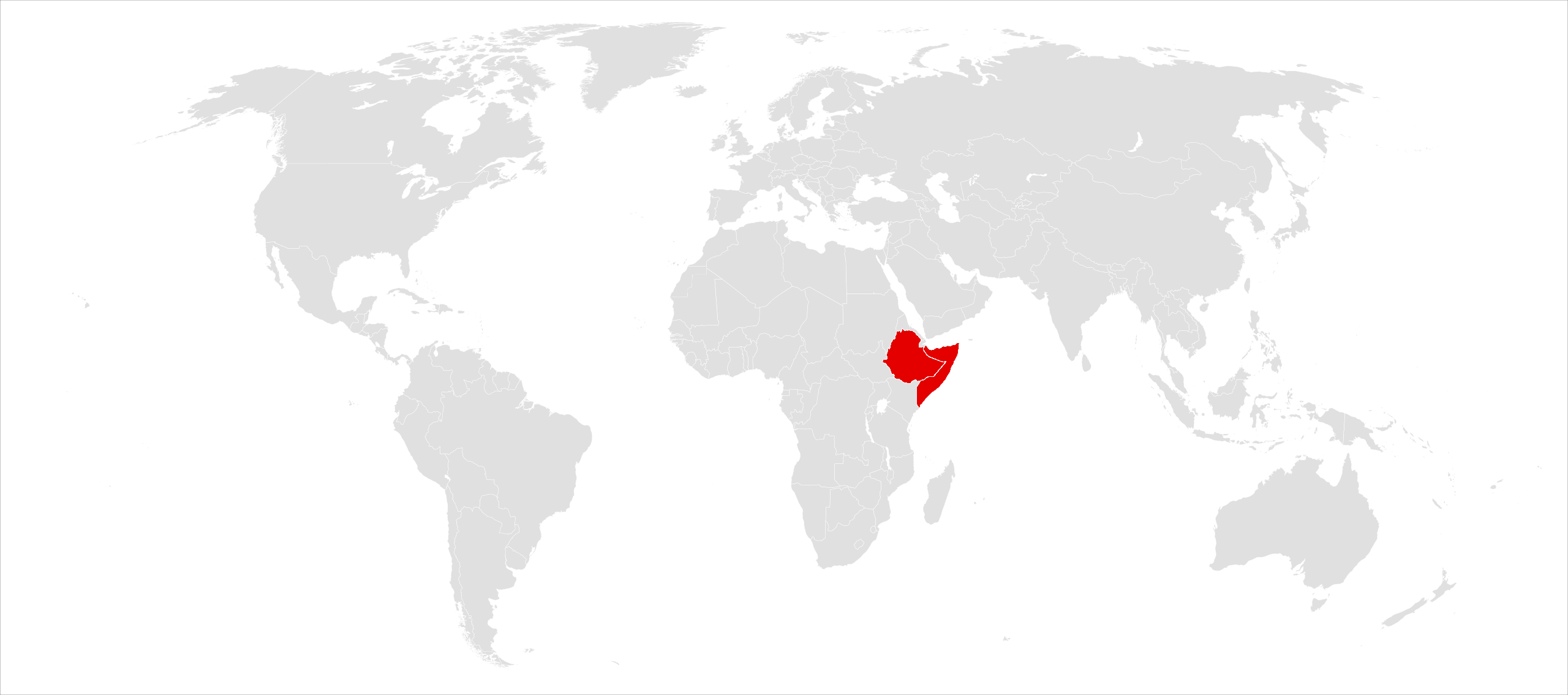

Synonyms
- Loewia glutinosa var. glabra Roti Mich. in Webbia; Loewia glutinosa var. microphylla Chiov. in Fl. Somala; Loewia microphylla (Chiov.) Roti Mich. in Webbia

Species of flowering plant

Loewia glutinosa is a species of shrub from East Kenya belonging to the family Passifloraceae. Ethiopia, and Somalia.

L. glutinosa can grow up to 3 meters and has orange flowers. Flowers can be distylous or homostylous. Leaf size and shape varies across regions. Colloquially it is called rumassan (Somali).
