= Eloceria =

Scientific classification
- Kingdom: Animalia
- Phylum: Arthropoda
- Clade: Pancrustacea
- Class: Insecta
- Order: Diptera
- Family: Tachinidae
- Subfamily: Tachininae
- Tribe: Ernestiini
- Genus: Eloceria; Robineau-Desvoidy, 1863

Synonyms
- Cerophora Robineau-Desvoidy, 1863; Helocera Mik, 1884; Stauferia Brauer & von Berganstamm, 1893

Genus of flies

Eloceria is a genus of flies in the family Tachinidae.

== Species ==
- Eloceria angustifrons (Mesnil, 1953)
- Eloceria delecta (Meigen, 1824)
- Eloceria discolor (Villeneuve, 1942)
- Eloceria grandis Mesnil, 1973
- Eloceria nigra (Coquillett, 1902)
- Eloceria ursina Richter & Tschorsnig, 2000
