= Neximyia =

Scientific classification
- Kingdom: Animalia
- Phylum: Arthropoda
- Class: Insecta
- Order: Diptera
- Family: Tachinidae
- Subfamily: Tachininae
- Tribe: Ernestiini
- Genus: Neximyia; Crosskey, 1967

Type species
- Neophasia picta Brauer & von Berganstamm, 1893

Synonyms
- Euphasia Townsend, 1908; Neophasia Brauer & von Berganstamm, 1893

Genus of flies

Neximyia is a genus of flies in the family Tachinidae.

== Species ==
- Neximyia picta (Brauer & von Berganstamm, 1893)
