= Marshallomyia =

Scientific classification
- Kingdom: Animalia
- Phylum: Arthropoda
- Class: Insecta
- Order: Diptera
- Family: Tachinidae
- Subfamily: Tachininae
- Tribe: Ernestiini
- Genus: Marshallomyia; Fennah in van Emden, 1960

Type species
- Marshallomyia natalensis Fennah in van Emden, 1960

Genus of flies

Marshallomyia is a genus of flies in the family Tachinidae.

== Species ==
- Marshallomyia natalensis Fennah in van Emden, 1960, 1960
