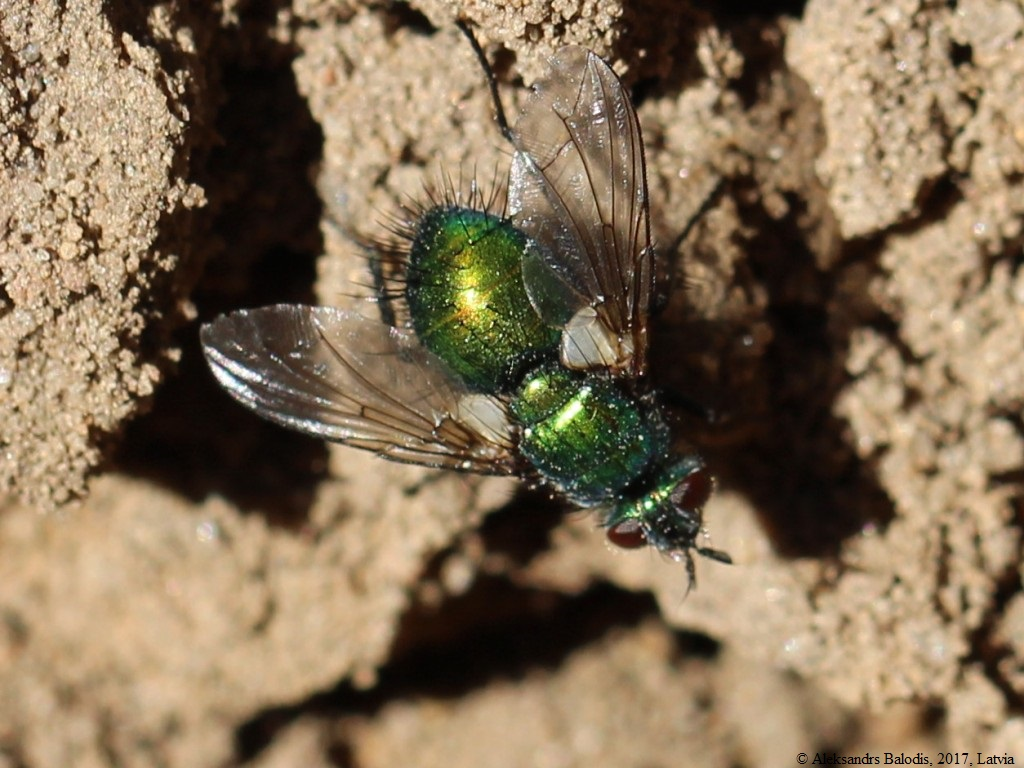
- Chrysosomopsis aurata

Scientific classification
- Kingdom: Animalia
- Phylum: Arthropoda
- Class: Insecta
- Order: Diptera
- Family: Tachinidae
- Subfamily: Tachininae
- Tribe: Ernestiini
- Genus: Chrysosomopsis; Townsend, 1916

Type species
- Tachina aurata Fallén, 1820

Synonyms
- Chrysomopsis Herting & Dely-Draskovits, 1993; Eucomus Aldrich, 1926

= Chrysosomopsis =

Genus of flies

Chrysosomopsis is a genus of flies in the family Tachinidae.

== Species ==
- Chrysosomopsis aurata (Fallén, 1820)
- Chrysosomopsis bidentata (Chao & Zhou, 1989)
- Chrysosomopsis euholoptica (Chao & Zhou, 1989)
- Chrysosomopsis helenae (Zimin, 1958)
- Chrysosomopsis ignorabilis (Zimin, 1958)
- Chrysosomopsis strictus (Aldrich, 1926)
- Chrysosomopsis macrocercus Zeegers, Ziegler & Tschorsnig, 2016
- Chrysosomopsis monoseta (Chao & Zhou, 1989)
- Chrysosomopsis ocelloseta (Chao & Zhou, 1989)
- Chrysosomopsis stricta (Aldrich, 1926)
- Chrysosomopsis vicina (Mesnil, 1953)
