= Chiricahuia =

Scientific classification
- Kingdom: Animalia
- Phylum: Arthropoda
- Clade: Pancrustacea
- Class: Insecta
- Order: Diptera
- Family: Tachinidae
- Subfamily: Tachininae
- Tribe: Ernestiini
- Genus: Chiricahuia; Townsend, 1918

Type species
- Chiricahuia cavicola Townsend, 1918

Genus of flies

Chiricahuia is a genus of flies in the family Tachinidae.

== Species ==
- Chiricahuia cavicola Townsend, 1918

== Distribution ==
United States.
