= Gastroptilops =

Scientific classification
- Kingdom: Animalia
- Phylum: Arthropoda
- Class: Insecta
- Order: Diptera
- Family: Tachinidae
- Subfamily: Tachininae
- Tribe: Ernestiini
- Genus: Gastroptilops; Mesnil, 1957

Type species
- Gastroptilops ater Mesnil, 1957

Genus of flies

Gastroptilops is a genus of flies in the family Tachinidae.

== Species ==
- Gastroptilops ater Mesnil, 1957

== Distribution ==
Japan, Russian Far East
