= Linnaemya comta =

Scientific classification
- Kingdom: Animalia
- Phylum: Arthropoda
- Clade: Pancrustacea
- Class: Insecta
- Order: Diptera
- Family: Tachinidae
- Genus: Linnaemya
- Species: L. comta

Binomial name
- Linnaemya comta (Fallén, 1810)

Synonyms
- Linnaemya analis Robineau-Desvoidy, 1830; Tachina compta (Meigen, 1824); Tachina fulgens (Meigen, 1824); Tachina comta (Fallén, 1810)

Species of insect

Linnaemya comta is a European species of fly in the family Tachinidae.
