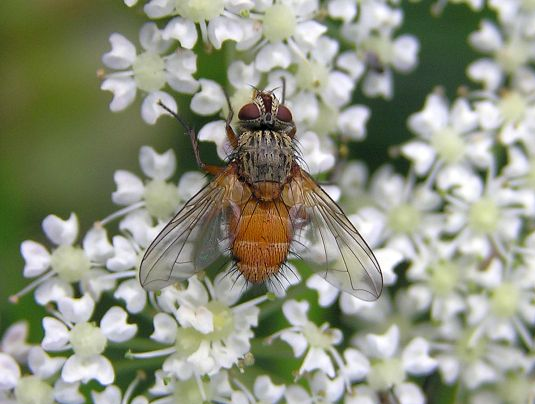
- Hyalurgus lucidus

Scientific classification
- Kingdom: Animalia
- Phylum: Arthropoda
- Class: Insecta
- Order: Diptera
- Family: Tachinidae
- Subfamily: Tachininae
- Tribe: Ernestiini
- Genus: Hyalurgus; Brauer & von Berganstamm, 1893

Type species
- Tachina crucigera Zetterstedt, 1838

Synonyms
- Microerigone Zimin, 1960; Parastauferia Pokorny, 1893; Xanthocera Townsend, 1915

= Hyalurgus =

Genus of flies

Hyalurgus is a genus of flies in the family Tachinidae.

== Species ==
- Hyalurgus abdominalis (Matsumura, 1911)
- Hyalurgus amnicola Richter, 1974
- Hyalurgus ater (Townsend, 1919)
- Hyalurgus atratus Mesnil, 1967
- Hyalurgus cinctus Villeneuve, 1937
- Hyalurgus clistoides (Townsend, 1915)
- Hyalurgus cruciger (Zetterstedt, 1838)
- Hyalurgus curvicercus Chao & Shi, 1980
- Hyalurgus flavipes Chao & Shi, 1980
- Hyalurgus latifrons Chao & Shi, 1980
- Hyalurgus longihirtus Chao & Shi, 1980
- Hyalurgus lucidus (Meigen, 1824)
- Hyalurgus minimus Mesnil, 1953
- Hyalurgus ningxiaensis Wang & Zhang, 2012
- Hyalurgus sima (Zimin, 1960)
- Hyalurgus tomostethi Cepelák, 1963
