= Linnaemya rossica =

Scientific classification
- Kingdom: Animalia
- Phylum: Arthropoda
- Clade: Pancrustacea
- Class: Insecta
- Order: Diptera
- Family: Tachinidae
- Genus: Linnaemya
- Species: L. rossica

Binomial name
- Linnaemya rossica Zimin, 1954

Species of fly

Linnaemya rossica is a European species of fly in the family Tachinidae.
