= Coloradomyia =

Scientific classification
- Kingdom: Animalia
- Phylum: Arthropoda
- Clade: Pancrustacea
- Class: Insecta
- Order: Diptera
- Family: Tachinidae
- Subfamily: Tachininae
- Tribe: Ernestiini
- Genus: Coloradomyia; Arnaud, 1963

Type species
- Coloradomyia eucosmaphaga Arnaud, 1963

Genus of flies

Coloradomyia is a genus of flies in the family Tachinidae.

== Species ==
- Coloradomyia eucosmaphaga Arnaud, 1963

== Distribution ==
Colorado
