= Lyphosia =

Scientific classification
- Kingdom: Animalia
- Phylum: Arthropoda
- Clade: Pancrustacea
- Class: Insecta
- Order: Diptera
- Family: Tachinidae
- Subfamily: Tachininae
- Tribe: Ernestiini
- Genus: Lyphosia; Mesnil, 1957

Type species
- Lyphosia barbata Mesnil, 1957

Genus of flies

Lyphosia is a genus of flies in the family Tachinidae.

== Species ==
- Lyphosia barbata (Mesnil, 1957)
