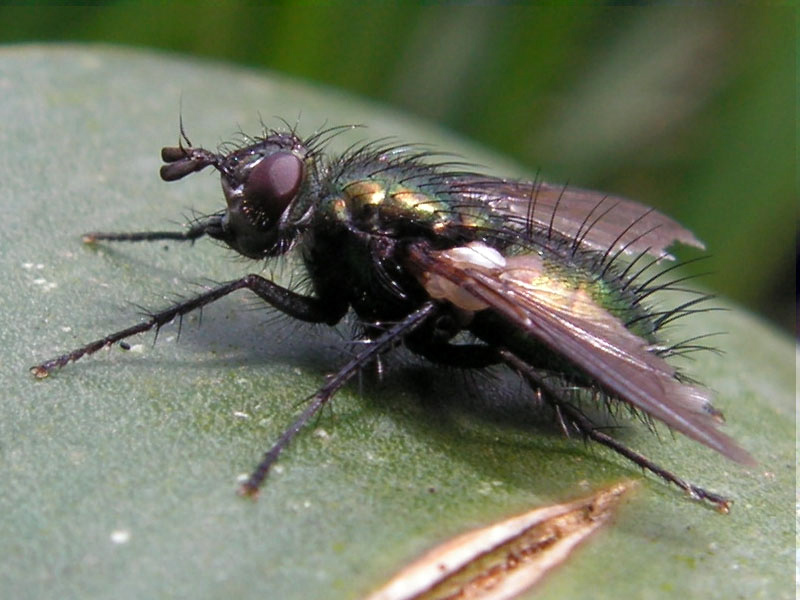
- Gymnocheta viridis

Scientific classification
- Kingdom: Animalia
- Phylum: Arthropoda
- Class: Insecta
- Order: Diptera
- Family: Tachinidae
- Subfamily: Tachininae
- Tribe: Ernestiini
- Genus: Gymnocheta; Robineau-Desvoidy, 1830

Type species
- Tachina viridis Fallén, 1810

Synonyms
- Chlorometaphyto Townsend, 1919; Gimnocheta Rondani, 1859; Gymnochaeta Macquart, 1835

= Gymnocheta =

Genus of flies

Gymnocheta is a genus of flies in the family Tachinidae.

== Species ==
- Gymnocheta flamma Zimin, 1958
- Gymnocheta frontalis Brooks, 1945
- Gymnocheta goniata Chao, 1979
- Gymnocheta lucida Zimin, 1958
- Gymnocheta magna Zimin, 1958
- G. mesnili Zimin, 1958
- Gymnocheta porphyrophora Zimin, 1958
- Gymnocheta ruficornis Williston, 1886
- Gymnocheta rufipalpis Brooks, 1945
- Gymnocheta viridis (Fallén, 1810)
- Gymnocheta vivida Williston, 1886
- Gymnocheta zhelochovtsevi Zimin, 1958
