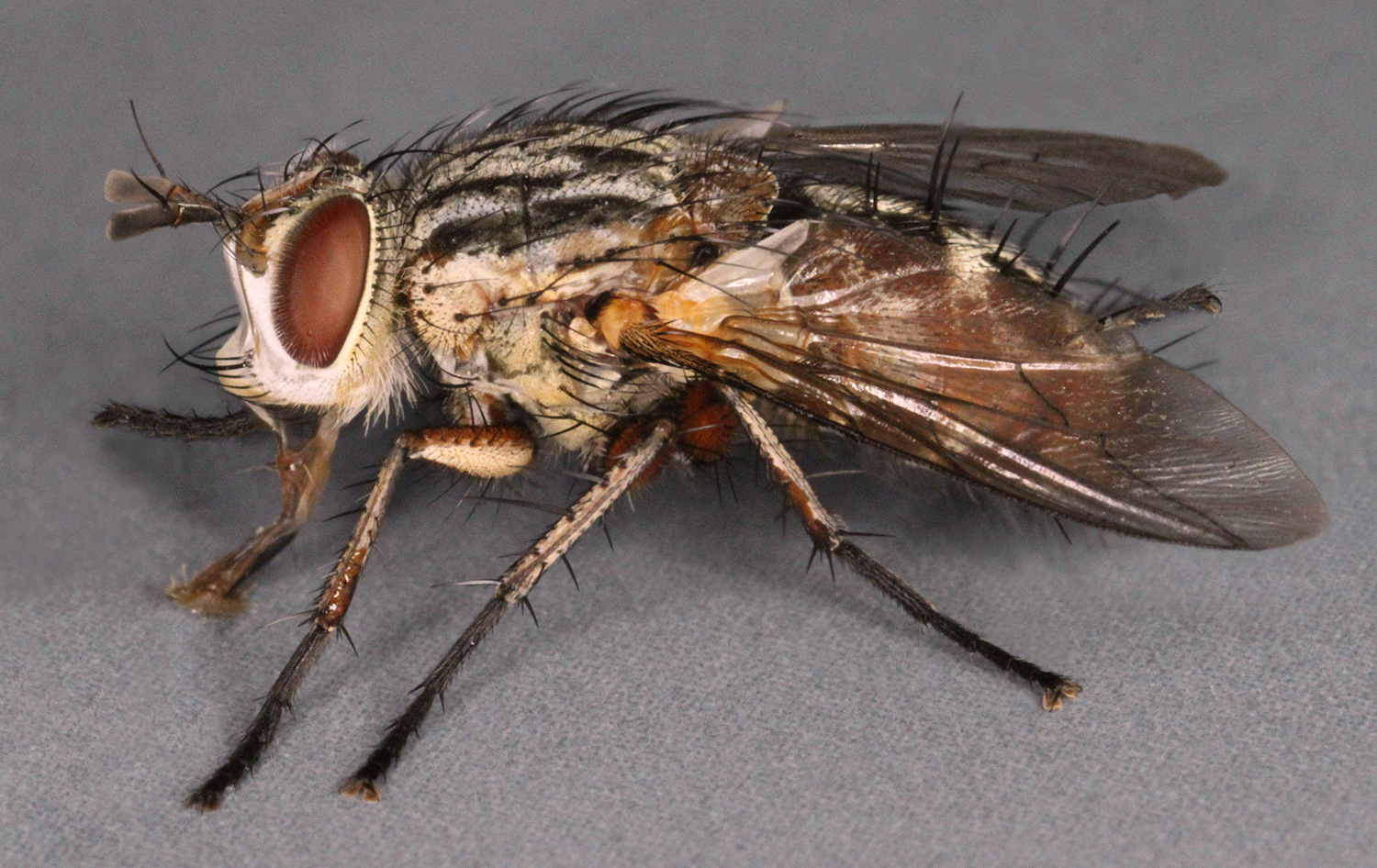
- Linnaemya vulpina

Scientific classification
- Kingdom: Animalia
- Phylum: Arthropoda
- Clade: Pancrustacea
- Class: Insecta
- Order: Diptera
- Family: Tachinidae
- Subfamily: Tachininae
- Tribe: Ernestiini
- Genus: Linnaemya; Robineau-Desvoidy, 1830

Type species
- Linnaemyia silvestris Robineau-Desvoidy, 1830

Synonyms
- Bonellimyia Townsend, 1919; Bonnetia Robineau-Desvoidy, 1830; Eugymnochaetopsis Townsend, 1927; Gymmantia Enderlein, 1937; Hecatoepalpus Townsend, 1933; Hemilinnaemyia Villeneuve, 1932; Leptoceromyia Zimin, 1963; Linnemya Macquart, 1835; Linnemyia Aldrich, 1905; Linnemyia Macquart, 1834; Marshamia Robineau-Desvoidy, 1830; Marshania Robineau-Desvoidy, 1863; Micropalpinus Enderlein, 1937; Micropalpis Macquart, 1834; Micropalpus Macquart, 1835; Nigrobonellia Brooks, 1944; Palpina Malloch, 1927; Tachinomima Brauer & von Berganstamm, 1891; Thompsonomyia Brooks, 1944; Xanthoerigone Townsend, 1927

= Linnaemya =

Genus of flies

Linnaemya is a genus of flies in the family Tachinidae.

== Species ==
Subgenus Homoeonychia Brauer & von Berganstamm, 1889

- Linnaemya amicorum Draber-Monko & Kolomiets, 1982
- Linnaemya bella Mesnil, 1970
- Linnaemya crosskeyi Shima, 1986
- Linnaemya frater (Rondani, 1859)
- Linnaemya lithosiophaga (Rondani, 1859)
- Linnaemya montshadskyi Zimin, 1954
- Linnaemya speciosissima Mesnil, 1957
- Linnaemya steini Jacentkovský, 1944

Subgenus Linnaemya Robineau-Desvoidy, 1830

- Linnaemya ambigua Shima, 1986
- Linnaemya assimilis (Macquart, 1847)
- Linnaemya atrisetosa Shima, 1986
- Linnaemya atriventris (Malloch, 1935)
- Linnaemya aurantiaca Mesnil, 1952
- Linnaemya basilewskyi Mesnil, 1955
- Linnaemya burmana Shima, 1986
- Linnaemya comta (Fallén, 1810)
- Linnaemya felis Mesnil, 1957
- Linnaemya flavifemur Zhang, 2020
- Linnaemya hirtipennis Shima, 1986
- Linnaemya hirtiradia Chao & Shi, 1980
- Linnaemya hybrida Zimin, 1965
- Linnaemya impudica (Rondani, 1859)
- Linnaemya kanoi Shima, 1986
- Linnaemya lateralis (Townsend, 1927)
- Linnaemya latigena Kugler, 1977
- Linnaemya laxiceps (Villeneuve, 1916)
- Linnaemya lindneri Mesnil, 1968
- Linnaemya linguicerca Chao & Shi, 1980
- Linnaemya medogensis Chao & Zhou, 1998
- Linnaemya melancholica Mesnil, 1957
- Linnaemya neavi Curran, 1934
- Linnaemya nonappendix Chao & Shi, 1980
- Linnaemya ochracea Herting, 1973
- Linnaemya oralis (Townsend, 1927)
- Linnaemya pallidohirta Chao, 1962
- Linnaemya paralongipalpis Chao, 1962
- Linnaemya pellex Mesnil, 1957
- Linnaemya persimilis Shima, 1986
- Linnaemya ruficaudata Shima, 1986
- Linnaemya ruficornis Chao, 1962
- Linnaemya scutellaris (Malloch, 1927)
- Linnaemya siamensis Shima, 1986
- Linnaemya soror Zimin, 1954
- Linnaemya sulensis Shima, 1986
- Linnaemya takanoi Mesnil, 1957
- Linnaemya tessellans (Robineau-Desvoidy, 1830)
- Linnaemya tuberculata Shima, 1986
- Linnaemya vulpina (Fallén, 1810)
- Linnaemya vulpinoides (Baranov, 1932)
- Linnaemya zhangi Zhao & Zhou, 1993
- Linnaemya zimini Chao, 1962

Subgenus Ophina Robineau-Desvoidy, 1863

- Linnaemya altaica Richter, 1979
- Linnaemya amicula Mesnil, 1957
- Linnaemya anthracina Thompson, 1911
- Linnaemya claripalla Chao & Shi, 1980
- Linnaemya dumonti Mesnil, 1971
- Linnaemya fissiglobula Pandellé, 1895
- Linnaemya glauca (Brooks, 1944)
- Linnaemya haemorrhoidalis (Fallén, 1810)
- Linnaemya helvetica Herting, 1963
- Linnaemya jaroschevskyi Zimin, 1954
- Linnaemya majae Zimin, 1954
- Linnaemya media Zimin, 1954
- Linnaemya microchaeta Zimin, 1954
- Linnaemya microchaetopsis Shima, 1986
- Linnaemya nigrescens Curran, 1925
- Linnaemya nigrifacies Enderlein, 1934
- Linnaemya obscurellina Mesnil, 1971
- Linnaemya olsufjevi Zimin, 1954
- Linnaemya omega Zimin, 1954
- Linnaemya pallidula Zimin, 1954
- Linnaemya pentheri (Bischof, 1906)
- Linnaemya perinealis Pandellé, 1895
- Linnaemya petiolata Kugler, 1971
- Linnaemya picta (Meigen, 1824)
- Linnaemya pictipennis Curran, 1927
- Linnaemya polychaeta Zimin, 1963
- Linnaemya pullior Shima, 1986
- Linnaemya rossica Zimin, 1954
- Linnaemya saga Richter, 1974
- Linnaemya setifrons Zimin, 1954
- Linnaemya smirnovi Zimin, 1954
- Linnaemya tessellata (Brooks, 1944)
- Linnaemya tuberocerca Chao & Shi, 1980
- Linnaemya varia Curran, 1925
- Linnaemya zachvatkini Zimin, 1954

Unplaced to subgenus

- Linnaemya aculeata Curran, 1934
- Linnaemya agilis Curran, 1934
- Linnaemya alboscutellata (Speiser, 1910)
- Linnaemya alopecina (Speiser, 1910)
- Linnaemya andrewesi Emden, 1960
- Linnaemya angulicornis (Speiser, 1910)
- Linnaemya angustiforceps Emden, 1960
- Linnaemya argyrozona Emden, 1960
- Linnaemya bequaerti Curran, 1934
- Linnaemya bergstroemi Pohjoismäki & Haarto, 2015
- Linnaemya boxi Emden, 1960
- Linnaemya brincki Verbeke, 1970
- Linnaemya braunsi (Villeneuve, 1930)
- Linnaemya brunneoguttata Emden, 1960
- Linnaemya caffra (Villeneuve, 1916)
- Linnaemya chorleyi Emden, 1960
- Linnaemya ciliata Mesnil, 1952
- Linnaemya concavicornis (Macquart, 1851)
- Linnaemya conducens Villeneuve, 1941
- Linnaemya consobrina Villeneuve, 1941
- Linnaemya eburneola Villeneuve, 1935
- Linnaemya elgonica Emden, 1960
- Linnaemya ethelia Curran, 1934
- Linnaemya flavimedia Chao & Yuan, 1996
- Linnaemya flavitarsis Emden, 1960
- Linnaemya fumipennis Emden, 1960
- Linnaemya geniseta Emden, 1960
- Linnaemya gowdeyi Curran, 1934
- Linnaemya gracilipalpis Emden, 1960
- Linnaemya hirtifrons Mesnil, 1952
- Linnaemya ingrami Curran, 1934
- Linnaemya jocosa (Karsch, 1886)
- Linnaemya keiseri Mesnil, 1977
- Linnaemya kuankuoshuiensis Zhou, Wei & Luo, 2012
- Linnaemya leucaspis Emden, 1960
- Linnaemya longirostris (Macquart, 1844)
- Linnaemya luckmani Curran, 1934
- Linnaemya luculenta Mesnil, 1977
- Linnaemya maculipes (Villeneuve, 1920)
- Linnaemya masiceroides Villeneuve, 1935
- Linnaemya metocha Cantrell, 1985
- Linnaemya multisetosa (Villeneuve, 1936)
- Linnaemya nigribarba Mesnil, 1977
- Linnaemya nigricornis Chao, 1979
- Linnaemya nigritarsis Emden, 1960
- Linnaemya nigrohirta (Malloch, 1935)
- Linnaemya pallida (Jaennicke, 1867)
- Linnaemya parcesetosa (Villeneuve, 1916)
- Linnaemya pilitarsis (Villeneuve, 1913)
- Linnaemya prohecate (Speiser, 1910)
- Linnaemya propleuralis Emden, 1960
- Linnaemya pulchella Villeneuve, 1934
- Linnaemya rhodesiana Villeneuve, 1941
- Linnaemya rohdendorfi Chao, 1962
- Linnaemya rudebecki Verbeke, 1970
- Linnaemya sarcophagoides Cantrell, 1985
- Linnaemya setinervis Mesnil, 1952
- Linnaemya setulosa Cantrell, 1985
- Linnaemya somerenana Emden, 1960
- Linnaemya sororcula Villeneuve, 1941
- Linnaemya speculifera (Walker, 1849)
- Linnaemya stackelbergi Zimin, 1954
- Linnaemya strigipes Curran, 1934
- Linnaemya sulphurea (Villeneuve, 1935)
- Linnaemya succineiventris Emden, 1960
- Linnaemya timida Richter, 1993
- Linnaemya torensis Curran, 1934
- Linnaemya turbida (Brauer & von Berganstamm, 1893)
- Linnaemya variegata (Wiedemann, 1824)
- Linnaemya victoria Curran, 1934
- Linnaemya vittiventris Emden, 1960
