= Brachelia =

Scientific classification
- Kingdom: Animalia
- Phylum: Arthropoda
- Class: Insecta
- Order: Diptera
- Family: Tachinidae
- Subfamily: Tachininae
- Tribe: Ernestiini
- Genus: Brachelia; Robineau-Desvoidy, 1830

Type species
- Brachelia westermanni Robineau-Desvoidy, 1830

Synonyms
- Pseudolowia Brauer & von Berganstamm, 1889

Genus of flies

Brachelia is a genus of flies in the family Tachinidae.

== Species ==
- Brachelia leocrates (Walker, 1849)
- Brachelia minor Mesnil, 1968
- Brachelia westermanni Robineau-Desvoidy, 1830
