= Erebiomima =

Scientific classification
- Kingdom: Animalia
- Phylum: Arthropoda
- Class: Insecta
- Order: Diptera
- Family: Tachinidae
- Subfamily: Tachininae
- Tribe: Ernestiini
- Genus: Erebiomima; Mesnil, 1953

Type species
- Erebiomima luteisquama Mesnil, 1953

Genus of flies

Erebiomima is a genus of flies in the family Tachinidae.

== Species ==
- Erebiomima hertingi Kugler, 1968
- Erebiomima luteisquama Mesnil, 1953
