= Synactia =

Scientific classification
- Kingdom: Animalia
- Phylum: Arthropoda
- Class: Insecta
- Order: Diptera
- Family: Tachinidae
- Subfamily: Tachininae
- Tribe: Ernestiini
- Genus: Synactia; Villeneuve, 1916

Type species
- Bonannia foliacea Pandellé, 1895

Genus of flies

Synactia is a genus of flies in the family Tachinidae.

== Species ==
- Synactia carbonata Mesnil, 1963
- Synactia parvula (Rondani, 1861)
