= Bracheliopsis =

Scientific classification
- Kingdom: Animalia
- Phylum: Arthropoda
- Clade: Pancrustacea
- Class: Insecta
- Order: Diptera
- Family: Tachinidae
- Subfamily: Tachininae
- Tribe: Ernestiini
- Genus: Bracheliopsis; Emden, 1960

Type species
- Bracheliopsis geniseta Emden, 1960

Genus of flies

Bracheliopsis is a genus of flies in the family Tachinidae.

== Species ==
- Bracheliopsis geniseta Emden, 1960

== Distribution ==
Kenya
