= Loewia tanaensis =

Scientific classification
- Kingdom: Plantae
- Clade: Tracheophytes
- Clade: Angiosperms
- Clade: Eudicots
- Clade: Rosids
- Order: Malpighiales
- Family: Passifloraceae
- Genus: Loewia
- Species: L. tanaensis

Binomial name
- Loewia tanaensis Urb.
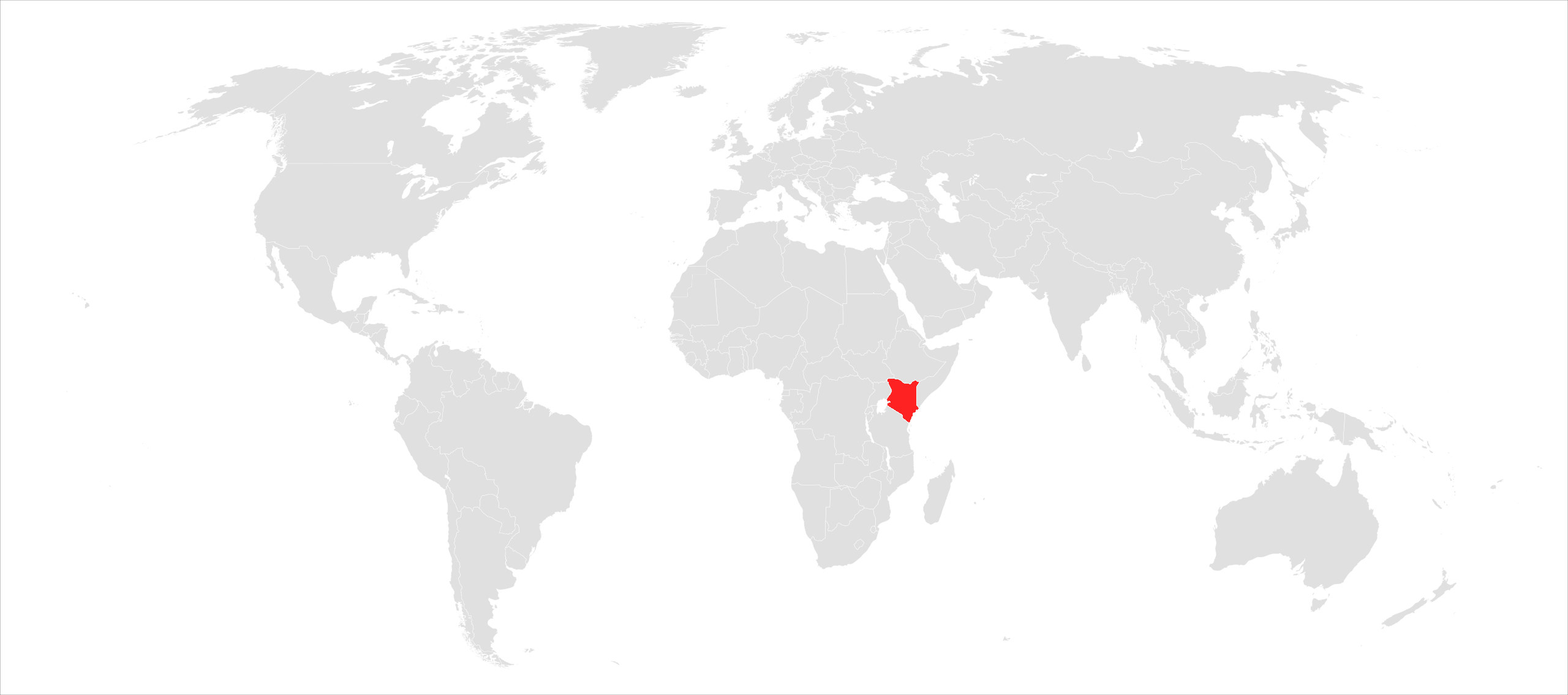

Species of flowering plant

Loewia tanaensis is a subshrub with yellow/orange flowers. It is native to the dry tropics of Kenya. It is believed to be distylous.
