= Melanophrys =

Scientific classification
- Kingdom: Animalia
- Phylum: Arthropoda
- Class: Insecta
- Order: Diptera
- Family: Tachinidae
- Subfamily: Tachininae
- Tribe: Ernestiini
- Genus: Melanophrys; Williston, 1886

Type species
- Melanophrys flavipennis Williston, 1886

Synonyms
- Atropharista Townsend, 1892

Genus of flies

Melanophrys is a genus of flies in the family Tachinidae.

== Species ==
- Melanophrys flavipennis Williston, 1886
- Melanophrys insolita (Walker, 1853)
