= Mehmetia =

Scientific classification
- Kingdom: Animalia
- Phylum: Arthropoda
- Class: Insecta
- Order: Diptera
- Family: Tachinidae
- Subfamily: Tachininae
- Tribe: Ernestiini
- Genus: Mehmetia; Özdikmen, 2007

Type species
- Mehmetia retrorsa Townsend, 1931

Synonyms
- Rhamphopteryx Townsend, 1931

Genus of flies

Mehmetia is a genus of flies in the family Tachinidae.

== Species ==
- Mehmetia retrorsa (Townsend, 1931)
