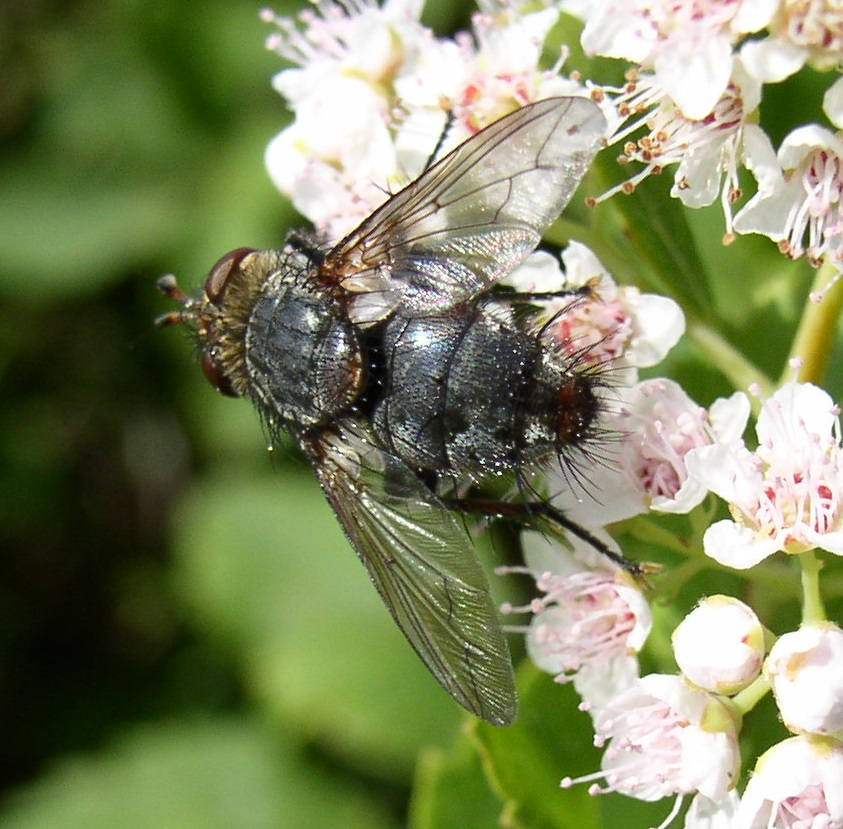
- Panzeria sp. on meadowsweet

Scientific classification
- Kingdom: Animalia
- Phylum: Arthropoda
- Clade: Pancrustacea
- Class: Insecta
- Order: Diptera
- Family: Tachinidae
- Subfamily: Tachininae
- Tribe: Ernestiini
- Genus: Panzeria; Robineau-Desvoidy, 1830

Type species
- Panzeria lateralis Robineau-Desvoidy, 1830

Synonyms
- Appendicia Stein, 1924; Ernestia Robineau-Desvoidy, 1830; Erigone Robineau-Desvoidy, 1830; Fausta Robineau-Desvoidy, 1830; Melinocera Townsend, 1915; Meriania Robineau-Desvoidy, 1830; Eurithia Robineau-Desvoidy, 1844; Echinosoma Girschner, 1881; Eurythia Brauer & von Bergenstamm, 1889; Metaphyto Coquillett, 1897; Moriania Robineau-Desvoidy, 1845; Okanagania Townsend, 1915; Platychira Rondani, 1856; Platychyra Rondani, 1859; Varichaeta Speiser, 1903; Promericia Brooks, 1943; Pseudomeriania Brooks, 1943

= Panzeria =

Genus of flies

Panzeria is a genus of flies in the family Tachinidae.

== Species ==
- Panzeria agathe (Zimin, 1957)
- Panzeria alberta (Curran, 1924)
- Panzeria aldrichi (Townsend, 1892)
- Panzeria ampelus (Walker, 1849)
- Panzeria anthophila (Robineau-Desvoidy, 1830)
- Panzeria appendicula (Zimin, 1957)
- Panzeria arcuata (Tothill, 1921)
- Panzeria argentifera (Meigen, 1824)
- Panzeria argyrocephala (Villeneuve, 1912)
- Panzeria armeniaca (Richter, 1972)
- Panzeria atra (Brauer, 1898)
- Panzeria atriventris Shima, 2020
- Panzeria beybienkoi (Zimin, 1960)
- Panzeria bicarina (Tothill, 1921)
- Panzeria bisetosa Shima, 2020
- Panzeria bisetosa Shima, 2020
- Panzeria breviunguis (Chao & Shi, 1981)
- Panzeria caesia (Fallén, 1810)
- Panzeria campestris (Curran, 1924)
- Panzeria castellana (Strobl, 1906)
- Panzeria chaetopyga (Zimin, 1957)
- Panzeria chalybaea (Coquillett, 1902)
- Panzeria cobala (Reinhard, 1953)
- Panzeria connivens (Zetterstedt, 1844)
- Panzeria consobrina (Meigen, 1824)
- Panzeria cristata (Villeneuve, 1920)
- Panzeria degenera (Walker, 1849)
- Panzeria excellens (Zimin, 1957)
- Panzeria fasciventris (Curran, 1924)
- Panzeria fissicarina (Tothill, 1921)
- Panzeria flavicornis Brauer, 1898
- Panzeria flavovillosa (Zimin, 1960)
- Panzeria frontalis (Tothill, 1921)
- Panzeria fucosa (Mesnil, 1975)
- Panzeria fulgida (Zimin, 1957)
- Panzeria gemina (Mesnil, 1972)
- Panzeria genalis (Coquillett, 1897)
- Panzeria globiventris (Chao & Shi, 1981)
- Panzeria hamilla (Reinhard, 1953)
- Panzeria heilongjiana (Chao & Shi, 1981)
- Panzeria hirta (Townsend, 1915)
- Panzeria hystrix (Zimin, 1957)
- Panzeria incisa (Tothill, 1921)
- Panzeria incongruens Herting, 1975
- Panzeria indica Lahiri, 2003
- Panzeria indigens (Pandellé, 1896)
- Panzeria intermedia (Zetterstedt, 1844)
- Panzeria inusta (Mesnil, 1957)
- Panzeria japonica Shima, 2020
- Panzeria johnsoni (Tothill, 1921)
- Panzeria juncta (Zimin, 1957)
- Panzeria laevigata (Meigen, 1838)
- Panzeria latipennis (Zhang & Fu, 2011)
- Panzeria linguacercus Zeegers, 2017
- Panzeria longicarina (Tothill, 1921)
- Panzeria longiventris (Kugler, 1971)
- Panzeria manitoba (Brooks, 1943)
- Panzeria melanopyga (Zimin, 1960)
- Panzeria meridionalis Shima, 2020
- Panzeria mesnili (Zimin, 1957)
- Panzeria mimetes (Zimin, 1960)
- Panzeria minor Gimmerthal, 1847
- Panzeria mira (Zimin, 1957)
- Panzeria nemorum (Meigen, 1824)
- Panzeria nigripennis (Chao & Shi, 1981)
- Panzeria nigritibia (Chao & Zhou, 1996)
- Panzeria nigrocornea (Tothill, 1921)
- Panzeria nigronitida (Chao & Shi, 1981)
- Panzeria nigropalpis (Tothill, 1921)
- Panzeria occidentalis (Brooks, 1943)
- Panzeria parcepilosa (Zimin, 1957)
- Panzeria pilosigena (Zimin, 1957)
- Panzeria platycarina (Tothill, 1921)
- Panzeria puparum (Fabricius, 1794)
- Panzeria rudis (Fallén, 1810)
- Panzeria ruficauda (Brauer, 1898)
- Panzeria rufitibialis (Shima, 2020)
- Panzeria separata (Zimin, 1960)
- Panzeria setifrons (Brooks, 1943)
- Panzeria shanxiensis Liu, Chao & Li, 1999
- Panzeria sulciforceps (Zimin, 1960)
- Panzeria sulcocarina (Tothill, 1921)
- Panzeria suspecta (Pandellé, 1896)
- Panzeria tadzhica (Zimin, 1957)
- Panzeria tadzhicorum (Zimin, 1960)
- Panzeria triangularis (Curran, 1924)
- Panzeria trichocalyptera (Chao & Shi, 1981)
- Panzeria truncata (Zetterstedt, 1838)
- Panzeria tuberculata (Chao & Shi, 1981)
- Panzeria vagans (Meigen, 1824)
- Panzeria vivida (Zetterstedt, 1838)
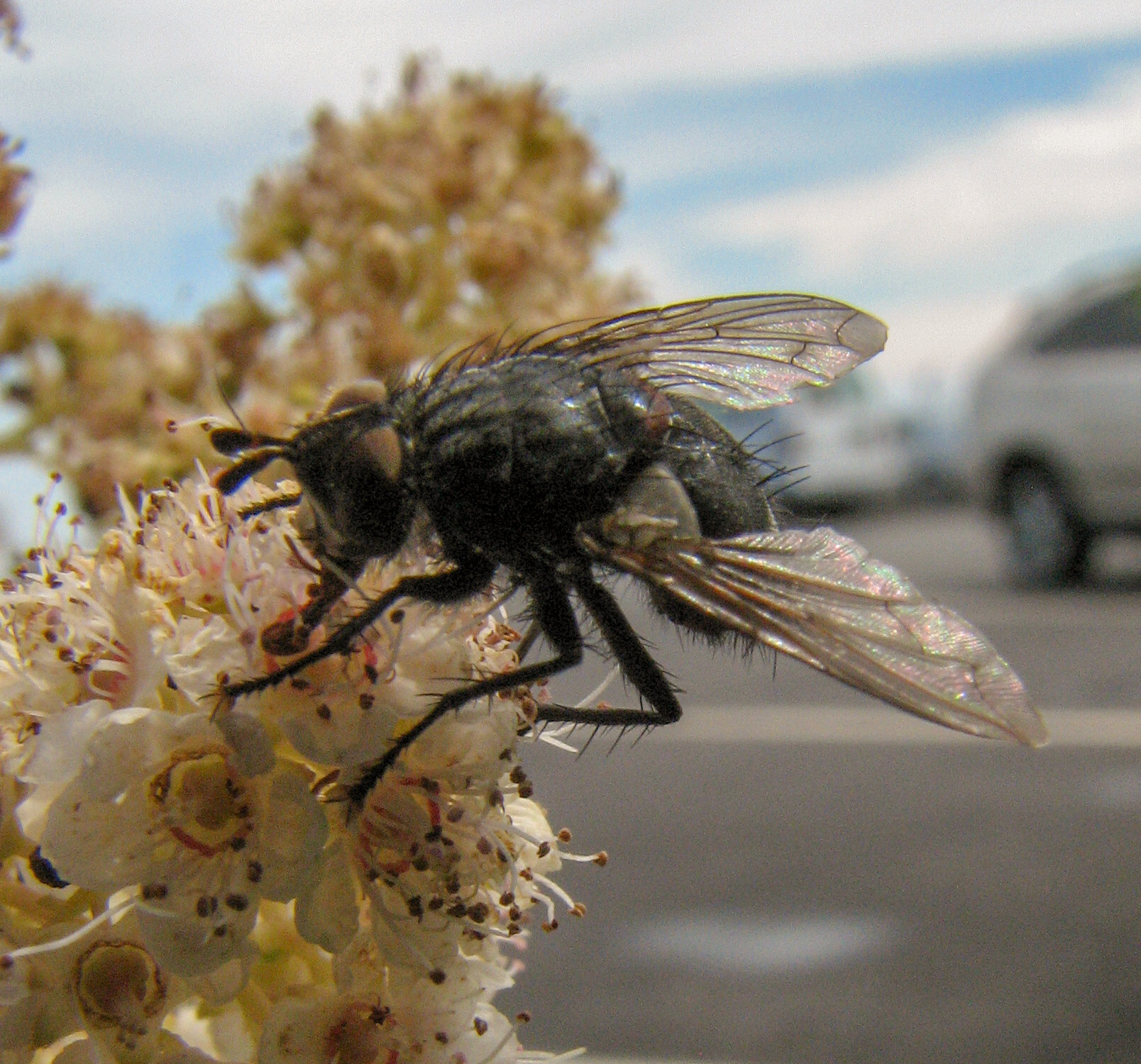
Panzeria sp. on meadowsweet
