= Microcerophina =

Scientific classification
- Kingdom: Animalia
- Phylum: Arthropoda
- Class: Insecta
- Order: Diptera
- Family: Tachinidae
- Subfamily: Tachininae
- Tribe: Ernestiini
- Genus: Microcerophina; Kugler, 1977

Type species
- Microcerophina planifacies Kugler, 1977

Genus of flies

Microcerophina is a genus of flies in the family Tachinidae.

== Species ==
- Microcerophina planifacies Kugler, 1977

== Distribution ==
Iran, Israel.
