= Chlorotachina =

Scientific classification
- Kingdom: Animalia
- Phylum: Arthropoda
- Class: Insecta
- Order: Diptera
- Family: Tachinidae
- Subfamily: Tachininae
- Tribe: Ernestiini
- Genus: Chlorotachina; Townsend, 1915

Type species
- Chrysosoma flaviceps Macquart, 1851

Synonyms
- Chlorodexia Townsend, 1916

Genus of flies

Chlorotachina is a genus of flies in the family Tachinidae.

== Species ==
- Chlorotachina flaviceps (Macquart, 1851)
- Chlorotachina froggattii (Townsend, 1916)
- Chlorotachina nigrocaerulea Malloch, 1929
