= Flavicorniculum =

Scientific classification
- Kingdom: Animalia
- Phylum: Arthropoda
- Class: Insecta
- Order: Diptera
- Family: Tachinidae
- Subfamily: Tachininae
- Tribe: Ernestiini
- Genus: Flavicorniculum; Chao & Shi, 1981

Type species
- Flavicorniculum hamiforceps Chao & Shi, 1981

Genus of flies

Flavicorniculum is a genus of flies in the family Tachinidae.

== Species ==
- Flavicorniculum forficalum Chao & Shi, 1981
- Flavicorniculum hamiforceps Chao & Shi, 1981
- Flavicorniculum multisetosum Chao & Shi, 1981
- Flavicorniculum planiforceps Chao & Shi, 1981
