= Symmorphomyia =

Scientific classification
- Kingdom: Animalia
- Phylum: Arthropoda
- Class: Insecta
- Order: Diptera
- Family: Tachinidae
- Subfamily: Tachininae
- Tribe: Ernestiini
- Genus: Symmorphomyia; Mesnil & Shima, 1988

Type species
- Symmorphomyia katayamai Mesnil & Shima, 1977

Genus of flies

Symmorphomyia is a genus of flies in the family Tachinidae.

== Species ==
- Symmorphomyia katayamai Mesnil & Shima, 1977

== Distribution ==
Japan, Russian Far East.
