= Bombyliomyia =

Scientific classification
- Kingdom: Animalia
- Phylum: Arthropoda
- Clade: Pancrustacea
- Class: Insecta
- Order: Diptera
- Family: Tachinidae
- Subfamily: Tachininae
- Tribe: Ernestiini
- Genus: Bombyliomyia; Brauer & von Berganstamm, 1889

Type species
- Hystricia flavipalpis Macquart, 1846

Synonyms
- Eublepharipeza Townsend, 1914; Tachinalia Curran, 1934

Genus of flies

An above view of a Bombyliomyia

Bombyliomyia is a genus of flies in the family Tachinidae.

== Species ==
- Bombyliomyia albiceps (Wulp, 1888)
- Bombyliomyia concolor Engel, 1920
- Bombyliomyia cuestae Engel, 1920
- Bombyliomyia flavipalpis (Macquart, 1846)
- Bombyliomyia flavitarsis (Macquart, 1846)
- Bombyliomyia gabana (Townsend, 1914)
- Bombyliomyia nigra (Townsend, 1914)
- Bombyliomyia patula (Walker, 1849)
- Bombyliomyia purpurea Thompson, 1963
- Bombyliomyia soror (Williston, 1886)
