= Montuosa =

Scientific classification
- Kingdom: Animalia
- Phylum: Arthropoda
- Class: Insecta
- Order: Diptera
- Family: Tachinidae
- Subfamily: Tachininae
- Tribe: Ernestiini
- Genus: Montuosa; Chao & Zhou, 1996

Type species
- Montuosa caura Chao & Zhou, 1996

Genus of flies

Montuosa is a genus of flies in the family Tachinidae.

== Species ==
- Montuosa caura Chao & Zhou, 1996
