= Gymnocheta magna =

Scientific classification
- Kingdom: Animalia
- Phylum: Arthropoda
- Clade: Pancrustacea
- Class: Insecta
- Order: Diptera
- Family: Tachinidae
- Genus: Gymnocheta
- Species: G. magna

Binomial name
- Gymnocheta magna Zimin, 1958

Species of fly

Gymnocheta magna is a metallic green tachinid fly.

== Distribution ==
Finland, Germany, Russia, Sweden, Switzerland, Netherlands, Ukraine.
