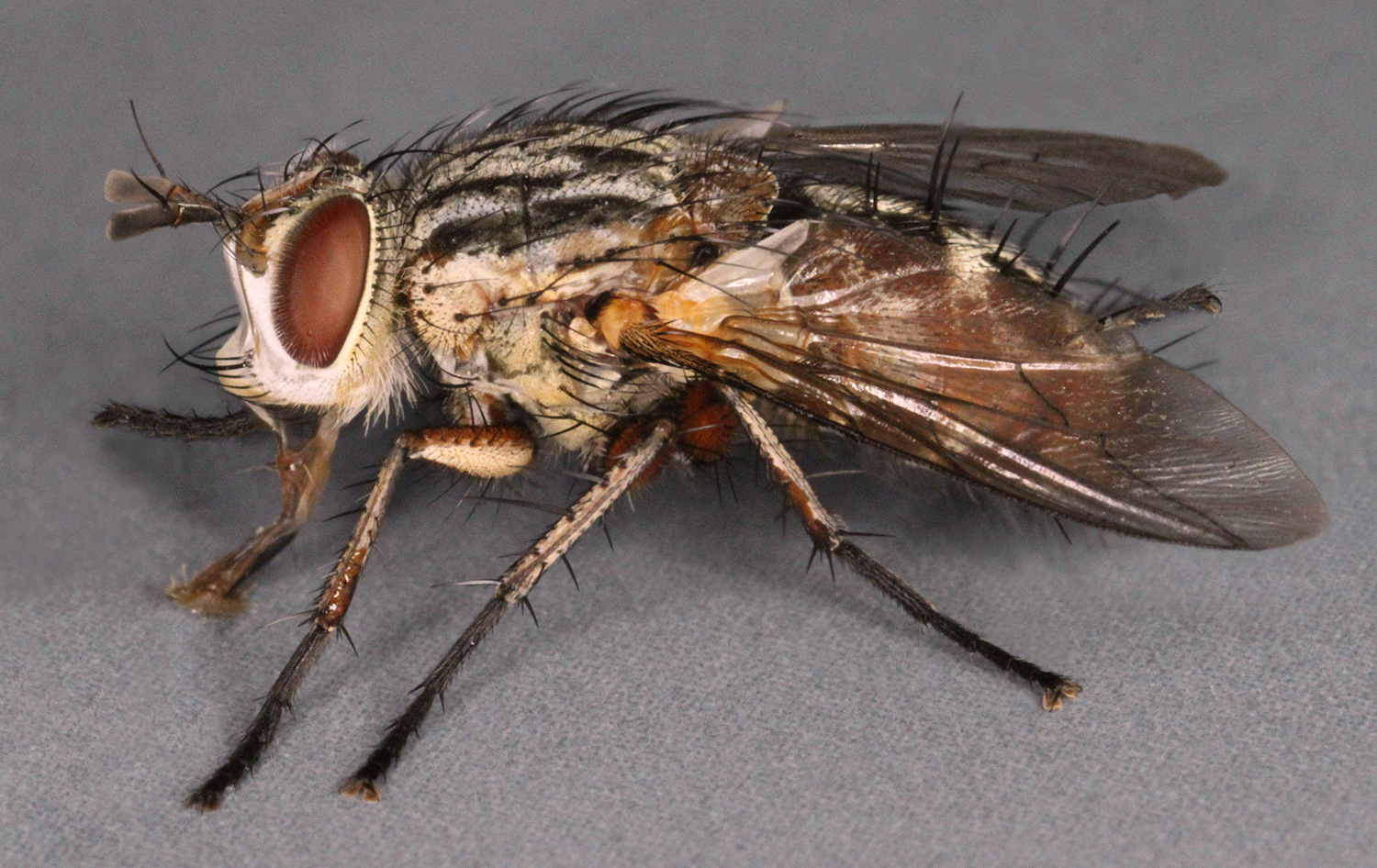

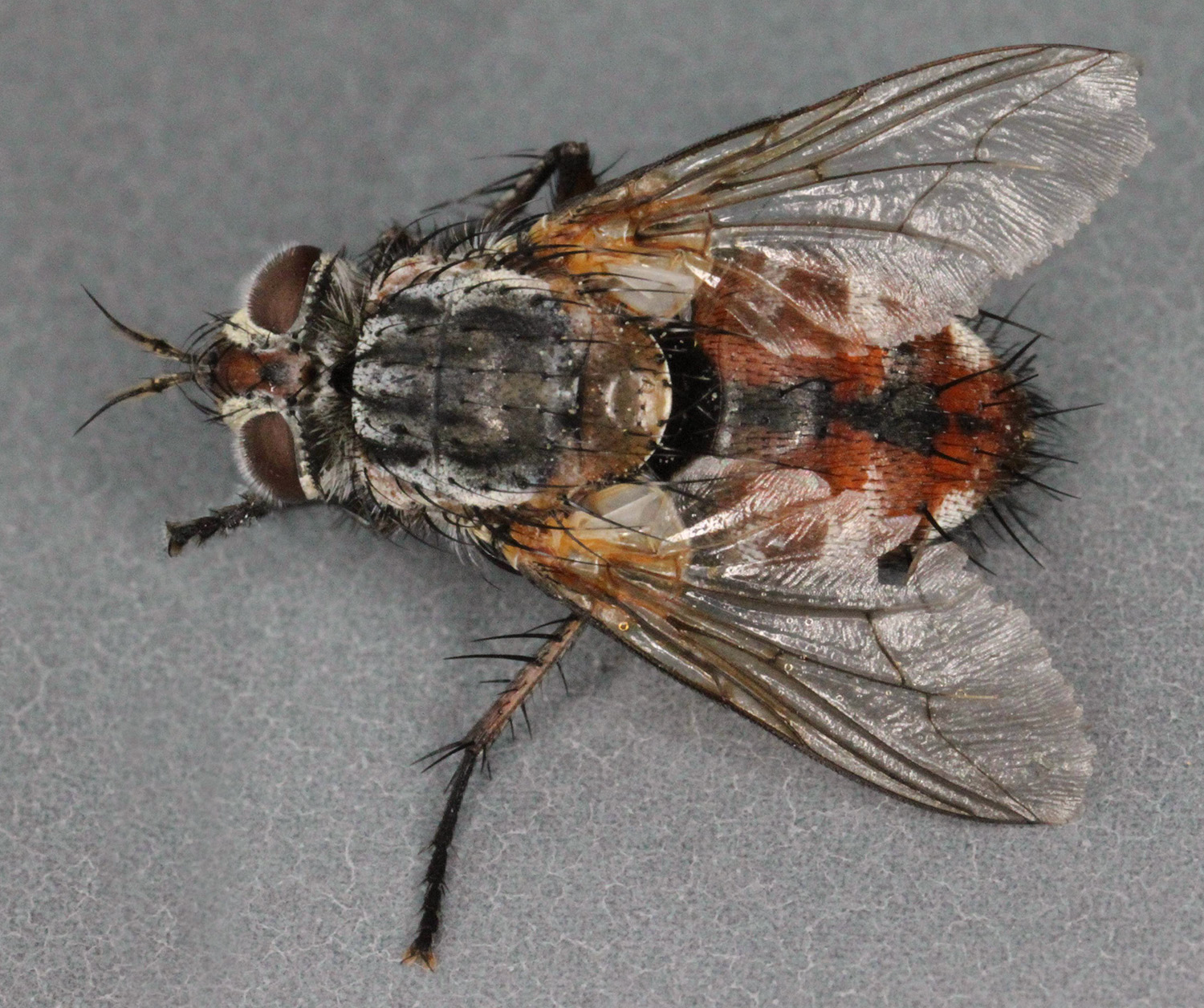

Scientific classification
- Kingdom: Animalia
- Phylum: Arthropoda
- Clade: Pancrustacea
- Class: Insecta
- Order: Diptera
- Family: Tachinidae
- Genus: Linnaemya
- Species: L. vulpina

Binomial name
- Linnaemya vulpina (Fallén, 1810)

Synonyms
- Tachina vulpina (Fallén, 1810)

= Linnaemya vulpina =

Species of fly

Linnaemya vulpina is a European species of fly in the family Tachinidae. The species is a known parasitoid of Leucania loreyi.
