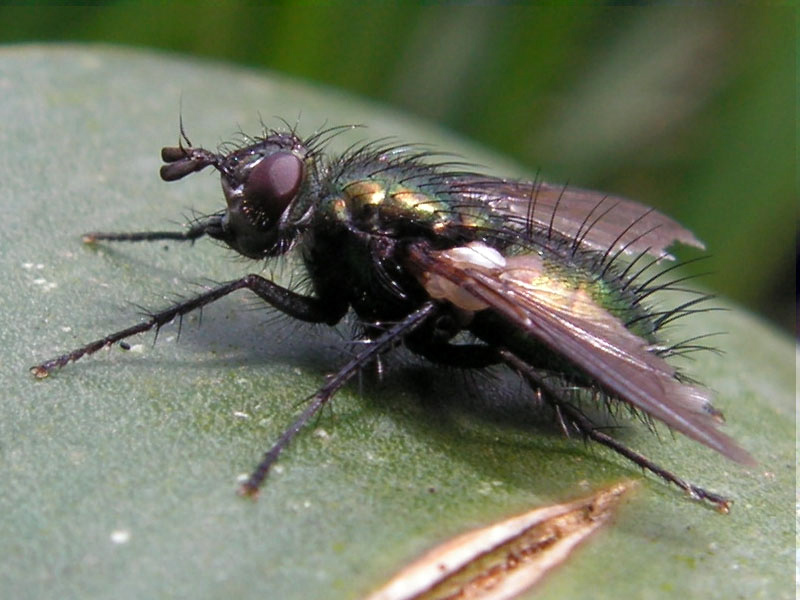
- Gymnocheta viridis

Scientific classification
- Kingdom: Animalia
- Phylum: Arthropoda
- Class: Insecta
- Order: Diptera
- Family: Tachinidae
- Genus: Gymnocheta
- Species: G. viridis

Binomial name
- Gymnocheta viridis (Fallén, 1810)

Synonyms
- Tachina viridis Fallén, 1810

= Gymnocheta viridis =

Species of fly

Gymnocheta viridis is a metallic green tachinid fly found throughout Europe, mainly in springtime.
