= Loewia (fly) =

Scientific classification
- Kingdom: Animalia
- Phylum: Arthropoda
- Class: Insecta
- Order: Diptera
- Family: Tachinidae
- Subfamily: Tachininae
- Tribe: Ernestiini
- Genus: Loewia; Egger, 1856

Type species
- Loewia setibarba Egger, 1856

Synonyms
- Fortisia Rondani, 1861; Oestroloewia Mesnil, 1953; Thrichogena Neave, 1940; Thricogena Rondani, 1859; Thrychogrna Junk, 1914; Trichogena Bezzi & Stein, 1907

Genus of flies

Loewia sp.

Loewia is a genus of flies in the family Tachinidae.

== Species ==
- Loewia adjuncta Herting, 1971
- Loewia alpestris (Villeneuve, 1920)
- Loewia aragvicola Richter, 1972
- Loewia brevifrons (Rondani, 1856)
- Loewia crassipes (Mesnil, 1953)
- Loewia cretica Ziegler, 1996
- Loewia foeda (Meigen, 1824)
- Loewia latifrons Mesnil, 1973
- Loewia montivaga Richter, 1998
- Loewia nudigena Mesnil, 1973
- Loewia papei Cerretti, Lo Giudice & O'Hara, 2014
- Loewia phaeoptera (Meigen, 1824)
- Loewia piliceps Mesnil, 1973
- Loewia piligena Mesnil, 1973
- Loewia rondanii (Villeneuve, 1919)
- Loewia setibarba Egger, 1856
- Loewia submetallica (Macquart, 1855)
