= Loewia (plant) =

Scientific classification
- Kingdom: Plantae
- Clade: Tracheophytes
- Clade: Angiosperms
- Clade: Eudicots
- Clade: Rosids
- Order: Malpighiales
- Family: Passifloraceae
- Subfamily: Turneroideae
- Genus: Loewia; Urb.

Species
- Loewia glutinosa Urb.; Loewia tanaensis Urb.
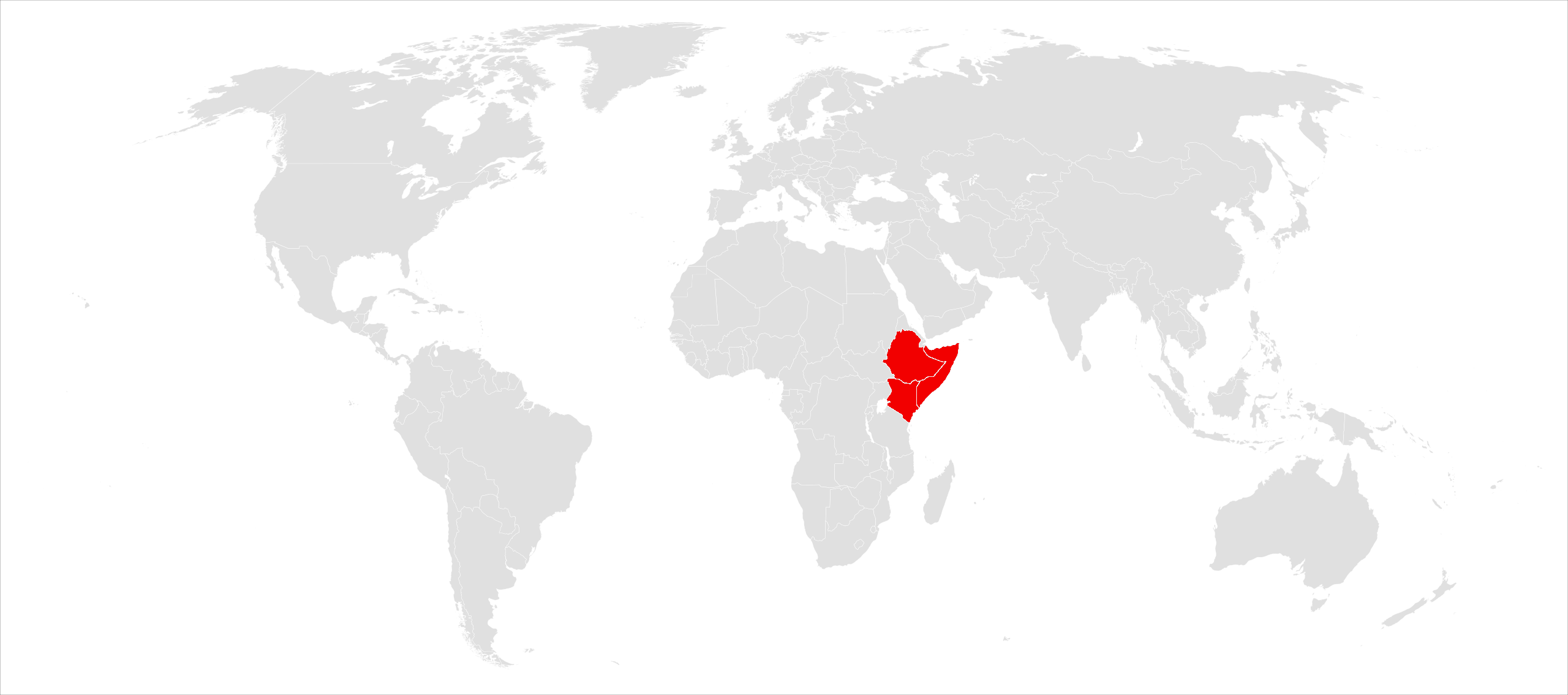

Genus of flowering plants

Loewia is a genus of flowering plants from East Kenya, Ethiopia and Somalia, belonging to the family Passifloraceae.

== Species ==
- Loewia glutinosa Urb.
- Loewia tanaensis Urb.
