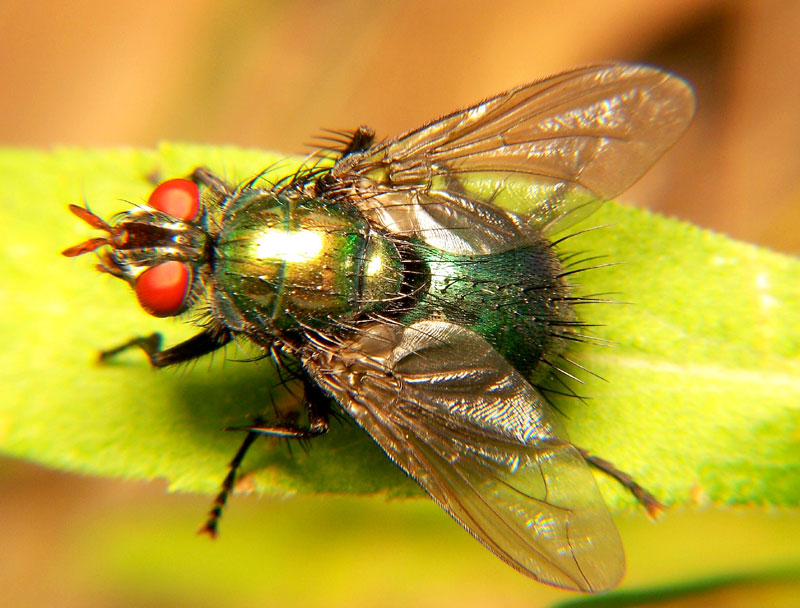
- Gymnocheta viridis

Scientific classification
- Kingdom: Animalia
- Phylum: Arthropoda
- Class: Insecta
- Order: Diptera
- Family: Tachinidae
- Subfamily: Tachininae
- Tribe: Ernestiini

= Ernestiini =

Tribe of flies

Ernestiini is a tribe of flies in the family Tachinidae.

== Genera ==
- Bombyliomyia Brauer & von Berganstamm, 1889
- Brachelia Robineau-Desvoidy, 1830
- Bracheliopsis Emden, 1960
- Bracteola Richter, 1972
- Chaetophthalmus Brauer & von Berganstamm, 1891
- Chiricahuia Townsend, 1918
- Chlorotachina Townsend, 1915
- Chrysosomopsis Townsend, 1916
- Cleonice Robineau-Desvoidy, 1863
- Coloradomyia Arnaud, 1963
- Corybantia Richter, 1986
- Eloceria Robineau-Desvoidy, 1863
- Emporomyia Brauer & von Bergenstamm, 1891
- Erebiomima Mesnil, 1953
- Euhystricia Townsend, 1914
- Everestiomyia Townsend, 1933
- Flavicorniculum Chao & Shi, 1981
- Gastroptilops Mesnil, 1957
- Gymnocheta Robineau-Desvoidy, 1830
- Gymnoglossa Mik, 1898
- Hineomyia Townsend, 1916
- Hyalurgus Brauer & von Bergenstamm, 1893
- Janthinomyia Brauer & von Bergenstamm, 1893
- Lambrusca Richter, 1998
- Linnaemya Robineau-Desvoidy, 1830
- Loewia Egger, 1856
- Lyphosia Mesnil, 1957
- Macrochloria Malloch, 1929
- Marshallomyia Fennah in van Emden, 1960
- Mehmetia Özdikmen, 2007
- Melanophrys Williston, 1886
- Microcerophina Kugler, 1977
- Montuosa Chao & Zhou, 1996
- Munira Richter, 1974
- Neximyia Crosskey, 1967
- Panzeria Robineau-Desvoidy, 1830
- Phobetromyia Reinhard, 1964
- Plagiocoma Villeneuve, 1916
- Schizolinnaea Emden, 1960
- Sonaca Richter, 1981
- Symmorphomyia Mesnil & Shima, 1977
- Synactia Villeneuve, 1915
- Tachinophasia Townsend, 1931
- Trixoclea Villeneuve, 1916
- Zophomyia Macquart, 1835
