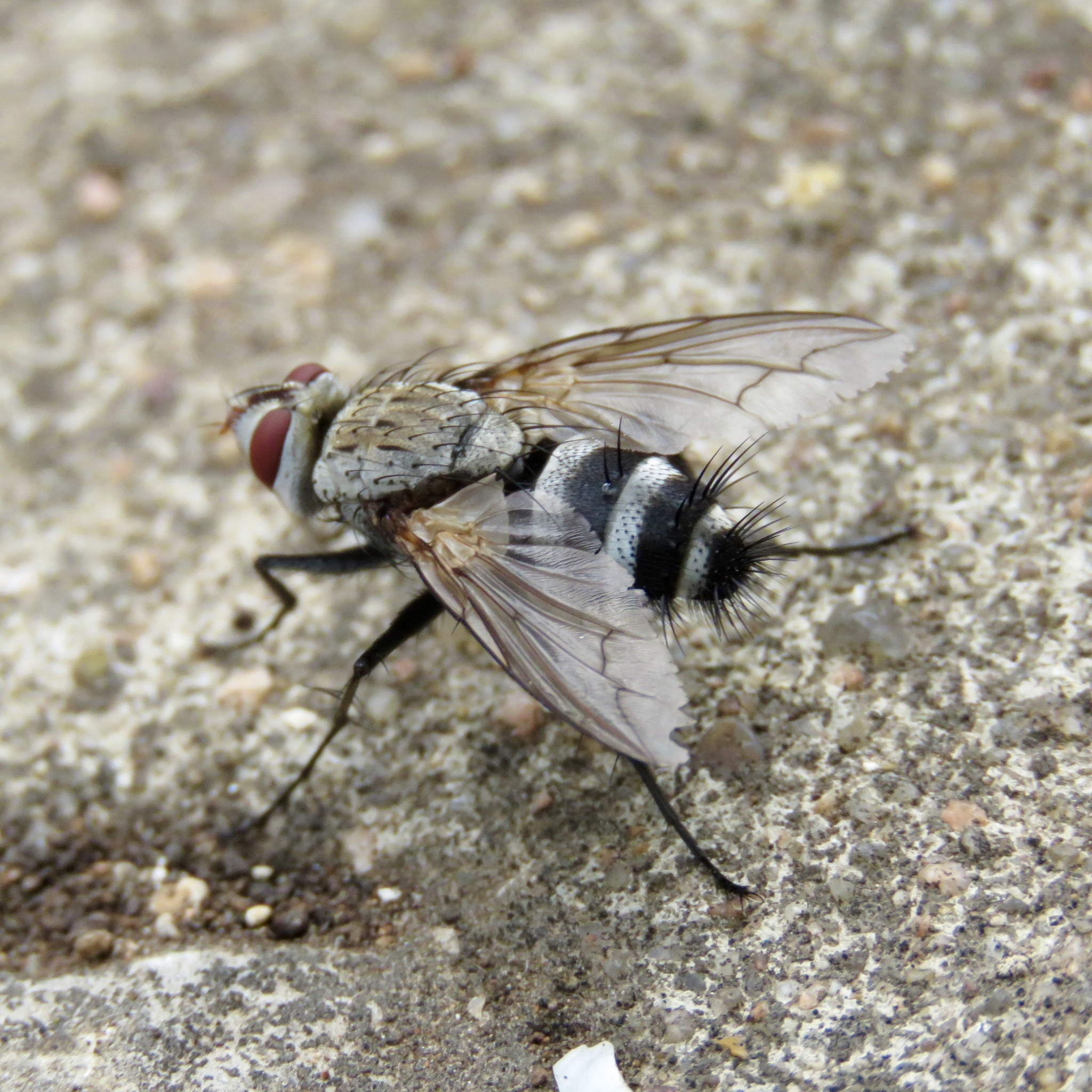

Scientific classification
- Domain: Eukaryota
- Kingdom: Animalia
- Phylum: Arthropoda
- Class: Insecta
- Order: Diptera
- Family: Tachinidae
- Tribe: Megaprosopini
- Genus: Microphthalma
- Species: M. disjuncta

Binomial name
- Microphthalma disjuncta (Wiedemann, 1824)

Synonyms
- Microphthalma nigra Macquart, 1844; Miltogramma trifasciata Say, 1829; Tachina disjuncta Wiedemann, 1824; Tachina trixoides Walker, 1849; Trixa apicalis Walker, 1849

= Microphthalma disjuncta =

Species of fly

Microphthalma disjuncta is a species of bristle fly in the family Tachinidae. It is found in North America.
