= Stuardomyia =

Scientific classification
- Kingdom: Animalia
- Phylum: Arthropoda
- Clade: Pancrustacea
- Class: Insecta
- Order: Diptera
- Family: Tachinidae
- Subfamily: Tachininae
- Tribe: Megaprosopini
- Genus: Stuardomyia; Cortés, 1945

Type species
- Stuardomyia crassiseta Cortés, 1945

Genus of flies

Stuardomyia is a genus of flies in the family Tachinidae.

== Species ==
- Stuardomyia crassiseta Cortés, 1945

== Distribution ==
Argentina, Chile
