= Irengia =

Scientific classification
- Kingdom: Animalia
- Phylum: Arthropoda
- Class: Insecta
- Order: Diptera
- Family: Tachinidae
- Subfamily: Tachininae
- Tribe: Megaprosopini
- Genus: Irengia; Townsend, 1935

Type species
- Irengia guianensis Townsend, 1935

Genus of flies

Irengia is a genus of flies in the family Tachinidae.

== Species ==
- Irengia guianensis Townsend, 1935
- Irengia lativentris (Curran, 1934)
