= Trichoprosopus =

Scientific classification
- Kingdom: Animalia
- Phylum: Arthropoda
- Class: Insecta
- Order: Diptera
- Family: Tachinidae
- Subfamily: Tachininae
- Tribe: Megaprosopini
- Genus: Trichoprosopus; Macquart, 1843

Type species
- Trichoprosopus durvillei Macquart, 1843

Synonyms
- Trichoprosopa Walker, 1860

Genus of flies

Trichoprosopus is a genus of flies in the family Tachinidae.

== Species ==
- Trichoprosopus durvillei Macquart, 1844

== Distribution ==
Chile.
