= Cyrtocladia =

Scientific classification
- Kingdom: Animalia
- Phylum: Arthropoda
- Class: Insecta
- Order: Diptera
- Family: Tachinidae
- Subfamily: Tachininae
- Tribe: Megaprosopini
- Genus: Cyrtocladia; Emden, 1947

Type species
- Cyrtocladia unisetosa Emden, 1947

Genus of flies

Cyrtocladia is a genus of flies in the family Tachinidae.

== Species ==
- Cyrtocladia unisetosa Emden, 1947

== Distribution ==
Kenya.
