= Montanothalma =

Scientific classification
- Kingdom: Animalia
- Phylum: Arthropoda
- Class: Insecta
- Order: Diptera
- Family: Tachinidae
- Subfamily: Tachininae
- Tribe: Megaprosopini
- Genus: Montanothalma; Barraclough, 1996

Type species
- Montanothalma natalensis Barraclough, 1996

Genus of flies

Montanothalma is a genus of flies in the family Tachinidae.

== Species ==
- Montanothalma natalensis Barraclough, 1996

== Distribution ==
South Africa
