= Trichoceronia =

Scientific classification
- Kingdom: Animalia
- Phylum: Arthropoda
- Class: Insecta
- Order: Diptera
- Family: Tachinidae
- Subfamily: Tachininae
- Tribe: Megaprosopini
- Genus: Trichoceronia; Cortés, 1945

Type species
- Trichoceronia thermitana Cortés, 1945

Genus of flies

Trichoceronia is a genus of flies in the family Tachinidae.

== Species ==
- Trichoceronia latifrons (Aldrich, 1934)
- Trichoceronia thermitana Cortés, 1945
