= Amesiomima =

Scientific classification
- Kingdom: Animalia
- Phylum: Arthropoda
- Class: Insecta
- Order: Diptera
- Family: Tachinidae
- Subfamily: Tachininae
- Tribe: Megaprosopini
- Genus: Amesiomima; Mesnil, 1950

Type species
- Amesiomima fulvella Mesnil, 1950

Genus of flies

Amesiomima is a genus of flies in the family Tachinidae.

== Species ==
- Amesiomima fulvella Mesnil, 1950

== Distribution ==
Rwanda.
