= Acronacantha =

Scientific classification
- Kingdom: Animalia
- Phylum: Arthropoda
- Class: Insecta
- Order: Diptera
- Family: Tachinidae
- Subfamily: Tachininae
- Tribe: Megaprosopini
- Genus: Acronacantha; Wulp, 1891

Type species
- Acronacantha nubilipennis Wulp, 1891

Genus of flies

Acronacantha is a genus of flies in the family Tachinidae.

== Species ==
- Acronacantha nubilipennis Wulp, 1891

== Distribution ==
Costa Rica
