= Richteriola =

Scientific classification
- Kingdom: Animalia
- Phylum: Arthropoda
- Class: Insecta
- Order: Diptera
- Family: Tachinidae
- Subfamily: Tachininae
- Tribe: Megaprosopini
- Genus: Richteriola; Mesnil, 1963

Type species
- Richteriola portentosa Mesnil, 1963

Genus of flies

Richteriola is a genus of flies in the family Tachinidae.

== Species ==
- Richteriola beata Richter, 1975
- Richteriola portentosa Mesnil, 1963
