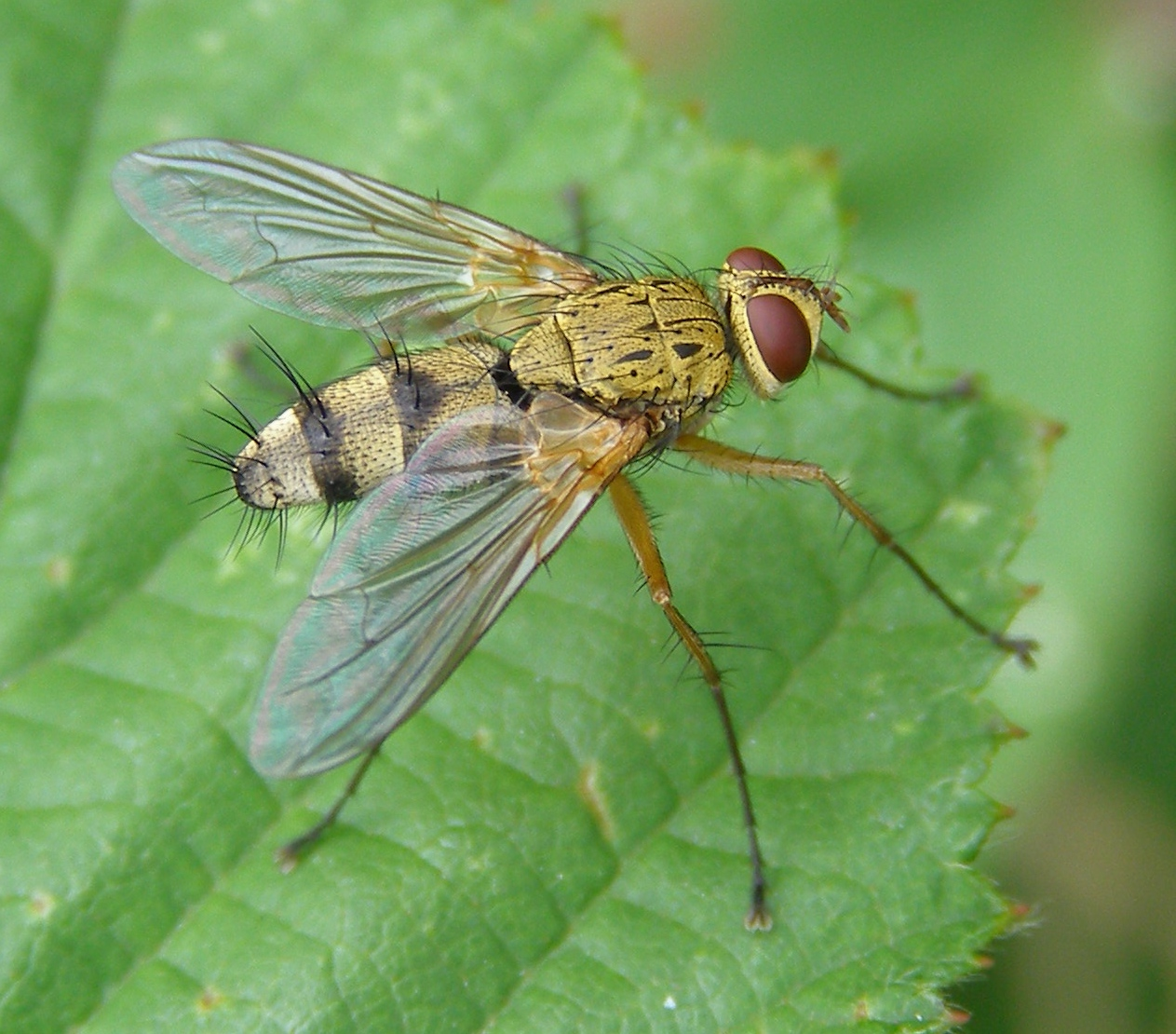
- Dexiosoma caninum

Scientific classification
- Kingdom: Animalia
- Phylum: Arthropoda
- Class: Insecta
- Order: Diptera
- Family: Tachinidae
- Subfamily: Tachininae
- Tribe: Megaprosopini
- Genus: Dexiosoma; Rondani, 1856

Type species
- Musca canina Fabricius, 1781

Synonyms
- Eodexiosoma Townsend, 1926

= Dexiosoma =

Genus of flies

Dexiosoma is a genus of flies in the family Tachinidae.

== Species ==
- Dexiosoma aristatum Mesnil, 1970
- Dexiosoma caninum (Fabricius, 1781)
- Dexiosoma lativittata Zhang & Liu, 2006
- Dexiosoma lineatum Mesnil, 1970
- Dexiosoma sumatrense (Townsend, 1926)
