= Megaprosopus =

Scientific classification
- Kingdom: Animalia
- Phylum: Arthropoda
- Class: Insecta
- Order: Diptera
- Family: Tachinidae
- Subfamily: Tachininae
- Tribe: Megaprosopini
- Genus: Megaprosopus; Macquart, 1843

Type species
- Megaprosopus rufiventris Macquart, 1844

Synonyms
- Cochisemyia Reinhard, 1964

Genus of flies

Megaprosopus is a genus of flies in the family Tachinidae.

== Species ==
- Megaprosopus andinus Townsend, 1912
- Megaprosopus regalis (Reinhard, 1964)
- Megaprosopus rufiventris Macquart, 1844
