= Melisoneura =

Scientific classification
- Kingdom: Animalia
- Phylum: Arthropoda
- Class: Insecta
- Order: Diptera
- Family: Tachinidae
- Subfamily: Tachininae
- Tribe: Megaprosopini
- Genus: Melisoneura; Rondani, 1861

Type species
- Melia albipennis Robineau-Desvoidy, 1830

Synonyms
- Melia Robineau-Desvoidy, 1830; Melizoneura Bezzi & Stein, 1907; Melizoneura Rondani, 1868

Genus of flies

Melisoneura is a genus of flies in the family Tachinidae.

== Species ==
- Melisoneura leucoptera (Meigen, 1824)
