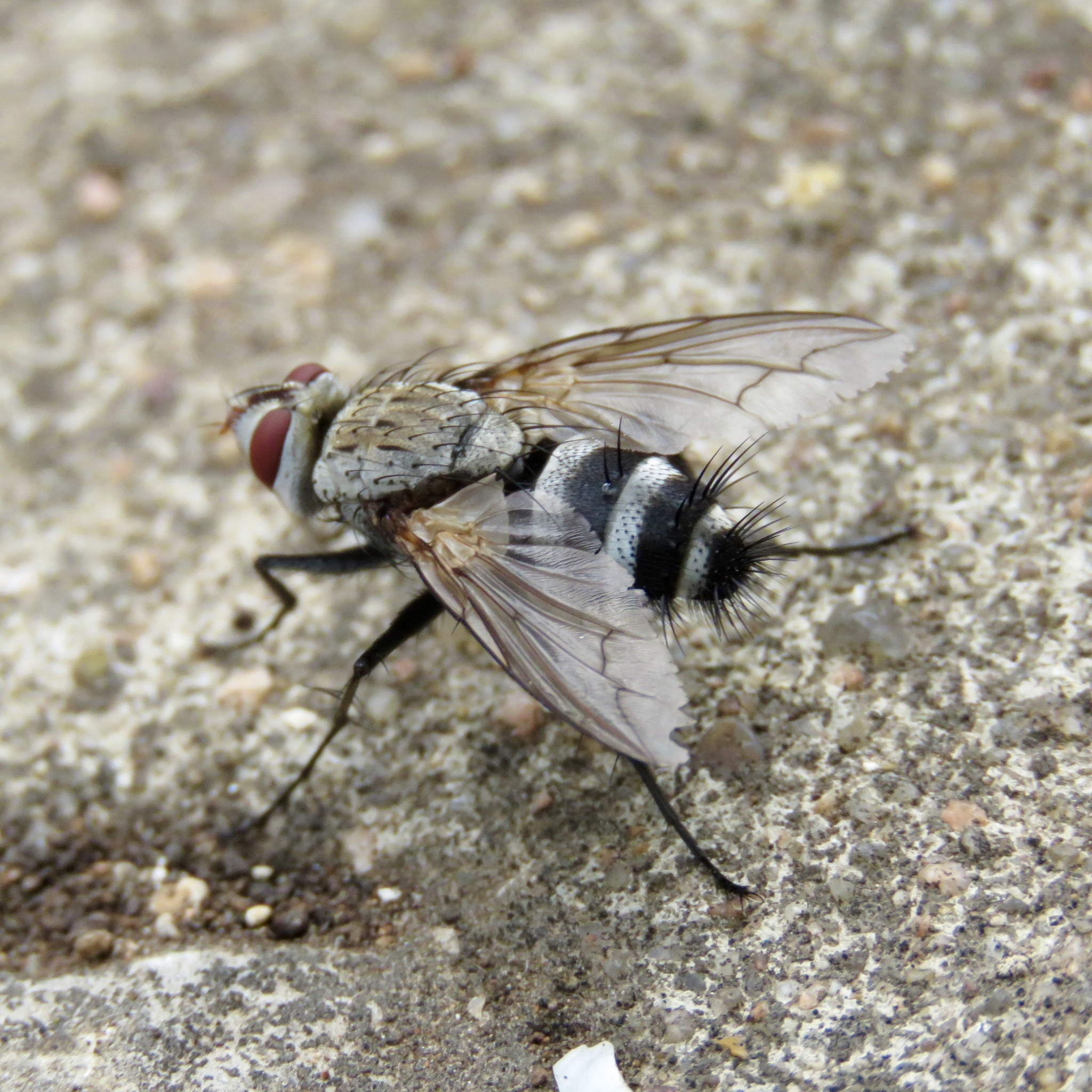
- Microphthalma disjuncta

Scientific classification
- Kingdom: Animalia
- Phylum: Arthropoda
- Clade: Pancrustacea
- Class: Insecta
- Order: Diptera
- Family: Tachinidae
- Subfamily: Tachininae
- Tribe: Megaprosopini
- Genus: Microphthalma; Macquart, 1843

Type species
- Microphthalma nigra Macquart, 1843

Synonyms
- Amesia Robineau-Desvoidy, 1863; Amesioclea Villeneuve, 1936; Eumicrophthalma Townsend, 1915; Perua Townsend, 1912; Prodexilla Townsend, 1933

= Microphthalma =

Genus of flies

Microphthalma is a genus of flies in the family Tachinidae.

== Species ==
- Microphthalma ascita Reinhard, 1953
- Microphthalma crouzeli Blanchard, 1966
- Microphthalma cuzcana (Townsend, 1912)
- Microphthalma differens (Wulp, 1890)
- Microphthalma disjuncta (Wiedemann, 1824)
- Microphthalma europacea Egger, 1860
- Microphthalma europaea Egger, 1860
- Microphthalma flavipes Mesnil, 1950
- Microphthalma michiganensis (Townsend, 1892)
- Microphthalma nigeriensis Villeneuve, 1935
- Microphthalma nox Zeegers, 2007
- Microphthalma pedalis Reinhard, 1953
- Microphthalma posio (Walker, 1849)
- Microphthalma ruficeps Aldrich, 1926
- Microphthalma sejuncta (Walker, 1858)
- Microphthalma vibrissata (Wulp, 1891)
- Microphthalma virens Aldrich, 1926
