= Pyrrhodexia =

Scientific classification
- Kingdom: Animalia
- Phylum: Arthropoda
- Class: Insecta
- Order: Diptera
- Family: Tachinidae
- Subfamily: Tachininae
- Tribe: Megaprosopini
- Genus: Pyrrhodexia; Townsend, 1931

Type species
- Dexia pyrrhoprocta Wiedemann, 1830

Genus of flies

Pyrrhodexia is a genus of flies in the family Tachinidae.

== Species ==
- Pyrrhodexia pyrrhoprocta (Wiedemann, 1830)

== Distribution ==
Brazil.
