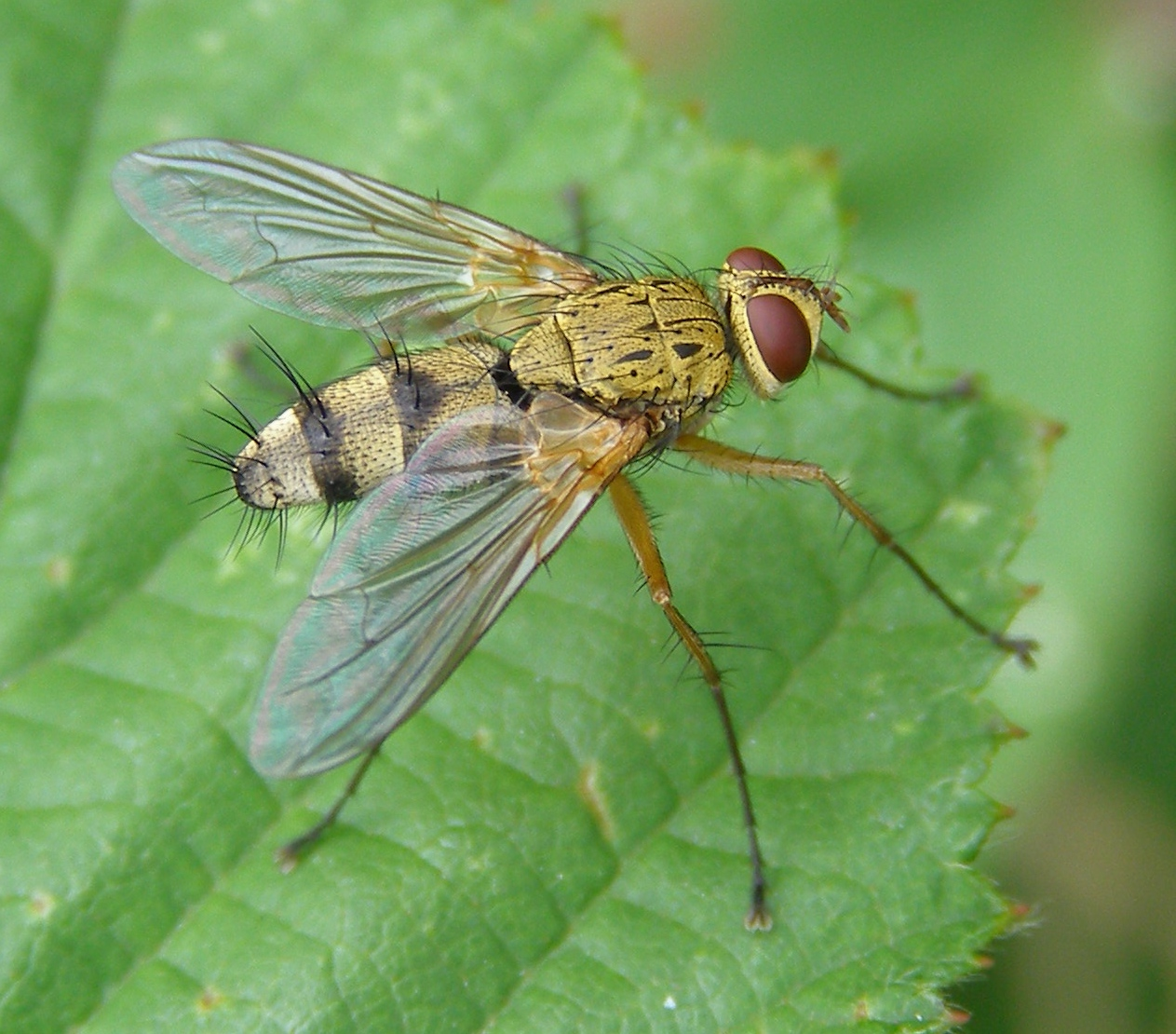

Scientific classification
- Kingdom: Animalia
- Phylum: Arthropoda
- Clade: Pancrustacea
- Class: Insecta
- Order: Diptera
- Family: Tachinidae
- Subfamily: Tachininae
- Tribe: Megaprosopini
- Genus: Dexiosoma
- Species: D. caninum

Binomial name
- Dexiosoma caninum (Fabricius, 1781)

Synonyms
- Musca caninum Fabricius, 1781; Musca chrysostoma Stephens, 1829; Musca volets Harris, 1780

= Dexiosoma caninum =

Species of fly

Dexiosoma caninum is a European species of fly in the family Tachinidae. In the United Kingdom, the species can most commonly be found during the summer in the south of England.

== Distribution ==
British Isles, Czech Republic, Hungary, Latvia, Poland, Romania, Slovakia, Ukraine, Denmark, Finland, Norway, Sweden, Bosnia and Herzegovina, Bulgaria, Croatia, Italy, Slovenia, Austria, Belgium, Channel Islands, France, Germany, Netherlands, Switzerland, Japan, Russia, China.
