= Parhamaxia =

Scientific classification
- Kingdom: Animalia
- Phylum: Arthropoda
- Class: Insecta
- Order: Diptera
- Family: Tachinidae
- Subfamily: Tachininae
- Tribe: Megaprosopini
- Genus: Parhamaxia; Mesnil, 1967

Type species
- Parhamaxia discalis Mesnil, 1967

Genus of flies

Parhamaxia is a genus of flies in the family Tachinidae.

== Species ==
- Parhamaxia antennata Richter, 1991
- Parhamaxia discalis Mesnil, 1967
- Parhamaxia palposa Richter, 1991
