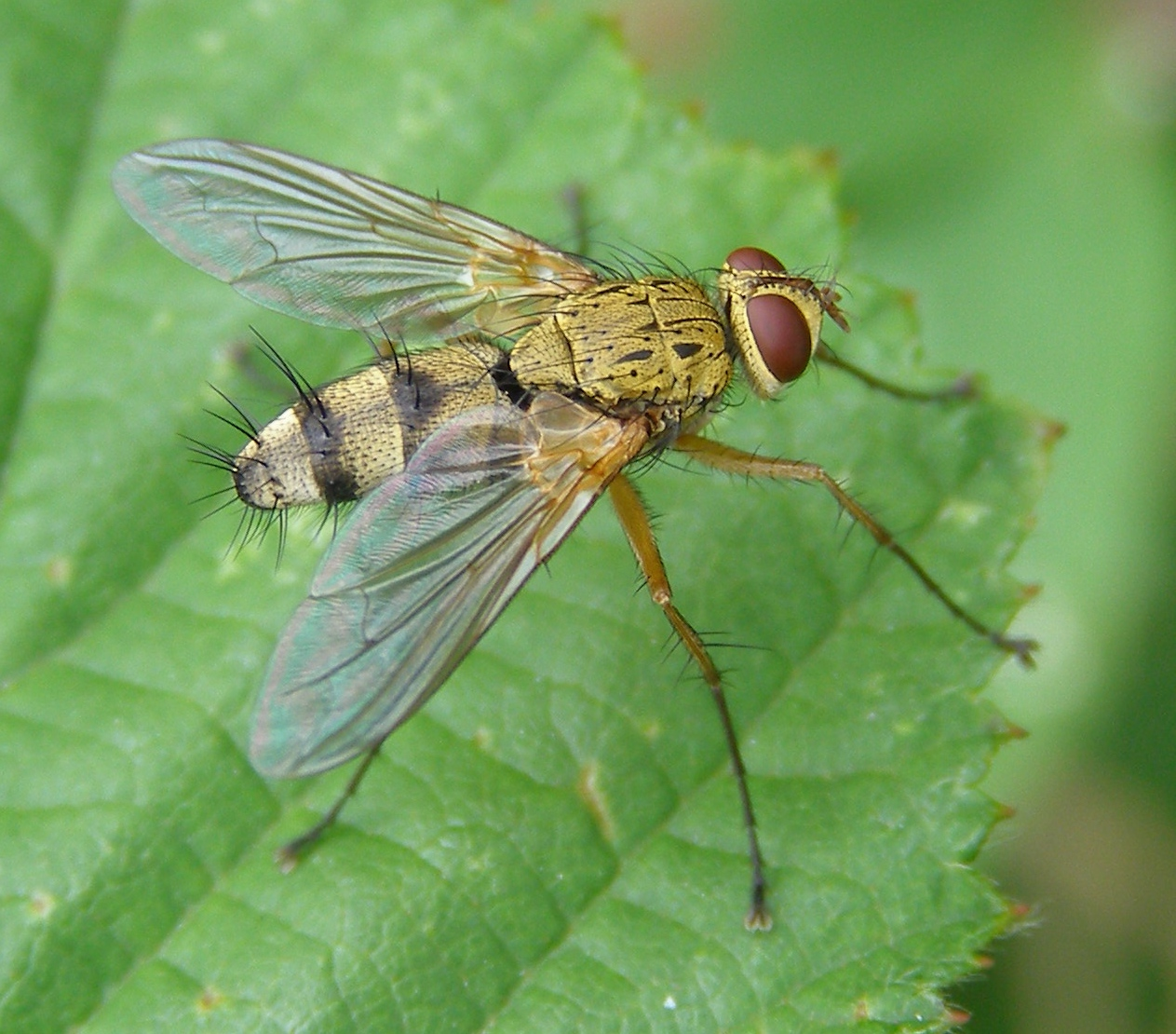
- Dexiosoma caninum

Scientific classification
- Domain: Eukaryota
- Kingdom: Animalia
- Phylum: Arthropoda
- Class: Insecta
- Order: Diptera
- Family: Tachinidae
- Subfamily: Tachininae
- Tribe: Megaprosopini

= Megaprosopini =

Tribe of flies

Megaprosopini is a tribe of bristle flies in the family Tachinidae.

== Genera ==
- Acronacantha Wulp, 1891
- Amesiomima Mesnil, 1950
- Ciala Richter, 1976
- Cyrtocladia Van Emden, 1947
- Dexiosoma Rondani, 1856
- Irengia Townsend, 1935
- Megaprosopus Macquart, 1844
- Melisoneura Rondani, 1861
- Microphthalma Macquart, 1844
- Montanothalma Barraclough, 1996
- Parhamaxia Mesnil, 1967
- Protrichoprosopis Blanchard, 1966
- Pyrrhodexia Townsend, 1931
- Richteriola Mesnil, 1963
- Stuardomyia Cortés, 1945
- Trichoceronia Cortés, 1945
- Trichoprosopus Macquart, 1844
