= Germaria ruficeps =

Scientific classification
- Kingdom: Animalia
- Phylum: Arthropoda
- Class: Insecta
- Order: Diptera
- Family: Tachinidae
- Subfamily: Tachininae
- Tribe: Germariini
- Genus: Germaria
- Species: G. ruficeps

Binomial name
- Germaria ruficeps (Fallén, 1820)

Synonyms
- Tachina ruficeps Fallén, 1820; Germaria latifrons Robineau-Desvoidy, 1830

Species of fly

Germaria ruficeps is a species of tachinid flies in the genus Germaria of the family Tachinidae.

== Distribution ==
Belgium, United Kingdom, France, Denmark, Sweden, Hungary, Russia, Mongolia, Israel.
