= Phantasiomyia atripes =

Scientific classification
- Kingdom: Animalia
- Phylum: Arthropoda
- Class: Insecta
- Order: Diptera
- Family: Tachinidae
- Subfamily: Tachininae
- Tribe: Leskiini
- Genus: Phantasiomyia
- Species: P. atripes

Binomial name
- Phantasiomyia atripes (Coquillett, 1897)

Synonyms
- Thryptocera atripes Coquillett, 1897

Species of fly

Phantasiomyia atripes is a species of flies in the family Tachinidae.

== Distribution ==
Southwest United States.
