= Clausicella turmalis =

Scientific classification
- Kingdom: Animalia
- Phylum: Arthropoda
- Class: Insecta
- Order: Diptera
- Family: Tachinidae
- Subfamily: Tachininae
- Tribe: Leskiini
- Genus: Clausicella
- Species: C. turmalis

Binomial name
- Clausicella turmalis (Reinhard, 1946)

Synonyms
- Coronimyia turmalis Reinhard, 1946

Species of fly

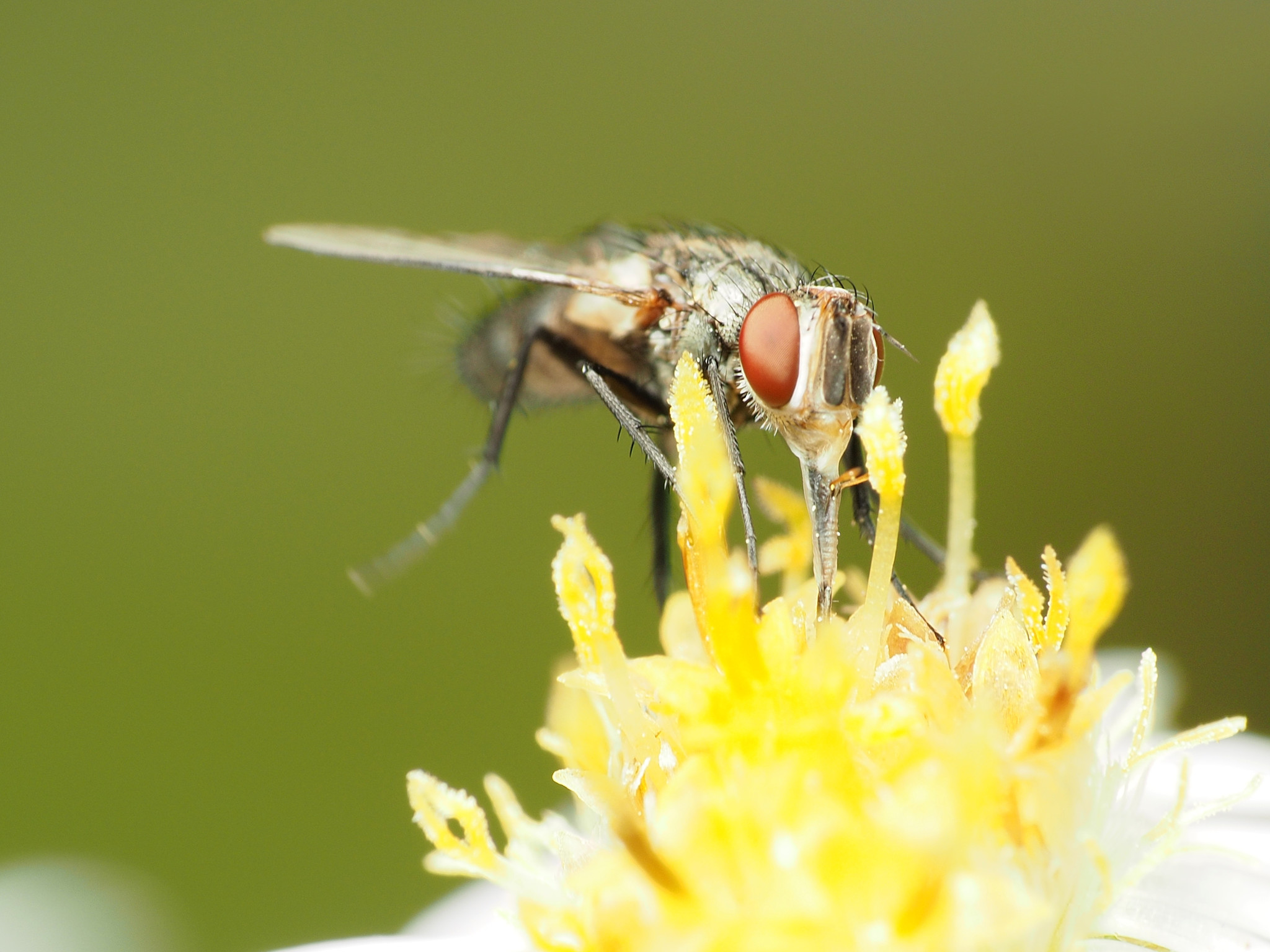
Clausicella turmalis

Clausicella turmalis is a species of bristle fly in the family Tachinidae.

== Distribution ==
Canada, United States.
