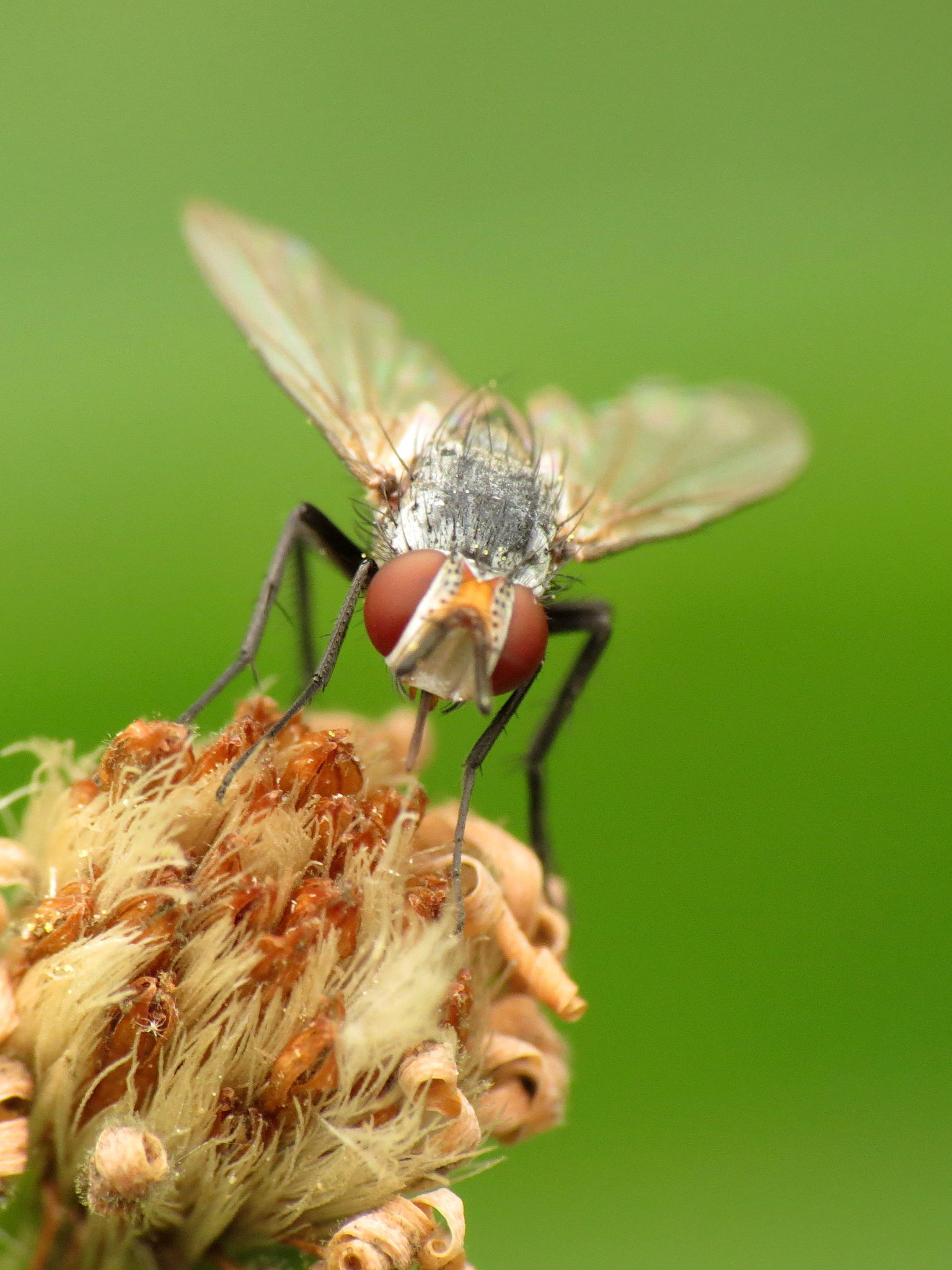

Scientific classification
- Kingdom: Animalia
- Phylum: Arthropoda
- Class: Insecta
- Order: Diptera
- Family: Tachinidae
- Subfamily: Tachininae
- Tribe: Leskiini
- Genus: Clausicella
- Species: C. floridensis

Binomial name
- Clausicella floridensis (Townsend, 1892)

Synonyms
- Siphophyto floridensis Townsend, 1892

= Clausicella floridensis =

Species of fly

Clausicella floridensis is a species of bristle fly in the family Tachinidae.

== Distribution ==
Canada, United States.
