= Lydina americana =

Scientific classification
- Kingdom: Animalia
- Phylum: Arthropoda
- Class: Insecta
- Order: Diptera
- Family: Tachinidae
- Subfamily: Tachininae
- Tribe: Polideini
- Genus: Lydina
- Species: L. americana

Binomial name
- Lydina americana (Townsend, 1892)

Synonyms
- Tryphera americana Townsend, 1892; Tryphera polidoides Townsend, 1892

Species of fly

Lydina americana is a species of bristle fly in the family Tachinidae.

== Distribution ==
Canada, United States.
