= Clausicella xanthocera =

Scientific classification
- Kingdom: Animalia
- Phylum: Arthropoda
- Class: Insecta
- Order: Diptera
- Family: Tachinidae
- Subfamily: Tachininae
- Tribe: Leskiini
- Genus: Clausicella
- Species: C. xanthocera

Binomial name
- Clausicella xanthocera (Richter, 1972)

Synonyms
- Hasmica xanthocera Richter, 1972

Species of fly

Clausicella xanthocera is a species of tachinid flies in the genus Clausicella of the family Tachinidae.
