= Clausicella opaca =

Scientific classification
- Kingdom: Animalia
- Phylum: Arthropoda
- Class: Insecta
- Order: Diptera
- Family: Tachinidae
- Subfamily: Tachininae
- Tribe: Leskiini
- Genus: Clausicella
- Species: C. opaca

Binomial name
- Clausicella opaca (Coquillett, 1895)

Synonyms
- Siphophyto opacus Coquillett, 1892

Species of fly

Clausicella opaca is a species of bristle fly in the family Tachinidae. It was first described by Daniel William Coquillett in 1895.

== Distribution ==
Canada, United States.
