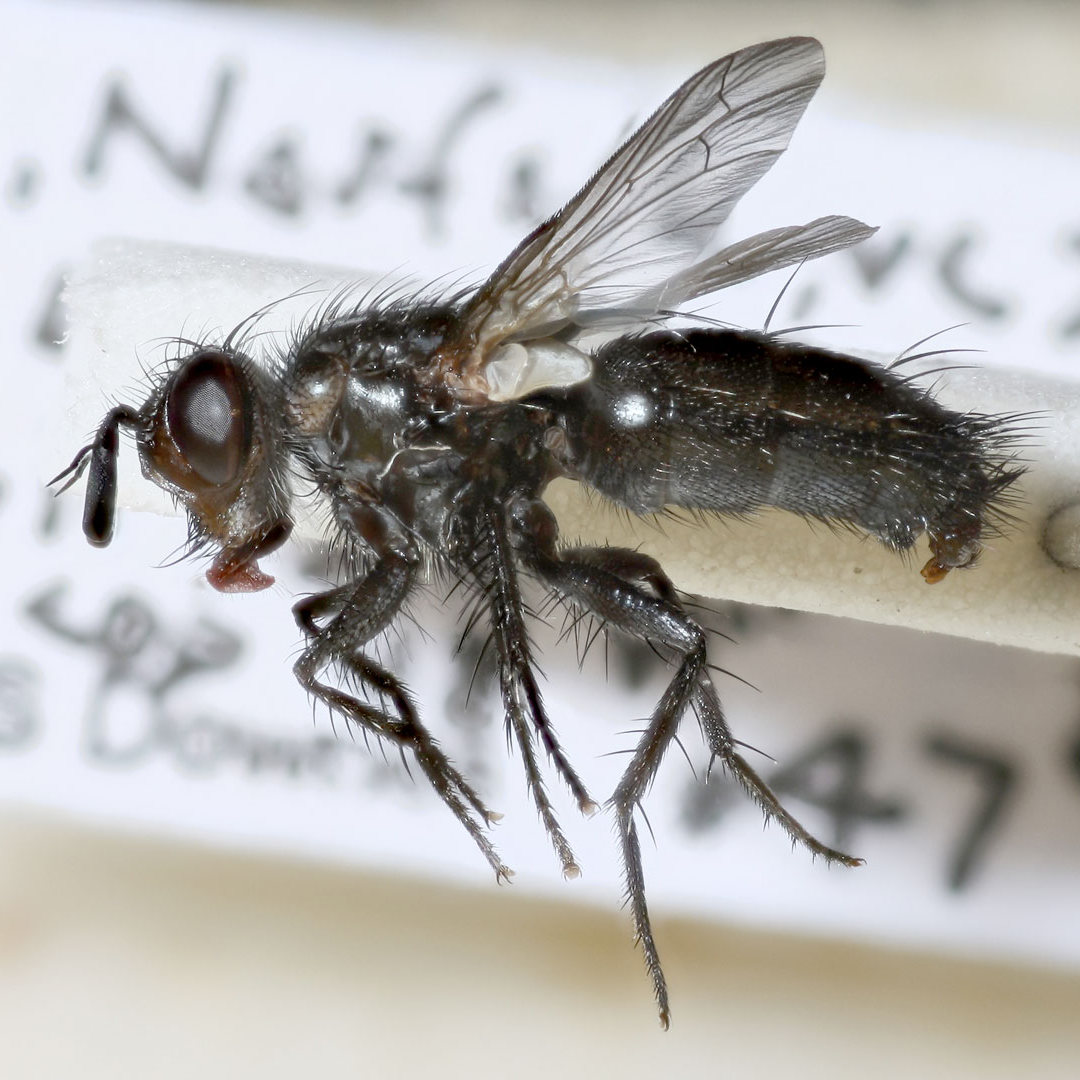

Scientific classification
- Kingdom: Animalia
- Phylum: Arthropoda
- Class: Insecta
- Order: Diptera
- Family: Tachinidae
- Subfamily: Tachininae
- Tribe: Germariini
- Genus: Germaria
- Species: G. angustata

Binomial name
- Germaria angustata (Zetterstedt, 1844)

Synonyms
- Gonia angustata Zetterstedt, 1844; Tachina lugubrina Zetterstedt, 1844; Tachina humeralis Zetterstedt, 1859; Germaria sabulosa Wulp, 1869

= Germaria angustata =

Species of fly

Germaria angustata is a species of tachinid flies in the genus Germaria of the family Tachinidae.

== Distribution ==
United Kingdom, Denmark, Netherlands, Germany, Hungary, Russia, Mongolia, China.
