= Clausicella setigera =

Scientific classification
- Kingdom: Animalia
- Phylum: Arthropoda
- Class: Insecta
- Order: Diptera
- Family: Tachinidae
- Subfamily: Tachininae
- Tribe: Leskiini
- Genus: Clausicella
- Species: C. setigera

Binomial name
- Clausicella setigera (Coquillett, 1895)

Synonyms
- Siphophyto setiger Coquillett, 1892

Species of fly

Clausicella setigera is a species of bristle fly in the family Tachinidae.

== Distribution ==
Canada, United States.
