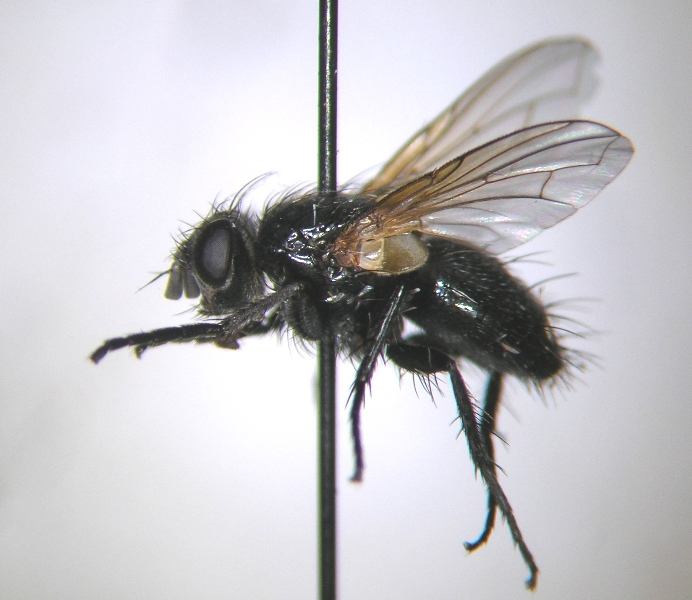
- Lydina aenea

Scientific classification
- Kingdom: Animalia
- Phylum: Arthropoda
- Clade: Pancrustacea
- Class: Insecta
- Order: Diptera
- Family: Tachinidae
- Subfamily: Tachininae
- Tribe: Polideini
- Genus: Lydina
- Species: L. aenea

Binomial name
- Lydina aenea (Meigen, 1824)

Synonyms
- Tachina aenea Meigen, 1824; Harrisia rebaptizata Rondani, 1859; Lydina macromera Robineau-Desvoidy, 1830; Lydina nitida Robineau-Desvoidy, 1830; Tachina crassitarsis Zetterstedt, 1838; Tachina grossiscornis Zetterstedt, 1838; Tachina motor Walker, 1853; Tachina reformata Walker, 1853; Tachina simplicitarsis Zetterstedt, 1838; Zophomyia flavicalyptrata Macquart, 1855

= Lydina aenea =

Species of fly

Lydina aenea is a European species of fly in the family Tachinidae.

== Distribution ==
British Isles, Belarus, Czech Republic, Estonia, Moldova, Poland, Romania, Slovakia, Ukraine, Finland, Norway, Sweden, Albania, Bulgaria, Greece, Italy, Portugal, Serbia, Slovenia, Spain, Turkey, Austria, Belgium, France, Germany, Liechtenstein, Netherlands, Switzerland, Iran, Mongolia, Russia, China, Armenia.
