= Phantasiomyia gracilis =

Scientific classification
- Kingdom: Animalia
- Phylum: Arthropoda
- Class: Insecta
- Order: Diptera
- Family: Tachinidae
- Subfamily: Tachininae
- Tribe: Leskiini
- Genus: Phantasiomyia
- Species: P. gracilis

Binomial name
- Phantasiomyia gracilis Townsend, 1915

Species of fly

Phantasiomyia gracilis is a species of bristle flies in the genus Phantasiomyia.

== Distribution ==
Canada, Southwest United States.
