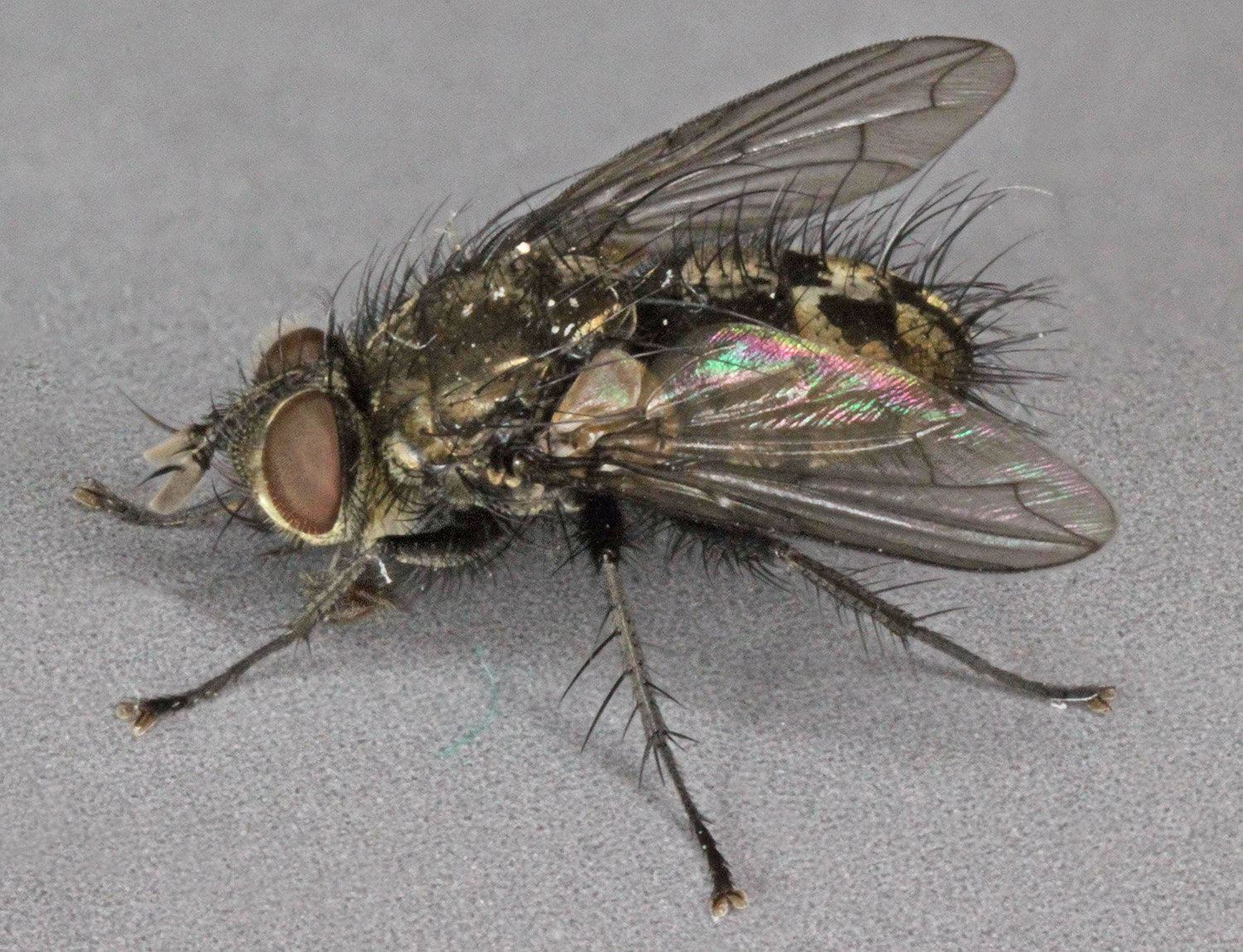
- Lypha dubia Deeside, North Wales, March 2012

Scientific classification
- Kingdom: Animalia
- Phylum: Arthropoda
- Clade: Pancrustacea
- Class: Insecta
- Order: Diptera
- Family: Tachinidae
- Subfamily: Tachininae
- Tribe: Polideini
- Genus: Lypha
- Species: L. dubia

Binomial name
- Lypha dubia Fallén, 1810

Synonyms
- Enthenis ciligera Robineau-Desvoidy, 1863; Exorista berberidis Meigen, 1838; Lypha dubia (Walker, 1853); Lypha grisea Robineau-Desvoidy, 1863; Lypha nigripalpis Robineau-Desvoidy, 1863; Lypha silvatica Robineau-Desvoidy, 1830; Musca berberidis Meigen, 1824; Tachina comissa Walker, 1853; Tachina comosa Walker, 1853; Tachina dubia Fallén, 1810; Tachina interruptella Zetterstedt, 1844; Tachina intersecta Walker, 1853; Tachina umbrinervis Zetterstedt, 1844

= Lypha dubia =

Species of fly

Lypha dubia is a European and Asian species of fly in the family Tachinidae.

== Distribution ==
British Isles, Belarus, Czech Republic, Hungary, Lithuania, Moldova, Poland, Romania, Slovakia, Ukraine, Denmark, Finland, Norway, Sweden, Andorra, Bulgaria, Croatia, Greece, Italy, Portugal, Slovenia, Spain, Turkey, Austria, Belgium, France, Germany, Netherlands, Switzerland, Japan, China, Mongolia, Russia, Transcaucasia.
