= Ostracophyto flavicaudalis =

Scientific classification
- Kingdom: Animalia
- Phylum: Arthropoda
- Class: Insecta
- Order: Diptera
- Family: Tachinidae
- Subfamily: Tachininae
- Tribe: Polideini
- Genus: Ostracophyto
- Species: O. flavicaudalis

Binomial name
- Ostracophyto flavicaudalis O'Hara, 2002

Species of fly

Ostracophyto flavicaudalis is a species of bristle fly in the family Tachinidae.

== Distribution ==
United States.
