= Clausicella neomexicana =

Scientific classification
- Kingdom: Animalia
- Phylum: Arthropoda
- Class: Insecta
- Order: Diptera
- Family: Tachinidae
- Subfamily: Tachininae
- Tribe: Leskiini
- Genus: Clausicella
- Species: C. neomexicana

Binomial name
- Clausicella neomexicana (Townsend, 1892)

Synonyms
- Siphophyto neomexicana Townsend, 1892

Species of fly

Clausicella neomexicana is a species of bristle fly in the family Tachinidae found in Canada, the United States, and Mexico.
