= Drepanoglossa tenuirostris =

Scientific classification
- Kingdom: Animalia
- Phylum: Arthropoda
- Class: Insecta
- Order: Diptera
- Family: Tachinidae
- Subfamily: Tachininae
- Tribe: Leskiini
- Genus: Drepanoglossa
- Species: D. tenuirostris

Binomial name
- Drepanoglossa tenuirostris (Reinhard, 1939)

Synonyms
- Philocalia tenuirostris Reinhard, 1939; Evanalia medicinensis Strickland, 1941

Species of fly

Drepanoglossa tenuirostris is a species of bristle fly in the family Tachinidae.

== Distribution ==
Canada, United States.
