= Micronychia ruficauda =

Scientific classification
- Kingdom: Animalia
- Phylum: Arthropoda
- Clade: Pancrustacea
- Class: Insecta
- Order: Diptera
- Family: Tachinidae
- Subfamily: Tachininae
- Tribe: Polideini
- Genus: Micronychia
- Species: M. ruficauda

Binomial name
- Micronychia ruficauda (Zetterstedt, 1838)

Synonyms
- Tachina ruficauda Zetterstedt, 1838; Micronychia punctum Brauer & von Berganstamm, 1889; Tachina maculipennis Zetterstedt, 1844

Species of fly

Micronychia ruficauda is a European species of fly in the family Tachinidae.

== Distribution ==
British Isles, Czech Republic, Estonia, Poland, Romania, Slovakia, Denmark, Finland, Norway, Sweden, Italy, Austria, Belgium, France, Germany, Netherlands, Switzerland, Russia.
