= Chrysotachina longipennis =

Scientific classification
- Domain: Eukaryota
- Kingdom: Animalia
- Phylum: Arthropoda
- Class: Insecta
- Order: Diptera
- Family: Tachinidae
- Tribe: Polideini
- Genus: Chrysotachina
- Species: C. longipennis

Binomial name
- Chrysotachina longipennis O'Hara, 2002

Species of fly

Chrysotachina longipennis is a species of bristle fly in the family Tachinidae. It is found in North America.
