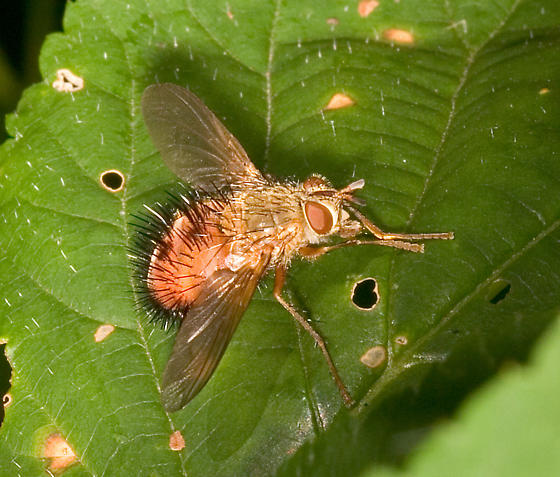
- Hystricia abrupta

Scientific classification
- Kingdom: Animalia
- Phylum: Arthropoda
- Class: Insecta
- Order: Diptera
- Family: Tachinidae
- Subfamily: Tachininae
- Tribe: Polideini
- Genus: Hystricia
- Species: H. abrupta

Binomial name
- Hystricia abrupta (Wiedemann, 1830)

Synonyms
- Hystricia fulvida Bigot, 1887; Tachina abrupta Wiedemann, 1830; Tachina finitima Walker, 1849; Tachina vivida Harris, 1841

= Hystricia abrupta =

Species of fly

Hystricia abrupta is a species of bristle fly in the family Tachinidae.

== Distribution ==
Canada, United States, Mexico.
