= Lypha setifacies =

Scientific classification
- Kingdom: Animalia
- Phylum: Arthropoda
- Class: Insecta
- Order: Diptera
- Family: Tachinidae
- Tribe: Polideini
- Genus: Lypha
- Species: L. setifacies

Binomial name
- Lypha setifacies (West, 1925)

Synonyms
- Didyma setifacies West, 1925; Lypha intermedia Brooks, 1945

Species of fly

Lypha setifacies is a species of bristle fly in the family Tachinidae.

== Distribution ==
Canada, United States.
