= Chrysotachina amazonica =

Scientific classification
- Domain: Eukaryota
- Kingdom: Animalia
- Phylum: Arthropoda
- Class: Insecta
- Order: Diptera
- Family: Tachinidae
- Genus: Chrysotachina
- Species: C. amazonica

Binomial name
- Chrysotachina amazonica (Townsend, 1934)

Species of fly

Chrysotachina amazonica is a species of fly in the genus Chrysotachina of the family Tachinidae.
