= Fischeria =

Fischeria may refer to:

- Fischeria (fly), a genus of flies in the family Tachinidae
- Fischeria (plant), a genus of plants in the family Apocynaceae
- MV Fischeria, a ship
