= Dolichostoma =

Scientific classification
- Kingdom: Animalia
- Phylum: Arthropoda
- Class: Insecta
- Order: Diptera
- Family: Tachinidae
- Subfamily: Tachininae
- Tribe: Polideini
- Genus: Dolichostoma; Townsend, 1912

Type species
- Dolichostoma alpina Townsend, 1912

Synonyms
- Epidolichostoma Townsend, 1927; Erigonopsis Townsend, 1912

Genus of flies

Dolichostoma is a genus of flies in the family Tachinidae.

== Species ==
- Dolichostoma alpinum Townsend, 1912
- Dolichostoma andinum (Townsend, 1927)
- Dolichostoma arequipae (Townsend, 1912)
- Dolichostoma nigricaudum Blanchard, 1963
- Dolichostoma puntarenense (Townsend, 1928)
