= Siphoactia =

Scientific classification
- Kingdom: Animalia
- Phylum: Arthropoda
- Class: Insecta
- Order: Diptera
- Family: Tachinidae
- Subfamily: Tachininae
- Tribe: Leskiini
- Genus: Siphoactia; Townsend, 1927

Type species
- Siphoactia charapensis Townsend, 1927

Genus of insects

Siphoactia is a genus of parasitic flies in the family Tachinidae.

== Species ==
- Siphoactia charapensis Townsend, 1927
- Siphoactia peregrina Cortes & Campos, 1971
