= Mactomyia =

Scientific classification
- Kingdom: Animalia
- Phylum: Arthropoda
- Class: Insecta
- Order: Diptera
- Family: Tachinidae
- Subfamily: Tachininae
- Tribe: Polideini
- Genus: Mactomyia; Reinhard, 1958

Type species
- Mactomyia fracida Reinhard, 1958

Genus of flies

Mactomyia is a genus of flies in the family Tachinidae.

== Species ==
- Mactomyia fracida Reinhard, 1958

== Distribution ==
Canada, United States.
