= Homalactia =

Scientific classification
- Kingdom: Animalia
- Phylum: Arthropoda
- Clade: Pancrustacea
- Class: Insecta
- Order: Diptera
- Family: Tachinidae
- Subfamily: Tachininae
- Tribe: Polideini
- Genus: Homalactia; Townsend, 1915

Type species
- Exoristoides harringtoni Coquillett, 1902

Genus of flies

Homalactia is a genus of bristle flies in the family Tachinidae.

== Species ==
- Homalactia harringtoni (Coquillett, 1902)

== Distribution ==
Canada, United States.
