= Lophosiosoma =

Scientific classification
- Kingdom: Animalia
- Phylum: Arthropoda
- Class: Insecta
- Order: Diptera
- Family: Tachinidae
- Subfamily: Tachininae
- Tribe: Germariochaetini
- Genus: Lophosiosoma; Mesnil, 1973

Type species
- Lophosiosoma bicornis Mesnil, 1973

Genus of flies

Lophosiosoma is a genus of flies in the family Tachinidae.

== Species ==
- Lophosiosoma bicornis Mesnil, 1973
- Lophosiosoma javanum Crosskey, 1976
- Lophosiosoma obliteratum Crosskey, 1976
- Lophosiosoma rufofemoratum Crosskey, 1976
