= Crocinosoma =

Scientific classification
- Kingdom: Animalia
- Phylum: Arthropoda
- Class: Insecta
- Order: Diptera
- Family: Tachinidae
- Subfamily: Tachininae
- Tribe: Leskiini
- Genus: Crocinosoma; Reinhard, 1947

Type species
- Crocinosoma cornuale Reinhard, 1947

Genus of flies

Crocinosoma is a genus of flies in the family Tachinidae.

== Species ==
- Crocinosoma cornuale Reinhard, 1947
- Crocinosoma cornualis Reinhard, 1947
