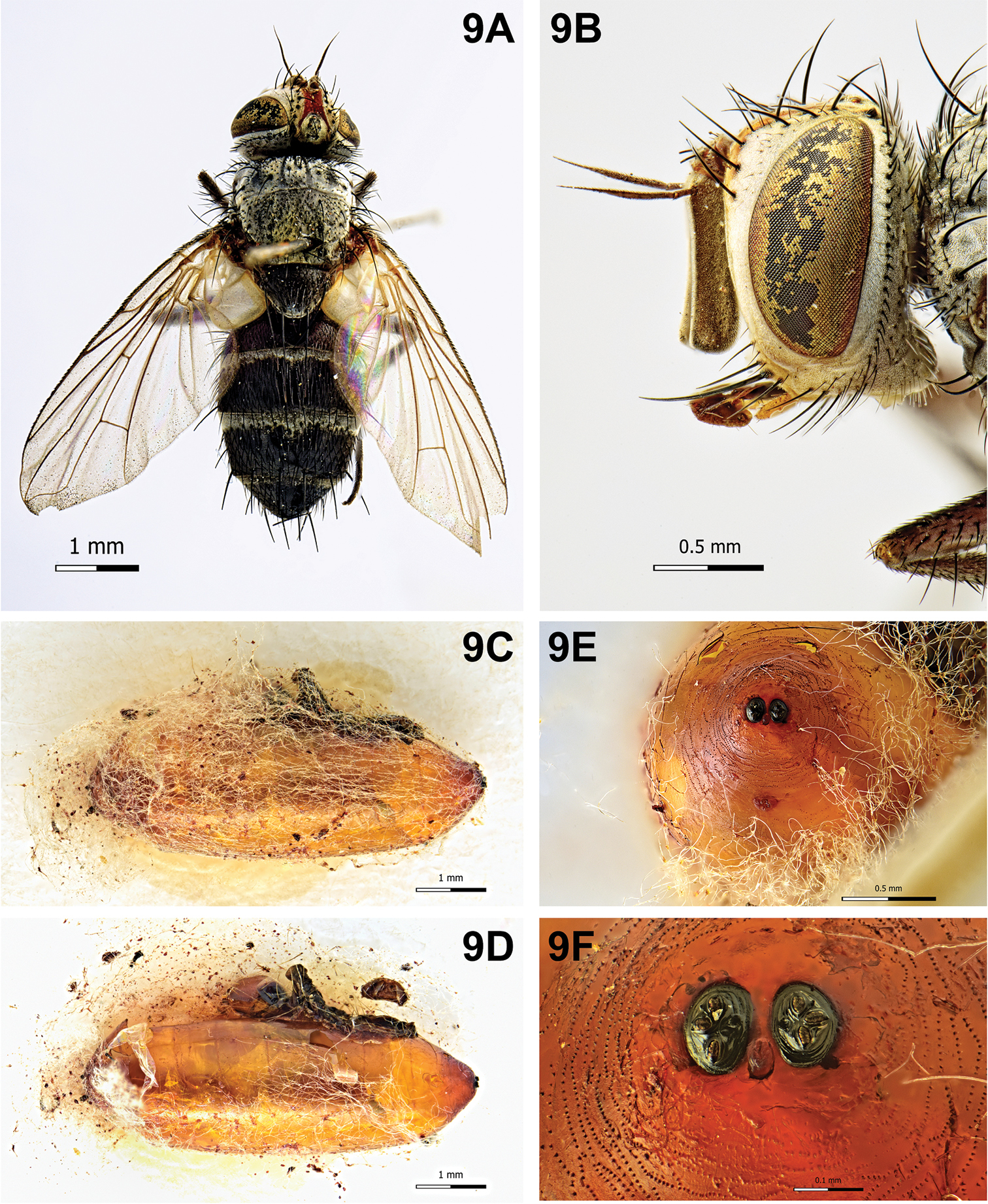
- Clausicella suturata

Scientific classification
- Kingdom: Animalia
- Phylum: Arthropoda
- Clade: Pancrustacea
- Class: Insecta
- Order: Diptera
- Family: Tachinidae
- Subfamily: Tachininae
- Tribe: Leskiini
- Genus: Clausicella; Rondani, 1856

Synonyms
- Coronimyia Townsend, 1892; Hasmica Richter, 1972; Histoglossa Scudder, 1882; Istoglossa Rondani, 1856; Siphoactia Townsend, 1927; Siphophyto Townsend, 1892

= Clausicella =

Genus of flies

Clausicella is a genus of flies in the family Tachinidae.

== Species ==
- Clausicella aurantiaca (Mesnil, 1973)
- Clausicella charapensis (Townsend, 1927)
- Clausicella floridensis (Townsend, 1892)
- Clausicella geniculata (Townsend, 1892)
- Clausicella melitarae (Reinhard, 1946)
- Clausicella molitor (Wiedemann, 1824)
- Clausicella neomexicana (Townsend, 1892)
- Clausicella opaca (Coquillett, 1895)
- Clausicella peregrina (Cortés & Campos, 1971)
- Clausicella politura (Reinhard, 1946)
- Clausicella puella (Rondani, 1856)
- Clausicella setigera (Coquillett, 1895)
- Clausicella solennis Richter, 1999
- Clausicella suturata Rondani, 1856
- Clausicella townsendi (Curran, 1931)
- Clausicella triangulifera Mesnil, 1963
- Clausicella turmalis (Reinhard, 1946)
- Clausicella xanthocera (Richter, 1972)
