= Micronychia (fly) =

Scientific classification
- Kingdom: Animalia
- Phylum: Arthropoda
- Class: Insecta
- Order: Diptera
- Family: Tachinidae
- Subfamily: Tachininae
- Tribe: Polideini
- Genus: Micronychia; Brauer & von Berganstamm, 1889

Type species
- Micronychia ruficauda Brauer & von Berganstamm, 1889

Synonyms
- Plagiosippus (Reinhard, 1962)

Genus of flies

Micronychia is a genus of flies in the family Tachinidae.

== Species ==
- Micronychia invasor (Reinhard, 1962)
- Micronychia maculipennis (Aldrich, 1926)
- Micronychia ruficauda (Zetterstedt, 1838)
- Micronychia woodi O'Hara, 2002
