= Obscuromyia =

Scientific classification
- Kingdom: Animalia
- Phylum: Arthropoda
- Clade: Pancrustacea
- Class: Insecta
- Order: Diptera
- Family: Tachinidae
- Subfamily: Tachininae
- Tribe: Myiotrixini
- Genus: Obscuromyia; Barraclough & O'Hara, 1998

Type species
- Obscuromyia westralica Barraclough & O'Hara 1998

Genus of flies

Obscuromyia is a genus of flies in the family Tachinidae.

== Species ==
- Obscuromyia westralica Barraclough & O'Hara, 1998

== Distribution ==
Western Australia
