= Parthenoleskia =

Scientific classification
- Kingdom: Animalia
- Phylum: Arthropoda
- Class: Insecta
- Order: Diptera
- Family: Tachinidae
- Subfamily: Tachininae
- Tribe: Leskiini
- Genus: Parthenoleskia; Townsend, 1941

Type species
- Parthenoleskia parkeri Townsend, 1941

Genus of flies

Parthenoleskia is a genus of flies in the family Tachinidae.

== Species ==
- Parthenoleskia parkeri Townsend, 1941

== Distribution ==
Brazil, Uruguay.
