= Trichoformosomyia =

Scientific classification
- Kingdom: Animalia
- Phylum: Arthropoda
- Class: Insecta
- Order: Diptera
- Family: Tachinidae
- Subfamily: Tachininae
- Tribe: Leskiini
- Genus: Trichoformosomyia; Baranov, 1934

Type species
- Trichoformosomyia sauteri Baranov, 1934

Synonyms
- Malaisimyia Mesnil, 1953

Genus of flies

Trichoformosomyia is a genus of flies in the family Tachinidae.

== Species ==
- Trichoformosomyia abbreviata Tachi, 2013
- Trichoformosomyia notata Richter, 1999
- Trichoformosomyia sauteri Baranov, 1934
