= Notoderus =

Scientific classification
- Kingdom: Animalia
- Phylum: Arthropoda
- Class: Insecta
- Order: Diptera
- Family: Tachinidae
- Subfamily: Tachininae
- Tribe: Polideini
- Genus: Notoderus; Cortés, 1986

Type species
- Notoderus maculatus Cortés, 1986

Genus of flies

Notoderus is a genus of flies in the family Tachinidae.

== Species ==
- Notoderus maculatus Cortés, 1986

== Distribution ==
Chile
