= Myobiomima =

Scientific classification
- Kingdom: Animalia
- Phylum: Arthropoda
- Class: Insecta
- Order: Diptera
- Family: Tachinidae
- Subfamily: Tachininae
- Tribe: Leskiini
- Genus: Myobiomima; Townsend, 1926

Type species
- Myobiomima longimana Townsend, 1926

Genus of flies

Myobiomima is a genus of flies in the family Tachinidae.

== Species ==
- Myobiomima longimana Townsend, 1926

== Distribution ==
Sumatera.
