= Spathipalpus =

Scientific classification
- Kingdom: Animalia
- Phylum: Arthropoda
- Class: Insecta
- Order: Diptera
- Family: Tachinidae
- Subfamily: Tachininae
- Tribe: Leskiini
- Genus: Spathipalpus; Rondani, 1863

Type species
- Spathipalpus philippii Rondani, 1863

Synonyms
- Spatipalpus Brauer & von Berganstamm, 1891; Thyreodontha Rondani, 1863

Genus of flies

Spathipalpus is a genus of flies in the family Tachinidae.

== Distribution ==
Argentina, Chile.

== Species ==
- Spathipalpus philippii Rondani, 1863
