= Exoernestia =

Scientific classification
- Kingdom: Animalia
- Phylum: Arthropoda
- Class: Insecta
- Order: Diptera
- Family: Tachinidae
- Subfamily: Tachininae
- Tribe: Polideini
- Genus: Exoernestia; Townsend, 1927

Type species
- Exoernestia uruhuasi Townsend, 1927

Genus of flies

Exoernestia is a genus of flies in the family Tachinidae.

== Species ==
- Exoernestia lluyi Townsend, 1929
- Exoernestia uruhuasi Townsend, 1927
