= Nigrilypha =

Scientific classification
- Kingdom: Animalia
- Phylum: Arthropoda
- Class: Insecta
- Order: Diptera
- Family: Tachinidae
- Subfamily: Tachininae
- Tribe: Polideini
- Genus: Nigrilypha; O'Hara, 2002

Type species
- Nigrilypha gnoma O'Hara, 2002

Genus of flies

Nigrilypha is a genus of flies in the family Tachinidae.

== Species ==
- Nigrilypha gnoma O'Hara, 2002

== Distribution ==
United States.
