= Chromatocera =

Scientific classification
- Kingdom: Animalia
- Phylum: Arthropoda
- Class: Insecta
- Order: Diptera
- Family: Tachinidae
- Subfamily: Tachininae
- Tribe: Polideini
- Genus: Chromatocera; Townsend, 1915

Type species
- Eulasiona setigena Coquillett, 1897

Genus of flies

Erviopsis is a genus of flies in the family Tachinidae.

== Species ==
- Chromatocera fumator Reinhard, 1962
- Chromatocera harrisi (Reinhard, 1935)
- Chromatocera setigena (Coquillett, 1897)
