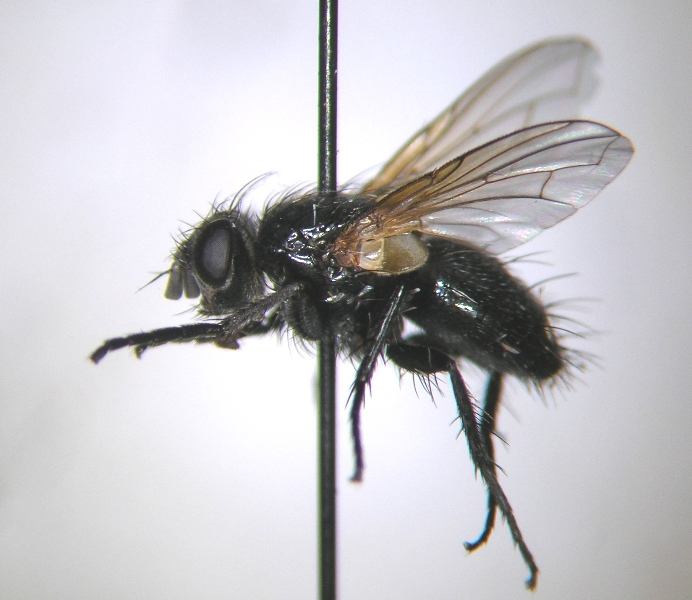
- Lydina aenea

Scientific classification
- Kingdom: Animalia
- Phylum: Arthropoda
- Class: Insecta
- Order: Diptera
- Family: Tachinidae
- Subfamily: Tachininae
- Tribe: Polideini
- Genus: Lydina; Robineau-Desvoidy, 1830

Type species
- Lydina nitida Robineau-Desvoidy, 1830

Synonyms
- Harrysia Rondani, 1865; Polidaria Curran, 1934; Polidea Macquart, 1848; Somoleja Rondani, 1865; Somoleya Rondani, 1868

= Lydina =

Genus of flies

Lydina is a genus of flies in the family Tachinidae.

== Species ==
- Lydina aenea (Meigen, 1824)
- Lydina americana (Townsend, 1892)
- Lydina areos (Walker, 1849)
- Lydina immista Reinhard, 1955
- Lydina polidoides (Townsend, 1892)
- Lydina ussuricola Richter, 1993
