= Thelairoleskia =

Scientific classification
- Kingdom: Animalia
- Phylum: Arthropoda
- Class: Insecta
- Order: Diptera
- Family: Tachinidae
- Subfamily: Tachininae
- Tribe: Leskiini
- Genus: Thelairoleskia; Townsend, 1926

Type species
- Thelairoleskia bicolor Townsend, 1926

Synonyms
- Proferia Mesnil, 1953; Proferia Mesnil, 1968

Genus of flies

Thelairoleskia is a genus of flies in the family Tachinidae.

== Species ==
- Thelairoleskia angustifrons (Mesnil, 1953)
- Thelairoleskia bicolor Townsend, 1926
- Thelairoleskia longicornis (Mesnil, 1953)
