= Germariochaeta =

Scientific classification
- Kingdom: Animalia
- Phylum: Arthropoda
- Class: Insecta
- Order: Diptera
- Family: Tachinidae
- Subfamily: Tachininae
- Tribe: Germariochaetini
- Genus: Germariochaeta; Villeneuve, 1937

Type species
- Germariochaeta clavata Villeneuve, 1937

Genus of flies

Germariochaeta is a genus of flies in the family Tachinidae.

== Species ==
- Germariochaeta clavata Villeneuve, 1937
