= Opsophasiopteryx =

Scientific classification
- Kingdom: Animalia
- Phylum: Arthropoda
- Class: Insecta
- Order: Diptera
- Family: Tachinidae
- Subfamily: Tachininae
- Tribe: Polideini
- Genus: Opsophasiopteryx; Townsend, 1917

Type species
- Opsophasiopteryx mima Townsend, 1917

Genus of flies

Opsophasiopteryx is a genus of flies in the family Tachinidae.

== Species ==
- Opsophasiopteryx mima Townsend, 1917

== Distribution ==
Brazil
