= Chlorohystricia =

Scientific classification
- Kingdom: Animalia
- Phylum: Arthropoda
- Class: Insecta
- Order: Diptera
- Family: Tachinidae
- Subfamily: Tachininae
- Tribe: Polideini
- Genus: Chlorohystricia; Townsend, 1927

Type species
- Chlorohystricia purpurea Townsend, 1927

Genus of flies

Chlorohystricia is a genus of flies in the family Tachinidae.

== Species ==
- Chlorohystricia cussiliris (Reinhard, 1953)
- Chlorohystricia cyaneiventris (Wulp, 1885)
- Chlorohystricia reinwardtii (Wiedemann, 1830)
