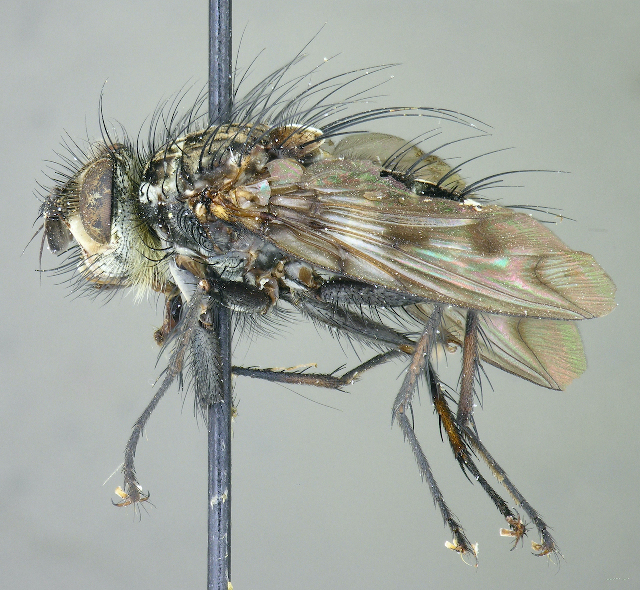

Scientific classification
- Kingdom: Animalia
- Phylum: Arthropoda
- Class: Insecta
- Order: Diptera
- Family: Tachinidae
- Subfamily: Tachininae
- Tribe: Polideini
- Genus: Mesembrierigone; Townsend, 1931

Type species
- Mesembrierigone alpina Townsend, 1931

= Mesembrierigone =

Genus of flies

Mesembrierigone is a genus of flies in the family of Tachinidae.

== Species ==
- Mesembrierigone alpina Townsend, 1931

== Distribution ==
Bolivia
