= Iceliopsis =

Scientific classification
- Kingdom: Animalia
- Phylum: Arthropoda
- Class: Insecta
- Order: Diptera
- Family: Tachinidae
- Subfamily: Tachininae
- Tribe: Iceliini
- Genus: Iceliopsis; Guimarães, 1976

Type species
- Iceliopsis borgmeieri Guimarães, 1976

Genus of flies

Iceliopsis is a genus of flies in the family Tachinidae.

== Species ==
- Iceliopsis borgmeieri Guimarães, 1976

== Distribution ==
Florida, Brazil.
