= Uruleskia =

Scientific classification
- Kingdom: Animalia
- Phylum: Arthropoda
- Class: Insecta
- Order: Diptera
- Family: Tachinidae
- Subfamily: Tachininae
- Tribe: Leskiini
- Genus: Uruleskia; Townsend, 1934

Type species
- Uruleskia aurescens Townsend, 1934

Genus of flies

Uruleskia is a genus of flies in the family Tachinidae.

== Species ==
- Uruleskia alba Nunez & Couri, 2012
- Uruleskia aurescens Townsend, 1934
- Uruleskia extremipilosa Nunez & Couri, 2012
- Uruleskia infima Nunez & Couri, 2012
- Uruleskia parcapilosa Nunez & Couri, 2012

== Distribution ==
Brazil
