= Phantasiomyia =

Scientific classification
- Kingdom: Animalia
- Phylum: Arthropoda
- Class: Insecta
- Order: Diptera
- Family: Tachinidae
- Subfamily: Tachininae
- Tribe: Leskiini
- Genus: Phantasiomyia; Townsend, 1915

Type species
- Phantasiomyia gracilis Townsend, 1915

Genus of flies

Phantasiomyia is a genus of flies in the family Tachinidae.

== Species ==
- Phantasiomyia atripes (Coquillett, 1897)
- Phantasiomyia gracilis Townsend, 1915
