= Euscopolia =

Scientific classification
- Kingdom: Animalia
- Phylum: Arthropoda
- Class: Insecta
- Order: Diptera
- Family: Tachinidae
- Subfamily: Tachininae
- Tribe: Polideini
- Genus: Euscopolia; Townsend, 1892

Type species
- Euscopolia dakotensis Townsend, 1892

Synonyms
- Politomyia Reinhard, 1935

Genus of flies

Euscopolia is a genus of flies in the family Tachinidae.

== Species ==
- Euscopolia dakotensis Townsend, 1892

== Distribution ==
Canada, United States.
