= Cyanoleskia =

Scientific classification
- Kingdom: Animalia
- Phylum: Arthropoda
- Class: Insecta
- Order: Diptera
- Family: Tachinidae
- Subfamily: Tachininae
- Tribe: Leskiini
- Genus: Cyanoleskia; Mesnil, 1978

Type species
- Cyanoleskia leucohalterata Mesnil, 1978

Genus of flies

Cyanoleskia is a genus of flies in the family Tachinidae.

== Species ==
- Cyanoleskia leucohalterata Mesnil, 1978

== Distribution ==
Madagascar.
