= Exechopalpus =

Scientific classification
- Kingdom: Animalia
- Phylum: Arthropoda
- Class: Insecta
- Order: Diptera
- Family: Tachinidae
- Subfamily: Tachininae
- Tribe: Leskiini
- Genus: Exechopalpus; Macquart, 1847

Type species
- Exechopalpus rufipalpus Macquart, 1847

Genus of flies

Exechopalpus is a genus of flies in the family Tachinidae.

== Species ==
- Exechopalpus dubitalis Malloch, 1930
- Exechopalpus fulvipes Malloch, 1930
- Exechopalpus nigripes Malloch, 1930
- Exechopalpus rufifemur Malloch, 1930
- Exechopalpus rufipalpus Macquart, 1847
