= Myiotrixini =

Scientific classification
- Kingdom: Animalia
- Phylum: Arthropoda
- Clade: Pancrustacea
- Class: Insecta
- Order: Diptera
- Family: Tachinidae
- Subfamily: Tachininae
- Tribe: Myiotrixini; Brauer & Bergenstamm, 1893

Tribe of flies

Myiotrixini is a tribe of flies in the family Tachinidae from Australia.

== Genera ==
- Myiotrixa Brauer & Bergenstamm, 1893
- Obscuromyia Barraclough & O'Hara, 1998
