= Toxocnemis =

Scientific classification
- Kingdom: Animalia
- Phylum: Arthropoda
- Clade: Pancrustacea
- Class: Insecta
- Order: Diptera
- Family: Tachinidae
- Subfamily: Tachininae
- Tribe: Leskiini
- Genus: Toxocnemis; Macquart, 1855

Type species
- Toxocnemis vittata Macquart, 1855

Genus of flies

Toxocnemis is a genus of flies in the family Tachinidae.

== Species ==
- Toxocnemis vittata Macquart, 1855

== Distribution ==
Australia.
