= Siphocrocuta =

Scientific classification
- Kingdom: Animalia
- Phylum: Arthropoda
- Class: Insecta
- Order: Diptera
- Family: Tachinidae
- Subfamily: Tachininae
- Tribe: Leskiini
- Genus: Siphocrocuta; Townsend, 1935

Type species
- Siphocrocuta trinidadensis Townsend, 1935

Genus of flies

Siphocrocuta is a genus of flies in the family Tachinidae.

== Species ==
- Siphocrocuta trinidadensis Townsend, 1935

== Distribution ==
Trinidad and Tobago.
