= Cavillatrix =

Scientific classification
- Kingdom: Animalia
- Phylum: Arthropoda
- Class: Insecta
- Order: Diptera
- Family: Tachinidae
- Subfamily: Tachininae
- Tribe: Leskiini
- Genus: Cavillatrix; Richter, 1986

Type species
- Cavillatrix calliphorina Richter, 1986

Genus of flies

Cavillatrix is a genus of flies in the family Tachinidae.

== Species ==
- Cavillatrix antennalis Shima, 1996
- Cavillatrix bukidnon Shima, 1996
- Cavillatrix calliphorina Richter, 1986
- Cavillatrix curtichela Shima, 1996
- Cavillatrix equatrialis Shima, 1996
- Cavillatrix fijiana Shima, 1996
- Cavillatrix gymnops Shima, 1996
- Cavillatrix intermedia Shima, 1996
- Cavillatrix luteipes Shima & Chao, 1992
- Cavillatrix palpis Shima, 1996
- Cavillatrix papuana Shima, 1996
- Cavillatrix similis Shima, 1996
