= Petagnia =

Scientific classification
- Kingdom: Animalia
- Phylum: Arthropoda
- Class: Insecta
- Order: Diptera
- Family: Tachinidae
- Subfamily: Tachininae
- Tribe: Polideini
- Genus: Petagnia; Rondani, 1856

Type species
- Petagnia occlusa Rondani, 1856

Genus of flies

Petagnia is a genus of flies in the family Tachinidae.

== Species ==
- Petagnia occlusa Rondani, 1856

== Distribution ==
Czech Republic, Poland, Bulgaria, Italy, Slovenia, Turkey, Austria, France, Switzerland, Transcaucasia.
