= Naira (fly) =

Scientific classification
- Kingdom: Animalia
- Phylum: Arthropoda
- Class: Insecta
- Order: Diptera
- Family: Tachinidae
- Subfamily: Tachininae
- Tribe: Leskiini
- Genus: Naira; Richter, 1970

Type species
- Naira nata Richter, 1970

Genus of flies

Naira is a genus of flies in the family Tachinidae.

== Species ==
- Naira montana Richter, 1972
- Naira nata Richter, 1970
