= Punamyia =

Scientific classification
- Kingdom: Animalia
- Phylum: Arthropoda
- Clade: Pancrustacea
- Class: Insecta
- Order: Diptera
- Family: Tachinidae
- Subfamily: Tachininae
- Tribe: Polideini
- Genus: Punamyia; Townsend, 1915

Type species
- Punamyia transitionalis Townsend, 1915

Genus of flies

Punamyia is a genus of flies in the family Tachinidae.

== Species ==
- Punamyia transitionalis Townsend, 1915

== Distribution ==
Peru
