= Pachycheta =

Scientific classification
- Kingdom: Animalia
- Phylum: Arthropoda
- Class: Insecta
- Order: Diptera
- Family: Tachinidae
- Subfamily: Tachininae
- Tribe: Polideini
- Genus: Pachycheta; Portschinsky, 1881

Type species
- Pachycheta jaroschewsky Portschinsky, 1881

Synonyms
- Pachychaeta Bezzi, 1906

Genus of flies

Pachycheta is a genus of flies in the family Tachinidae.

== Species ==
- Pachycheta caucasica (Richter, 1981)
- Pachycheta jaroschewsky Portschinsky, 1881
