= Erviopsis =

Scientific classification
- Kingdom: Animalia
- Phylum: Arthropoda
- Class: Insecta
- Order: Diptera
- Family: Tachinidae
- Subfamily: Tachininae
- Tribe: Iceliini
- Genus: Erviopsis; Townsend, 1934

Type species
- Erviopsis aurata Townsend, 1934

Genus of flies

Erviopsis is a genus of flies in the family Tachinidae.

== Species ==
- Erviopsis aurata Townsend, 1934

== Distribution ==
Brazil.
