= Nigara =

Scientific classification
- Kingdom: Animalia
- Phylum: Arthropoda
- Class: Insecta
- Order: Diptera
- Family: Tachinidae
- Subfamily: Tachininae
- Tribe: Leskiini
- Genus: Nigara; Richter, 1999

Type species
- Nigara gracilis Richter, 1999

Genus of flies

Nigara is a genus of flies in the family Tachinidae.

== Species ==
- Nigara gracilis Richter, 1999

== Distribution ==
South Korea, Russia.
