= Dichocera =

Scientific classification
- Kingdom: Animalia
- Phylum: Arthropoda
- Class: Insecta
- Order: Diptera
- Family: Tachinidae
- Subfamily: Tachininae
- Tribe: Polideini
- Genus: Dichocera; Williston, 1895

Type species
- Dichocera lyrata Williston, 1895

Synonyms
- Cacozelus Reinhard, 1943; Dichoceropsis Townsend, 1916; Metamyia Arnaud, 1963; Neodichocera Walton, 1914

Genus of flies

Dichocera is a genus of flies in the family Tachinidae. The genus Ceuthophilus is known to be a host of this parasitoid, possibly of the lyrata species.

== Species ==
- Dichocera auranticauda (Arnaud, 1963)
- Dichocera dichoceroides (Arnaud, 1963)
- Dichocera latifrons O'Hara, 2002
- Dichocera lyrata Williston, 1895
- Dichocera orientalis (Walton, 1914)
- Dichocera orientalis Coquillett, 1897
- Dichocera riederi (Reinhard, 1943)
- Dichocera robusta Brooks, 1945
