= Atylostoma =

Scientific classification
- Kingdom: Animalia
- Phylum: Arthropoda
- Class: Insecta
- Order: Diptera
- Family: Tachinidae
- Subfamily: Tachininae
- Tribe: Leskiini
- Genus: Atylostoma; Brauer & von Berganstamm, 1889

Type species
- Leskia tricolor Mik, 1884

Synonyms
- Aphrimyobia Townsend, 1926; Brachymeropsis Townsend, 1926; Chaetomyiobia Brauer & von Berganstamm, 1894

Genus of flies

Atylostoma is a genus of flies in the family Tachinidae.

== Species ==
- Atylostoma javanum (Brauer & von Berganstamm, 1894)
- Atylostoma towadense (Matsumura, 1916)
- Atylostoma tricolor (Mik, 1884)
