= Rhinomyobia =

Scientific classification
- Kingdom: Animalia
- Phylum: Arthropoda
- Clade: Pancrustacea
- Class: Insecta
- Order: Diptera
- Family: Tachinidae
- Subfamily: Tachininae
- Tribe: Leskiini
- Genus: Rhinomyobia; Brauer & von Berganstamm, 1893

Type species
- Rhinomyobia australis Brauer & von Berganstamm, 1893

Synonyms
- Rhinomyiobia Bezzi, 1928

Genus of flies

Rhinomyobia is a genus of flies in the family Tachinidae.

== Species ==
- Rhinomyobia australis Brauer & von Berganstamm, 1893

== Distribution ==
Australia.
