= Visayalydina =

Scientific classification
- Kingdom: Animalia
- Phylum: Arthropoda
- Class: Insecta
- Order: Diptera
- Family: Tachinidae
- Subfamily: Tachininae
- Tribe: Polideini
- Genus: Visayalydina; Townsend, 1926

Type species
- Visayalydina sierricola Townsend, 1926

Genus of flies

Visayalydina is a genus of flies in the family Tachinidae.

== Species ==
- Visayalydina sierricola Townsend, 1926

== Distribution ==
Mexico
