= Cololeskia =

Scientific classification
- Kingdom: Animalia
- Phylum: Arthropoda
- Class: Insecta
- Order: Diptera
- Family: Tachinidae
- Subfamily: Tachininae
- Tribe: Leskiini
- Genus: Cololeskia; Villeneuve, 1939

Type species
- Cololeskia pallida Villeneuve, 1939

Genus of flies

Cololeskia is a genus of flies in the family Tachinidae.

== Species ==
- Cololeskia pallida Villeneuve, 1939

== Distribution ==
Zimbabwe.
