= Oraeosoma =

Scientific classification
- Kingdom: Animalia
- Phylum: Arthropoda
- Class: Insecta
- Order: Diptera
- Family: Tachinidae
- Subfamily: Tachininae
- Tribe: Leskiini
- Genus: Oraeosoma; Cortés, 1976

Type species
- Oraeosoma proboscideum Cortés, 1976

Genus of flies

Oraeosoma is a genus of flies in the family Tachinidae.

== Species ==
- Oraeosoma proboscideum Cortés, 1976

== Distribution ==
Chile.
