= Ecuadorana =

Scientific classification
- Kingdom: Animalia
- Phylum: Arthropoda
- Class: Insecta
- Order: Diptera
- Family: Tachinidae
- Subfamily: Tachininae
- Tribe: Polideini
- Genus: Ecuadorana; Townsend, 1912

Type species
- Ecuadorana bicolor Townsend, 1912

Synonyms
- Eucadorana Rathbun, 1913

Genus of flies

Ecuadorana is a genus of flies in the family Tachinidae.

== Species ==
- Ecuadorana bicolor Townsend, 1912

== Distribution ==
Ecuador.
