= Austrosolieria =

Scientific classification
- Kingdom: Animalia
- Phylum: Arthropoda
- Class: Insecta
- Order: Diptera
- Family: Tachinidae
- Subfamily: Tachininae
- Tribe: Leskiini
- Genus: Austrosolieria; Cerretti & O'Hara, 2016

Type species
- Austrosolieria londti Cerretti & O'Hara, 2016

Genus of flies

Austrosolieria is a genus of flies in the family Tachinidae.

== Species ==
- Austrosolieria freidbergi Cerretti & O'Hara, 2016
- Austrosolieria londti Cerretti & O'Hara, 2016
