= Apatemyia =

Scientific classification
- Kingdom: Animalia
- Phylum: Arthropoda
- Clade: Pancrustacea
- Class: Insecta
- Order: Diptera
- Family: Tachinidae
- Subfamily: Tachininae
- Tribe: Leskiini
- Genus: Apatemyia; Macquart, 1846

Synonyms
- Anastellorhina Bigot, 1885

Genus of flies

Apatemyia is a genus of flies in the family Tachinidae.

== Species ==
- Apatemyia bicolor (Bigot, 1885)
- Apatemyia flavipes (Macquart, 1851)
- Apatemyia longipes Macquart, 1846
