= Chromatocera setigena =

Scientific classification
- Domain: Eukaryota
- Kingdom: Animalia
- Phylum: Arthropoda
- Class: Insecta
- Order: Diptera
- Family: Tachinidae
- Genus: Chromatocera
- Species: C. setigena

Binomial name
- Chromatocera setigena (Coquillett, 1897)

Synonyms
- Eulasiona setigena Coquillett, 1897

Species of fly

Chromatocera setigena is a species of bristle fly in the family Tachinidae.
