= Germariochaetini =

Scientific classification
- Kingdom: Animalia
- Phylum: Arthropoda
- Class: Insecta
- Order: Diptera
- Family: Tachinidae
- Subfamily: Tachininae
- Tribe: Germariochaetini

Tribe of flies

Germariochaetini is a tribe of flies in the family Tachinidae.

== Genera ==
- Germariochaeta Villeneuve, 1937
- Lophosiosoma Mesnil, 1973
