= Prodemoticus =

Scientific classification
- Kingdom: Animalia
- Phylum: Arthropoda
- Class: Insecta
- Order: Diptera
- Family: Tachinidae
- Subfamily: Tachininae
- Tribe: Leskiini
- Genus: Prodemoticus; Villeneuve, 1919

Type species
- Prodemoticus orientalis Villeneuve, 1919

Genus of flies

Prodemoticus is a genus of flies in the family Tachinidae.

== Species ==
- Prodemoticus moderatus Kugler, 1980
- Prodemoticus orientalis Villeneuve, 1919
