= Iceliini =

Scientific classification
- Kingdom: Animalia
- Phylum: Arthropoda
- Class: Insecta
- Order: Diptera
- Family: Tachinidae
- Subfamily: Tachininae
- Tribe: Iceliini

Tribe of flies

Iceliini is a tribe of flies in the family Tachinidae.

== Genera ==
- Erviopsis Townsend, 1934
- Icelia Robineau-Desvoidy, 1830
- Iceliopsis Guimarães, 1976
