= Ocypteromima =

Scientific classification
- Kingdom: Animalia
- Phylum: Arthropoda
- Class: Insecta
- Order: Diptera
- Family: Tachinidae
- Subfamily: Tachininae
- Tribe: Leskiini
- Genus: Ocypteromima; Townsend, 1916

Type species
- Ocypteromima polita Townsend, 1916

Synonyms
- Asboleola Villeneuve, 1916; Minthocyptera Townsend, 1926; Orilliopsis Townsend, 1928; Pyrrhosiella Villeneuve, 1916

Genus of flies

Ocypteromima is a genus of flies in the family Tachinidae.

== Species ==
- Ocypteromima angustipennis (Villeneuve, 1916)
- Ocypteromima elegans (Villeneuve, 1916)
- Ocypteromima malaya (Townsend, 1926)
- Ocypteromima orientalis (Townsend, 1928)
- Ocypteromima polita Townsend, 1916
