= Desantisodes =

Scientific classification
- Kingdom: Animalia
- Phylum: Arthropoda
- Clade: Pancrustacea
- Class: Insecta
- Order: Diptera
- Family: Tachinidae
- Subfamily: Tachininae
- Tribe: Polideini
- Genus: Desantisodes; Cortés, 1973

Type species
- Desantisodes concinnum Cortés, 1973

Genus of flies

Desantisodes is a genus of flies in the family Tachinidae.

== Species ==
- Desantisodes concinnum Cortés, 1973

== Distribution ==
Argentina, Chile.
