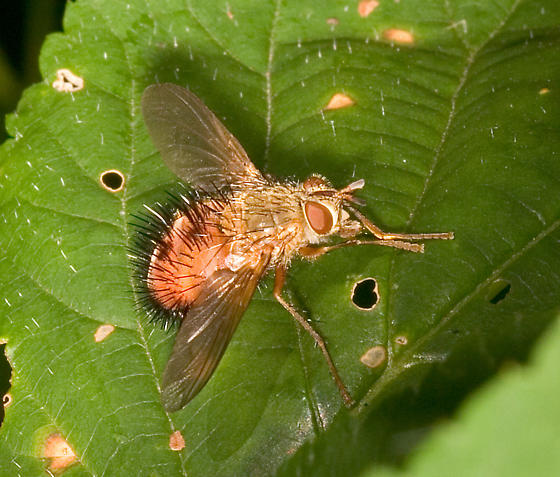
- Hystricia abrupta

Scientific classification
- Kingdom: Animalia
- Phylum: Arthropoda
- Class: Insecta
- Order: Diptera
- Family: Tachinidae
- Subfamily: Tachininae
- Tribe: Polideini
- Genus: Hystricia; Macquart, 1844

Type species
- Hystricia amoena Macquart, 1844

Synonyms
- Bombyliopsis Townsend, 1915; Engelomyia Townsend, 1931; Hystriciopsis Townsend, 1914

= Hystricia =

Genus of flies

Hystricia is a genus of flies in the family Tachinidae.

== Species ==
- Hystricia abrupta (Wiedemann, 1830)
- Hystricia albimana Curran, 1942
- Hystricia amoena Macquart, 1844
- Hystricia argentinensis (Blanchard, 1941)
- Hystricia browni Curran, 1942
- Hystricia caliginosa (Walker, 1853)
- Hystricia condor Curran, 1942
- Hystricia currani O'Hara, 2002
- Hystricia flavitibia Curran, 1942
- Hystricia humeralis Curran, 1942
- Hystricia laxa Curran, 1942
- Hystricia micans Wulp, 1888
- Hystricia nigroscutata Rondani, 1863
- Hystricia nigrotibiata Curran, 1942
- Hystricia obesa Engel, 1920
- Hystricia palpina Rondani, 1851
- Hystricia rufipes Macquart, 1851
- Hystricia rufohirta (Engel, 1920)
- Hystricia rufohirta Curran, 1942
- Hystricia testacea Macquart, 1844
- Hystricia testaceiventris Wulp, 1892
- Hystricia vargas Curran, 1942
- Hystricia vultur Curran, 1942
