= Stomatodexia =

Scientific classification
- Kingdom: Animalia
- Phylum: Arthropoda
- Class: Insecta
- Order: Diptera
- Family: Tachinidae
- Subfamily: Tachininae
- Tribe: Leskiini
- Genus: Stomatodexia; Brauer & von Berganstamm, 1889

Type species
- Stomoxys cothurnata Wiedemann, 1830

Synonyms
- Eustomatodexia Townsend, 1892

Genus of flies

Stomatodexia is a genus of flies in the family Tachinidae.

== Species ==
- Stomatodexia cothurnata (Wiedemann, 1830)
- Stomatodexia longitarsis (Macquart, 1844)
- Stomatodexia maculifera (Bigot, 1889)
- Stomatodexia obscura (Walker, 1853)
- Stomatodexia quadrimaculata (Walker, 1853)
- Stomatodexia similigena Wulp, 1891
- Stomatodexia tinctisquamae Curran, 1926
