= Trochiloglossa =

Scientific classification
- Kingdom: Animalia
- Phylum: Arthropoda
- Class: Insecta
- Order: Diptera
- Family: Tachinidae
- Subfamily: Tachininae
- Tribe: Leskiini
- Genus: Trochiloglossa; Townsend, 1919

Type species
- Trochiloglossa tropica Townsend, 1919

Genus of flies

Trochiloglossa is a genus of flies in the family Tachinidae.

== Species ==
- Trochiloglossa aurea Thompson, 1963
- Trochiloglossa tropica Townsend, 1919
