= Myiotrixa =

Scientific classification
- Kingdom: Animalia
- Phylum: Arthropoda
- Clade: Pancrustacea
- Class: Insecta
- Order: Diptera
- Family: Tachinidae
- Subfamily: Tachininae
- Tribe: Myiotrixini
- Genus: Myiotrixa; Brauer & von Berganstamm, 1893

Type species
- Myiotrixa prosopina Brauer & von Berganstamm, 1893

Genus of flies

Myiotrixa is a genus of flies in the family Tachinidae.

== Species ==
- Myiotrixa prosopina Brauer & von Berganstamm, 1893

== Distribution ==
New South Wales, Queensland.
