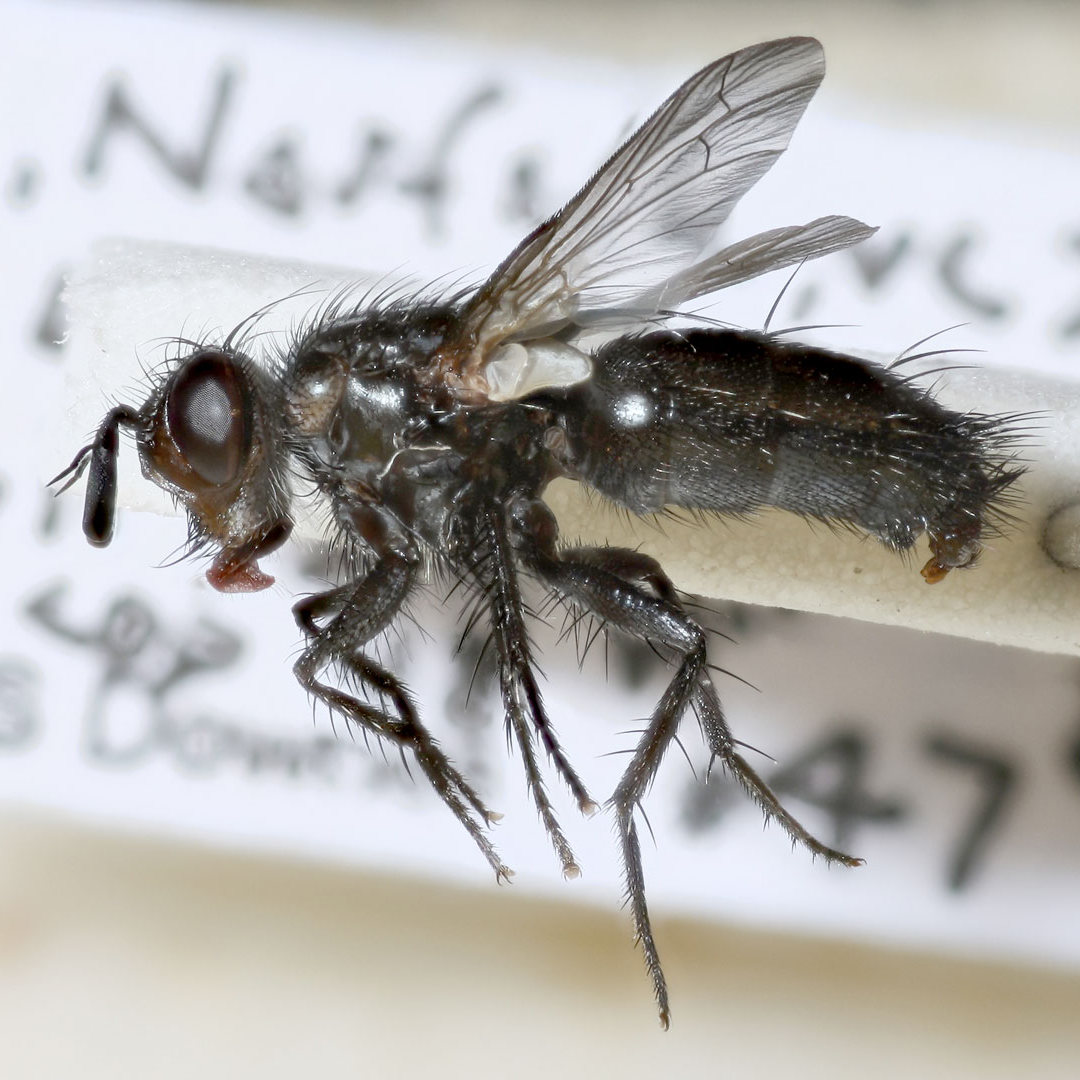
- Germaria angustata

Scientific classification
- Kingdom: Animalia
- Phylum: Arthropoda
- Class: Insecta
- Order: Diptera
- Family: Tachinidae
- Subfamily: Tachininae
- Tribe: Germariini
- Genus: Germaria; Robineau-Desvoidy, 1830

Type species
- Germaria latifrons Robineau-Desvoidy, 1830

Synonyms
- Atractochaeta Brauer, 1893; Atractogonia Townsend, 1932; Germarina Mesnil, 1963; Illigera Meigen, 1838

= Germaria =

Genus of flies

Germaria is a genus of flies in the family Tachinidae.

== Species ==
- Germaria angustata (Zetterstedt, 1844)
- Germaria barbara Mesnil, 1963
- Germaria caelestis Ziegler, 2015
- Germaria expectata Ziegler, 2015
- Germaria graeca (Brauer & von Berganstamm, 1889)
- Germaria hermonensis Kugler, 1980
- Germaria hispanica Mesnil, 1963
- Germaria nudinerva Mesnil, 1963
- Germaria obscuripennis Tschorsnig, 2000
- Germaria ruficeps (Fallén, 1820)
- Germaria sesiophaga Richter, 1987
- Germaria vicina Mesnil, 1963
- Germaria violaceiventris Enderlein, 1934
