= Urumyobia =

Scientific classification
- Kingdom: Animalia
- Phylum: Arthropoda
- Class: Insecta
- Order: Diptera
- Family: Tachinidae
- Subfamily: Tachininae
- Tribe: Leskiini
- Genus: Urumyobia; Townsend, 1934

Type species
- Urumyobia aurata Townsend, 1934

Genus of flies

Urumyobia is a genus of flies in the family Tachinidae.

== Species ==
- Urumyobia aurata Townsend, 1934

== Distribution ==
Brazil.
