= Andicesa =

Scientific classification
- Kingdom: Animalia
- Phylum: Arthropoda
- Class: Insecta
- Order: Diptera
- Family: Tachinidae
- Subfamily: Tachininae
- Tribe: Polideini
- Genus: Andicesa; Koçak & Kemal, 2010

Type species
- Trichophoropsis puna Townsend, 1914

Synonyms
- Trichophoropsis Townsend, 1914; Trichophoropsis Townsend, 1914; Anicesa Koçak & Kemal, 2010

Genus of flies

Andicesa is a genus of flies in the family Tachinidae.

== Species ==
- Andicesa bicolor (González, 1992)
- Andicesa coscaroni (González, 1992)
- Andicesa nitens (Townsend, 1914)
- Andicesa puna (Townsend, 1914)
- Andicesa sabroskyi (Cortés & Campos, 1971)
