= Mauromyia =

Scientific classification
- Kingdom: Animalia
- Phylum: Arthropoda
- Class: Insecta
- Order: Diptera
- Family: Tachinidae
- Subfamily: Tachininae
- Tribe: Polideini
- Genus: Mauromyia; Coquillett, 1897

Type species
- Mauromyia pulla Coquillett, 1897

Synonyms
- Jalapamyia Reinhard, 1964; Paradmontia Coquillett, 1902

Genus of flies

Mauromyia is a genus of flies in the family Tachinidae.

== Species ==
- Mauromyia brevis (Coquillett, 1902)
- Mauromyia callitris (Reinhard, 1964)
- Mauromyia finitima Reinhard, 1967
- Mauromyia macrobrevis O'Hara, 2002
- Mauromyia picticornis (Reinhard, 1967)
- Mauromyia pulla Coquillett, 1897
