= Tipuloleskia =

Scientific classification
- Kingdom: Animalia
- Phylum: Arthropoda
- Class: Insecta
- Order: Diptera
- Family: Tachinidae
- Subfamily: Tachininae
- Tribe: Leskiini
- Genus: Tipuloleskia; Townsend, 1931

Type species
- Tipuloleskia mima Townsend, 1931

Genus of flies

Tipuloleskia is a genus of flies in the family Tachinidae.

== Species ==
- Tipuloleskia mima Townsend, 1931

== Distribution ==
Brazil
