= Beskioleskia =

Scientific classification
- Kingdom: Animalia
- Phylum: Arthropoda
- Clade: Pancrustacea
- Class: Insecta
- Order: Diptera
- Family: Tachinidae
- Subfamily: Tachininae
- Tribe: Leskiini
- Genus: Beskioleskia; Townsend, 1919

Type species
- Beskioleskia busckii Townsend, 1919

Genus of flies

Beskioleskia is a genus of flies in the family Tachinidae.

== Species ==
- Beskioleskia busckii Townsend, 1919

== Distribution ==
Panama
