= Drepanoglossa =

Scientific classification
- Kingdom: Animalia
- Phylum: Arthropoda
- Clade: Pancrustacea
- Class: Insecta
- Order: Diptera
- Family: Tachinidae
- Subfamily: Tachininae
- Tribe: Leskiini
- Genus: Drepanoglossa; Townsend, 1891

Type species
- Drepanoglossa lucens Townsend, 1891

Synonyms
- Evanalia Strickland, 1941; Philocalia Reinhard, 1939

Genus of flies

Drepanoglossa is a genus of flies in the family Tachinidae.

== Species ==
- Drepanoglossa amydriae Townsend, 1908
- Drepanoglossa lucens Townsend, 1891
- Drepanoglossa tenuirostris (Reinhard, 1939)
