= Metallicomyia =

Scientific classification
- Kingdom: Animalia
- Phylum: Arthropoda
- Class: Insecta
- Order: Diptera
- Family: Tachinidae
- Subfamily: Tachininae
- Genus: Metallicomyia; Röder, 1886

Type species
- Chalcomyia elegans Röder, 1886

Synonyms
- Chalcomyia Röder, 1886

Genus of flies

Metallicomyia is a genus of flies in the family Tachinidae.

== Species ==
- Metallicomyia elegans (Röder, 1886)

== Distribution ==
Ecuador.
