= Epicoronimyia =

Scientific classification
- Kingdom: Animalia
- Phylum: Arthropoda
- Clade: Pancrustacea
- Class: Insecta
- Order: Diptera
- Family: Tachinidae
- Subfamily: Tachininae
- Tribe: Leskiini
- Genus: Epicoronimyia; Blanchard, 1940

Type species
- Epigrymyia mundelli Blanchard, 1935

Genus of flies

Epicoronimyia is a genus of flies in the family Tachinidae.

== Species ==
- Epicoronimyia mundelli (Blanchard, 1935)

== Distribution ==
Argentina, Chile.
