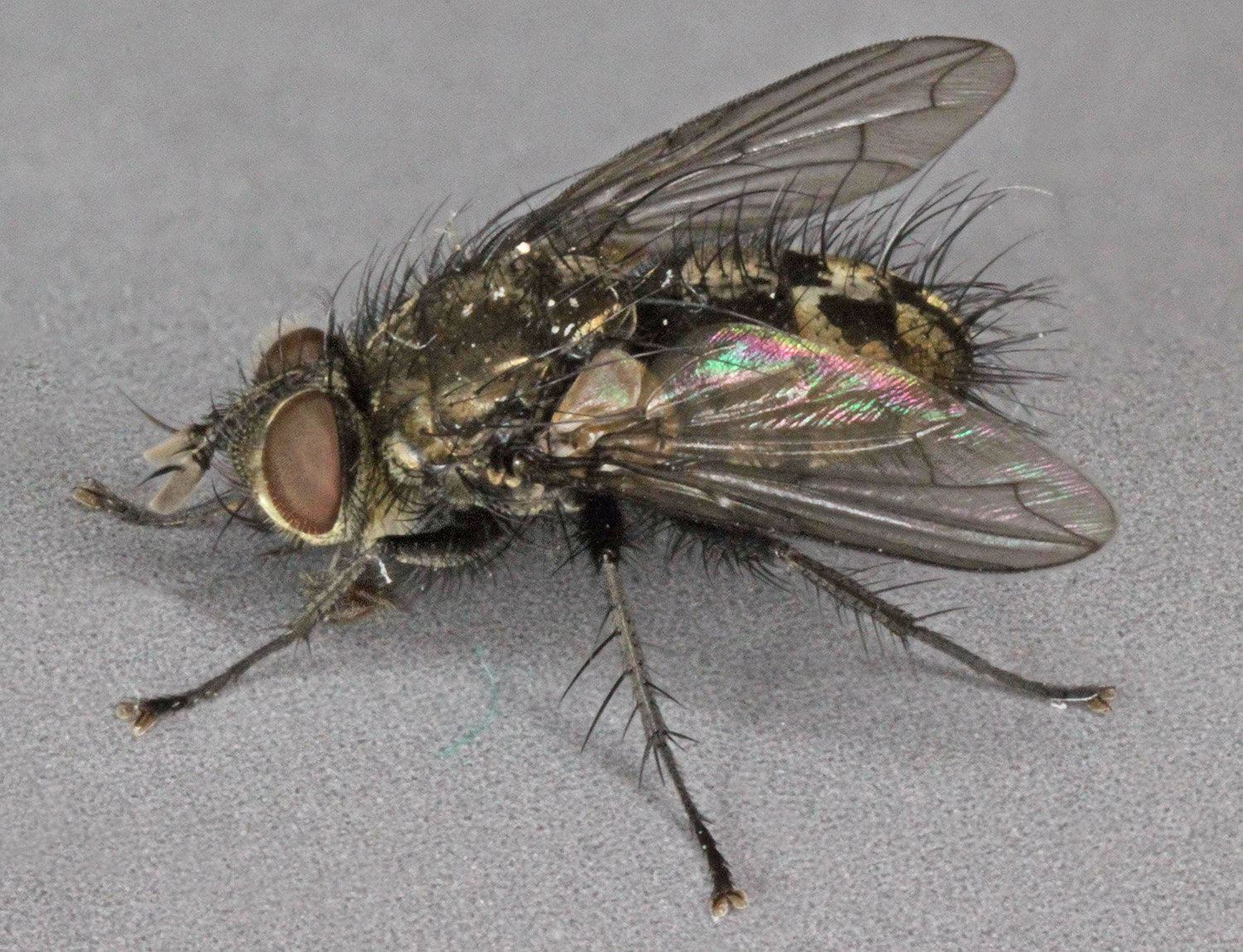
- Lypha dubia

Scientific classification
- Kingdom: Animalia
- Phylum: Arthropoda
- Clade: Pancrustacea
- Class: Insecta
- Order: Diptera
- Family: Tachinidae
- Subfamily: Tachininae
- Tribe: Polideini
- Genus: Lypha; Robineau-Desvoidy, 1830

Type species
- Tachina dubia Fallén, 1810

Synonyms
- Aporomya Rondani, 1859; Enthenis Robineau-Desvoidy, 1863; Lyphe Coquillett, 1910

= Lypha =

Genus of flies

Lypha is a genus of flies in the family Tachinidae.

== Species ==
- Lypha amazonica (Townsend, 1934)
- Lypha angolensis Aldrich, 1934
- Lypha brimleyi (Curran, 1926)
- Lypha chaetosa Aldrich, 1934
- Lypha corax Aldrich, 1934
- Lypha dubia (Fallén, 1810)
- Lypha edwardsi Aldrich, 1934
- Lypha facula (Reinhard, 1959)
- Lypha frontalis Brooks, 1945
- Lypha fumator (Reinhard, 1962)
- Lypha fumipennis Brooks, 1945
- Lypha harringtoni (Coquillett, 1902)
- Lypha harrisi (Reinhard, 1935)
- Lypha invasor (Reinhard, 1962)
- Lypha johnsoni (Coquillett, 1897)
- Lypha liturata Aldrich, 1934
- Lypha longicornis Aldrich, 1934
- Lypha melobosis (Walker, 1849)
- Lypha nivalis Herting, 1973
- Lypha noctifer Aldrich, 1934
- Lypha orbitalis Aldrich, 1934
- Lypha ornata Aldrich, 1934
- Lypha parva Brooks, 1945
- Lypha setifacies (West, 1925)
- Lypha setigena (Coquillett, 1897)
- Lypha slossonae (Coquillett, 1897)
- Lypha triangulifera (Jacobs, 1900)
- Lypha truncata Aldrich, 1934
- Lypha urichi (Aldrich, 1932)
- Lypha vestita Richter, 1999
