= Ollacheryphe =

Scientific classification
- Kingdom: Animalia
- Phylum: Arthropoda
- Class: Insecta
- Order: Diptera
- Family: Tachinidae
- Subfamily: Tachininae
- Tribe: Polideini
- Genus: Ollacheryphe; Townsend, 1927

Type species
- Ollacheryphe facialis Townsend, 1927

Synonyms
- Aeglops Aldrich, 1934

Genus of flies

Ollacheryphe is a genus of flies in the family Tachinidae.

== Species ==
- Ollacheryphe aenea (Aldrich, 1934)
- Ollacheryphe facialis Townsend, 1927
