= Oxymedoria =

Scientific classification
- Kingdom: Animalia
- Phylum: Arthropoda
- Class: Insecta
- Order: Diptera
- Family: Tachinidae
- Subfamily: Tachininae
- Tribe: Leskiini
- Genus: Oxymedoria; Villeneuve, 1916

Type species
- Oxymedoria palpata Villeneuve, 1916

Genus of flies

Oxymedoria is a genus of flies in the family Tachinidae.

== Species ==
- Oxymedoria palpata Villeneuve, 1916

== Distribution ==
Nigeria.
