= Ostracophyto =

Scientific classification
- Kingdom: Animalia
- Phylum: Arthropoda
- Class: Insecta
- Order: Diptera
- Family: Tachinidae
- Subfamily: Tachininae
- Tribe: Polideini
- Genus: Ostracophyto; Townsend, 1915

Type species
- Ostracophyto aristalis Townsend, 1915

Genus of flies

Ostracophyto is a genus of flies in the family Tachinidae.

== Species ==
- Ostracophyto aristalis Townsend, 1915
- Ostracophyto flavicaudalis O'Hara, 2002
