= Tarpessita =

Scientific classification
- Kingdom: Animalia
- Phylum: Arthropoda
- Class: Insecta
- Order: Diptera
- Family: Tachinidae
- Subfamily: Tachininae
- Tribe: Polideini
- Genus: Tarpessita; Reinhard, 1967

Type species
- Tarpessita fulgens Reinhard, 1967

Genus of flies

Tarpessita is a genus of flies in the family Tachinidae.

== Species ==
- Tarpessita fulgens Reinhard, 1967

== Distribution ==
Colombia
