= Eucheirophaga =

Scientific classification
- Kingdom: Animalia
- Phylum: Arthropoda
- Clade: Pancrustacea
- Class: Insecta
- Order: Diptera
- Family: Tachinidae
- Subfamily: Tachininae
- Tribe: Polideini
- Genus: Eucheirophaga; James, 1945

Type species
- Eucheirophaga lugubris James, 1945

Genus of flies

Eucheirophaga is a genus of flies in the family Tachinidae.

== Species ==
- Eucheirophaga lugubris James, 1945

== Distribution ==
The genus can be found in Mexico.
