= Ginglymia =

Scientific classification
- Kingdom: Animalia
- Phylum: Arthropoda
- Class: Insecta
- Order: Diptera
- Family: Tachinidae
- Subfamily: Tachininae
- Tribe: Leskiini
- Genus: Ginglymia; Townsend, 1892

Type species
- Ginglymia acrirostris Townsend, 1892

Synonyms
- Ginglimyia Curran, 1934; Ginglymyia Coquillett, 1910; Lasioneura Coquillett, 1895

Genus of flies

Ginglymia is a genus of flies in the family Tachinidae.

== Species ==
- Ginglymia acrirostris Townsend, 1892
- Ginglymia devia Reinhard, 1962
- Ginglymia dextella (Reinhard, 1953)
- Ginglymia fracida Reinhard, 1962
- Ginglymia johnsoni (Coquillett, 1895)
