= Trochiloleskia =

Scientific classification
- Kingdom: Animalia
- Phylum: Arthropoda
- Class: Insecta
- Order: Diptera
- Family: Tachinidae
- Subfamily: Tachininae
- Tribe: Leskiini
- Genus: Trochiloleskia; Townsend, 1917

Type species
- Trochiloleskia flava Townsend, 1917

Genus of flies

Trochiloleskia is a genus of flies in the family Tachinidae.

== Species ==
- Trochiloleskia flava Townsend, 1917
- Trochiloleskia loriola (Reinhard, 1955)
