= Oxyphyllomyia =

Scientific classification
- Kingdom: Animalia
- Phylum: Arthropoda
- Class: Insecta
- Order: Diptera
- Family: Tachinidae
- Subfamily: Tachininae
- Tribe: Leskiini
- Genus: Oxyphyllomyia; Villeneuve, 1937

Type species
- Oxyphyllomyia cordylurina Villeneuve, 1937

Genus of flies

Oxyphyllomyia is a genus of flies in the family Tachinidae.

== Species ==
- Oxyphyllomyia alticola Shima, 1983
- Oxyphyllomyia cordylurina Villeneuve, 1937
