= Leskiola =

Scientific classification
- Kingdom: Animalia
- Phylum: Arthropoda
- Class: Insecta
- Order: Diptera
- Family: Tachinidae
- Subfamily: Tachininae
- Tribe: Leskiini
- Genus: Leskiola; Mesnil, 1957

Type species
- Leskiola palpata Mesnil, 1957

Genus of flies

Leskiola is a genus of flies in the family Tachinidae.

== Species ==
- Leskiola asiatica (Mesnil, 1957)
- Leskiola palpata Mesnil, 1957

== Distribution ==
Myanmar
