= Demoticoides =

Scientific classification
- Kingdom: Animalia
- Phylum: Arthropoda
- Class: Insecta
- Order: Diptera
- Family: Tachinidae
- Subfamily: Tachininae
- Tribe: Leskiini
- Genus: Demoticoides; Mesnil, 1953

Type species
- Demoticoides pallidus Mesnil, 1953

Genus of flies

Demoticoides is a genus of flies in the family Tachinidae.

== Species ==
- Demoticoides pallidus Mesnil, 1953

== Distribution ==
China, Japan, Russia, India, Indonesia, Malaysia, Australia, New Caledonia.
