= Fischeria (fly) =

Scientific classification
- Kingdom: Animalia
- Phylum: Arthropoda
- Class: Insecta
- Order: Diptera
- Family: Tachinidae
- Subfamily: Tachininae
- Tribe: Leskiini
- Genus: Fischeria; Robineau-Desvoidy, 1830

Synonyms
- Fisceria Rondani, 1856; Proboscista Rondani, 1861

Genus of flies

Fischeria is a genus of flies in the family Tachinidae.

== Species ==
- Fischeria bicolor Robineau-Desvoidy, 1830

== Distribution ==
Tajikistan, China, Romania, Croatia, Italy, Macedonia, Malta, France, Iran, Israel, Palestine, Saudi Arabia, Transcaucasia.
