= Chrysotachina =

Scientific classification
- Kingdom: Animalia
- Phylum: Arthropoda
- Class: Insecta
- Order: Diptera
- Family: Tachinidae
- Subfamily: Tachininae
- Tribe: Polideini
- Genus: Chrysotachina; Brauer & von Berganstamm, 1889

Synonyms
- Chrysoerigone Townsend, 1927; Eugymnochaeta Townsend, 1912; Exoristopsis Townsend, 1915; Helioplagia Townsend, 1934; Mericina Curran, 1927; Neoerigone Townsend, 1919; Paragymnochaeta Townsend, 1915

Genus of flies

Chrysotachina is a genus of flies in the family Tachinidae.

== Species ==
- Chrysotachina alcedo (Loew, 1869)
- Chrysotachina aldrichi Nunez, Couri & Guimarães, 2002
- Chrysotachina auriceps O'Hara, 2002
- Chrysotachina braueri Townsend, 1931
- Chrysotachina cinerea (Townsend, 1919)
- Chrysotachina cristiverpa (O'Hara, 2002)
- Chrysotachina currani Nunez, Couri & Guimarães, 2002
- Chrysotachina erythrostoma Nunez, Couri & Guimarães, 2002
- Chrysotachina infrequens O'Hara, 2002
- Chrysotachina longipennis O'Hara, 2002
- Chrysotachina ornata (Townsend, 1927)
- Chrysotachina panamensis Curran, 1939
- Chrysotachina peruviana Curran, 1939
- Chrysotachina purpurea Curran, 1939
- Chrysotachina ruficauda (Curran, 1927)
- Chrysotachina setifera (Townsend, 1915)
- Chrysotachina subviridis (Wulp, 1892)
- Chrysotachina tatei Curran, 1939
- Chrysotachina tieta Nunez, Couri & Guimarães, 2002
- Chrysotachina townsendi Curran, 1939
- Chrysotachina tropicalis Nunez, Couri & Guimarães, 2002
- Chrysotachina verticalis (Reinhard, 1935)
- Chrysotachina viridis Nunez, Couri & Guimarães, 2002
- Chrysotachina willistoni Curran, 1939
