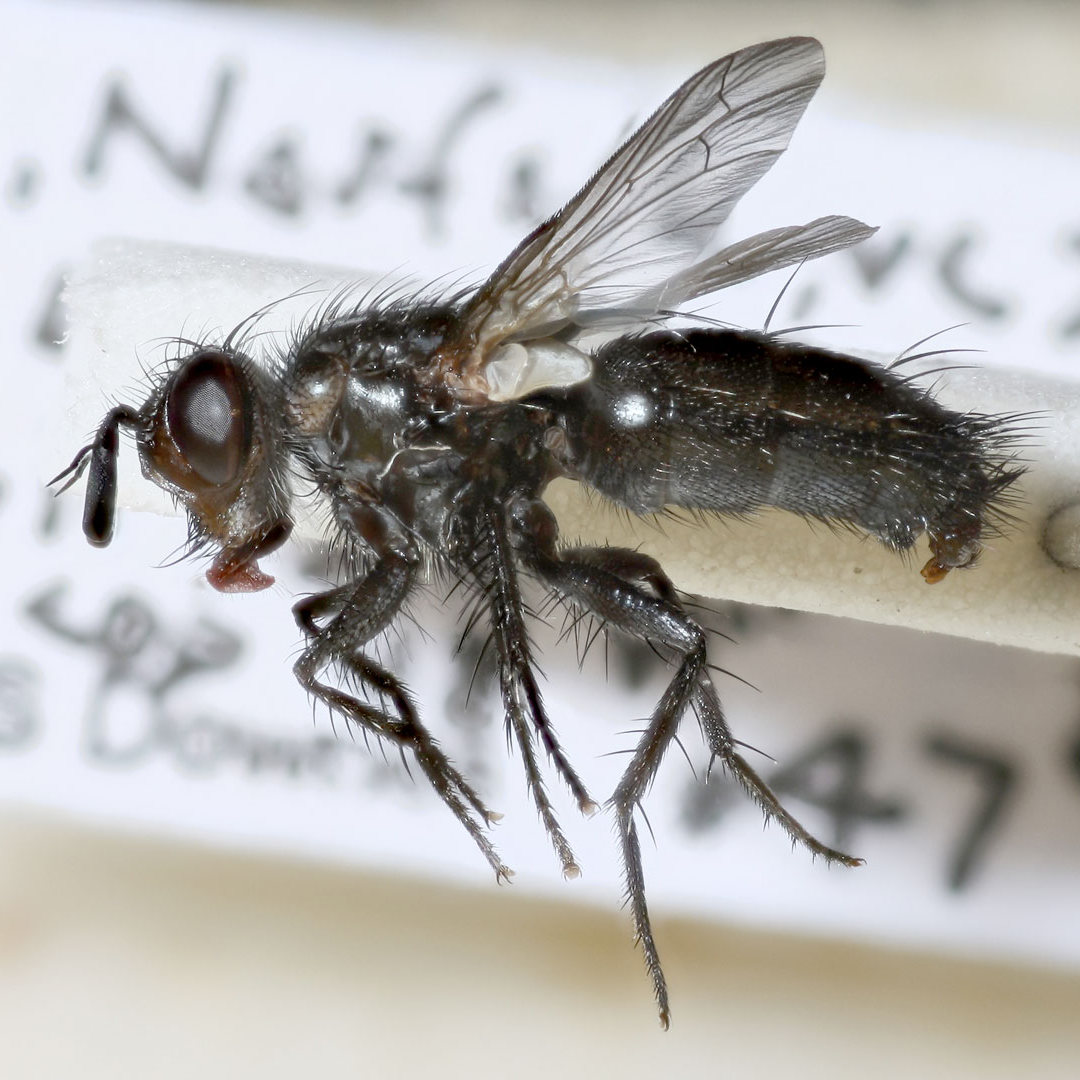
- A fly from Germaria genus of Germariini Tribe.

Scientific classification
- Kingdom: Animalia
- Phylum: Arthropoda
- Clade: Pancrustacea
- Class: Insecta
- Order: Diptera
- Family: Tachinidae
- Subfamily: Tachininae
- Tribe: Germariini

= Germariini =

Tribe of flies

Germariini is a tribe of flies in the family Tachinidae.

== Genera ==
- Germaria Robineau-Desvoidy, 1830
