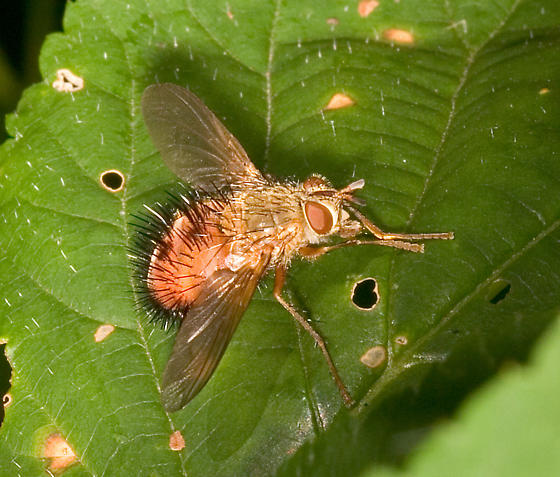
- Hystricia abrupta

Scientific classification
- Kingdom: Animalia
- Phylum: Arthropoda
- Clade: Pancrustacea
- Class: Insecta
- Order: Diptera
- Family: Tachinidae
- Subfamily: Tachininae
- Tribe: Polideini

= Polideini =

Tribe of flies

Polideini is a tribe of bristle flies in the family Tachinidae. The tribe is unusual for its diversity of hosts, including spiders, scorpions, and centipedes in addition to the usual insect larvae.

== Genera ==
- Andicesa Koçak & Kemal, 2010
- Arctosoma Aldrich, 1934
- Chlorohystricia Townsend, 1927
- Chromatocera Townsend, 1915
- Chrysotachina Brauer & von Bergenstamm, 1889
- Comops Aldrich, 1934
- Deloblepharis Aldrich, 1934
- Desantisodes Cortés, 1973
- Dichocera Williston, 1895
- Dolichostoma Townsend, 1912
- Ecuadorana Townsend, 1912
- Ernestiopsis Townsend, 1931
- Eucheirophaga James, 1945
- Euscopolia Townsend, 1892
- Exoernestia Townsend, 1927
- Exoristoides Coquillett, 1897
- Ganoproctus Aldrich, 1934
- Homalactia Townsend, 1915
- Hystricia Macquart, 1844
- Lydina Robineau-Desvoidy, 1830
- Lygaeomyia Aldrich, 1934
- Lypha Robineau-Desvoidy, 1830
- Mactomyia Reinhard, 1958
- Mauromyia Coquillett, 1897
- Mesembrierigone Townsend, 1931
- Micronychia Brauer & von Bergenstamm, 1889
- Nigrilypha O’Hara, 2002
- Notoderus Cortés, 1986
- Ollacheryphe Townsend, 1927
- Opsophasiopteryx Townsend, 1917
- Opticopteryx Townsend, 1931
- Ostracophyto Townsend, 1915
- Pachycheta Portschinsky, 1881
- Petagnia Rondani, 1856
- Prolypha Townsend, 1934
- Pseudobombyliomyia Townsend, 1931
- Punamyia Townsend, 1915
- Pyrrhoernestia Townsend, 1931
- Spilochaetosoma Smith, 1917
- Tarpessita Reinhard, 1967
- Telodytes Aldrich, 1934
- Visayalydina Townsend, 1926
- Xanthopelta Aldrich, 1934
