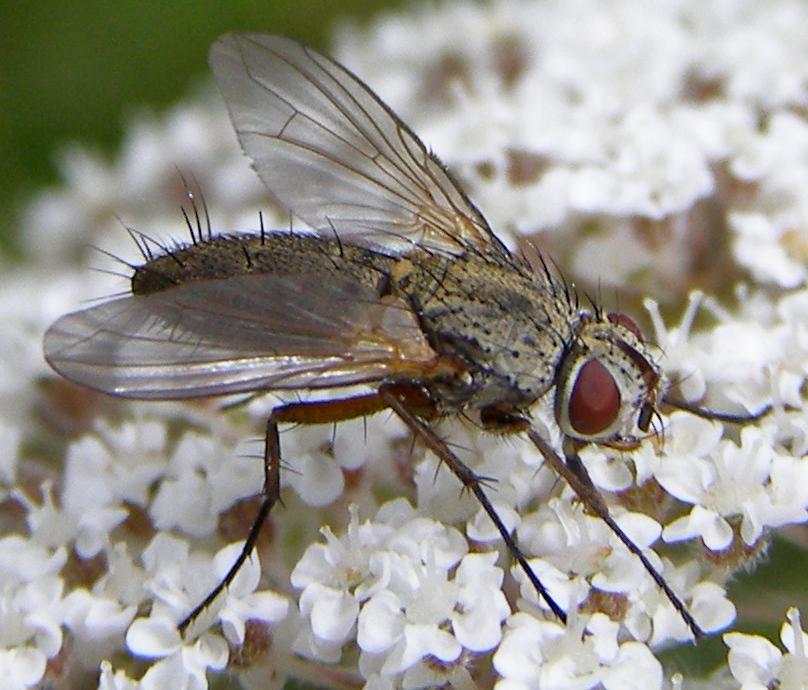
- Solieria sp

Scientific classification
- Kingdom: Animalia
- Phylum: Arthropoda
- Class: Insecta
- Order: Diptera
- Family: Tachinidae
- Subfamily: Tachininae
- Tribe: Leskiini; Townsend, 1919

= Leskiini =

Tribe of flies

Leskiini is a tribe of flies in the family Tachinidae.

== Genera ==
- Apatemyia Macquart, 1846
- Aphria Robineau-Desvoidy, 1830
- Atylostoma Brauer & von Bergenstamm, 1889
- Austrosolieria Cerretti & O’Hara, 2016
- Beskioleskia Townsend, 1919
- Bezziomyiobia Baranov, 1938
- Bithia Robineau-Desvoidy, 1863
- Cavillatrix Richter, 1986
- Clausicella Rondani, 1856
- Cololeskia Villeneuve, 1939
- Crocinosoma Reinhard, 1947
- Cyanoleskia Mesnil, 1978
- Demoticoides Mesnil, 1953
- Demoticus Macquart, 1854
- Dolichopalpellus Townsend, 1927
- Drepanoglossa Townsend, 1891
- Epicoronimyia Blanchard, 1940
- Exechopalpus Macquart, 1847
- Fischeria Robineau-Desvoidy, 1830
- Galapagosia Curran, 1934
- Genea Rondani, 1850
- Geneodes Townsend, 1934
- Ginglymia Townsend, 1892
- Leskia Robineau-Desvoidy, 1830
- Leskiola Mesnil, 1957
- Metamyobia Townsend, 1927
- Mintholeskia Townsend, 1934
- Myobiomima Townsend, 1926
- Naira Richter, 1970
- Neaphria Townsend, 1914
- Nigara Richter, 1999
- Ocypteromima Townsend, 1916
- Oraeosoma Cortés, 1976
- Oxymedoria Villeneuve, 1916
- Oxyphyllomyia Villeneuve, 1937
- Parthenoleskia Townsend, 1941
- Phantasiomyia Townsend, 1915
- Prodemoticus Villeneuve, 1919
- Proleskiomima Townsend, 1934
- Rhinomyobia Brauer & von Bergenstamm, 1893
- Siphoactia Townsend, 1927
- Siphocrocuta Townsend, 1935
- Solieria Robineau-Desvoidy, 1849
- Spathipalpus Rondani, 1863
- Stomatodexia Brauer & von Bergenstamm, 1889
- Tapajoleskia Townsend, 1934
- Thelairoleskia Townsend, 1926
- Tipuloleskia Townsend, 1931
- Toxocnemis Macquart, 1855
- Trichoformosomyia Baranov, 1934
- Trochiloglossa Townsend, 1919
- Trochiloleskia Townsend, 1917
- Uruleskia Townsend, 1934
- Urumyobia Townsend, 1934
