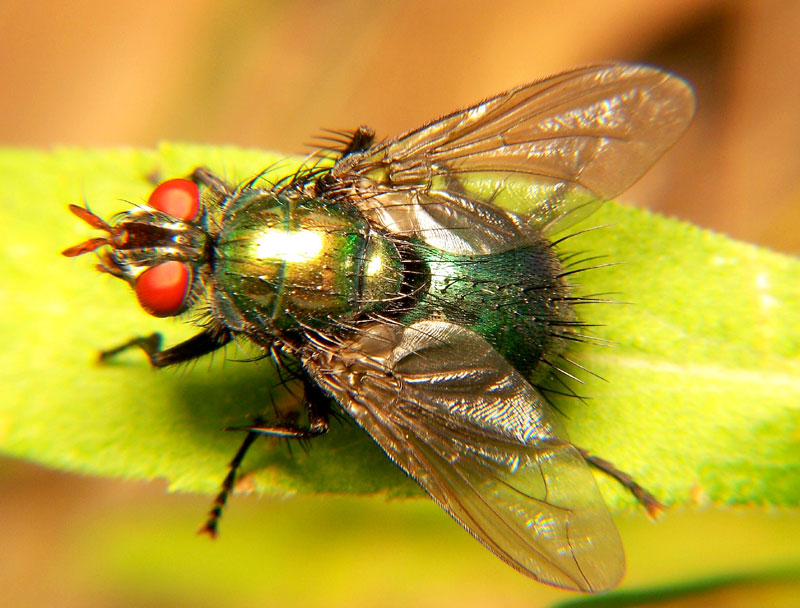
- Gymnocheta viridis

Scientific classification
- Kingdom: Animalia
- Phylum: Arthropoda
- Clade: Pancrustacea
- Class: Insecta
- Order: Diptera
- Family: Tachinidae
- Subfamily: Tachininae; Robineau-Desvoidy, 1830

= Tachininae =

Subfamily of flies

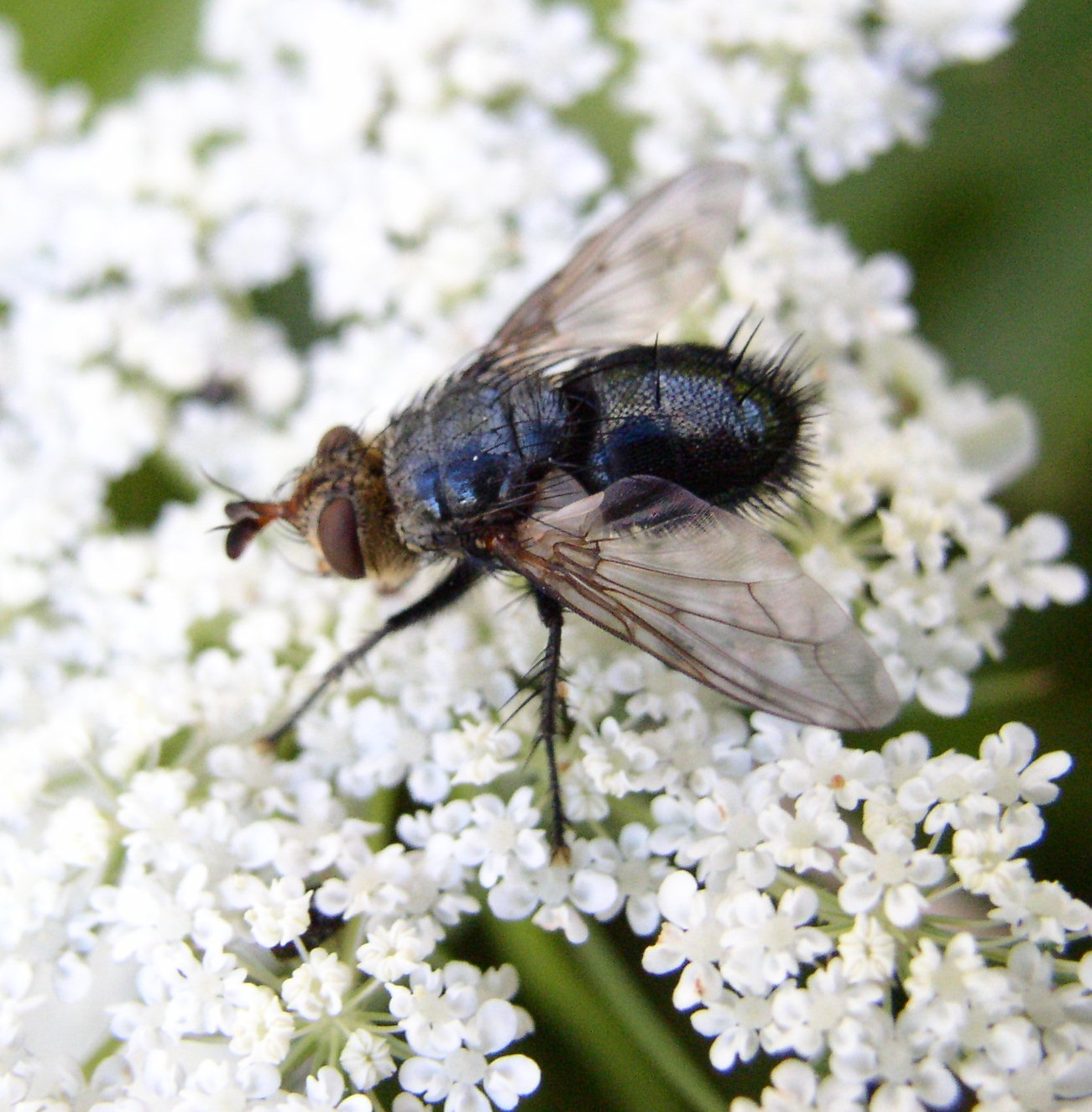
Archytas sp.

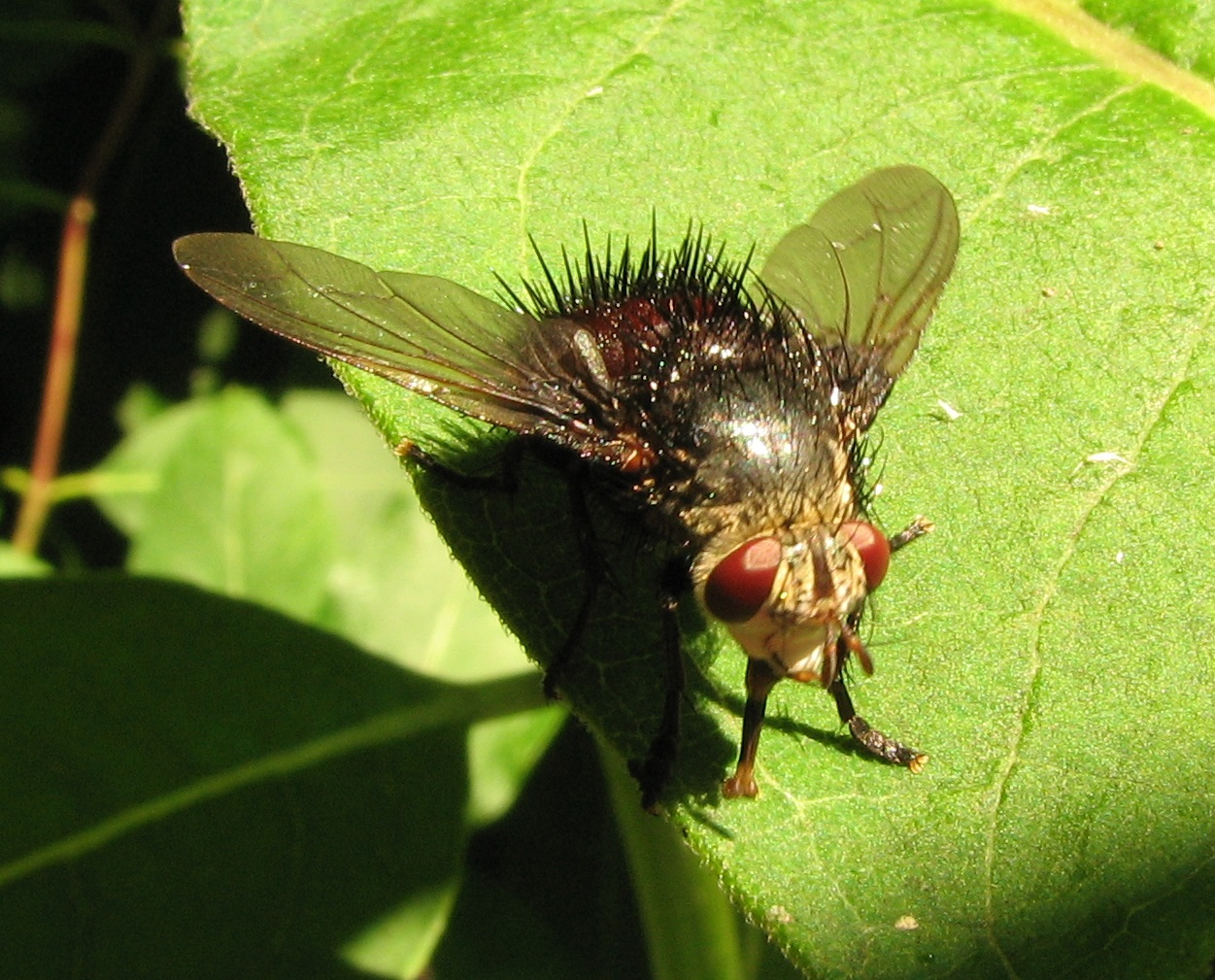
Juriniopsis adusta, female

Tachininae is a subfamily of flies in the family Tachinidae.

== Tribes & genera ==
The classification below has been called into question by Stireman et al. but new tribal assignments have not been formally published.

- Tribe Bigonichetini

- Cucuba Richter, 2008
- Lissoglossa Villeneuve, 1913
- Triarthria Stephens, 1829
- Trichactia Stein, 1924

- Tribe Brachymerini

- Brachymera Brauer & Bergenstamm, 1889
- Neoemdenia Mesnil, 1953
- Pelamera Herting, 1969
- Pseudopachystylum Mik, 1891

- Tribe Ernestiini

- Bombyliomyia Brauer & von Berganstamm, 1889
- Brachelia Robineau-Desvoidy, 1830
- Bracheliopsis Emden, 1960
- Bracteola Richter, 1972
- Chaetophthalmus Brauer & von Berganstamm, 1891
- Chiricahuia Townsend, 1918
- Chlorotachina Townsend, 1915
- Chrysosomopsis Townsend, 1916
- Cleonice Robineau-Desvoidy, 1863
- Coloradomyia Arnaud, 1963
- Corybantia Richter, 1986
- Eloceria Robineau-Desvoidy, 1863
- Emporomyia Brauer & von Bergenstamm, 1891
- Erebiomima Mesnil, 1953
- Euhystricia Townsend, 1914
- Everestiomyia Townsend, 1933
- Flavicorniculum Chao & Shi, 1981
- Gastroptilops Mesnil, 1957
- Gymnocheta Robineau-Desvoidy, 1830
- Gymnoglossa Mik, 1898
- Hineomyia Townsend, 1916
- Hyalurgus Brauer & von Bergenstamm, 1893
- Janthinomyia Brauer & von Bergenstamm, 1893
- Lambrusca Richter, 1998
- Linnaemya Robineau-Desvoidy, 1830
- Loewia Egger, 1856
- Lyphosia Mesnil, 1957
- Macrochloria Malloch, 1929
- Marshallomyia Fennah in van Emden, 1960
- Mehmetia Özdikmen, 2007
- Melanophrys Williston, 1886
- Microcerophina Kugler, 1977
- Montuosa Chao & Zhou, 1996
- Munira Richter, 1974
- Neximyia Crosskey, 1967
- Panzeria Robineau-Desvoidy, 1830
- Phobetromyia Reinhard, 1964
- Plagiocoma Villeneuve, 1916
- Schizolinnaea Emden, 1960
- Sonaca Richter, 1981
- Symmorphomyia Mesnil & Shima, 1977
- Synactia Villeneuve, 1915
- Tachinophasia Townsend, 1931
- Trixoclea Villeneuve, 1916
- Zophomyia Macquart, 1835

- Tribe Germariini

- Germaria Robineau-Desvoidy, 1830

- Tribe Germariochaetini

- Germariochaeta Villeneuve, 1937
- Lophosiosoma Mesnil, 1973

- Tribe Glaurocarini

- Glaurocara Thomson, 1869
- Semisuturia Malloch, 1927

- Tribe Graphogastrini

- Ancistrophora Schiner, 1865
- Austrophytomyptera Blanchard, 1962
- Camposodes Cortés, 1967
- Clastoneura Aldrich, 1934
- Clastoneuriopsis Reinhard, 1939
- Graphogaster Rondani, 1868
- Haywardimyia Blanchard, 1955
- Heraultia Villeneuve, 1920
- Mayoschizocera Townsend, 1927
- Neocraspedothrix Townsend, 1927
- Phytomyptera Rondani, 1845
- Planomyia Aldrich, 1934
- Plectopsis Townsend, 1927
- Sarrorhina Villeneuve, 1936
- Sisyphomyia Townsend, 1927
- Trichschizotachina Townsend, 1935
- Voriella Malloch, 1930

- Tribe Iceliini

- Erviopsis Townsend, 1934
- Icelia Robineau-Desvoidy, 1830
- Iceliopsis Guimarães, 1976

- Tribe Leskiini

- Apatemyia Macquart, 1846
- Aphria Robineau-Desvoidy, 1830
- Atylostoma Brauer & von Bergenstamm, 1889
- Austrosolieria Cerretti & O'Hara, 2016
- Beskioleskia Townsend, 1919
- Bezziomyiobia Baranov, 1938
- Bithia Robineau-Desvoidy, 1863
- Cavillatrix Richter, 1986
- Clausicella Rondani, 1856
- Cololeskia Villeneuve, 1939
- Crocinosoma Reinhard, 1947
- Cyanoleskia Mesnil, 1978
- Demoticoides Mesnil, 1953
- Demoticus Macquart, 1854
- Dolichopalpellus Townsend, 1927
- Drepanoglossa Townsend, 1891
- Epicoronimyia Blanchard, 1940
- Exechopalpus Macquart, 1847
- Fischeria Robineau-Desvoidy, 1830
- Galapagosia Curran, 1934
- Genea Rondani, 1850
- Geneodes Townsend, 1934
- Ginglymia Townsend, 1892
- Leskia Robineau-Desvoidy, 1830
- Leskiola Mesnil, 1957
- Metamyobia Townsend, 1927
- Mintholeskia Townsend, 1934
- Myobiomima Townsend, 1926
- Naira Richter, 1970
- Neaphria Townsend, 1914
- Nigara Richter, 1999
- Ocypteromima Townsend, 1916
- Oraeosoma Cortés, 1976
- Oxymedoria Villeneuve, 1916
- Oxyphyllomyia Villeneuve, 1937
- Parthenoleskia Townsend, 1941
- Phantasiomyia Townsend, 1915
- Prodemoticus Villeneuve, 1919
- Proleskiomima Townsend, 1934
- Rhinomyobia Brauer & von Bergenstamm, 1893
- Siphoactia Townsend, 1927
- Siphocrocuta Townsend, 1935
- Solieria Robineau-Desvoidy, 1849
- Spathipalpus Rondani, 1863
- Stomatodexia Brauer & von Bergenstamm, 1889
- Tapajoleskia Townsend, 1934
- Thelairoleskia Townsend, 1926
- Tipuloleskia Townsend, 1931
- Toxocnemis Macquart, 1855
- Trichoformosomyia Baranov, 1934
- Trochiloglossa Townsend, 1919
- Trochiloleskia Townsend, 1917
- Uruleskia Townsend, 1934
- Urumyobia Townsend, 1934

- Tribe Macquartiini

- Anthomyiopsis Townsend, 1916
- Chyuluella Van Emden, 1960
- Dicarca Richter, 1993
- Gonatorrhina Röder, 1886
- Gymnomacquartia Mesnil & Shima, 1978
- Lafuentemyia Marnef, 1965
- Macquartia Robineau-Desvoidy, 1830
- Macroprosopa Brauer & von Bergenstamm, 1889
- Porphyromus Van Emden, 1960
- Pseudebenia Shima, Han & Tachi, 2010

- Tribe Megaprosopini

- Acronacantha Wulp, 1891
- Amesiomima Mesnil, 1950
- Ciala Richter, 1976
- Cyrtocladia Van Emden, 1947
- Dexiosoma Rondani, 1856
- Irengia Townsend, 1935
- Megaprosopus Macquart, 1844
- Melisoneura Rondani, 1861
- Microphthalma Macquart, 1844
- Montanothalma Barraclough, 1996
- Parhamaxia Mesnil, 1967
- Protrichoprosopis Blanchard, 1966
- Pyrrhodexia Townsend, 1931
- Richteriola Mesnil, 1963
- Stuardomyia Cortés, 1945
- Trichoceronia Cortés, 1945
- Trichoprosopus Macquart, 1844

- Tribe Minthoini

- Actinochaeta Brauer & von Bergenstamm, 1889
- Actinominthella Townsend, 1928
- Austrophasiopsis Townsend, 1933
- Diaphoropeza Townsend, 1908
- Dolichopodomintho Townsend, 1927
- Dyshypostena Villeneuve, 1939
- Hyperaea Robineau-Desvoidy, 1863
- Magripa Richter, 1988
- Megistogastropsis Townsend, 1916
- Melanasomyia Malloch, 1935
- Mesnilus Özdikmen, 2007
- Mintho Robineau-Desvoidy, 1830
- Minthodes Brauer & von Bergenstamm, 1889
- Minthoxia Mesnil, 1968
- Mongolomintho Richter, 1976
- Neometachaeta Townsend, 1915
- Palmonia Kugler, 1972
- Paradidyma Brauer & von Bergenstamm, 1891
- Plesina Meigen, 1838
- Promintho Townsend, 1926
- Pseudominthodes Townsend, 1933
- Rossimyiops Mesnil, 1953
- Sumpigaster Macquart, 1855
- Tipulidomima Townsend, 1933
- Vanderwulpia Townsend, 1891
- Ventoplagia Richter, 2009
- Xiphochaeta Mesnil, 1968
- Ziminia Mesnil, 1963

- Tribe Myiophasiini

- Cesapanama Koçak & Kemal, 2010
- Cholomyia Bigot, 1884
- Euloewiopsis Townsend, 1917
- Gnadochaeta Macquart, 1851
- Metamyiophasia Blanchard, 1966
- Myiophasiomima Blanchard, 1966
- Plesiodexilla Blanchard, 1966
- Protonotodytes Blanchard, 1966
- Schwarzalia Curran, 1934

- Tribe Myiotrixini

- Myiotrixa Brauer & Bergenstamm, 1893
- Obscuromyia Barraclough & O'Hara, 1998

- Tribe Neaerini

- Calotachina Malloch, 1938
- Genotrichia Malloch, 1938
- Microhystricia Malloch, 1938
- Montanarturia Miller, 1945
- Neaera Robineau-Desvoidy, 1830
- Neoplectops Malloch, 1930
- Scomma Richter, 1972
- Wattia Malloch, 1938
- Xenorhynchia Malloch, 1938

- Tribe Nemoraeini

- Calohystricia Townsend, 1931
- Ceromasiopsis Townsend, 1927
- Hypotachina Brauer & von Bergenstamm, 1891
- Hystriomyia Portschinsky, 1881
- Lasiona Wulp, 1890
- Lasiopalpus Macquart, 1847
- Macromya Robineau-Desvoidy, 1830
- Nemoraea Robineau-Desvoidy, 1830
- Xanthophyto Townsend, 1916
- Xylocamptomima Townsend, 1927

- Tribe Ormiini

- Aulacephala Macquart, 1851
- Homotrixa Villeneuve, 1914
- Mediosetiger Barraclough, 1983
- Ormia Robineau-Desvoidy, 1830
- Ormiophasia Townsend, 1919
- Phasioormia Townsend, 1933
- Therobia Brauer, 1862

- Tribe Palpostomatini

- Apalpostoma Malloch, 1930
- Eustacomyia Malloch, 1927
- Eutrixa Coquillett, 1897
- Eutrixoides Walton, 1913
- Eutrixopsis Townsend, 1919
- Gonzalezodoria Cortés, 1967
- Hamaxia Walker, 1860
- Hamaxiella Mesnil, 1967
- Isidotus Reinhard, 1962
- Neoxanthobasis Blanchard, 1966
- Palpostoma Robineau-Desvoidy, 1830
- Paraxanthobasis Blanchard, 1966
- Peristasisea Villeneuve, 1934
- Tachinoestrus Portschinsky, 1887
- Xanthobasis Aldrich, 1934
- Xanthooestrus Villeneuve, 1914
- Zamimus Malloch, 1932

- Tribe Pelatachinini

- Paralypha Mesnil, 1963
- Pelatachina Meade, 1894

- Tribe Polideini

- Andicesa Koçak & Kemal, 2010
- Arctosoma Aldrich, 1934
- Chlorohystricia Townsend, 1927
- Chromatocera Townsend, 1915
- Chrysotachina Brauer & von Bergenstamm, 1889
- Comops Aldrich, 1934
- Deloblepharis Aldrich, 1934
- Desantisodes Cortés, 1973
- Dichocera Williston, 1895
- Dolichostoma Townsend, 1912
- Ecuadorana Townsend, 1912
- Ernestiopsis Townsend, 1931
- Eucheirophaga James, 1945
- Euscopolia Townsend, 1892
- Exoernestia Townsend, 1927
- Exoristoides Coquillett, 1897
- Ganoproctus Aldrich, 1934
- Homalactia Townsend, 1915
- Hystricia Macquart, 1844
- Lydina Robineau-Desvoidy, 1830
- Lygaeomyia Aldrich, 1934
- Lypha Robineau-Desvoidy, 1830
- Mactomyia Reinhard, 1958
- Mauromyia Coquillett, 1897
- Mesembrierigone Townsend, 1931
- Micronychia Brauer & von Bergenstamm, 1889
- Nigrilypha O'Hara, 2002
- Notoderus Cortés, 1986
- Ollacheryphe Townsend, 1927
- Opsophasiopteryx Townsend, 1917
- Opticopteryx Townsend, 1931
- Ostracophyto Townsend, 1915
- Pachycheta Portschinsky, 1881
- Petagnia Rondani, 1856
- Prolypha Townsend, 1934
- Pseudobombyliomyia Townsend, 1931
- Punamyia Townsend, 1915
- Pyrrhoernestia Townsend, 1931
- Spilochaetosoma Smith, 1917
- Tarpessita Reinhard, 1967
- Telodytes Aldrich, 1934
- Visayalydina Townsend, 1926
- Xanthopelta Aldrich, 1934

- Tribe Proscissionini

- Altaia Malloch, 1938
- Asetulia Malloch, 1938
- Austromacquartia Townsend, 1934
- Avibrissia Malloch, 1932
- Avibrissina Malloch, 1932
- Bothrophora Schiner, 1868
- Calosia Malloch, 1938
- Campylia Malloch, 1938
- Chaetopletha Malloch, 1938
- Erythronychia Brauer & von Bergenstamm, 1891
- Gracilicera Miller, 1945
- Graphotachina Malloch, 1938
- Heteria Malloch, 1930
- Mallochomacquartia Townsend, 1934
- Medinella Dugdale, 1969
- Neoerythronychia Malloch, 1932
- Neotachina Malloch, 1938
- Occisor Hutton, 1901
- Peremptor Hutton, 1901
- Perrissina Malloch, 1938
- Perrissinoides Dugdale, 1962
- Phaoniella Malloch, 1938
- Platytachina Malloch, 1938
- Plethochaetigera Malloch, 1938
- Proscissio Hutton, 1901
- Prosenosoma Malloch, 1938
- Pygocalcager Townsend, 1935
- Tachineo Malloch, 1938
- Veluta Malloch, 1938
- Zealandotachina Malloch, 1938

- Tribe Protohystriciini

- Protohystricia Malloch, 1929

- Tribe Siphonini

- Actia Robineau-Desvoidy, 1830
- Ceromya Robineau-Desvoidy, 1830
- Deltoceromyia Townsend, 1931
- Entomophaga Lioy, 1864
- Galsania Richter, 1993
- Goniocera Brauer & von Bergenstamm, 1891
- Peribaea Robineau-Desvoidy, 1863
- Proceromyia Mesnil, 1957
- Siphona Meigen, 1803
- Trichotopteryx Townsend, 1919

- Tribe Tachinini

- Abepalpus Townsend, 1931
- Acroceronia Cortés, 1951
- Acuphoceropsis Blanchard, 1943
- Adejeania Townsend, 1913
- Agicuphocera Townsend, 1915
- Archytas Jaennicke, 1867
- Archytoepalpus Townsend, 1927
- Austeniops Townsend, 1915
- Beskiocephala Townsend, 1916
- Bischofimyia Townsend, 1927
- Camposiana Townsend, 1915
- Catajurinia Townsend, 1927
- Chaetoepalpus Vimmer, 1940
- Chrysomikia Mesnil, 1970
- Cnephaotachina Brauer & von Bergenstamm, 1894
- Comopsis Cortés, 1986
- Copecrypta Townsend, 1908
- Corpulentoepalpus Townsend, 1927
- Corpulentosoma Townsend, 1914
- Cryptopalpus Rondani, 1850
- Cyanogymnomma Townsend, 1927
- Cyanopsis Townsend, 1917
- Dejeania Robineau-Desvoidy, 1830
- Dejeaniops Townsend, 1913
- Deopalpus Townsend, 1908
- Diaphanomyia Townsend, 1917
- Dumerillia Robineau-Desvoidy, 1830
- Echinopyrrhosia Townsend, 1914
- Echinopyrrhosiops Townsend, 1931
- Edwynia Aldrich, 1930
- Empheremyia Bischof, 1904
- Empheremyiops Townsend, 1927
- Epalpellus Townsend, 1914
- Epalpodes Townsend, 1912
- Epalpus Rondani, 1850
- Epicuphocera Townsend, 1927
- Eristaliomyia Townsend, 1926
- Erythroepalpus Townsend, 1931
- Eubischofimyia Townsend, 1927
- Eudejeania Townsend, 1912
- Euempheremyia Townsend, 1927
- Euepalpodes Townsend, 1915
- Eufabriciopsis Townsend, 1915
- Euhuascaraya Townsend, 1927
- Eujuriniodes Townsend, 1935
- Eulasiopalpus Townsend, 1913
- Eumelanepalpus Townsend, 1915
- Eusaundersiops Townsend, 1915
- Eutrichophora Townsend, 1915
- Exopalpus Macquart, 1851
- Fabriciopsis Townsend, 1914
- Formicomyia Townsend, 1916
- Gigantoepalpus Townsend, 1931
- Gymnomma Wulp, 1888
- Gymnommopsis Townsend, 1927
- Hegesinus Reinhard, 1964
- Helioprosopa Townsend, 1927
- Homosaundersia Townsend, 1931
- Homosaundersiops Townsend, 1931
- Huascarayopsis Townsend, 1927
- Itacuphocera Townsend, 1927
- Itasaundersia Townsend, 1927
- Jurinella Brauer & von Bergenstamm, 1889
- Jurinia Robineau-Desvoidy, 1830
- Juriniopsis Townsend, 1916
- Juriniosoma Townsend, 1927
- Laufferiella Villeneuve, 1929
- Lindigepalpus Townsend, 1931
- Macrojurinia Townsend, 1916
- Melanepalpellus Townsend, 1927
- Melanepalpus Townsend, 1914
- Mesnilisca Zimin, 1974
- Microgymnomma Townsend, 1916
- Microtropesa Macquart, 1846
- Mikia Kowarz, 1885
- Neocuphocera Townsend, 1927
- Neogymnomma Townsend, 1915
- Neosarromyia Townsend, 1927
- Ochroepalpus Townsend, 1927
- Oestrohystricia Townsend, 1912
- Oharamyia Evenhuis, Pont & Whitmore, 2015
- Opsoempheria Townsend, 1927
- Oxyepalpus Townsend, 1927
- Palpolinnaemyia Townsend, 1927
- Palpotachina Townsend, 1915
- Paradejeania Brauer & von Bergenstamm, 1893
- Pararchytas Brauer & von Bergenstamm, 1895
- Paratachina Brauer & von Bergenstamm, 1891
- Paratropeza Paramonov, 1964
- Parechinotachina Townsend, 1931
- Parepalpus Coquillett, 1902
- Peleteria Robineau-Desvoidy, 1830
- Periopticochaeta Townsend, 1927
- Phosocephala Townsend, 1908
- Pictoepalpus Townsend, 1915
- Platyschineria Villeneuve, 1942
- Prospanipalpus Townsend, 1931
- Protodejeania Townsend, 1915
- Pseudoepalpodes Vimmer and Soukup, 1940
- Pseudoxanthozona Townsend, 1931
- Pseudoxanthozonella Townsend, 1931
- Pyrrhotachina Townsend, 1931
- Quadratosoma Townsend, 1914
- Rhachoepalpus Townsend, 1908
- Rhachosaundersia Townsend, 1931
- Ruiziella Cortés, 1951
- Sarromyia Pokorny, 1893
- Saundersiops Townsend, 1914
- Schineria Rondani, 1857
- Sericotachina Townsend, 1916
- Signosoma Townsend, 1914
- Signosomopsis Townsend, 1914
- Steatosoma Aldrich, 1934
- Tachina Meigen, 1803
- Talarocera Williston, 1887
- Tothillia Crosskey, 1976
- Trichoepalpus Townsend, 1914
- Trichophora Macquart, 1847
- Trichosaundersia Townsend, 1914
- Trypherina Malloch, 1938
- Uruhuasia Townsend, 1914
- Uruhuasiopsis Townsend, 1915
- Vertepalpus Curran, 1947
- Vibrissoepalpus Townsend, 1914
- Vibrissomyia Townsend, 1912
- Xanthoepalpodes Townsend, 1931
- Xanthoepalpus Townsend, 1914
- Xanthozona Townsend, 1908
- Zonoepalpus Townsend, 1927

- Unplaced genera in Tachininae

- Eucoronimyia Townsend, 1908
- Euoestropsis Townsend, 1913
- Evidomyia Reinhard, 1958
- Hypertrophocera Townsend, 1891
- Impeccantia Reinhard, 1961
- Mesembrinormia Townsend, 1931
- Metallicomyia Röder, 1886
- Neotryphera Malloch, 1938
- Oligooestrus Townsend, 1932
- Perumyia Arnaud, 1963
- Proleskia Townsend, 1927
- Zambesa Walker, 1856
