= Lindigia =

Lindigia may refer to:

- Lindigia (ammonite), a fossil genus of ammonite in the family Heteroceratidae
- Lindigia (fly), an unaccepted genus of flies in the family Tachinidae; synonym of Oharamyia
- Lindigia (plant), a genus of mosses in the family Brachytheciaceae
