= Chiloepalpus callipygus =

Scientific classification
- Kingdom: Animalia
- Phylum: Arthropoda
- Class: Insecta
- Order: Diptera
- Family: Tachinidae
- Subfamily: Tachininae
- Tribe: Tachinini
- Genus: Chiloepalpus
- Species: C. callipygus

Binomial name
- Chiloepalpus callipygus (Bigot, 1857)

Synonyms
- Jurinia callipygus Bigot, 1857; Chiloepalpus aurifacies Townsend, 1927

Species of fly

Chiloepalpus callipygus is a species of parasitic fly in the family Tachinidae.

== Distribution ==
Chile.
