= Chiloepalpus aureus =

Scientific classification
- Kingdom: Animalia
- Phylum: Arthropoda
- Class: Insecta
- Order: Diptera
- Family: Tachinidae
- Subfamily: Tachininae
- Tribe: Tachinini
- Genus: Chiloepalpus
- Species: C. aureus

Binomial name
- Chiloepalpus aureus Aldrich, 1926

Synonyms
- Cuphocera aurea Aldrich, 1926

Species of fly

Chiloepalpus aureus is a species of parasitic fly in the family Tachinidae.

== Distribution ==
Chile.
