= Reedia (disambiguation) =

Reedia may refer to:

- Reedia, a genus of plants in the family Cyperaceae
- Reedia (fly), a genus of flies in the family Tachinidae
- Reedia, a fossil genus of trilobites in the family Pterygometopidae, synonym of Reedops
