= Pararchytas decisus =

Scientific classification
- Kingdom: Animalia
- Phylum: Arthropoda
- Class: Insecta
- Order: Diptera
- Family: Tachinidae
- Subfamily: Tachininae
- Tribe: Tachinini
- Genus: Pararchytas
- Species: P. decisus

Binomial name
- Pararchytas decisus (Walker, 1849)

Synonyms
- Tachina decisa Walker, 1849

Species of fly

Pararchytas decisus is a species of bristle fly in the family Tachinidae.

== Distribution ==
Mexico
