= Chiloepalpus factilis =

Scientific classification
- Kingdom: Animalia
- Phylum: Arthropoda
- Class: Insecta
- Order: Diptera
- Family: Tachinidae
- Subfamily: Tachininae
- Tribe: Tachinini
- Genus: Chiloepalpus
- Species: C. factilis

Binomial name
- Chiloepalpus factilis (Reinhard, 1964)

Synonyms
- Euhelioprosopa factilis Reinhard, 1964

Species of fly

Chiloepalpus factilis is a species of parasitic fly in the family Tachinidae.

== Distribution ==
Chile.
