= Gymnommopsis haywardi =

Scientific classification
- Kingdom: Animalia
- Phylum: Arthropoda
- Class: Insecta
- Order: Diptera
- Family: Tachinidae
- Subfamily: Tachininae
- Tribe: Tachinini
- Genus: Gymnommopsis
- Species: G. haywardi

Binomial name
- Gymnommopsis haywardi (Blanchard, 1943)

Synonyms
- Metagymnopsis haywardi Blanchard, 1943

Species of fly

Gymnommopsis haywardi is a species of fly in the genus Gymnommopsis of the family Tachinidae.

== Distribution ==
Argentina.
