= Chromatophania distinguenda =

Scientific classification
- Kingdom: Animalia
- Phylum: Arthropoda
- Class: Insecta
- Order: Diptera
- Family: Tachinidae
- Subfamily: Tachininae
- Tribe: Tachinini
- Genus: Chromatophania
- Species: C. distinguenda

Binomial name
- Chromatophania distinguenda Villeneuve, 1913

Synonyms
- Chromatophania dubia Curran, 1941

Species of fly

Chromatophania distinguenda is a species of bristle fly in the family Tachinidae.

== Distribution ==
Burundi, Congo, Malawi, Uganda.
