= Dumerillia etythrina =

Scientific classification
- Kingdom: Animalia
- Phylum: Arthropoda
- Class: Insecta
- Order: Diptera
- Family: Tachinidae
- Subfamily: Tachininae
- Tribe: Tachinini
- Genus: Dumerillia
- Species: D. etythrina

Binomial name
- Dumerillia etythrina (Bigot, 1888)

Synonyms
- Hystricia etythrina Bigot, 1888

Species of fly

Dumerillia etythrina is a species of bristle fly in the family Tachinidae.

== Distribution ==
Brazil
