= Chromatophania =

Scientific classification
- Kingdom: Animalia
- Phylum: Arthropoda
- Class: Insecta
- Order: Diptera
- Family: Tachinidae
- Subfamily: Tachininae
- Tribe: Tachinini
- Genus: Chromatophania; Bergenstamm, 1889

Type species
- Gonia picta Wiedemann, 1830

Genus of flies

Chromatophania is a genus of flies in the family Tachinidae.

== Species ==
- Chromatophania distinguenda Villeneuve, 1913
- Chromatophania emdeni Mesnil, 1952
- Chromatophania fenestrata Villeneuve, 1913
- Chromatophania picta (Wiedemann, 1830)
- Chromatophania versicolor (Karsch, 1879)
