= Gymnommopsis gagtea =

Scientific classification
- Kingdom: Animalia
- Phylum: Arthropoda
- Class: Insecta
- Order: Diptera
- Family: Tachinidae
- Subfamily: Tachininae
- Tribe: Tachinini
- Genus: Gymnommopsis
- Species: G. gagtea

Binomial name
- Gymnommopsis gagtea Townsend, 1927

Species of fly

Gymnommopsis gagtea is a species of fly in the genus Gymnommopsis of the family Tachinidae.

== Distribution ==
Brazil.
