= Chiloepalpus =

Scientific classification
- Kingdom: Animalia
- Phylum: Arthropoda
- Class: Insecta
- Order: Diptera
- Family: Tachinidae
- Subfamily: Tachininae
- Tribe: Tachinini
- Genus: Chiloepalpus; Townsend, 1927

Type species
- Chiloepalpus aurifacies Townsend, 1927

Synonyms
- Euhelioprosopa Reinhard, 1964

Genus of flies

Chiloepalpus is a genus of flies in the family Tachinidae.

== Species ==
- Chiloepalpus aureus (Aldrich, 1926)
- Chiloepalpus callipygus (Bigot, 1857)
- Chiloepalpus factilis (Reinhard, 1964)

== Distribution ==
Chile.
