= Paratropeza =

Scientific classification
- Kingdom: Animalia
- Phylum: Arthropoda
- Class: Insecta
- Order: Diptera
- Family: Tachinidae
- Subfamily: Tachininae
- Tribe: Tachinini
- Genus: Paratropeza; Paramonov, 1964

Type species
- Paratropeza flavibasis Paramonov, 1964

Genus of flies

Paratropeza is a genus of flies in the family Tachinidae.

== Species ==
- Paratropeza atra Paramonov, 1964
- Paratropeza brandti Paramonov, 1964
- Paratropeza flavibasis Paramonov, 1964
- Paratropeza lorentzi Paramonov, 1964
- Paratropeza nuda Paramonov, 1964
- Paratropeza papuana Paramonov, 1964
