= Neosarromyia =

Scientific classification
- Kingdom: Animalia
- Phylum: Arthropoda
- Class: Insecta
- Order: Diptera
- Family: Tachinidae
- Subfamily: Tachininae
- Tribe: Tachinini
- Genus: Neosarromyia; Townsend, 1927

Type species
- Neosarromyia neotropica Townsend, 1927

Synonyms
- Neossarromyia Guimarães, 1971; Antillicolla (Curran, 1927)

Genus of flies

Neosarromyia is a genus of flies in the family Tachinidae.

== Species ==
- Neosarromyia auriceps (Curran, 1927)
- Neosarromyia neotropica Townsend, 1927
- Neosarromyia trinitatis (Thompson, 1963)
