= Allelomyia =

Scientific classification
- Kingdom: Animalia
- Phylum: Arthropoda
- Class: Insecta
- Order: Diptera
- Family: Tachinidae
- Subfamily: Tachininae
- Tribe: Tachinini
- Genus: Allelomyia; Gonzalez, 1992

Type species
- Allelomyia discalis González, 1992

Genus of flies

Allelomyia is a genus of flies in the family Tachinidae.

== Species ==
- Allelomyia discalis González, 1992

== Distribution ==
Chile.
