= Cnephaotachina =

Scientific classification
- Kingdom: Animalia
- Phylum: Arthropoda
- Class: Insecta
- Order: Diptera
- Family: Tachinidae
- Subfamily: Tachininae
- Tribe: Tachinini
- Genus: Cnephaotachina; Brauer & von Bergenstamm, 1894

Type species
- Cnephaotachina crepusculi Brauer & von Bergenstamm, 1894

Genus of flies

Cnephaotachina is a genus of flies in the family Tachinidae.

== Species ==
- Cnephaotachina danilevskyi (Portschinsky, 1882)
- Cnephaotachina spectanda (Villeneuve, 1930)
