= Eudejeania =

Scientific classification
- Kingdom: Animalia
- Phylum: Arthropoda
- Class: Insecta
- Order: Diptera
- Family: Tachinidae
- Subfamily: Tachininae
- Tribe: Tachinini
- Genus: Eudejeania; Townsend, 1912

Type species
- Eudejeania subalpina Townsend, 1912

Synonyms
- Bombyliojeania Townsend, 1913; Eudejeaniops Blanchard, 1941

Genus of flies

Eudejeania is a genus of flies in the family Tachinidae.

== Species ==
- Eudejeania albipila Curran, 1941
- Eudejeania aldrichi Sabrosky, 1947
- Eudejeania andeana Sabrosky, 1947
- Eudejeania argyropa (Schiner, 1868)
- Eudejeania atrata (Guerin-Meneville, 1844)
- Eudejeania birabeni (Blanchard, 1941)
- Eudejeania browni Curran, 1941
- Eudejeania femoralis Curran, 1941
- Eudejeania huascarayana Townsend, 1914
- Eudejeania melanax (Walker, 1849)
- Eudejeania mexicana (Robineau-Desvoidy, 1863)
- Eudejeania nigra Townsend, 1912
- Eudejeania nuditibia Sabrosky, 1947
- Eudejeania pachecoi Curran, 1941
- Eudejeania pallida (Robineau-Desvoidy, 1863)
- Eudejeania pallipes (Macquart, 1844)
- Eudejeania pilosa Curran, 1941
- Eudejeania pseudopyrrhopoda (Blanchard, 1941)
- Eudejeania punensis Townsend, 1913
- Eudejeania pyrrhopoda Engel, 1920
- Eudejeania subalpina Townsend, 1912
