= Eujuriniodes =

Scientific classification
- Kingdom: Animalia
- Phylum: Arthropoda
- Class: Insecta
- Order: Diptera
- Family: Tachinidae
- Subfamily: Tachininae
- Tribe: Tachinini
- Genus: Eujuriniodes; Townsend, 1935

Type species
- Eujuriniodes eva Townsend, 1935

Genus of flies

Eujuriniodes is a genus of flies in the family Tachinidae.

== Species ==
- Eujuriniodes assimilis (Wulp, 1892)
- Eujuriniodes eva Townsend, 1935
