= Eubischofimyia =

Scientific classification
- Kingdom: Animalia
- Phylum: Arthropoda
- Class: Insecta
- Order: Diptera
- Family: Tachinidae
- Subfamily: Tachininae
- Tribe: Tachinini
- Genus: Eubischofimyia; Townsend, 1927

Type species
- Eubischofimyia analis Townsend, 1927

Synonyms
- Eubischofimiya Neave, 1939

Genus of flies

Eubischofimyia is a genus of flies in the family Tachinidae.

== Species ==
- Eubischofimyia analis Townsend, 1927

== Distribution ==
Brazil.
