= Agicuphocera =

Scientific classification
- Kingdom: Animalia
- Phylum: Arthropoda
- Class: Insecta
- Order: Diptera
- Family: Tachinidae
- Subfamily: Tachininae
- Tribe: Tachinini
- Genus: Agicuphocera; Townsend, 1915

Type species
- Agicuphocera nigra Townsend, 1915

Genus of flies

Agicuphocera is a genus of flies in the family Tachinidae.

== Species ==
- Agicuphocera nigra Townsend, 1915
