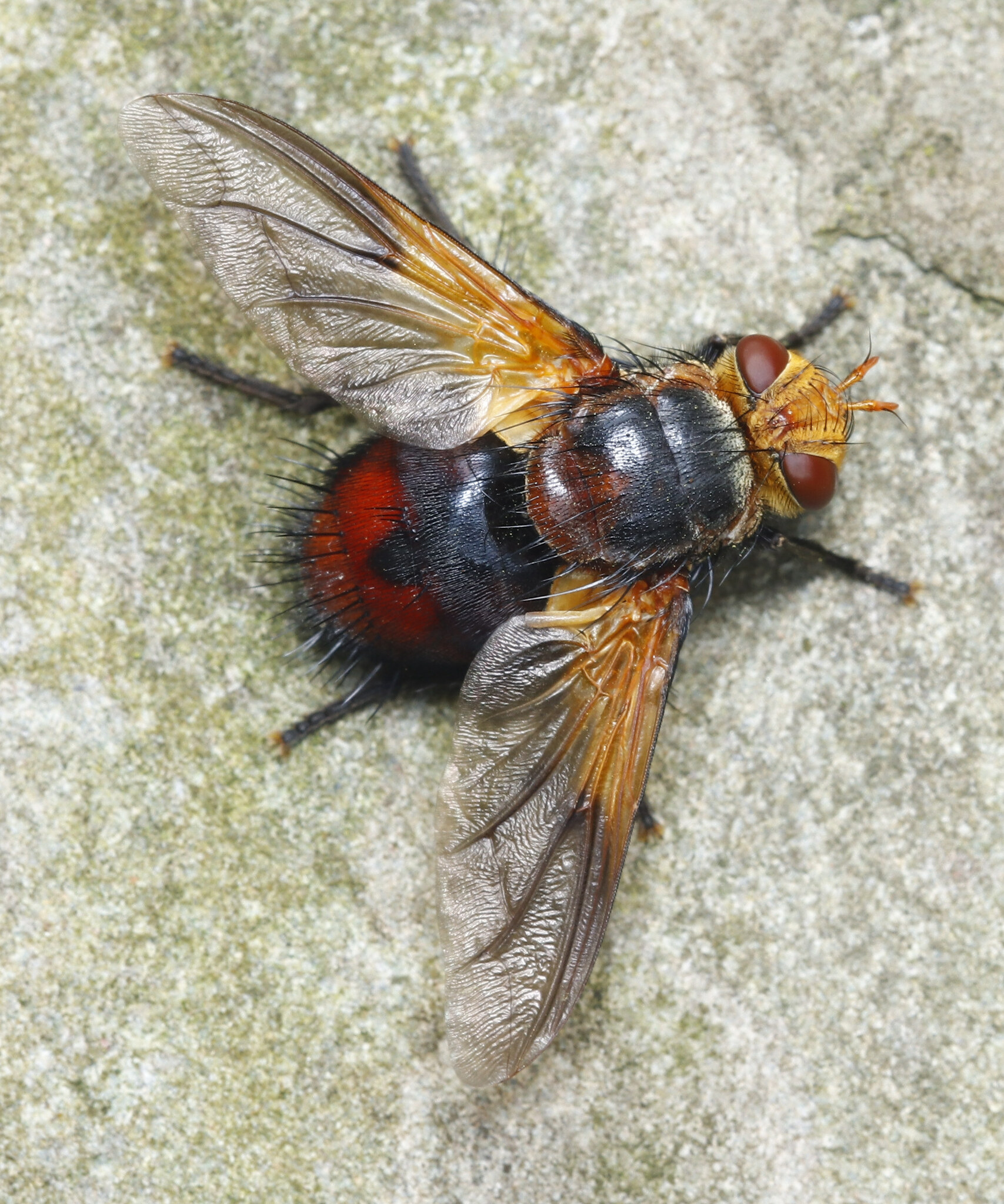
- Mikia tepens

Scientific classification
- Kingdom: Animalia
- Phylum: Arthropoda
- Class: Insecta
- Order: Diptera
- Family: Tachinidae
- Subfamily: Tachininae
- Tribe: Tachinini
- Genus: Mikia; Kowarz, 1885

Type species
- Fabricia magnifica Walker, 1849

Synonyms
- Sumatrotachina Townsend, 1927

= Mikia =

Genus of flies

Mikia is a genus of flies in the family Tachinidae.

== Species ==
- Mikia choui Wang & Zhang, 2012
- Mikia lampros (Wulp, 1896)
- Mikia orientalis Chao & Zhou, 1998
- Mikia tepens (Walker, 1849)
- Mikia yunnanica Chao & Zhou, 1998
