= Paratachina =

Scientific classification
- Domain: Eukaryota
- Kingdom: Animalia
- Phylum: Arthropoda
- Class: Insecta
- Order: Diptera
- Family: Tachinidae
- Tribe: Tachinini
- Genus: Paratachina; Brauer & Bergenstamm, 1891

Genus of flies

Paratachina is a genus of parasitic flies in the family Tachinidae. There are at least two described species in Paratachina.

== Species ==
These two species belong to the genus Paratachina:

- Paratachina costae (Jaennicke, 1867)
- Paratachina obliqua (Loew, 1863)
