= Trichophora =

Scientific classification
- Kingdom: Animalia
- Phylum: Arthropoda
- Clade: Pancrustacea
- Class: Insecta
- Order: Diptera
- Family: Tachinidae
- Subfamily: Tachininae
- Tribe: Tachinini
- Genus: Trichophora; Macquart, 1847

Synonyms
- Gabanimyia Townsend, 1914; Huascaraya Townsend, 1914; Paragymnomma Brauer & von Bergenstamm, 1891; Parepalpodes Townsend, 1915; Siphoniomyia Bigot, 1885; Siphonionomyia Bigot, 1885; Trichophora Macquart, 1847

Genus of flies

Trichophora is a genus of flies in the family Tachinidae.

== Species ==
- Trichophora albocalyptrata Bigot, 1888
- Trichophora analis Schiner, 1868
- Trichophora convexinervis Wulp, 1892
- Trichophora melas (Bigot, 1885)
- Trichophora nigra Macquart, 1847
- Trichophora polita (Townsend, 1914)
- Trichophora rimacensis (Townsend, 1915)
- Trichophora rufina Wulp, 1888
- Trichophora tegulata (Townsend, 1914)
