= Empheremyia =

Scientific classification
- Kingdom: Animalia
- Phylum: Arthropoda
- Class: Insecta
- Order: Diptera
- Family: Tachinidae
- Subfamily: Tachininae
- Tribe: Tachinini
- Genus: Empheremyia; Bischof, 1904

Type species
- Empheremyia atra Bischof, 1904

Genus of flies

Empheremyia is a genus of flies in the family Tachinidae.

== Species ==
- Empheremyia atra Bischof, 1904
- Empheremyia leopoldiensis (Brauer, 1897)
