= Vibrissomyia =

Scientific classification
- Kingdom: Animalia
- Phylum: Arthropoda
- Class: Insecta
- Order: Diptera
- Family: Tachinidae
- Subfamily: Tachininae
- Tribe: Tachinini
- Genus: Vibrissomyia; Townsend, 1912

Type species
- Vibrissomyia lineata Townsend, 1912

Genus of flies

Vibrissomyia is a genus of flies in the family Tachinidae.

== Species ==
- Vibrissomyia bicolor Townsend, 1912
- Vibrissomyia concinnata González, 1992
- Vibrissomyia erythrostoma (Bigot, 1888)
- Vibrissomyia lineolata (Bigot, 1888)
- Vibrissomyia notata Cortés, 1967
- Vibrissomyia oroyensis Townsend, 1914
- Vibrissomyia pullata Cortés, 1951
