= Helioprosopa aurifodina =

Scientific classification
- Domain: Eukaryota
- Kingdom: Animalia
- Phylum: Arthropoda
- Class: Insecta
- Order: Diptera
- Family: Tachinidae
- Genus: Helioprosopa
- Species: H. aurifodina

Binomial name
- Helioprosopa aurifodina Reinhard, 1964

Species of fly

Helioprosopa aurifodina is a species of tachinid flies in the genus Helioprosopa of the family Tachinidae.
