= Eristaliomyia =

Scientific classification
- Kingdom: Animalia
- Phylum: Arthropoda
- Class: Insecta
- Order: Diptera
- Family: Tachinidae
- Subfamily: Tachininae
- Tribe: Tachinini
- Genus: Eristaliomyia; Townsend, 1926

Type species
- Eristaliomyia nitidifrons Townsend, 1926

Genus of flies

Eristaliomyia is a genus of flies in the family Tachinidae.

== Species ==
- Eristaliomyia brevipennis (Walker, 1856)
