= Helioprosopa =

Scientific classification
- Kingdom: Animalia
- Phylum: Arthropoda
- Class: Insecta
- Order: Diptera
- Family: Tachinidae
- Subfamily: Tachininae
- Tribe: Tachinini
- Genus: Helioprosopa; Townsend, 1927

Type species
- Helioprosopa facialis Townsend, 1927

Genus of flies

Helioprosopa is a genus of flies in the family Tachinidae.

== Species ==
- Helioprosopa aurifodina Reinhard, 1964
- Helioprosopa electilis Reinhard, 1964
- Helioprosopa facialis Townsend, 1927
- Helioprosopa finita Reinhard, 1964
- Helioprosopa liciata Reinhard, 1964
- Helioprosopa macrocera Reinhard, 1964
- Helioprosopa velada Reinhard, 1964
