= Eusaundersiops =

Scientific classification
- Kingdom: Animalia
- Phylum: Arthropoda
- Class: Insecta
- Order: Diptera
- Family: Tachinidae
- Subfamily: Tachininae
- Tribe: Tachinini
- Genus: Eusaundersiops; Townsend, 1915

Type species
- Saundersia inornatus Schiner, 1868

Genus of flies

Eusaundersiops is a genus of flies in the family Tachinidae.

== Species ==
- Eusaundersiops inortatus (Schiner, 1868)

== Distribution ==
Peru
