= Laufferiella =

Scientific classification
- Kingdom: Animalia
- Phylum: Arthropoda
- Class: Insecta
- Order: Diptera
- Family: Tachinidae
- Subfamily: Tachininae
- Tribe: Tachinini
- Genus: Laufferiella; Villeneuve, 1929

Type species
- Laufferiella elegans Villeneuve, 1929

Synonyms
- Goniomorphomyia Zimin, 1929

Genus of flies

Laufferiella is a genus of flies in the family Tachinidae.

== Species ==
- Laufferiella elegans Villeneuve, 1929
- Laufferiella nigrescens Tschorsnig, 1997
- Laufferiella steini (Zimin, 1931)
