= Acroceronia =

Scientific classification
- Kingdom: Animalia
- Phylum: Arthropoda
- Class: Insecta
- Order: Diptera
- Family: Tachinidae
- Subfamily: Tachininae
- Tribe: Tachinini
- Genus: Acroceronia; Cortés, 1951

Type species
- Acroceronia elquiensis Cortés, 1951

Genus of flies

Acroceronia is a genus of flies in the family Tachinidae.

== Species ==
- Acroceronia elquiensis Cortés, 1951
