= Lindigepalpus =

Scientific classification
- Kingdom: Animalia
- Phylum: Arthropoda
- Class: Insecta
- Order: Diptera
- Family: Tachinidae
- Subfamily: Tachininae
- Tribe: Tachinini
- Genus: Lindigepalpus; Townsend, 1931

Type species
- Hystricia testacea Macquart, 1846

Genus of flies

Lindigepalpus is a genus of flies in the family Tachinidae.

== Species ==
- Lindigepalpus bogotensis Reinhard, 1975
- Lindigepalpus townsendi Guimarães, 1971
