= Camposiana =

Scientific classification
- Kingdom: Animalia
- Phylum: Arthropoda
- Class: Insecta
- Order: Diptera
- Family: Tachinidae
- Subfamily: Tachininae
- Tribe: Tachinini
- Genus: Camposiana; Townsend, 1915

Type species
- Camposiana emarginata Townsend, 1915

Genus of flies

Camposiana is a genus of flies in the family Tachinidae.

== Distribution ==
Ecuador

== Species ==
- Camposiana truncaticornis Townsend, 1915
