= Pararchytas =

Scientific classification
- Kingdom: Animalia
- Phylum: Arthropoda
- Class: Insecta
- Order: Diptera
- Family: Tachinidae
- Subfamily: Tachininae
- Tribe: Tachinini
- Genus: Pararchytas; Brauer & von Bergenstamm, 1894

Type species
- Tachina decisa Walker, 1849

Genus of flies

Pararchytas is a genus of flies in the family Tachinidae.

== Species ==
- Pararchytas apache Woodley, 1998
- Pararchytas decisus (Walker, 1849)
- Pararchytas hammondi Brooks, 1945
