= Archytoepalpus =

Scientific classification
- Kingdom: Animalia
- Phylum: Arthropoda
- Clade: Pancrustacea
- Class: Insecta
- Order: Diptera
- Family: Tachinidae
- Subfamily: Tachininae
- Tribe: Tachinini
- Genus: Archytoepalpus; Townsend, 1927

Type species
- Archytoepalpus rufiventris Townsend, 1927

Genus of flies

Archytoepalpus is a genus of flies in the family Tachinidae.

== Distribution ==
Brazil.

== Species ==
- Archytoepalpus rufiventris Townsend, 1927
