= Pseudoepalpodes =

Scientific classification
- Kingdom: Animalia
- Phylum: Arthropoda
- Class: Insecta
- Order: Diptera
- Family: Tachinidae
- Subfamily: Tachininae
- Tribe: Tachinini
- Genus: Pseudoepalpodes; Vimmer and Soukup, 1940

Type species
- Pseudoepalpodes argenteus Vimmer and Soukup, 1940

Synonyms
- Pseudoepalpodes Vimmer and Soukup, 1940

Genus of flies

Pseudoepalpodes is a genus of flies in the family Tachinidae.

== Species ==
- Pseudoepalpodes argenteus Vimmer & Soukup, 1940

== Distribution ==
Peru.
