= Sarromyia =

Scientific classification
- Kingdom: Animalia
- Phylum: Arthropoda
- Class: Insecta
- Order: Diptera
- Family: Tachinidae
- Subfamily: Tachininae
- Tribe: Tachinini
- Genus: Sarromyia; Pokorny, 1893

Type species
- Sarromyia nubigena Pokorny, 1893

Genus of flies

Sarromyia is a genus of flies in the family Tachinidae.

== Species ==
- Sarromyia nubigena Pokorny, 1893

== Distribution ==
Italy, Austria, France, Switzerland.
