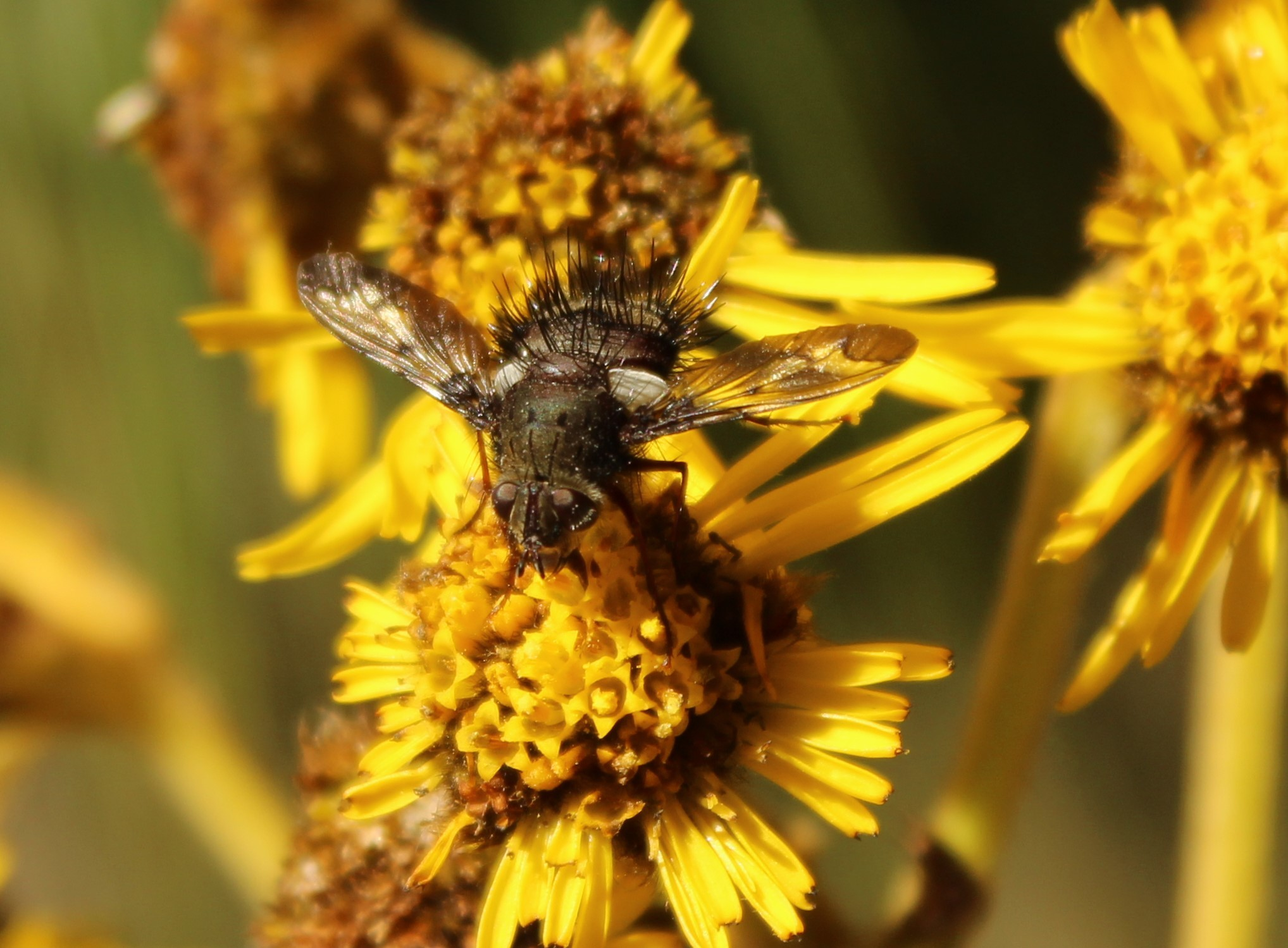

Scientific classification
- Kingdom: Animalia
- Phylum: Arthropoda
- Class: Insecta
- Order: Diptera
- Family: Tachinidae
- Subfamily: Tachininae
- Tribe: Tachinini
- Genus: Echinopyrrhosia; Townsend, 1914

Type species
- Echinopyrrhosia alpina Townsend, 1914

= Echinopyrrhosia =

Genus of flies

Echinopyrrhosia is a genus of flies in the family Tachinidae.

== Species ==
- Echinopyrrhosia alpina Townsend, 1914
- Echinopyrrhosia arrogans Reinhard, 1975
- Echinopyrrhosia atypica Townsend, 1914
- Echinopyrrhosia browni Curran, 1941
- Echinopyrrhosia melanica Townsend, 1914
- Echinopyrrhosia pellacis Reinhard, 1975
- Echinopyrrhosia pictipennis Curran, 1941
- Echinopyrrhosia trophocyon Aldrich, 1928
- Echinopyrrhosia varia (Walker, 1853)
