= Epicuphocera =

Scientific classification
- Kingdom: Animalia
- Phylum: Arthropoda
- Class: Insecta
- Order: Diptera
- Family: Tachinidae
- Subfamily: Tachininae
- Tribe: Tachinini
- Genus: Epicuphocera; Townsend, 1927

Type species
- Epicuphocera andina Townsend, 1927

Genus of flies

Epicuphocera is a genus of flies in the family Tachinidae.

== Species ==
- Epicuphocera andina Townsend, 1927

== Distribution ==
Peru
