= Vertepalpus =

Scientific classification
- Kingdom: Animalia
- Phylum: Arthropoda
- Class: Insecta
- Order: Diptera
- Family: Tachinidae
- Subfamily: Tachininae
- Tribe: Tachinini
- Genus: Vertepalpus; Curran, 1947

Type species
- Vertepalpus verdans Curran, 1947

Genus of flies

Vertepalpus is a genus of flies in the family Tachinidae.

== Species ==
- Vertepalpus verdans Curran, 1947

== Distribution ==
Ecuador
