= Helioprosopa facialis =

Scientific classification
- Domain: Eukaryota
- Kingdom: Animalia
- Phylum: Arthropoda
- Class: Insecta
- Order: Diptera
- Family: Tachinidae
- Genus: Helioprosopa
- Species: H. facialis

Binomial name
- Helioprosopa facialis Townsend, 1927

Species of fly

Helioprosopa facialis is a species of tachinid flies in the genus Helioprosopa of the family Tachinidae.
