= Comopsis =

Scientific classification
- Kingdom: Animalia
- Phylum: Arthropoda
- Class: Insecta
- Order: Diptera
- Family: Tachinidae
- Subfamily: Tachininae
- Tribe: Tachinini
- Genus: Comopsis; Cortés, 1986

Type species
- Comopsis regale Cortés, 1986

Genus of flies

Comopsis is a genus of flies in the family Tachinidae.

== Distribution ==
Chile

== Species ==
- Comopsis regale Cortés, 1986
