= Macrojurinia =

Scientific classification
- Kingdom: Animalia
- Phylum: Arthropoda
- Class: Insecta
- Order: Diptera
- Family: Tachinidae
- Subfamily: Tachininae
- Tribe: Tachinini
- Genus: Macrojurinia; Townsend, 1916

Type species
- Jurinia brasiliensis Robineau-Desvoidy, 1830

Genus of flies

Macrojurinia is a genus of flies in the family Tachinidae.

== Species ==
- Macrojurinia brasiliensis (Robineau-Desvoidy, 1830)

== Distribution ==
Brazil
