= Acuphoceropsis =

Scientific classification
- Kingdom: Animalia
- Phylum: Arthropoda
- Class: Insecta
- Order: Diptera
- Family: Tachinidae
- Subfamily: Tachininae
- Tribe: Tachinini
- Genus: Acuphoceropsis; Blanchard, 1943

Type species
- Acuphoceropsis nigricornis Blanchard, 1943

Genus of flies

Acuphoceropsis is a genus of flies in the family Tachinidae.

== Species ==
- Acuphoceropsis nigricornis Blanchard, 1943
