= Diaphanomyia =

Scientific classification
- Kingdom: Animalia
- Phylum: Arthropoda
- Class: Insecta
- Order: Diptera
- Family: Tachinidae
- Subfamily: Tachininae
- Tribe: Tachinini
- Genus: Diaphanomyia; Townsend, 1917

Type species
- Diaphanomyia aurea Townsend, 1917

Synonyms
- Xanthozonella Townsend, 1927

Genus of flies

Diaphanomyia is a genus of flies in the family Tachinidae.

== Species ==
- Diaphanomyia aurea Townsend, 1917
- Diaphanomyia aurifacies (Robineau-Desvoidy, 1830)
- Diaphanomyia ludens (Walker, 1860)
