= Cryptopalpus =

Scientific classification
- Kingdom: Animalia
- Phylum: Arthropoda
- Class: Insecta
- Order: Diptera
- Family: Tachinidae
- Subfamily: Tachininae
- Tribe: Tachinini
- Genus: Cryptopalpus; Rondani, 1850

Type species
- Micropalpus ornatus Macquart, 1844

Synonyms
- Euquadratosoma Townsend, 1915; Saundersia Schiner, 1868

Genus of flies

Cryptopalpus is a genus of flies in the family Tachinidae.

== Species ==
- Cryptopalpus aequabilis (Walker, 1849)
- Cryptopalpus discalis (Brèthes, 1909)
- Cryptopalpus harpezus (Reinhard, 1952)
- Cryptopalpus marginalis (Brèthes, 1909)
- Cryptopalpus metallicus (Curran, 1947)
- Cryptopalpus nigricornis (Townsend, 1914)
- Cryptopalpus nigriventris (Macquart, 1844)
- Cryptopalpus ornatus (Macquart, 1844)
- Cryptopalpus ruber (Townsend, 1915)
- Cryptopalpus rufiventris (Macquart, 1846)
- Cryptopalpus semiater (Schiner, 1868)
- Cryptopalpus transiens (Walker, 1849)
- Cryptopalpus transversus (Walker, 1853)
