= Erythroepalpus =

Scientific classification
- Kingdom: Animalia
- Phylum: Arthropoda
- Class: Insecta
- Order: Diptera
- Family: Tachinidae
- Subfamily: Tachininae
- Tribe: Tachinini
- Genus: Erythroepalpus; Townsend, 1931

Type species
- Erythroepalpus aurantiacus Townsend, 1931

Genus of flies

Erythroepalpus is a genus of flies in the family Tachinidae.

== Distribution ==
Mexico

== Species ==
- Erythroepalpus aurantiacus Townsend, 1931
