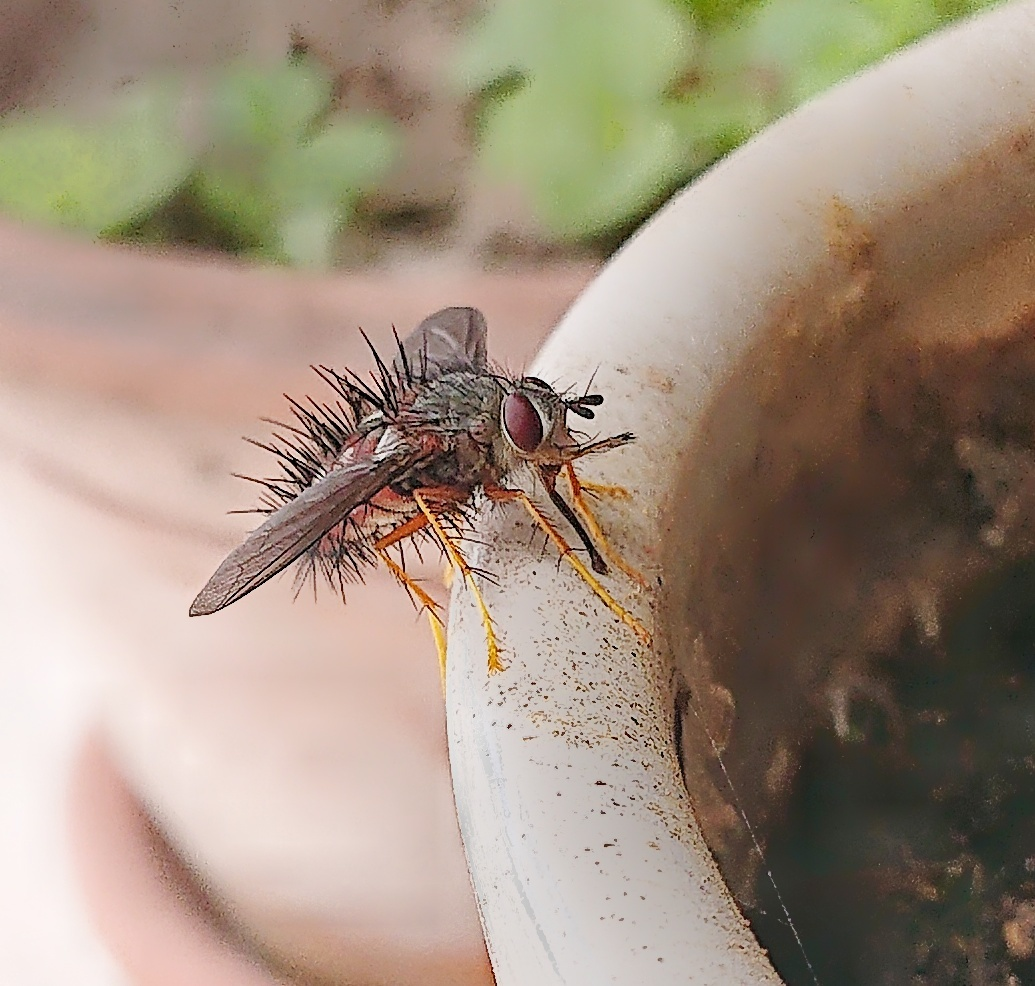

Scientific classification
- Kingdom: Animalia
- Phylum: Arthropoda
- Clade: Pancrustacea
- Class: Insecta
- Order: Diptera
- Family: Tachinidae
- Subfamily: Tachininae
- Tribe: Tachinini
- Genus: Eulasiopalpus; Townsend, 1913

Type species
- Lasiopalpus albipes Townsend, 1913

= Eulasiopalpus =

Genus of flies

Eulasiopalpus is a genus of flies in the family Tachinidae.

== Species ==
- Eulasiopalpus albipes (Townsend, 1913)
- Eulasiopalpus corpulentus Townsend, 1914
- Eulasiopalpus gertschi Curran, 1947
- Eulasiopalpus mirimodis Reinhard, 1975
- Eulasiopalpus niveus Townsend, 1914
- Eulasiopalpus obscurus Townsend, 1914
- Eulasiopalpus subalpinus Townsend, 1912
- Eulasiopalpus tatei Curran, 1947
- Eulasiopalpus typicus Curran, 1947
- Eulasiopalpus vittatus Curran, 1947
