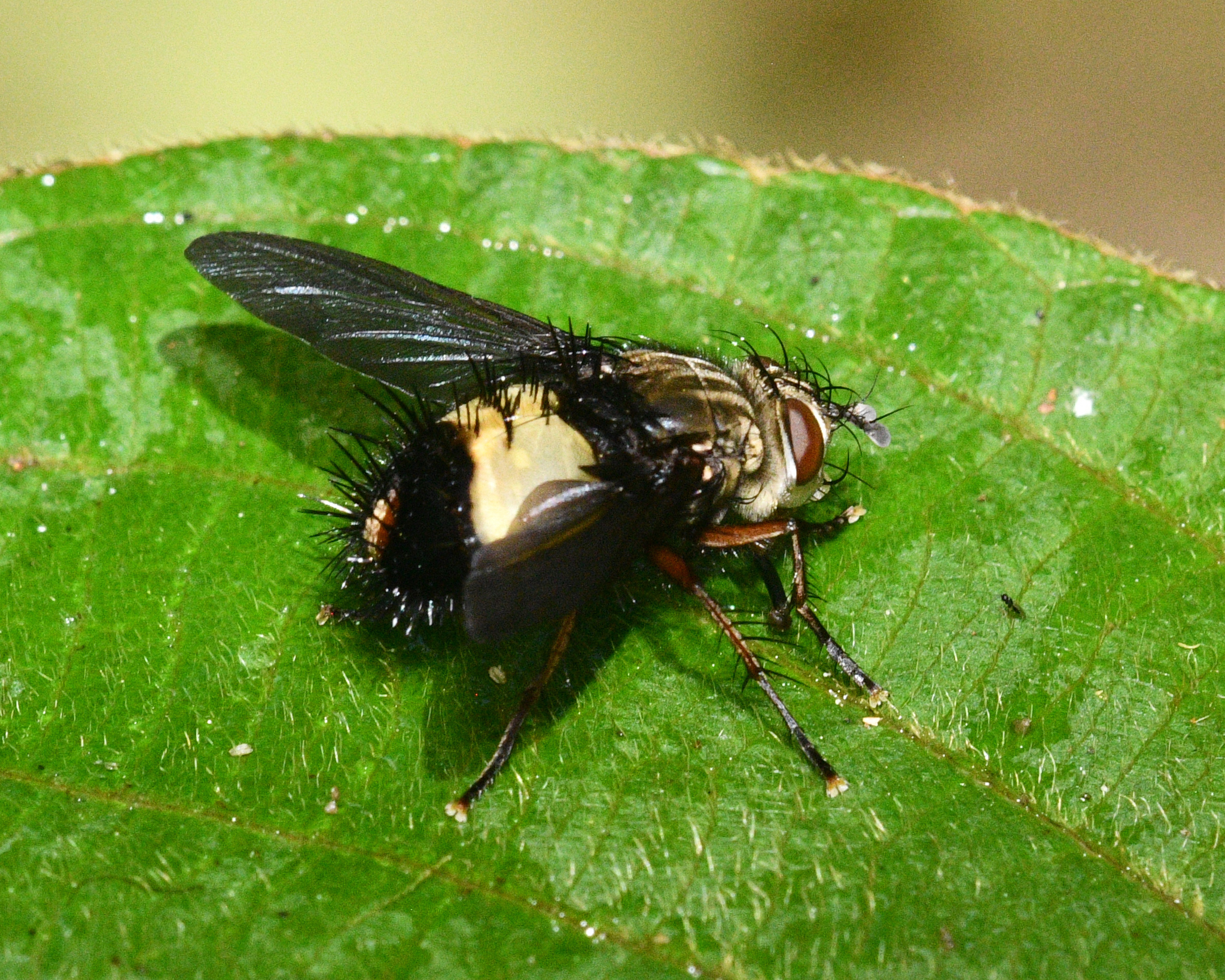

Scientific classification
- Kingdom: Animalia
- Phylum: Arthropoda
- Clade: Pancrustacea
- Class: Insecta
- Order: Diptera
- Family: Tachinidae
- Tribe: Tachinini
- Genus: Xanthoepalpodes; Townsend, 1931
- Species: X. bischofi

Binomial name
- Xanthoepalpodes bischofi Townsend, 1931

= Xanthoepalpodes =

Xanthoepalpodes bischofi

Genus of flies

Xanthoepalpodes is a genus of flies in the family Tachinidae. It is monotypic, being represented by the single species Xanthoepalpodes bischofi which is found in Bolivia.
