= Mesnilisca =

Scientific classification
- Kingdom: Animalia
- Phylum: Arthropoda
- Class: Insecta
- Order: Diptera
- Family: Tachinidae
- Subfamily: Tachininae
- Tribe: Tachinini
- Genus: Mesnilisca; Zimin, 1974

Type species
- Mesnilisca trivittata Zimin, 1974

Genus of flies

Mesnilisca is a genus of flies in the family Tachinidae.

== Species ==
- Mesnilisca trivittata Zimin, 1974
