= Epalpodes =

Scientific classification
- Kingdom: Animalia
- Phylum: Arthropoda
- Class: Insecta
- Order: Diptera
- Family: Tachinidae
- Subfamily: Tachininae
- Tribe: Tachinini
- Genus: Epalpodes; Townsend, 1912

Type species
- Epalpodes equatorialis Townsend, 1912

Genus of flies

Epalpodes is a genus of flies in the family Tachinidae.

== Species ==
- Epalpodes albolineatus (Macquart, 1855)
- Epalpodes chillanensis Cortés, 1951
- Epalpodes equatorialis Townsend, 1912
- Epalpodes malloi Cortés & Campos, 1971
- Epalpodes vittatus (Walker, 1853)
