= Cyanopsis (fly) =

Scientific classification
- Kingdom: Animalia
- Phylum: Arthropoda
- Class: Insecta
- Order: Diptera
- Family: Tachinidae
- Subfamily: Tachininae
- Tribe: Tachinini
- Genus: Cyanopsis; Townsend, 1917

Type species
- Cyanopsis costalis Townsend, 1917

Genus of flies

Cyanopsis is a genus of flies in the family Tachinidae.

== Distribution ==
Brazil

== Species ==
- Cyanopsis costalimai Guimarães, 1964
- Cyanopsis costalis Townsend, 1917
