= Tothillia =

Scientific classification
- Kingdom: Animalia
- Phylum: Arthropoda
- Class: Insecta
- Order: Diptera
- Family: Tachinidae
- Subfamily: Tachininae
- Tribe: Tachinini
- Genus: Tothillia; Crosskey, 1976

Type species
- Chaetoplagia asiatica Tothill, 1918

Genus of flies

Tothillia is a genus of flies in the family Tachinidae.

== Species ==
- Tothillia asiatica (Tothill, 1918)
- Tothillia sinensis Chao & Zhou, 1993
