= Homosaundersia =

Scientific classification
- Kingdom: Animalia
- Phylum: Arthropoda
- Class: Insecta
- Order: Diptera
- Family: Tachinidae
- Subfamily: Tachininae
- Tribe: Tachinini
- Genus: Homosaundersia; Townsend, 1931

Type species
- Saundersia rufa Schiner, 1868

Genus of flies

Homosaundersia is a genus of flies in the family Tachinidae.

== Species ==
- Homosaundersia rufa (Schiner, 1868)

== Distribution ==
Ecuador
