= Parechinotachina =

Scientific classification
- Kingdom: Animalia
- Phylum: Arthropoda
- Class: Insecta
- Order: Diptera
- Family: Tachinidae
- Subfamily: Tachininae
- Tribe: Tachinini
- Genus: Parechinotachina; Townsend, 1931

Type species
- Dejeania plumitarsis Wulp, 1886

Genus of flies

Parechinotachina is a genus of flies in the family Tachinidae.

== Species ==
- Parechinotachina plumitarsis (Wulp, 1886)

== Distribution ==
Costa Rica, Guatemala, Mexico.
