= Chrysomikia =

Scientific classification
- Kingdom: Animalia
- Phylum: Arthropoda
- Class: Insecta
- Order: Diptera
- Family: Tachinidae
- Subfamily: Tachininae
- Tribe: Tachinini
- Genus: Chrysomikia; Mesnil, 1970

Type species
- Eudoromyia grahami Villeneuve, 1936

Genus of flies

Chrysomikia is a genus of flies in the family Tachinidae.

== Species ==
- Chrysomikia grahami (Villeneuve, 1936)
- Chrysomikia viridicapitis Chao & Zhou, 1987
