= Sericotachina =

Scientific classification
- Kingdom: Animalia
- Phylum: Arthropoda
- Class: Insecta
- Order: Diptera
- Family: Tachinidae
- Subfamily: Tachininae
- Tribe: Tachinini
- Genus: Sericotachina; Townsend, 1916

Type species
- Paratachina vulpecula Wulp, 1896

Synonyms
- Servillina Malloch, 1932; Wulpitachina Villeneuve, 1934

Genus of flies

Sericotachina is a genus of flies in the family Tachinidae.

== Species ==
- Sericotachina vulpecula (Wulp, 1896)

== Distribution ==
Java, Malaysia.
