= Euempheremyia =

Scientific classification
- Kingdom: Animalia
- Phylum: Arthropoda
- Class: Insecta
- Order: Diptera
- Family: Tachinidae
- Subfamily: Tachininae
- Tribe: Tachinini
- Genus: Euempheremyia; Townsend, 1927

Type species
- Euempheremyia paulensis Townsend, 1927

Genus of flies

Euempheremyia is a genus of flies in the family Tachinidae.

== Species ==
- Euempheremyia albuquerquei Guimarães, 1963
- Euempheremyia elyowaldi Guimarães, 1963
- Euempheremyia melotris Reinhard, 1975
- Euempheremyia paulensis Townsend, 1927

== Distribution ==
Brazil.
