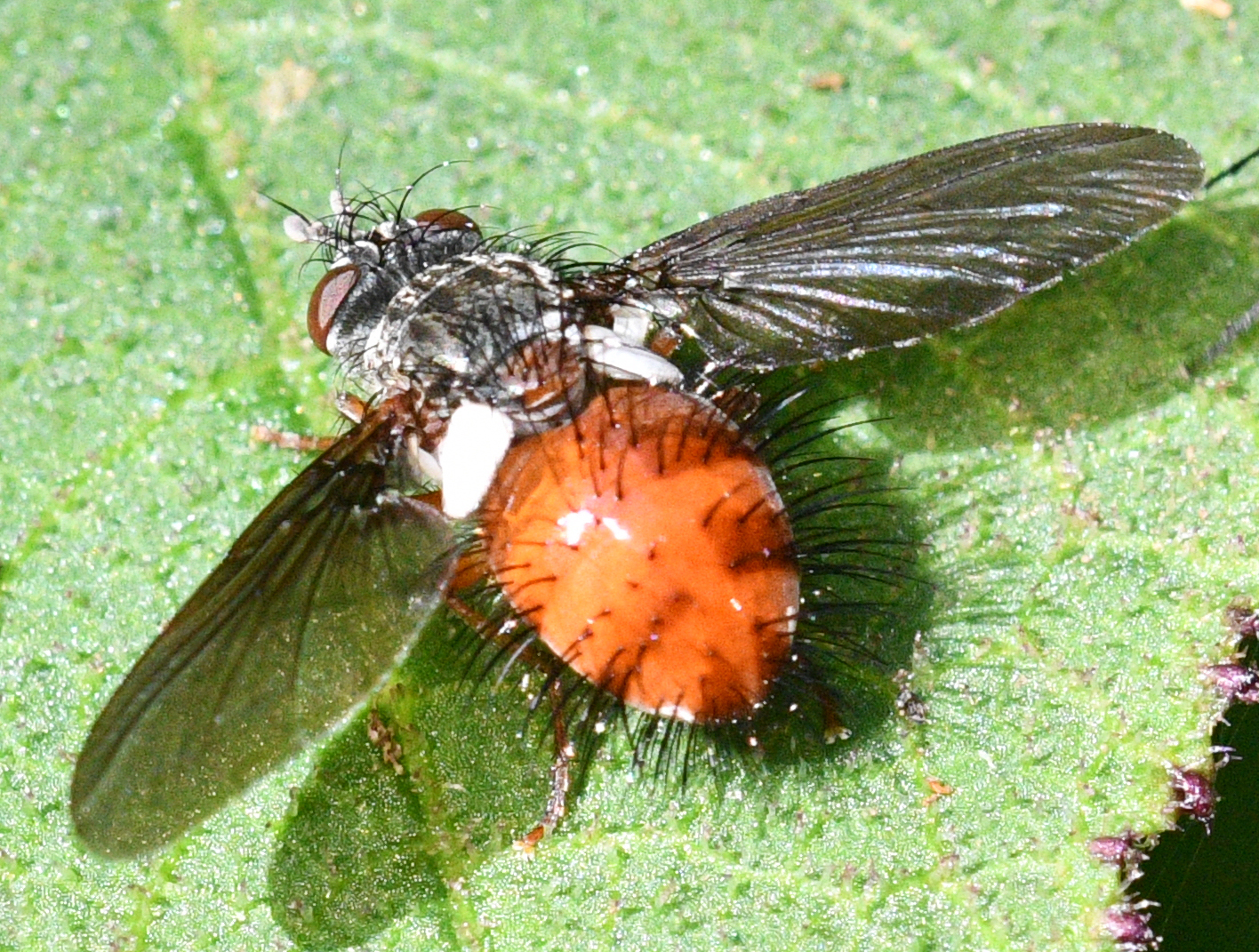

Scientific classification
- Kingdom: Animalia
- Phylum: Arthropoda
- Clade: Pancrustacea
- Class: Insecta
- Order: Diptera
- Family: Tachinidae
- Tribe: Tachinini
- Genus: Epalpellus; Townsend, 1914
- Species: E. corpulentus

Binomial name
- Epalpellus corpulentus Townsend]], 1914

= Epalpellus =

Epalpellus corpulentus

Genus of flies

Epalpellus is a genus of flies in the family Tachinidae. It is monotypic, being represented by the single species Epalpellus corpulentus. It is found in Peru.
