= Euepalpodes =

Scientific classification
- Kingdom: Animalia
- Phylum: Arthropoda
- Clade: Pancrustacea
- Class: Insecta
- Order: Diptera
- Family: Tachinidae
- Subfamily: Tachininae
- Tribe: Tachinini
- Genus: Euepalpodes; Townsend, 1915

Type species
- Euepalpodes arcuatus Townsend, 1915

Genus of flies

Euepalpodes is a genus of flies in the family Tachinidae.

== Species ==
- Euepalpodes arcuatus Townsend, 1915

== Distribution ==
Peru
