= Fabriciopsis =

Scientific classification
- Kingdom: Animalia
- Phylum: Arthropoda
- Clade: Pancrustacea
- Class: Insecta
- Order: Diptera
- Family: Tachinidae
- Subfamily: Tachininae
- Tribe: Tachinini
- Genus: Fabriciopsis; Townsend, 1914

Type species
- Fabriciopsis hystrix Townsend, 1914

Genus of flies

Fabriciopsis is a genus of flies in the family Tachinidae.

== Species ==
- Fabriciopsis argentinensis Blanchard, 1941 (Argentina)
- Fabriciopsis hystrix Townsend, 1914 (Peru)
