= Saundersiops =

Scientific classification
- Kingdom: Animalia
- Phylum: Arthropoda
- Class: Insecta
- Order: Diptera
- Family: Tachinidae
- Subfamily: Tachininae
- Tribe: Tachinini
- Genus: Saundersiops; Townsend, 1914

Type species
- Saundersiops confluens Townsend, 1914

Synonyms
- Signoepalpus Townsend, 1931

Genus of flies

Saundersiops is a genus of flies in the family Tachinidae.

== Species ==
- Saundersiops brownae Curran, 1947
- Saundersiops cayensis Townsend, 1914
- Saundersiops colombiensis Curran, 1947
- Saundersiops confluens Townsend, 1914
- Saundersiops cruciatus Townsend, 1914
- Saundersiops discalis (Townsend, 1914)
- Saundersiops maculiventris (Brèthes, 1909)
- Saundersiops oculatus Curran, 1947
- Saundersiops pachecoi Curran, 1947
- Saundersiops schwarzi Curran, 1947
- Saundersiops siestus Curran, 1947
- Saundersiops simillimus Townsend, 1914
- Saundersiops spinosus (Townsend, 1931)
- Saundersiops tatei Curran, 1947
