= Helioprosopa electilis =

Scientific classification
- Kingdom: Animalia
- Phylum: Arthropoda
- Clade: Pancrustacea
- Class: Insecta
- Order: Diptera
- Family: Tachinidae
- Genus: Helioprosopa
- Species: H. electilis

Binomial name
- Helioprosopa electilis Reinhard, 1964

Species of fly

Helioprosopa electilis is a species of tachinid flies in the genus Helioprosopa of the family Tachinidae.
