= Platyschineria =

Scientific classification
- Kingdom: Animalia
- Phylum: Arthropoda
- Class: Insecta
- Order: Diptera
- Family: Tachinidae
- Subfamily: Tachininae
- Tribe: Tachinini
- Genus: Platyschineria; Villeneuve, 1942

Type species
- Platyschineria cuthbertsoni Villeneuve, 1942

Genus of flies

Platyschineria is a genus of flies in the family Tachinidae.

== Species ==
- Platyschineria cuthbertsoni Villeneuve, 1942

== Distribution ==
Kenya, South Africa, Tanzania, Zimbabwe.
