= Itacuphocera =

Scientific classification
- Kingdom: Animalia
- Phylum: Arthropoda
- Class: Insecta
- Order: Diptera
- Family: Tachinidae
- Subfamily: Tachininae
- Tribe: Tachinini
- Genus: Itacuphocera; Townsend, 1927

Type species
- Itacuphocera ocellaris Townsend, 1927

Genus of flies

Itacuphocera is a genus of flies in the family Tachinidae.

== Species ==
- Itacuphocera borgmeieri Guimarães, 1964
- Itacuphocera carrerai Guimarães, 1964
- Itacuphocera ocellaris Townsend, 1927

== Distribution ==
Brazil
