= Gymnommopsis =

Scientific classification
- Kingdom: Animalia
- Phylum: Arthropoda
- Class: Insecta
- Order: Diptera
- Family: Tachinidae
- Subfamily: Tachininae
- Tribe: Tachinini
- Genus: Gymnommopsis; Townsend, 1927

Synonyms
- Gymnocuphocera Blanchard, 1943; Metagymnopsis Blanchard, 1943

Genus of flies

Gymnommopsis is a genus of flies in the family Tachinidae.

== Species ==
- Gymnommopsis cordubensis (Blanchard, 1943)
- Gymnommopsis gagtea Townsend, 1927
- Gymnommopsis haywardi (Blanchard, 1943)
- Gymnommopsis misionensis (Blanchard, 1943)
