= Gigantoepalpus =

Scientific classification
- Kingdom: Animalia
- Phylum: Arthropoda
- Class: Insecta
- Order: Diptera
- Family: Tachinidae
- Subfamily: Tachininae
- Tribe: Tachinini
- Genus: Gigantoepalpus; Townsend, 1913

Type species
- Gigantoepalpus heros Townsend, 1913

Genus of flies

Gigantoepalpus is a genus of flies in the family Tachinidae.

== Species ==
- Gigantoepalpus heros Townsend, 1931

== Distribution ==
Venezuela.
