= Dejeaniops =

Scientific classification
- Kingdom: Animalia
- Phylum: Arthropoda
- Class: Insecta
- Order: Diptera
- Family: Tachinidae
- Subfamily: Tachininae
- Tribe: Tachinini
- Genus: Dejeaniops; Townsend, 1913

Type species
- Dejeaniops ollacheus Townsend, 1913

Genus of flies

Dejeaniops is a genus of flies in the family Tachinidae.

== Species ==
- Dejeaniops beckeri Engel, 1920
- Dejeaniops fallaciosus Engel, 1920
- Dejeaniops ollacheus Townsend, 1913
