= Beskiocephala =

Scientific classification
- Kingdom: Animalia
- Phylum: Arthropoda
- Class: Insecta
- Order: Diptera
- Family: Tachinidae
- Subfamily: Tachininae
- Tribe: Tachinini
- Genus: Beskiocephala; Townsend, 1916

Type species
- Beskiocephala flava Townsend, 1916

Genus of flies

Beskiocephala is a genus of flies in the family Tachinidae.

== Distribution ==
Brazil.

== Species ==
- Beskiocephala flava Townsend, 1916
