= Corpulentoepalpus =

Scientific classification
- Kingdom: Animalia
- Phylum: Arthropoda
- Class: Insecta
- Order: Diptera
- Family: Tachinidae
- Subfamily: Tachininae
- Tribe: Tachinini
- Genus: Corpulentoepalpus; Townsend, 1927

Type species
- Corpulentoepalpus rufus Townsend, 1927

Genus of flies

Corpulentoepalpus is a genus of flies in the family Tachinidae.

== Distribution ==
Brazil

== Species ==
- Corpulentoepalpus rufus Townsend, 1927
