= Austeniops =

Scientific classification
- Kingdom: Animalia
- Phylum: Arthropoda
- Class: Insecta
- Order: Diptera
- Family: Tachinidae
- Subfamily: Tachininae
- Tribe: Tachinini
- Genus: Austeniops; Townsend, 1915

Type species
- Saundersia truncaticornis Wulp, 1888

Genus of flies

Austeniops is a genus of flies in the family Tachinidae.

== Distribution ==
Costa Rica, Panama

== Species ==
- Austeniops truncaticornis (Wulp, 1888)
