= Euhuascaraya =

Scientific classification
- Kingdom: Animalia
- Phylum: Arthropoda
- Class: Insecta
- Order: Diptera
- Family: Tachinidae
- Subfamily: Tachininae
- Tribe: Tachinini
- Genus: Euhuascaraya; Townsend, 1927

Type species
- Euhuascaraya atra Townsend, 1927

Genus of flies

Euhuascaraya is a genus of flies in the family Tachinidae.

== Species ==
- Euhuascaraya atra Townsend, 1927
- Euhuascaraya media Curran, 1947
- Euhuascaraya nemo Curran, 1947
- Euhuascaraya siesta Curran, 1947

== Distribution ==
Brazil.
