= Schineria =

Scientific classification
- Kingdom: Animalia
- Phylum: Arthropoda
- Class: Insecta
- Order: Diptera
- Family: Tachinidae
- Subfamily: Tachininae
- Tribe: Tachinini
- Genus: Schineria; Rondani, 1857

Type species
- Schineria tergestina Rondani, 1857

Genus of flies

Schineria is a genus of flies in the family Tachinidae.

== Species ==
- Schineria gobica Zimin, 1947
- Schineria majae Zimin, 1947
- Schineria nigriventris Kolomiets, 1984
- Schineria tergestina Rondani, 1857
