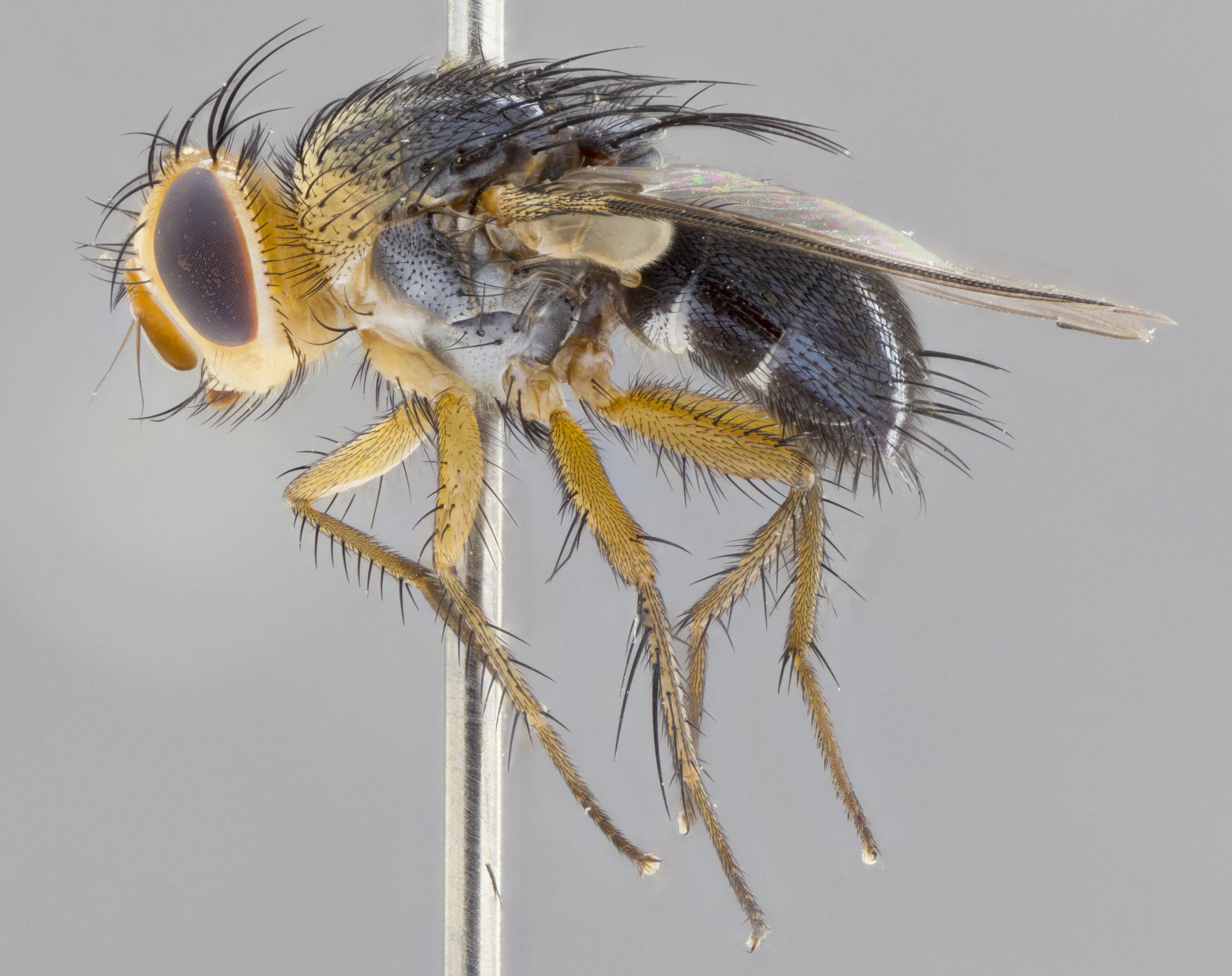
- Phosocephala alexanderi lateral view

Scientific classification
- Kingdom: Animalia
- Phylum: Arthropoda
- Class: Insecta
- Order: Diptera
- Family: Tachinidae
- Subfamily: Tachininae
- Tribe: Tachinini
- Genus: Phosocephala; Townsend, 1908

Type species
- Phosocephala metallica Townsend, 1908

Synonyms
- Phosococephala Coquillett, 1910

= Phosocephala =

Genus of flies

Phosocephala is a genus of flies in the family Tachinidae.

== Species ==
- Phosocephala alexanderi Fleming & Wood, 2016
- Phosocephala metallica Townsend, 1908

== Distribution ==
Costa Rica.
