= Microgymnomma =

Scientific classification
- Kingdom: Animalia
- Phylum: Arthropoda
- Class: Insecta
- Order: Diptera
- Family: Tachinidae
- Subfamily: Tachininae
- Tribe: Tachinini
- Genus: Microgymnomma; Townsend, 1916

Type species
- Microgymnomma orbitalis Townsend, 1916

Genus of flies

Microgymnomma is a genus of flies in the family Tachinidae.

== Species ==
- Microgymnomma orbitalis Townsend, 1916
- Microgymnomma paulensis Townsend, 1929
