= Trypherina =

Scientific classification
- Kingdom: Animalia
- Phylum: Arthropoda
- Class: Insecta
- Order: Diptera
- Family: Tachinidae
- Subfamily: Tachininae
- Tribe: Tachinini
- Genus: Trypherina; Malloch, 1938

Type species
- Trypherina grisea Malloch, 1938

Genus of flies

Trypherina is a genus of flies in the family Tachinidae. The sole member, Trypherina grisea, is endemic to New Zealand.
