= Exopalpus =

Scientific classification
- Kingdom: Animalia
- Phylum: Arthropoda
- Class: Insecta
- Order: Diptera
- Family: Tachinidae
- Subfamily: Tachininae
- Tribe: Tachinini
- Genus: Exopalpus; Macquart, 1851

Type species
- Exopalpus bicolor Macquart, 1851

Synonyms
- Arthrochaeta Bergenstamm, 1889; Eurythiopsis Townsend, 1914; Microtrichommodes Townsend, 1927

Genus of flies

Exopalpus is a genus of flies in the family Tachinidae.

== Species ==
- Exopalpus bicolor Macquart, 1851
- Exopalpus demoticoides (Brauer & Bergenstamm, 1889)
- Exopalpus elegans (Townsend, 1927)
- Exopalpus forreri (Wulp, 1894)
- Exopalpus infuscatus (Wulp, 1888)
- Exopalpus intermedius (Wulp, 1890)
- Exopalpus minor (Curran, 1925)
- Exopalpus notatus (Bigot, 1888)
