= Trichosaundersia =

Scientific classification
- Kingdom: Animalia
- Phylum: Arthropoda
- Class: Insecta
- Order: Diptera
- Family: Tachinidae
- Subfamily: Tachininae
- Tribe: Tachinini
- Genus: Trichosaundersia; Townsend, 1914

Type species
- Trichosaundersia lineata Townsend, 1914

Genus of flies

Trichosaundersia is a genus of flies in the family Tachinidae.

== Species ==
- Trichosaundersia callithrix Reinhard, 1975
- Trichosaundersia dorsopunctata (Macquart, 1844)
- Trichosaundersia lineata Townsend, 1914
- Trichosaundersia nora Curran, 1947
- Trichosaundersia rubripila (Rondani, 1850)
- Trichosaundersia rufopilosa (Wulp, 1888)
