= Formicomyia =

Scientific classification
- Kingdom: Animalia
- Phylum: Arthropoda
- Class: Insecta
- Order: Diptera
- Family: Tachinidae
- Subfamily: Tachininae
- Tribe: Tachinini
- Genus: Formicomyia; Townsend, 1916

Type species
- Formicomyia ovata Townsend, 1916

Genus of flies

Formicomyia is a genus of flies in the family Tachinidae.

== Species ==
- Formicomyia ovata Townsend, 1916

== Distribution ==
Brazil.
