= Corpulentosoma =

Scientific classification
- Kingdom: Animalia
- Phylum: Arthropoda
- Class: Insecta
- Order: Diptera
- Family: Tachinidae
- Subfamily: Tachininae
- Tribe: Tachinini
- Genus: Corpulentosoma; Townsend, 1914

Type species
- Corpulentosoma cornutum Townsend, 1914

Genus of flies

Corpulentosoma is a genus of flies in the family Tachinidae.

== Species ==
- Corpulentosoma cornutum Townsend, 1914

== Distribution ==
Peru
