= Eumelanepalpus =

Scientific classification
- Kingdom: Animalia
- Phylum: Arthropoda
- Class: Insecta
- Order: Diptera
- Family: Tachinidae
- Subfamily: Tachininae
- Tribe: Tachinini
- Genus: Eumelanepalpus; Townsend, 1915

Type species
- Eumelanepalpus ruber Townsend, 1915

Genus of flies

Eumelanepalpus is a genus of flies in the family Tachinidae.

== Species ==
- Eumelanepalpus ruber Townsend, 1915

== Distribution ==
Peru
