= Signosomopsis =

Scientific classification
- Kingdom: Animalia
- Phylum: Arthropoda
- Class: Insecta
- Order: Diptera
- Family: Tachinidae
- Subfamily: Tachininae
- Tribe: Tachinini
- Genus: Signosomopsis; Townsend, 1914

Type species
- Signosomopsis argentea Townsend, 1914

Genus of flies

Signosomopsis is a genus of flies in the family Tachinidae.

== Species ==
- Signosomopsis argentea Townsend, 1914
- Signosomopsis eronis Curran, 1929
- Signosomopsis townsendi Curran, 1929

== Distribution ==
Peru.
