= Neocuphocera =

Scientific classification
- Kingdom: Animalia
- Phylum: Arthropoda
- Class: Insecta
- Order: Diptera
- Family: Tachinidae
- Subfamily: Tachininae
- Tribe: Tachinini
- Genus: Neocuphocera; Townsend, 1927

Type species
- Neocuphocera nepos Townsend, 1927

Synonyms
- Myocuphocera Townsend, 1931

Genus of flies

Neocuphocera is a genus of flies in the family Tachinidae.

== Species ==
- Neocuphocera nepos Townsend, 1927
- Neocuphocera orbitalis (Aldrich, 1929)
