= Echinopyrrhosiops =

Scientific classification
- Kingdom: Animalia
- Phylum: Arthropoda
- Class: Insecta
- Order: Diptera
- Family: Tachinidae
- Subfamily: Tachininae
- Tribe: Tachinini
- Genus: Echinopyrrhosiops; Townsend, 1931

Type species
- Saundersia decorata Townsend, 1931

Genus of flies

Echinopyrrhosiops is a genus of flies in the family Tachinidae.

== Species ==
- Echinopyrrhosiops decoratus (Townsend, 1931)

== Distribution ==
Bolivia
