= Steatosoma =

Scientific classification
- Kingdom: Animalia
- Phylum: Arthropoda
- Clade: Pancrustacea
- Class: Insecta
- Order: Diptera
- Family: Tachinidae
- Subfamily: Tachininae
- Tribe: Tachinini
- Genus: Steatosoma; Aldrich, 1934

Type species
- Steatosoma rufiventris Aldrich, 1934

Genus of flies

Steatosoma is a genus of flies in the family Tachinidae.

== Species ==
- Steatosoma nigriventris Aldrich, 1934
- Steatosoma rufiventris Aldrich, 1934

== Distribution ==
Argentina, Chile.
