= Xanthozona =

Scientific classification
- Kingdom: Animalia
- Phylum: Arthropoda
- Class: Insecta
- Order: Diptera
- Family: Tachinidae
- Subfamily: Tachininae
- Tribe: Tachinini
- Genus: Xanthozona; Townsend, 1908

Type species
- Tachina melanopyga Wiedemann, 1830

Genus of flies

Xanthozona is a genus of flies in the family Tachinidae.

== Species ==
- Xanthozona melanopyga (Wiedemann, 1830)
- Xanthozona scutellaris (Robineau-Desvoidy, 1830)
