= Eufabriciopsis =

Scientific classification
- Kingdom: Animalia
- Phylum: Arthropoda
- Clade: Pancrustacea
- Class: Insecta
- Order: Diptera
- Family: Tachinidae
- Subfamily: Tachininae
- Tribe: Tachinini
- Genus: Eufabriciopsis; Townsend, 1915

Type species
- Gymnomma quadrisetosa Coquillett, 1902

Genus of flies

Eufabriciopsis is a genus of flies in the family Tachinidae. It contains a sole species Eufabriciopsis quadrisetosa.

== Distribution ==
Mexico
