= Pseudoxanthozona =

Scientific classification
- Kingdom: Animalia
- Phylum: Arthropoda
- Class: Insecta
- Order: Diptera
- Family: Tachinidae
- Subfamily: Tachininae
- Tribe: Tachinini
- Genus: Pseudoxanthozona; Townsend, 1931

Type species
- Pseudoxanthozona denudata Townsend, 1931

Genus of flies

Pseudoxanthozona is a genus of flies in the family Tachinidae.

== Species ==
- Pseudoxanthozona denudata Townsend, 1931

== Distribution ==
Venezuela.
