= Dumerillia =

Scientific classification
- Kingdom: Animalia
- Phylum: Arthropoda
- Class: Insecta
- Order: Diptera
- Family: Tachinidae
- Subfamily: Tachininae
- Tribe: Tachinini
- Genus: Dumerillia; Robineau-Desvoidy, 1830

Type species
- Dumerillia rubida Robineau-Desvoidy, 1830

Synonyms
- Dumerilia Macquart, 1835; Tuberculocera Townsend, 1927

Genus of flies

Dumerillia is a genus of flies in the family Tachinidae.

== Species ==
- Dumerillia etythrina (Bigot, 1888)
- Dumerillia rubida Robineau-Desvoidy, 1830

== Distribution ==
Brazil
