= Talarocera =

Scientific classification
- Kingdom: Animalia
- Phylum: Arthropoda
- Class: Insecta
- Order: Diptera
- Family: Tachinidae
- Subfamily: Tachininae
- Tribe: Tachinini
- Genus: Talarocera; Williston, 1887

Type species
- Talacocera smithii Williston, 1887

Synonyms
- Talacocera Wulp, 1895; Talacrocera Brauer & von Bergenstamm, 1891

Genus of flies

Talacocera is a genus of flies in the family Tachinidae.

== Species ==
- Talacocera nigripennis (Wiedemann, 1830)

== Distribution ==
Brazil, Paraguay.
