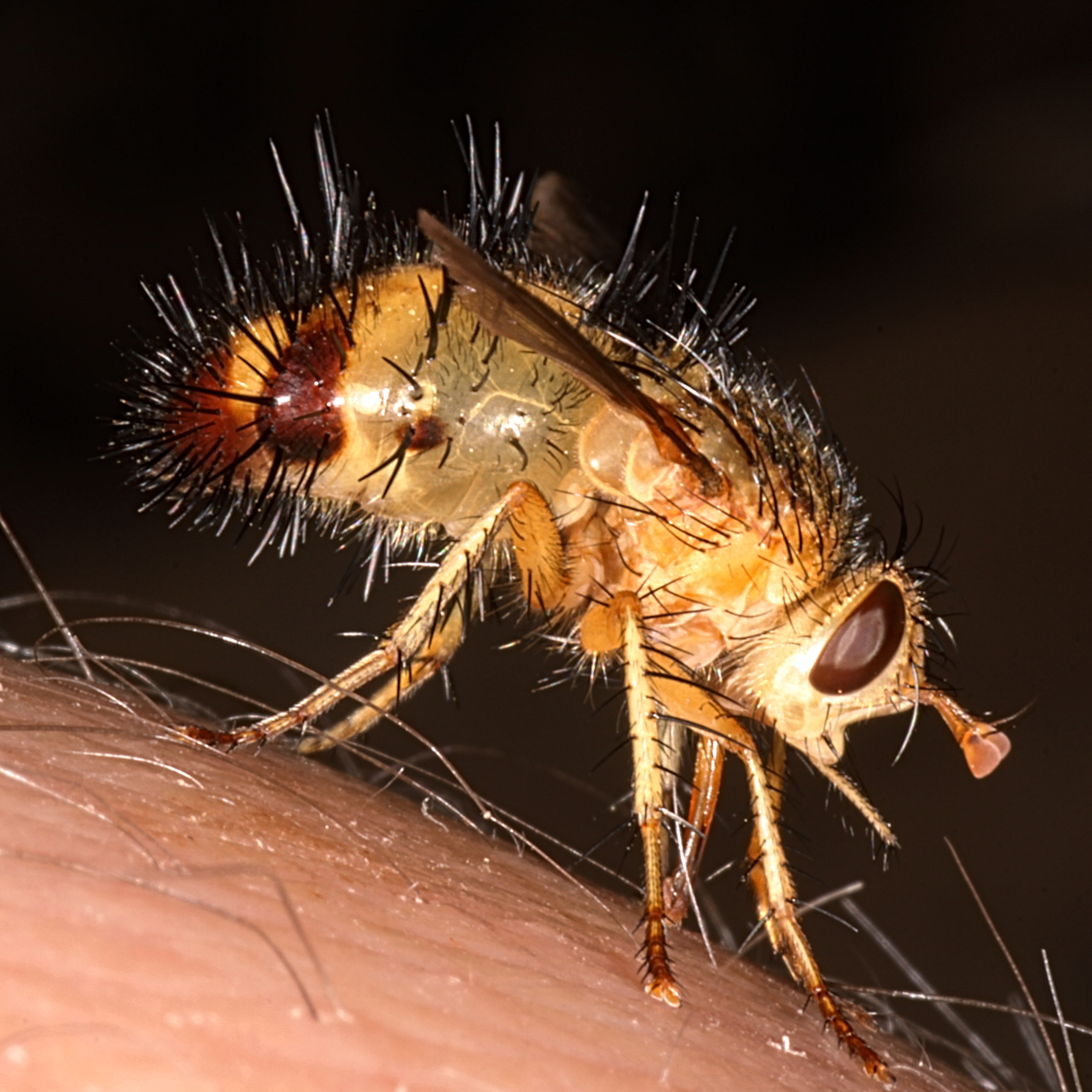
- Dejeania bombylans

Scientific classification
- Kingdom: Animalia
- Phylum: Arthropoda
- Class: Insecta
- Order: Diptera
- Family: Tachinidae
- Subfamily: Tachininae
- Tribe: Tachinini
- Genus: Dejeania; Robineau-Desvoidy, 1830

Type species
- Dejeania capensis Robineau-Desvoidy, 1830

Synonyms
- Dejania Rondani, 1850; Melanojeania Townsend, 1933

= Dejeania =

Genus of flies

Dejeania is a genus of flies in the family Tachinidae.

== Species ==
- Dejeania bombylans (Fabricius, 1798)
- Dejeania canescens Macquart, 1846
- Dejeania hecate Karsch, 1886
- Dejeania longirostris Emden, 1960
- Dejeania pertristis Villeneuve, 1913
