= Androsoma =

Scientific classification
- Kingdom: Animalia
- Phylum: Arthropoda
- Clade: Pancrustacea
- Class: Insecta
- Order: Diptera
- Family: Tachinidae
- Subfamily: Tachininae
- Tribe: Tachinini
- Genus: Androsoma; Cortés & Campos, 1971

Type species
- Androsoma perhirsutum Cortés & Campos, 1971

Genus of flies

Androsoma is a genus of flies in the family Tachinidae.

== Species ==
- Androsoma perhirsutum Cortés & Campos, 1971

== Distribution ==
Chile.
