= Melanepalpus =

Scientific classification
- Kingdom: Animalia
- Phylum: Arthropoda
- Class: Insecta
- Order: Diptera
- Family: Tachinidae
- Subfamily: Tachininae
- Tribe: Tachinini
- Genus: Melanepalpus; Townsend, 1914

Type species
- Melanepalpus albipes Townsend, 1914

Genus of flies

Melanepalpus is a genus of flies in the family Tachinidae.

== Species ==
- Melanepalpus albipes Townsend, 1914
- Melanepalpus fulvus Townsend, 1914
- Melanepalpus meraculus Reinhard, 1975
