= Quadratosoma =

Scientific classification
- Kingdom: Animalia
- Phylum: Arthropoda
- Class: Insecta
- Order: Diptera
- Family: Tachinidae
- Subfamily: Tachininae
- Tribe: Tachinini
- Genus: Quadratosoma; Townsend, 1914

Type species
- Quadratosoma rufum Townsend, 1914

Synonyms
- Quadratosoma Townsend, 1914

Genus of flies

Quadratosoma is a genus of flies in the family Tachinidae.

== Species ==
- Quadratosoma rufum Townsend, 1914

== Distribution ==
Peru.
