= Ruiziella =

Scientific classification
- Kingdom: Animalia
- Phylum: Arthropoda
- Clade: Pancrustacea
- Class: Insecta
- Order: Diptera
- Family: Tachinidae
- Subfamily: Tachininae
- Tribe: Tachinini
- Genus: Ruiziella; Cortés, 1951

Type species
- Ruiziella frontosa Cortés, 1951

Genus of flies

Ruiziella is a genus of flies in the family Tachinidae.

== Species ==
- Ruiziella frontosa Cortés, 1951
- Ruiziella luctuosa Cortés, 1951

== Distribution ==
Argentina, Chile.
