= Oxyepalpus =

Scientific classification
- Kingdom: Animalia
- Phylum: Arthropoda
- Class: Insecta
- Order: Diptera
- Family: Tachinidae
- Subfamily: Tachininae
- Tribe: Tachinini
- Genus: Oxyepalpus; Townsend, 1927

Type species
- Saundersia flavoscutellata Bischof, 1904

Genus of flies

Oxyepalpus is a genus of flies in the family Tachinidae.

== Species ==
- Oxyepalpus flavoscutellatus (Bischof, 1904)

== Distribution ==
Brazil
