= Chaetoepalpus =

Scientific classification
- Kingdom: Animalia
- Phylum: Arthropoda
- Class: Insecta
- Order: Diptera
- Family: Tachinidae
- Subfamily: Tachininae
- Tribe: Tachinini
- Genus: Chaetoepalpus; Vimmer, 1940

Type species
- Chaetoepalpus coquilleti Vimmer, 1940

Synonyms
- Ruiziella Cortés, 1951

Genus of flies

Chaetoepalpus is a genus of flies in the family Tachinidae.

== Species ==
- Chaetoepalpus coquilleti Vimmer & Soukup, 1940
- Chaetoepalpus luctuosa (Cortés, 1951)
