= Ochroepalpus =

Scientific classification
- Kingdom: Animalia
- Phylum: Arthropoda
- Class: Insecta
- Order: Diptera
- Family: Tachinidae
- Subfamily: Tachininae
- Tribe: Tachinini
- Genus: Ochroepalpus; Townsend, 1927

Type species
- Ochroepalpus ochraceus Townsend, 1927

Genus of flies

Ochroepalpus is a genus of flies in the family Tachinidae.

== Species ==
- Ochroepalpus citrinus Blanchard, 1941
- Ochroepalpus ochraceus Townsend, 1927
