= Zonoepalpus =

Scientific classification
- Kingdom: Animalia
- Phylum: Arthropoda
- Class: Insecta
- Order: Diptera
- Family: Tachinidae
- Subfamily: Tachininae
- Tribe: Tachinini
- Genus: Zonoepalpus; Townsend, 1927

Type species
- Zonoepalpus brasiliensis Townsend, 1927

Genus of flies

Zonoepalpus is a genus of flies in the family Tachinidae.

== Species ==
- Zonoepalpus argentinensis Blanchard, 1941 (Argentina)
- Zonoepalpus testaceus (Robineau-Desvoidy, 1830) (Brazil)
