= Oharamyia =

Scientific classification
- Kingdom: Animalia
- Phylum: Arthropoda
- Class: Insecta
- Order: Diptera
- Family: Tachinidae
- Subfamily: Tachininae
- Tribe: Tachinini
- Genus: Oharamyia; Evenhuis, Pont & Whitmore, 2015

Type species
- Hystricia plagiata Schiner, 1868

Synonyms
- Lindigia Townsend, 1931

Genus of flies

Oharamyia is a genus of flies in the family Tachinidae.

== Species ==
- Oharamyia browni (Curran, 1947)
- Oharamyia oriunda (Reinhard, 1975)
- Oharamyia plagiata (Schiner, 1868)
- Oharamyia varicolor (Curran, 1947)
- Oharamyia vierecki (Curran, 1947)
