= Sergey Paramonov (entomologist) =

Ukrainian-Australian entomologist

Sergey Jacques Paramonov
- Ukrainian: Сергій Якович Парамонов; Russian: Сергей Яковлевич Парамонов
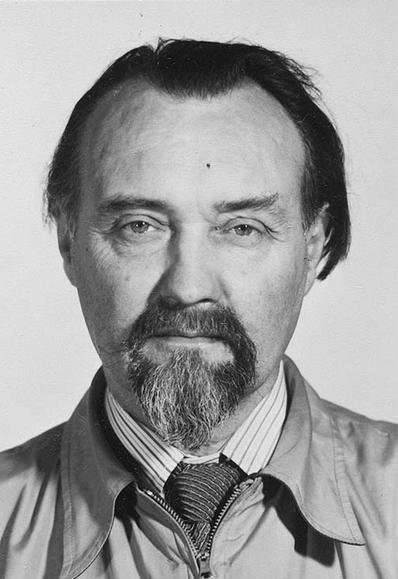
- Born: November 4, 1894; Kharkiv, Russian Empire
- Died: September 22, 1967 (aged 72); Canberra, Australia
- Resting place: Woden Cemetery
- Other name: Sergey Lesnoy
- Citizenship: Russian Empire, Ukrainian People's Republic, Soviet Union, Australia
- Education: Doctor of Sciences in Biology
- Alma mater: Kiev University
- Known for: Dipterology works
- Scientific career
- Fields: Entomology
- Institutions: Institute of Zoology of National Academy of Sciences of Ukraine, Commonwealth Scientific and Industrial Research Organisation
- Thesis: Palearctic Bombyliidae (1940)

Sergey Jacques Paramonov (Russian: Серге́й Я́ковлевич Парамо́нов; 4 November 1894, Kharkiv – 22 September 1967, Canberra) was a Soviet and Australian entomologist, specializing on flies (Diptera), of which described about 700 species and subspecies. Paramonov published over 185 scientific articles, some of which were published posthumously.

== Spellings of the name and pseudonym ==
In his first article, that was written in the Russian Empire in the Pre-reform Russian orthography, his name was given as С. Я. Парамоновъ and translated into English as S. I. Paramonov. In articles written in Ukrainian language he signed as С. Парамонов or С. Я. Парамонов, the same as in Russian language, in German language he used spelling of his name S. J. Paramonow.

When he arrived in Australia, his full name was filled as Paramonov, Sergey Jacques in his form for application of registration. His scientific articles written in Australia were signed as S. J. Paramonov. Although in private life he often used Ukrainian transliteration of his full name Сергій Якович Парамонів - Serhiy Yakowich Paramoniv, and the inscription on his gravestone is written in this way.

Sergey Paramonov signed his works in Russian about the ancient history of the East Slavs and literature writings with the pseudonym Сергей Лесной - Sergey Lesnoy.

== Biography ==
=== Early life ===
Sergey Jacques Paramonov was born on 4 November 1894 in Kharkiv, which was part of the Russian Empire at that time. Both his parents came from the village Yasky near Odessa. His father's full name was Yakiv Yukhymovych Paramonov. Sergey Paramonov's paternal grandparents were peasants. Sergey's mother's full maiden name was Olha Ivanivna Buravchuk. Her father Ivan Maksymovych Buravchuk was a well-educated and respectful person, he worked as an agronomist. Olha's mother was descended of serfs.

Sergey's father Yakiv studied at Kherson Agricultural Institute, where he obtained the forester qualification. During his studying Yakiv Paramonov got under influence of the Narodniks movement, as the result he was taking part in student unrest and was arrested in 1893, together with the future Bolshevik functionary Alexander Tsiurupa. At the beginning of 1894 Yakiv Paramonov married Olha Buravchuk and soon their first son Sergey was born in Kharkiv.

In his known letter to the mother Sergey Paramonov mentioned Raikivtsi, where she had nursed him as a toddler. It is probably the village Raikivtsi in Podolia, but this village is not mentioned in any known S. Paramonov's official documents.

In 1902 the Paramonov family moved into Polotsk, where their second son Oleksiy was born in March 1903. From 1904 to 1908 Yakiv Paramonov worked as a forester in the Nizhny Novgorod Governorate. At that time Sergey was studying at Veliky Ustyug Gymnasium, which was more than 50 kilometres from their home through difficult forest roads.

In 1908 the family moved closer to their home village Yasky. Yakov Paramonov got a job as a forester on the opposite bank of the Dniester river in Cioburciu village, now in Moldova, of the Bessarabia Governorate. Therefore, Sergey Paramonov continued his education in the uyezd centre at Akkerman Gymnasium, now Bilhorod-Dnistrovskyi, Ukraine.

=== Kiev period ===
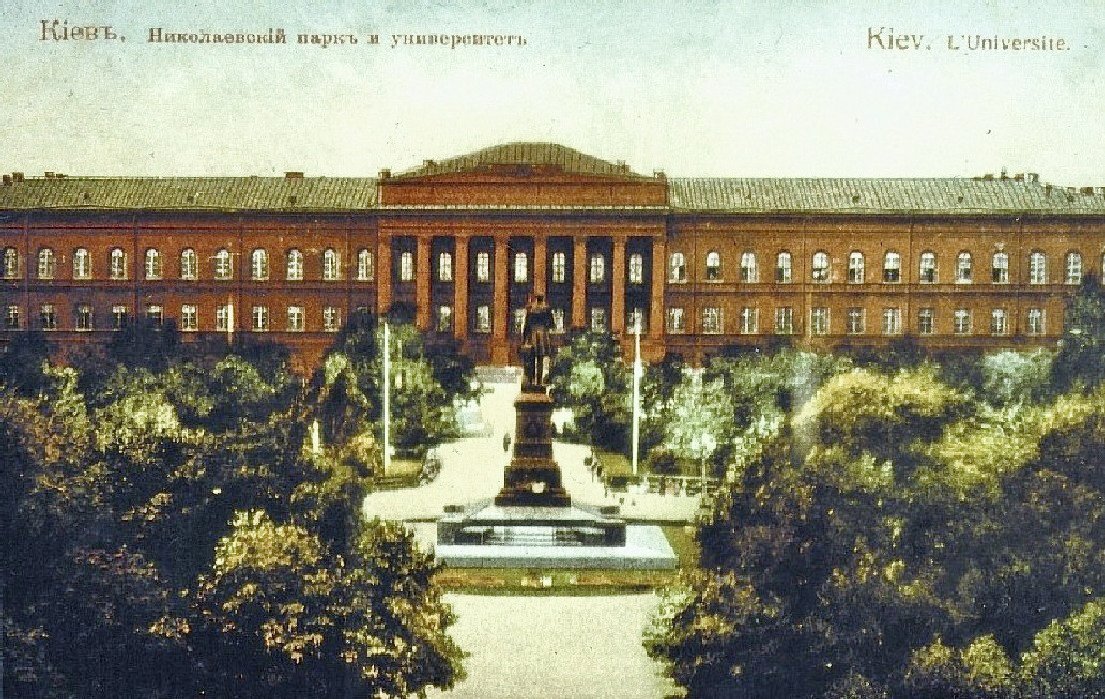
Kiev University at the time of Paramonov's study

In 1912 Sergey Paramonov graduated from Akkerman Gymnasium and entered Kiev University. He choose Zoology as a main subject, his favourite branch was Ornithology at that time.

Despite the fact that in all known official documents Paramonov was mentioned as an ethnic Russian, he took part in the Ukrainian National Revival movement. In 1914 and 1915 Ukrainian organizations were trying to conduct the celebration of Taras Shevchenko's 100 years anniversary, as a result the police arrested some activists. During these events Sergey was detained twice for a month each time. To avoid more serious punishment Paramonov was helped by the privatdozent Viktor Kazanovsky's protection.

In 1915 Sergey Paramonov published his first scientific note "On the record of the spotted cuckoo in Bessarabian Government" in the Ornithological Journal. He found, a very rare bird in the Russian Empire, the spotted cuckoo by himself while he was having a holiday at his parents' in Cioburciu.

In spite of World War I and the collapse of the Russian Empire, Sergey managed to successfully graduate from Kiev University in 1917 and to get a job at the Kiev's station of plant pest control, where Viktor Kazanovsky worked as a director. It was the first time when Sergey faced practical dipterology. In particular he worked on a problem how to use parasitic flies as a natural limit of a number of pest insects.

In September 1918 the Kiev's station of plant pest control was moved to the village of Starosillia near Chernobyl because of the Ukrainian–Soviet War. On 14 November 1918 the Ukrainian Academy of Sciences was established by order of the Hetman of Ukraine Pavlo Skoropadskyi. On 1 May 1919 the academy opened the Ukrainian Zoological Museum. The biologist Mykola Kashchenko was a museum director and the collection manager was the entomologist Volodymyr Karavaiev.

After the Red Army captured Kiev in November 1919, the teacher of Sergey, Mr Kazanovsky, died in mysterious way, so Sergey Paramonov started supporting his widow and children. After a while in 1920 he married Kazanovsky's widow Svitlana, who was 13 years older than him. It might have been just a Christian marriage because Soviet authorities did not recognise it. Sergey Paramonov was mentioned as a single person in all Soviet documents.

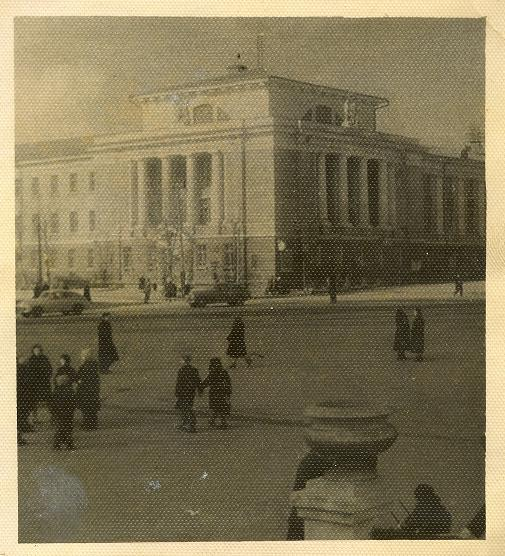
The Ukrainian Academy of Sciences building in 1930 where the Zoological Museum was located.

In 1920 Paramonov started working at the Zoolofical Museum of the Ukrainian Academy of Sciences. He donated to the museum his own collection of more than 12 thousand copies of the diptera and 64 skins of birds. In 1923–25 he had the scientific expeditions to the Crimea and Transcaucasia under the aegis of the Ukrainian Academy of Sciences. In 1924 Vienna entomological journal "Konowia" published three of Paramonov's articles about new species of the Syrphidae and Bombyliidae families, followed by other publications about the Diptera order in domestic and foreign scientific journals. In 1926 he set off the expeditions to Central Asia and in 1927 to Armenia. The result of these expeditions and the further scientific research and systematics became his four large monographs. In 1928 Paramonov went for research work to the Museum für Naturkunde in Berlin. He met with his colleagues, entomologists Günther Enderlein and Erich Martin Hering, there.

In 1930 the Institute of Zoology of the Ukrainian Academy of Sciences was established and the evolutionist Ivan Schmalhausen became its first director. Paramonov started working as an editor-in-chief of the Institute journal. In 1935 he conducted a research in Pryazovia (Sea of Azov coast). In 1938 during the Political repression in the Soviet Union Sergey's father Yakiv was arrested and executed.

In 1940 Sergey Parmonov wrote and defended the thesis "Palearctic Bombyliidae", thus he earned the Doctor of Sciences in Biology, soon he was appointed as a director of the Zoological Museum.

On 19 September 1941 Nazi Germany captured Kiev. According to memoirs of his colleague the zoologist Yevdokia Reshetnyk, Paramonov saved several building including the Ukrainian opera house, the Academy of Science, and others by pointing Germans to places where Bolsheviks had laid explosives to blow the opera house up.

Paramonov was going on working at the Zoological Museum though he stopped holding the director post. Germans appointed the zoologist Mykola Sharleman as a director because he was a volksdeutsche. At the time of Nazi occupation the Austrian entomologist Karl E. Schedl was working at the Ukrainian Zoological Museum too. Germans decided to evacuate the museum because of the Soviet advance, so Nazis declared museum exhibits as war trophies and sent them to Poznań.

=== Emigration ===
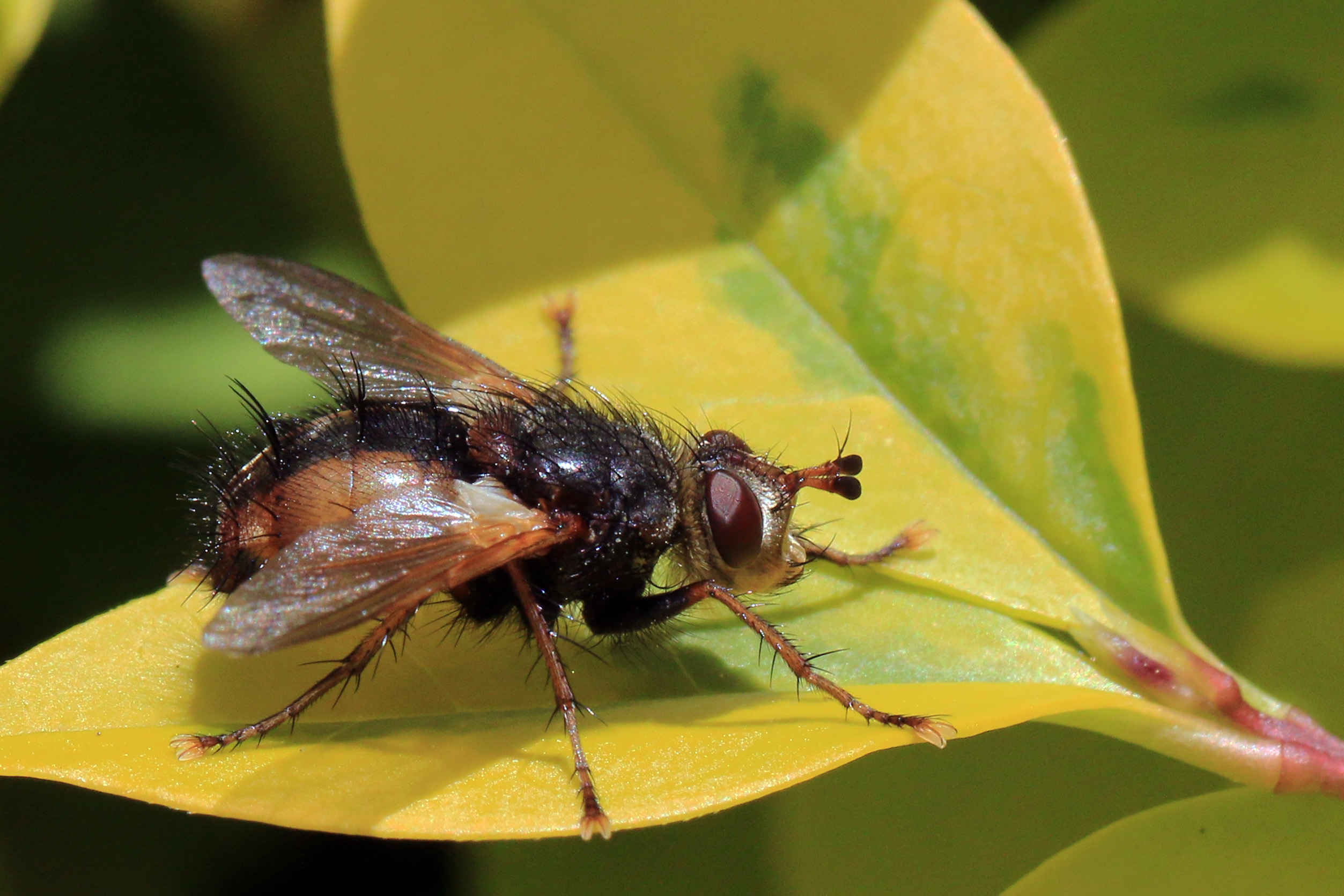
One of the Paramonov's objects of study - the family Tachinidae

In September 1943 Sergey Paramonov had to accompany exhibits of the Ukrainian Zoological Museum to Poznań and then in 1945 to Berlin, some of them still have been keeping in the Museum für Naturkunde. In April 1945 Nazis arrested him and wanted to shoot him. Paramonov managed to save his life by protection of a "familiar professor", who might have been Erich Martin Hering. Escaping, Sergey Paramonov fled to Hanover, and from there to Bachenberg. Some sources say that he was put into the Nazi concentration camp near Munden, However, the German Red Cross has not proved it. When the allied forces captured this part of Germany, Paramonov went to Paris.

In June 1945 he arrived in Paris. Here Paramonov was in a difficult position because he did not have a livelihood. He wrote letters to his friends-scientists for help to find an appropriate position corresponding to his knowledge and qualifications. Theodosius Dobzhansky offered him a place at his laboratory in the United States to study drosophilid taxonomy. Another Sergey's friend the entomologist Boris Uvarov asked the chief of CSIRO Alexander John Nicholson about vacancies in Australia. In fact, after André Léon Tonnoir's death in 1940, CSIRO was looking for an experienced entomologist-taxonomist, so in October 1946 Paramonov was offered to apply for a job at CSIRO. While there were being bureaucratic formalities, he left for London to study Australian diptera at the British Museum.

In March 1947, Sergey Paramonov came to Australia. On arrival, he faced a number of problems. The issue of his appointment at CSIRO was raised by MP Joe Abbott in the Parliament of Australia as he guessed that Paramonov might have been a Soviet spy. After thorough consideration, it was decided to keep the position at CSIRO for Paramonov, but to restrict him the access to certain areas in Australia for national security reasons. Another challenge was English language. Paramonov was not very good at English at first so he continued writing his scientific articles mainly in German in the first few years, thus there were some difficulties to publish them in Australia.

Since his English got better, Paramonov published his first article in Australia about the Mydidae, followed by monographs about: the Streblidae, Microtropesa (1951), Nemestrinidae, Apioceridae (1953), Cyrtidae, Scenopinidae, Tapeigaster (Neottiophilidae) (1955), Hirmoneura (Nemestrinidae), Cylindromyia, Saralba (Tachinidae) (1956), Acroceridae (1957), Pyrgotidae (1958) and Leptidea (1962). His last lifetime article was а review of the Lygira (Bombyliidae) species in 1967. After his death, an article about the family Tachinidae was published in 1968. He also wrote small articles for the "Notes on Australian Diptera".

Sergey Paramonov took an active part in the Ukrainian community life. He was a parishioner of the Ukrainian Autocephalous Orthodox Church. He wrote articles for Ukrainian emigrant magazines, mostly about science and religion, which he signed as Serhiy Paramoniv.

== Writings as Sergey Lesnoy ==
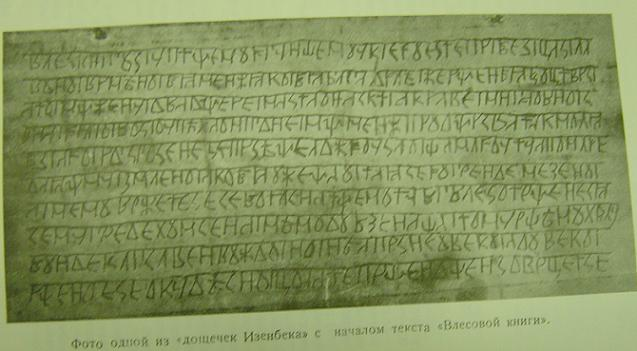
The photo of Izenbek's plank in Lesnoy's book - The History of the Russians in an Unperverted Form

Being in Paris in 1945, Sergey Paramonov met the editor of the Russian emigrant magazine Vozrozhdeniye S. Plautin. They were discussing the article of Paramonov's Kiev colleague the zoologist Mykola Sharleman "The Tale of Igor's Campaign in terms of Natural science", which was published in Ukrainian language in 1940. As a result of the conversation, Paramonov was offered to write a small article for the Vozrozhdeniye with an analysis of Sharleman's work. Thus he wrote the article "The Tale of Igor's Campaign from the point of view of a naturalist" and signed it as Sergey Lesnoy for some reasons.

The pseudonym Lesnoy may come from his father's job - the forester. The Russian word les (Russian: лес) means a forest.

After writing his first article, the ancient history of the East Slavs became his topic of interest, so while he was living in Australia Paramonov wrote series of compositions about it. The compositions that were written in Russian he signed as Sergey Lesnoy. Besides that he tried himself in literature. His most significant works in Russian were:

- The Tale of Igor's Campaign. Study in four volumes. To the 150th anniversary of the publication. (Слово о Полку Игореве. Исследование в четырёх томах. К 150-летию со дня опубликования), Paris, 1950–53.
- Devilry under the Lysa Hora. (Чертовщина под Лысой горой), Paris, 1952.
- The history of Rus' people in a not perverted form. (История «руссов» в неизвращенном виде), Paris, Munich, 1953–60.
- Revision of the basics of the Slavs history. (Пересмотр основ истории славян), Melbourne, 1956
- Who created ancient Rus': The Slavs or Germanic peoples? (Кто создал древнюю Русь: Славяне или германцы?) Paris, Vozrozhdeniye #108, 1960.
- Rus', where are you from? (Русь, откуда ты?) Winnipeg, 1962. Rostov-on-Don, 1995.
- The book of Wles, (Влесова Книга), Winnipeg, 1966. Moscow, 2002.
- From the distant past of the Slavs. (Из далекого прошлого славян), Melbourne, 1967

== The Book of Veles ==
In 1954 Sergey Paramonov received the white émigré magazine Zhar-ptitsa (Firebird), which was published in San Francisco, from Aleksandr Kurenkov. The magazine contained a letter from their Brussels' reader Yury Mirolubov, where he reported about strange artifacts – carved planks, which had been found by Fedor Izenbek near Kharkiv, when he had been serving as a colonel of the Volunteer Army. According to Mirolubov after the White movement defeat, Izenbek took the planks in emigration and they were lost in Belgium during the Second World War. Mirolubov claimed that he had managed to copy down some texts of them.

Paramonov was very impressed that information and took from Kurenkov and Mirolubov all available materials about Izenbek's planks. Among other Paramonov gained a photograph of plank 16, there was the only one plank, the quality photo of which had been made. The text of that plank begins with the words: "Влес книгу сію" (Vles the book this). So Paramonov decided to call the whole text of the Izenbek's planks as "Влесова Книга" or "The Book of Wles" in English.

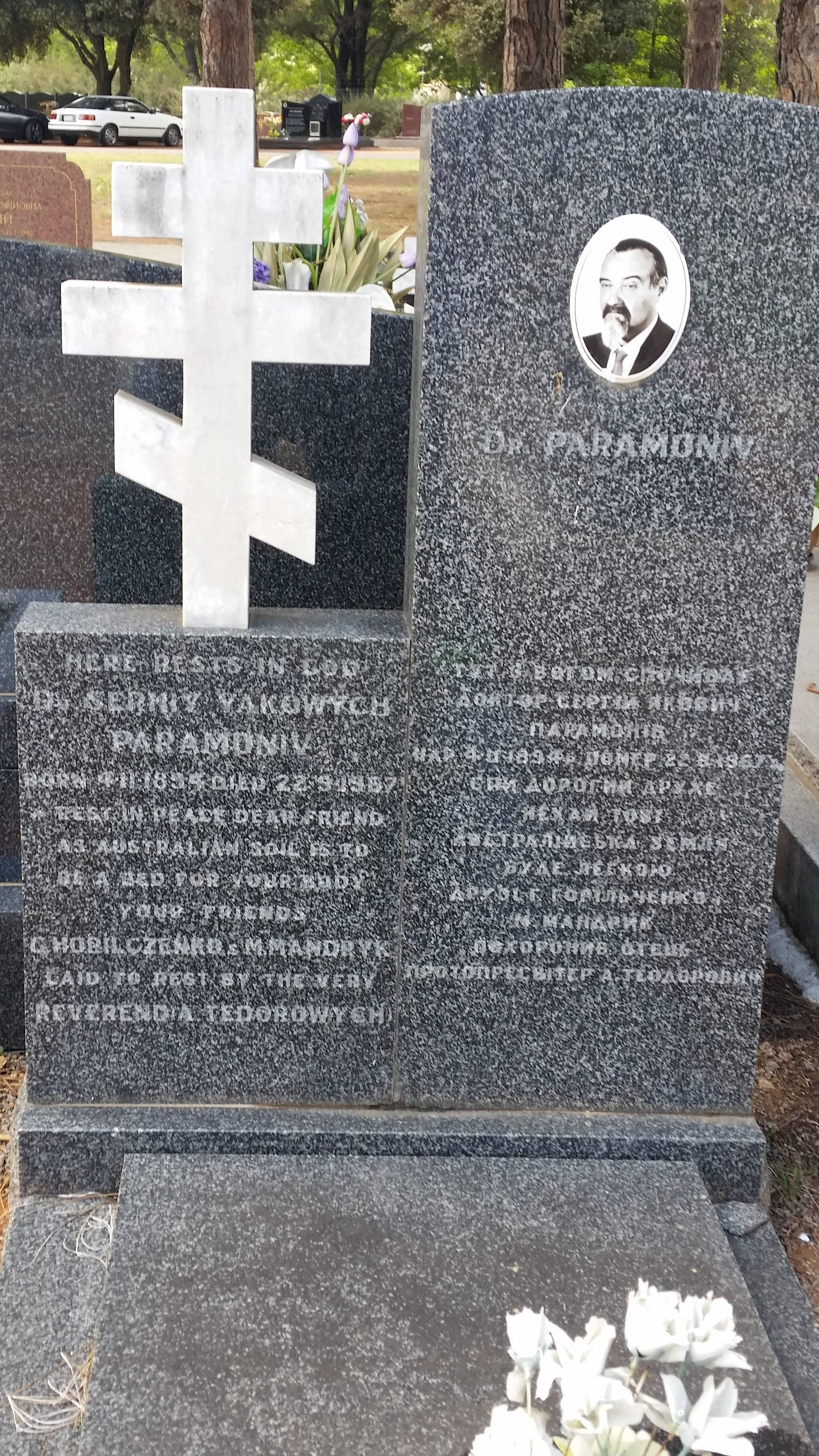
The tomb of the scientist in the Woden Cemetery

Initially Sergey Paramonov believed in the Book of Veles authenticity and reckoned that it had been written in the Proto-Slavic language. He started studying and analyzing the text and wrote articles about it for Ukrainian and Russian emigrant magazines. In fact S. Paramonov made the information about the Book of Veles to be available for the general public. Eventually it resulted that the Book of Veles has become like the Bible for many Slavic neopaganism movements.

Paramonov needed to prove the Book of Veles authenticity so he sent all his researches and all materials, he had, to the Academy of Sciences of the USSR under the mediation of the University of Melbourne. The Soviet scientists verdict was: "The Book of Veles is a literary forgery".

== Death ==
During the last ten years of his life Sergey Paramonov severely suffered from arthritis, angina and chronic nephritis . After the visit him by the slavist Boris Unbegaun in September 1967, who strongly criticised Paramonov's investigations into the Book of Veles, his health deteriorated significantly. On 18 September 1967 Sergey's younger brother Oleksiy died in Bordon, England. On 19 September Sergey Paramonov was taken to a Canberra hospital where he died on 22 September 1967, in the age of 72.

Sergey Paramonov was buried in the Woden Cemetery. There are two inscriptions in English and Ukrainian on his gravestone:

Dr. PARAMONIV Here rests in God Dr Serhiy Yakowych Paramoniv. Born 4.11.1894 died 22.9.1967. Rest in peace dear friend as Australian soil is to be a bed for your body. Your friends G. Horilchenko & S. Mandryk. Laid to rest by the very reverend A. Tedorowych

Before his death Sergey Paramonov made a will according to which he left all his savings for the St. Nicholas Ukrainian Autocephalous Orthodox Church construction in Canberra.

After some time the St Nicholas church became a core of the Ukrainian Orthodox Centre, where the Memorial to victims of the 1932-1933 enforced famine-genocide in Ukraine was erected in 1985.
