= Edwynia =

Scientific classification
- Kingdom: Animalia
- Phylum: Arthropoda
- Class: Insecta
- Order: Diptera
- Family: Tachinidae
- Subfamily: Tachininae
- Tribe: Tachinini
- Genus: Edwynia; Aldrich, 1930

Type species
- Reedia robusta Aldrich, 1928

Synonyms
- Reedia Aldrich, 1928

Genus of flies

Edwynia is a genus of flies in the family Tachinidae.

== Species ==
- Edwynia robusta (Aldrich, 1928)

== Distribution ==
Chile, Argentina
