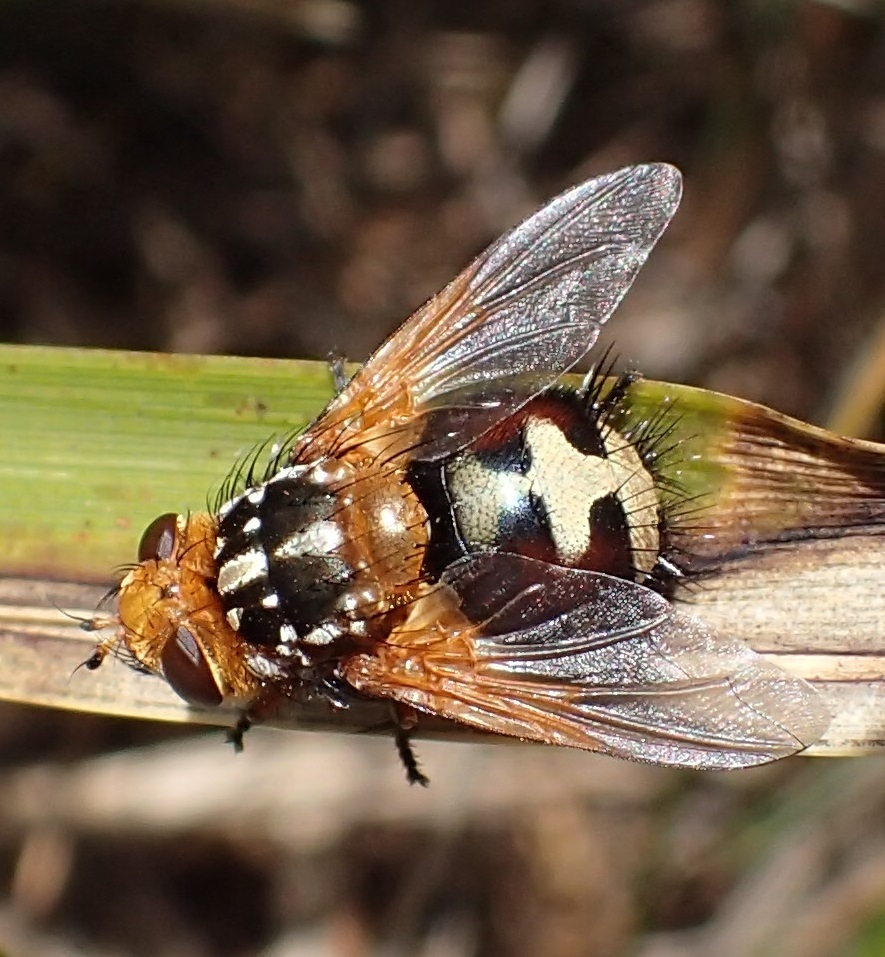
- Microtropesa nigricornis

Scientific classification
- Kingdom: Animalia
- Phylum: Arthropoda
- Class: Insecta
- Order: Diptera
- Family: Tachinidae
- Subfamily: Tachininae
- Tribe: Tachinini
- Genus: Microtropesa; Macquart, 1846

Type species
- Musca sinuata Donovan, 1805

Synonyms
- Gerotachina Townsend, 1916; Microtropeza Macquart, 1851

= Microtropesa =

Genus of flies

Microtropesa is a genus of flies in the family Tachinidae.

== Species ==
- Microtropesa danielsi Burwell, 1996
- Microtropesa flavitarsis Malloch, 1929
- Microtropesa flaviventris Malloch, 1930
- Microtropesa intermedia Malloch, 1930
- Microtropesa longimentum Burwell, 1996
- Microtropesa nigricornis Macquart, 1851
- Microtropesa obtusa (Walker, 1853)
- Microtropesa ochriventris Malloch, 1929
- Microtropesa sinuata (Donovan, 1805)
- Microtropesa skusei Bergroth, 1894
- Microtropesa violacescens Enderlein, 1937
