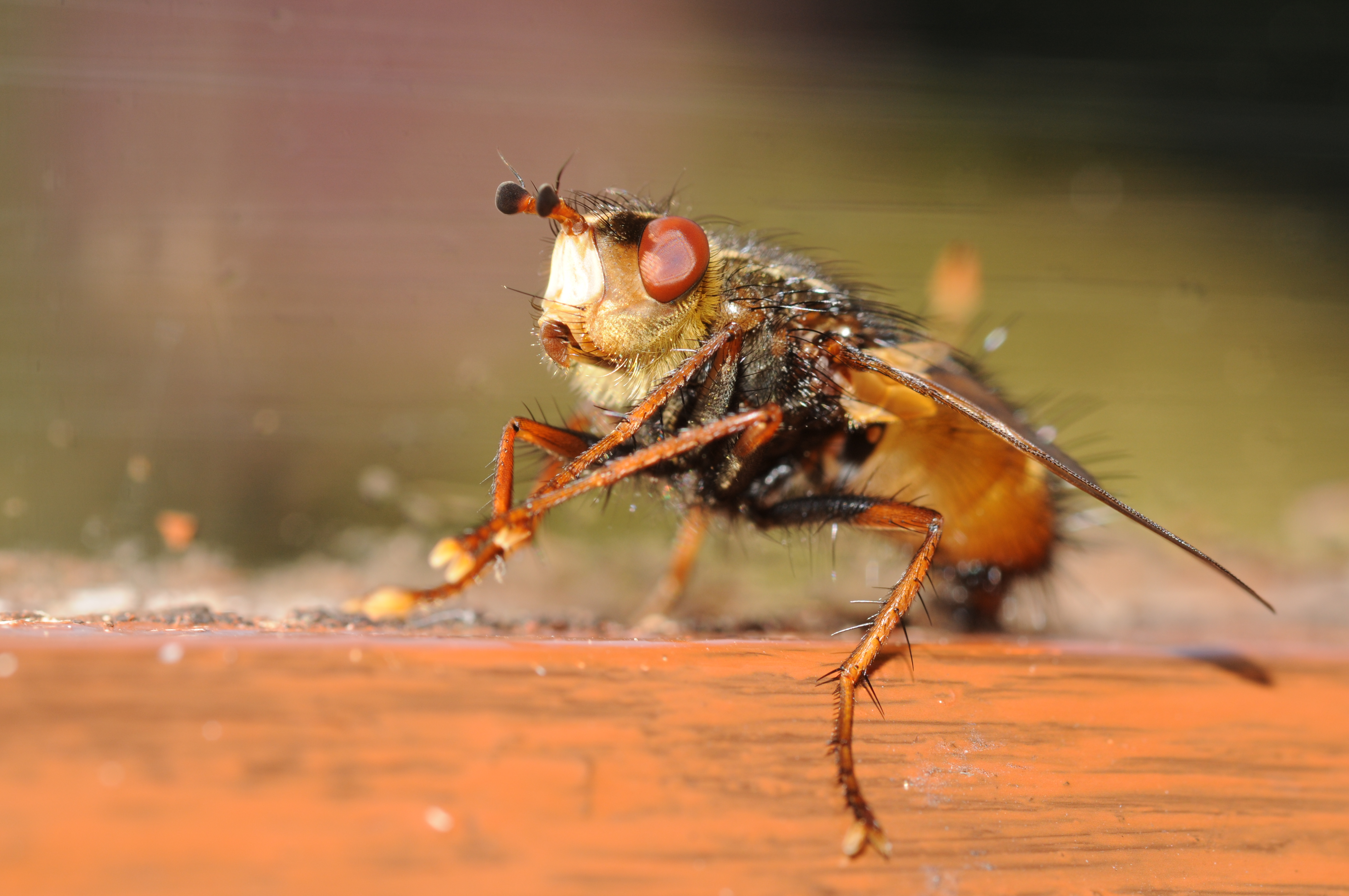
- Tachina fera

Scientific classification
- Kingdom: Animalia
- Phylum: Arthropoda
- Clade: Pancrustacea
- Class: Insecta
- Order: Diptera
- Family: Tachinidae
- Subfamily: Tachininae
- Tribe: Tachinini

= Tachinini =

Tribe of flies

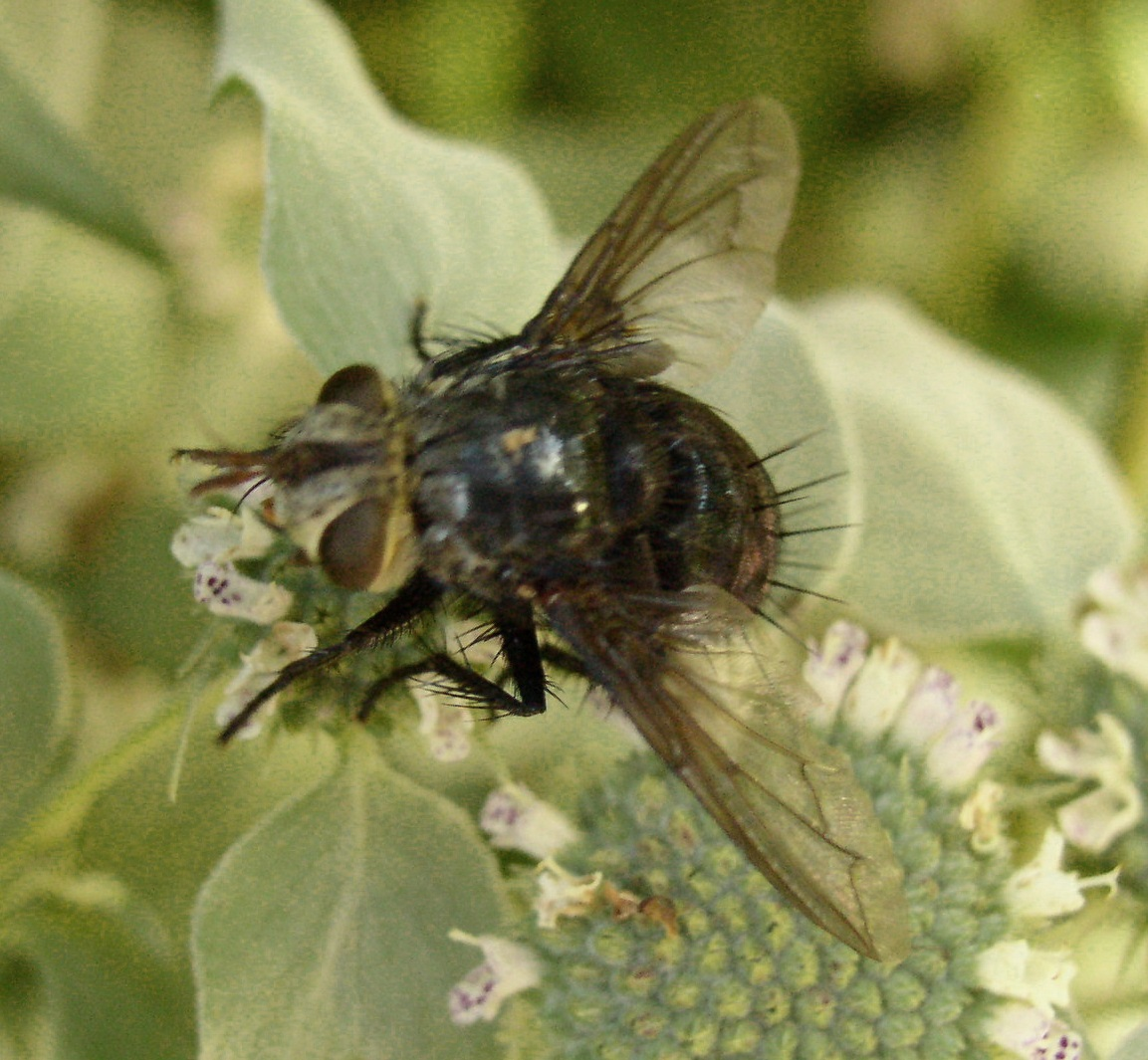
Archytas metallicus

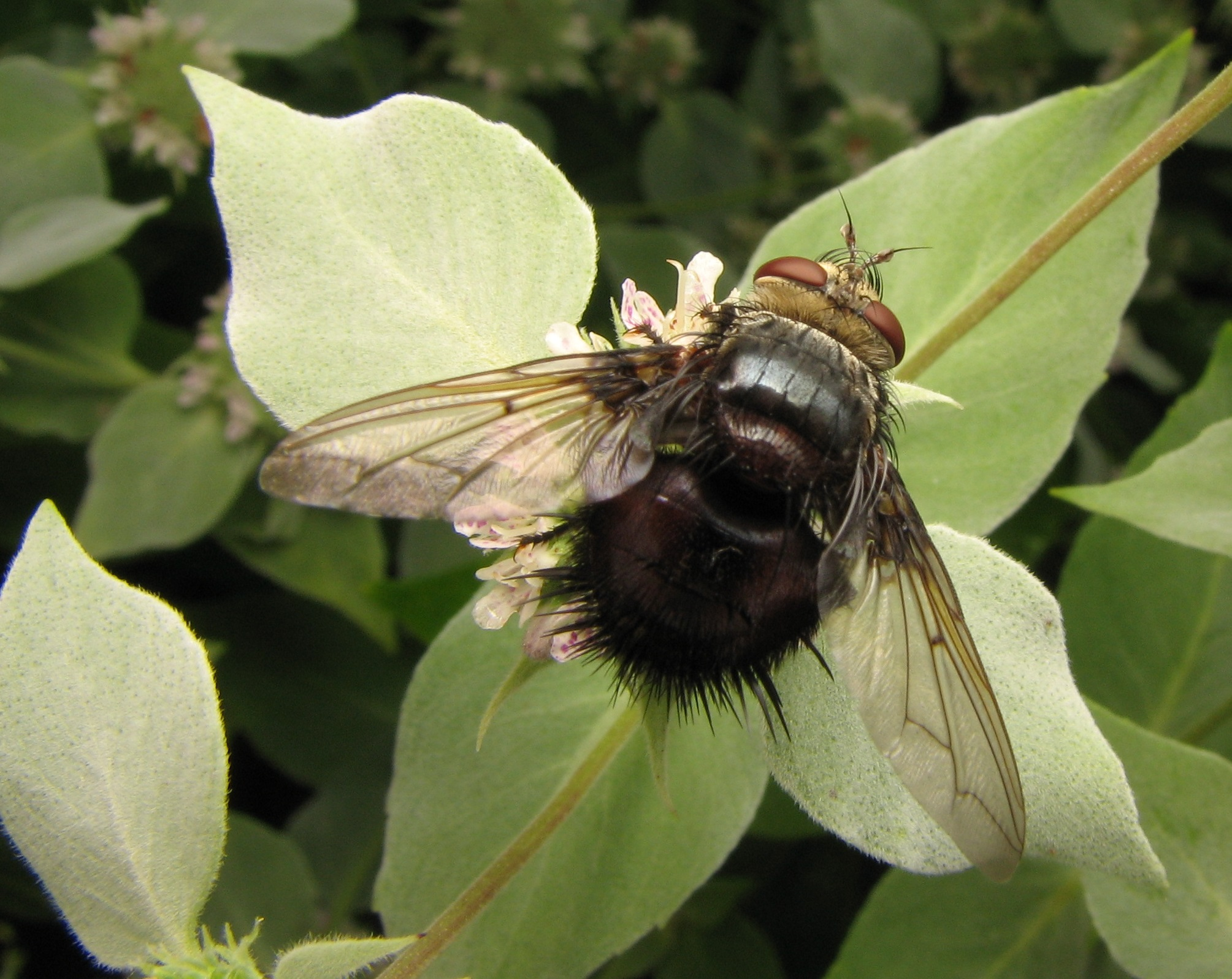
Juriniopsis sp.

Tachinini is a tribe of flies in the family Tachinidae.

== Genera ==
- Abepalpus Townsend, 1931
- Acroceronia Cortés, 1951
- Acuphoceropsis Blanchard, 1943
- Adejeania Townsend, 1913
- Agicuphocera Townsend, 1915
- Allelomyia Gonzalez, 1992
- Androsoma Cortés & Campos, 1971
- Archytas Jaennicke, 1867
- Archytoepalpus Townsend, 1927
- Austeniops Townsend, 1915
- Beskiocephala Townsend, 1916
- Bischofimyia Townsend, 1927
- Camposiana Townsend, 1915
- Catajurinia Townsend, 1927
- Chaetoepalpus Vimmer, 1940
- Chrysomikia Mesnil, 1970
- Cnephaotachina Brauer & von Bergenstamm, 1894
- Comopsis Cortés, 1986
- Copecrypta Townsend, 1908
- Corpulentoepalpus Townsend, 1927
- Corpulentosoma Townsend, 1914
- Cryptopalpus Rondani, 1850
- Cyanogymnomma Townsend, 1927
- Cyanopsis Townsend, 1917
- Dejeania Robineau-Desvoidy, 1830
- Dejeaniops Townsend, 1913
- Deopalpus Townsend, 1908
- Diaphanomyia Townsend, 1917
- Dumerillia Robineau-Desvoidy, 1830
- Echinopyrrhosia Townsend, 1914
- Echinopyrrhosiops Townsend, 1931
- Edwynia Aldrich, 1930
- Empheremyia Bischof, 1904
- Empheremyiops Townsend, 1927
- Epalpellus Townsend, 1914
- Epalpodes Townsend, 1912
- Epalpus Rondani, 1850
- Epicuphocera Townsend, 1927
- Eristaliomyia Townsend, 1926
- Erythroepalpus Townsend, 1931
- Eubischofimyia Townsend, 1927
- Eudejeania Townsend, 1912
- Euempheremyia Townsend, 1927
- Euepalpodes Townsend, 1915
- Eufabriciopsis Townsend, 1915
- Euhuascaraya Townsend, 1927
- Eujuriniodes Townsend, 1935
- Eulasiopalpus Townsend, 1913
- Eumelanepalpus Townsend, 1915
- Eusaundersiops Townsend, 1915
- Eutrichophora Townsend, 1915
- Exopalpus Macquart, 1851
- Fabriciopsis Townsend, 1914
- Formicomyia Townsend, 1916
- Gigantoepalpus Townsend, 1931
- Gymnomma Wulp, 1888
- Gymnommopsis Townsend, 1927
- Hegesinus Reinhard, 1964
- Helioprosopa Townsend, 1927
- Homosaundersia Townsend, 1931
- Homosaundersiops Townsend, 1931
- Huascarayopsis Townsend, 1927
- Itacuphocera Townsend, 1927
- Itasaundersia Townsend, 1927
- Jurinella Brauer & von Bergenstamm, 1889
- Jurinia Robineau-Desvoidy, 1830
- Juriniopsis Townsend, 1916
- Juriniosoma Townsend, 1927
- Laufferiella Villeneuve, 1929
- Lindigepalpus Townsend, 1931
- Macrojurinia Townsend, 1916
- Melanepalpellus Townsend, 1927
- Melanepalpus Townsend, 1914
- Mesnilisca Zimin, 1974
- Microgymnomma Townsend, 1916
- Microtropesa Macquart, 1846
- Mikia Kowarz, 1885
- Neocuphocera Townsend, 1927
- Neogymnomma Townsend, 1915
- Neosarromyia Townsend, 1927
- Ochroepalpus Townsend, 1927
- Oestrohystricia Townsend, 1912
- Oharamyia Evenhuis, Pont & Whitmore, 2015
- Opsoempheria Townsend, 1927
- Oxyepalpus Townsend, 1927
- Palpolinnaemyia Townsend, 1927
- Palpotachina Townsend, 1915
- Paradejeania Brauer & von Bergenstamm, 1893
- Pararchytas Brauer & von Bergenstamm, 1895
- Paratachina Brauer & von Bergenstamm, 1891
- Paratropeza Paramonov, 1964
- Parechinotachina Townsend, 1931
- Parepalpus Coquillett, 1902
- Peleteria Robineau-Desvoidy, 1830
- Periopticochaeta Townsend, 1927
- Phosocephala Townsend, 1908
- Pictoepalpus Townsend, 1915
- Platyschineria Villeneuve, 1942
- Prospanipalpus Townsend, 1931
- Protodejeania Townsend, 1915
- Pseudoepalpodes Vimmer and Soukup, 1940
- Pseudoxanthozona Townsend, 1931
- Pseudoxanthozonella Townsend, 1931
- Pyrrhotachina Townsend, 1931
- Quadratosoma Townsend, 1914
- Rhachoepalpus Townsend, 1908
- Rhachosaundersia Townsend, 1931
- Ruiziella Cortés, 1951
- Sarromyia Pokorny, 1893
- Saundersiops Townsend, 1914
- Schineria Rondani, 1857
- Sericotachina Townsend, 1916
- Signosoma Townsend, 1914
- Signosomopsis Townsend, 1914
- Steatosoma Aldrich, 1934
- Tachina Meigen, 1803
- Talarocera Williston, 1887
- Tothillia Crosskey, 1976
- Trichoepalpus Townsend, 1914
- Trichophora Macquart, 1847
- Trichosaundersia Townsend, 1914
- Trypherina Malloch, 1938
- Uruhuasia Townsend, 1914
- Uruhuasiopsis Townsend, 1915
- Vertepalpus Curran, 1947
- Vibrissoepalpus Townsend, 1914
- Vibrissomyia Townsend, 1912
- Xanthoepalpodes Townsend, 1931
- Xanthoepalpus Townsend, 1914
- Xanthozona Townsend, 1908
- Zonoepalpus Townsend, 1927
