= A. grandis =

A. grandis may refer to:

- Abacetus grandis, a ground beetle
- Abies grandis, the grand fir, giant fir, lowland white fir, great silver fir, Western white fir, Vancouver fir or Oregon fir, a tree species native to the Pacific Northwest and Northern California of North America
- Acanthastrea grandis, a synonym of Acanthastrea echinata, the starry cup coral
- Acanthodactylus grandis, the giant fringe-fingered lizard, found in western Asia
- Acanthodica grandis, a moth found in Mexico
- Aceraius grandis, a bess beetle
- Achillea grandis, a synonym of Achillea ptarmica, a plant native to Europe and western Asia
- Achlaena grandis, a mantis found in Central Africa
- Acridotheres grandis, the great myna, a bird found in Asia
- Acromantis grandis, a mantis found in Vietnam and Nepal
- Acropora grandis, a stony coral
- Adejeania grandis, a tachinid fly found in South America
- Adelinia grandis, Pacific hound's tongue, a plant native to western North America
- Admete grandis, a synonym of Admete viridula, a sea snail found in circumarctic waters and the northwest Atlantic Ocean
- Aedophron grandis, a synonym of Copablepharon grandis, the pale yellow dune moth, found in North America
- Aenictus grandis, an army ant found in Asia
- Aeshna grandis, the brown hawker, a large dragonfly species widespread in England
- Aglaia grandis, a plant found in Asia
- Aigialus grandis, a fungus
- Aiphanes grandis, a plant found in Ecuador
- Alatina grandis, a box jellyfish found in the Pacific Ocean
- Alcaeorrhynchus grandis, the giant strong-nosed stink bug, found in the Americas
- Alcedo grandis, a synonym of Alcedo hercules, Blyth's kingfisher, a bird found in Asia
- Alliaria grandis, a synonym of Dysoxylum grande, a tree found in Asia
- Allographa grandis, a lichen found in Cameroon
- Alopias grandis, a prehistoric shark
- Alternanthera grandis, a plant species endemic to Ecuador
- Amblypneustes grandis, a sea urchin
- Amphilius grandis, a catfish found in Kenya
- Aname grandis, a spider found in Australia
- Anametalia grandis, a sea urchin
- Anastrepha grandis, the South American cucurbit fruit fly
- Anchinia grandis, a moth found in Europe
- Androphana grandis, a synonym of Strongygaster globula, a tachinid fly found in Europe and Asia
- Angistorhinus grandis, an extinct phytosaur species found in Texas and Wyoming in the United States and that lived from the Late Triassic period
- Angoleumolpus grandis, a synonym of Afroeurydemus bipunctatus, a leaf beetle found in Africa
- Anisophyllea grandis, a tree found in Malaysia
- Antennaria grandis, a synonym of Antennaria howellii, a plant found in North America
- Anthonomus grandis, the boll weevil, an insect found in the Americas
- Aplonis grandis, the brown-winged starling, a bird found in the Solomon Islands
- Araeoscelis grandis, a prehistoric tetrapod
- Archaeopteryx grandis, a synonym of Wellnhoferia grandis, a prehistoric dinosaur
- Archilestes grandis, the great spreadwing, a damselfly found in the Americas
- Arctopsyche grandis, a caddisfly found in North America
- Arctotis grandis, a synonym of Arctotis stoechadifolia, a plant found in South Africa
- Armillifer grandis, a tongue worm found in Africa
- Astelia grandis, a plant species in the genus Astelia native to New Zealand
- Asthenotricha grandis, a moth found in Rwanda
- Aublysodon grandis, a nomen dubium given to a large number of carnivorous dinosaur teeth
- Automolis grandis, a synonym of Echeta grandis, a moth found in Ecuador

== See also ==
- Grandis (disambiguation)
