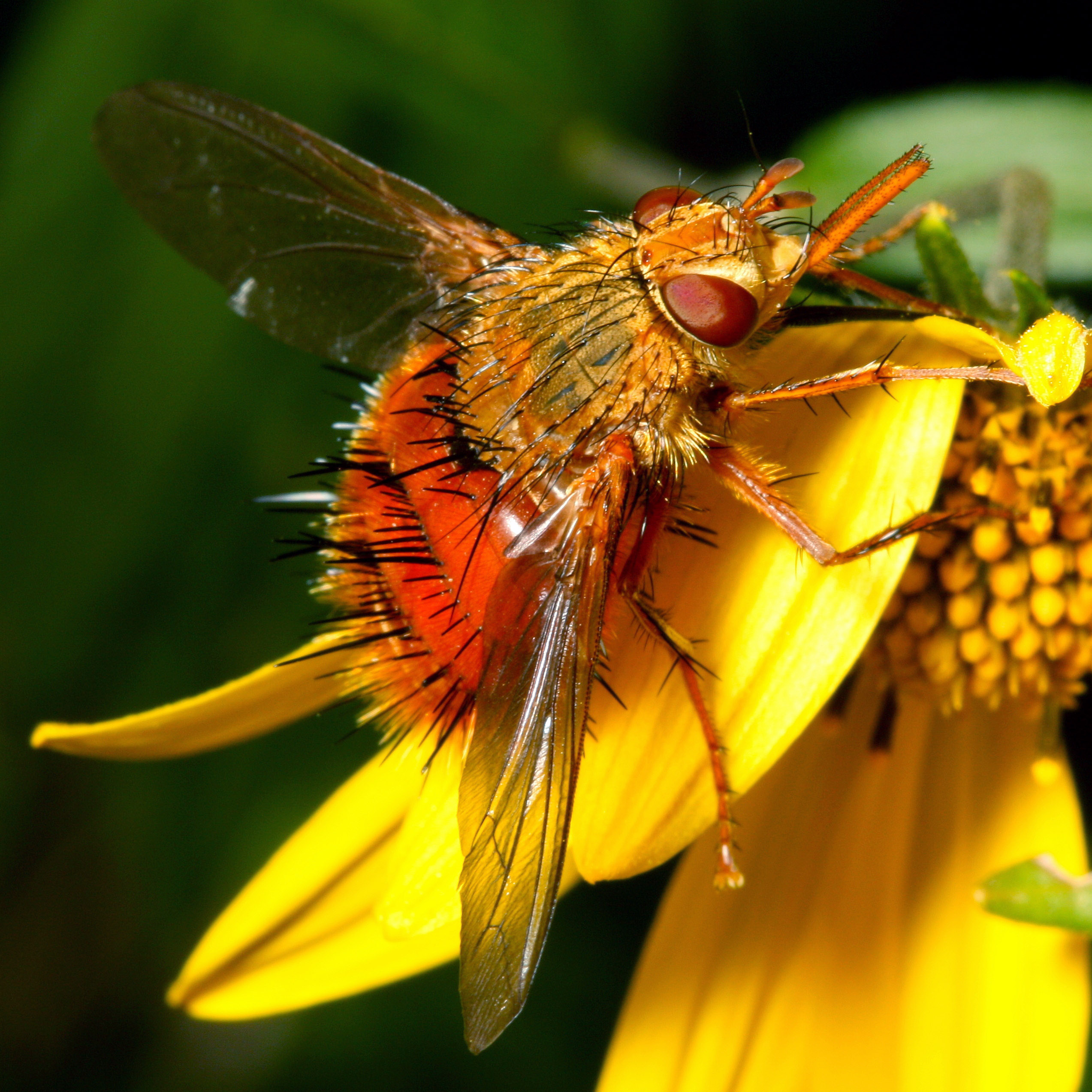
- Adejeania vexatrix

Scientific classification
- Kingdom: Animalia
- Phylum: Arthropoda
- Class: Insecta
- Order: Diptera
- Family: Tachinidae
- Subfamily: Tachininae
- Tribe: Tachinini
- Genus: Adejeania; Townsend, 1913

Type species
- Tachina armata Wiedemann, 1830

Synonyms
- Trichodejeania Townsend, 1913

= Adejeania =

Genus of flies

Adejeania is a genus of tachinid flies from the Americas. While most species are found in South America, A. vexatrix occurs from Mexico up to British Columbia. The genus name is an alteration of Dejeania, meaning "not Dejeania". Other tachinid genera from the same root are Eudejeania, Paradejeania and Protodejeania.

== Species ==
- Adejeania analis (Macquart, 1844) (Colombia)
- Adejeania andina (Townsend, 1912) (Peru)
- Adejeania anduzei Curran, 1947 (Venezuela)
- Adejeania armata (Wiedemann, 1830) (Cuba)
- Adejeania aurea (Giglio-Tos, 1893) (Mexico)
- Adejeania bicaudata Curran, 1947 (Brazil)
- Adejeania biornata Curran, 1947 (Brazil)
- Adejeania brasiliensis (Robineau-Desvoidy, 1830) (Brazil)
- Adejeania brevihirta Curran, 1947 (Venezuela)
- Adejeania brevirostris Curran, 1947 (Mexico)
- Adejeania browni Curran, 1947 (Ecuador, Colombia)
- Adejeania conclusa Curran, 1947 (Brazil)
- Adejeania corpulenta (Wiedemann, 1830) (Mexico)
- Adejeania grandis Guimarães, 1966 (Brazil)
- Adejeania honesta (Rondani, 1851) (Ecuador)
- Adejeania lopesi Guimarães, 1966 (Brazil)
- Adejeania magalhaesi Guimarães, 1966 (Brazil)
- Adejeania marginalis Curran, 1947 (Brazil)
- Adejeania nigrothoracica (Vimmer & Soukup, 1940) (Peru)
- Adejeania palpalis Curran, 1947 (Panama)
- Adejeania pellucens Guimarães, 1966 (Brazil)
- Adejeania rubropilosa Guimarães, 1973 (Ecuador)
- Adejeania rufipalpis (Macquart, 1844) (Mexico)
- Adejeania sabroskyi Guimarães, 1966 (Brazil)
- Adejeania saetigera Guimarães, 1966 (Brazil)
- Adejeania spiniventris Guimarães, 1966 (Brazil)
- Adejeania spinosa Guimarães, 1966 (Brazil)
- Adejeania thompsoni Guimarães, 1966 (Brazil)
- Adejeania townsendi Curran, 1947 (Brazil)
- Adejeania tridens Curran, 1947 (Brazil)
- Adejeania uniformis Curran, 1947 (Brazil)
- Adejeania verrugana (Townsend, 1914) (Peru)
- Adejeania vexatrix (Osten Sacken, 1877) (British Columbia to Montana, South to California and New Mexico, Mexico)
- Adejeania wygodzinskyi Guimarães, 1966 (Brazil)
- Adejeania xanthopilosa Guimarães, 1966 (Brazil)
- Adejeania ypsilon Curran, 1947 (Brazil)
