= A. spinosa =

A. spinosa may refer to:

- Absidia spinosa, a fungus species
- Acanthemblemaria spinosa, a blenny species
- Acanthus spinosa, a flowering plant species
- Acanthopleura spinosa, a chiton species, a primitive marine mollusk
- Adejeania spinosa, a tachinid fly species
- Adenia spinosa, a passionflower species
- Agama spinosa, a small, long-tailed, insect-eating lizard species
- Agathosma spinosa, a small shrub species
- Amorphoscelis spinosa, a praying mantis species
- Almenia spinosa, an arthropod species
- Ancylotrypa spinosa, a wafer trapdoor spider species
- Anotheca spinosa, or Rana De Corona, a frog species
- Aphaenogaster spinosa, a myrmicine ant species
- Arachnura spinosa, an orb-weaving spider species
- Aralia spinosa, a woody plant species
- Argania spinosa, the argan, a tree species
- Atelidea spinosa, a long jawed spider species
- Auximella spinosa, a tangled nest spider species

== See also ==
- Spinosa (disambiguation)
