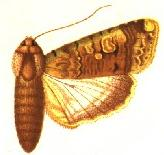

Scientific classification
- Kingdom: Animalia
- Phylum: Arthropoda
- Class: Insecta
- Order: Lepidoptera
- Superfamily: Noctuoidea
- Family: Erebidae
- Genus: Casandria
- Species: C. grandis

Binomial name
- Casandria grandis (Schaus, 1894)

= Casandria grandis =

Species of moth

Casandria grandis is a moth of the family Erebidae found in Mexico. It is possibly synonymous with Casandria emittens.
