= Aenictus gutianshanensis =

Scientific classification
- Kingdom: Animalia
- Phylum: Arthropoda
- Clade: Pancrustacea
- Class: Insecta
- Order: Hymenoptera
- Family: Formicidae
- Genus: Aenictus
- Species: A. gutianshanensis

Binomial name
- Aenictus gutianshanensis Staab, 2014

Species of ant

Aenictus gutianshanensis (named after the type locality) is a Chinese species of army ant in the genus Aenictus. The species is known only from a single colony. Little is known about its biology, but it is probably most closely related to A. vieti.

== Distribution ==
The species is known only from a single colony collected in the subtropical mixed evergreen broad-leaved forest of the Gutianshan National Nature Reserve, southeast China.

== Biology ==
No direct biological information is available. The type series was collected in a single pitfall trap in a secondary mixed evergreen broad-leaved forest. Thus, the species probably lives and forages on and in the leaf-litter preying on small ants of the subfamily Formicinae, as it has been previously reported for species in the Aenictus wroughtonii group. Possible prey species of the genera Prenolepis and Nylanderia are common at the type locality.

== Description ==
The species is probably most closely related to A. vieti, known from North Vietnam and Taiwan. Aenictus gutianshanensis can be easily distinguished from all other species of the Aenictus wroughtonii group by the pronotum, the petiole, and the side of the postpetiole completely finely reticulate. The species is most similar to Aenictus vieti and to Aenictus camposi, but is slightly larger in all measurements. Males of Aenictus gutianshanensis and many other Aenictus species are unknown.

In addition to having the pronotum and petiole completely finely reticulate, Aenictus gutianshanensis can be easily distinguished from Aenictus vieti and Aenictus camposi by the following characters (characters for Aenictus vieti and Aenictus camposi are given in brackets): ventral margin of subpetiolar process almost straight (ventral margin convex), femora densely punctate (smooth and shiny in Jaitrong et al. 2010, but superficially and irregularly sculptured and shiny in two paratypes examined by the reviewer), postpetiolar process more developed with a rim below (less developed, without ventral rim), and longest standing hairs on pronotal dorsum distinctly longer (maximal 0.13 mm).
