= Aenictus mentu =

Scientific classification
- Kingdom: Animalia
- Phylum: Arthropoda
- Clade: Pancrustacea
- Class: Insecta
- Order: Hymenoptera
- Family: Formicidae
- Genus: Aenictus
- Species: A. mentu

Binomial name
- Aenictus mentu Weber, 1942

Species of ant

Aenictus mentu is a species of brown army ant found in Sudan.
