= Aenictus chapmani =

Scientific classification
- Kingdom: Animalia
- Phylum: Arthropoda
- Clade: Pancrustacea
- Class: Insecta
- Order: Hymenoptera
- Family: Formicidae
- Genus: Aenictus
- Species: A. chapmani

Binomial name
- Aenictus chapmani Wilson, 1964

Species of ant

Aenictus chapmani is a species of dark brown army ant found in Papua New Guinea, Philippines, Malaysia, and Indonesia. Specific populations have been studied in the Huon Peninsula and near Dumaguete.
