= Adejeania armata =

Scientific classification
- Domain: Eukaryota
- Kingdom: Animalia
- Phylum: Arthropoda
- Class: Insecta
- Order: Diptera
- Family: Tachinidae
- Genus: Adejeania
- Species: A. armata

Binomial name
- Adejeania armata (Wiedemann, 1830)

Synonyms
- Tachina armata Wiedemann, 1830

Species of fly

Adejeania armata is a species of tachinid flies in the genus Adejeania of the family Tachinidae.
