= Adejeania palpalis =

Scientific classification
- Domain: Eukaryota
- Kingdom: Animalia
- Phylum: Arthropoda
- Class: Insecta
- Order: Diptera
- Family: Tachinidae
- Genus: Adejeania
- Species: A. palpalis

Binomial name
- Adejeania palpalis Curran, 1947

Species of fly

Adejeania palpalis is a species of parasitic fly in the family Tachinidae. It is found in Central America.
