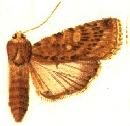

Scientific classification
- Kingdom: Animalia
- Phylum: Arthropoda
- Class: Insecta
- Order: Lepidoptera
- Superfamily: Noctuoidea
- Family: Erebidae
- Genus: Casandria
- Species: C. xylinoides

Binomial name
- Casandria xylinoides Schaus, 1894

Synonyms
- Acanthodica xylinoides

= Casandria xylinoides =

Species of moth

Casandria xylinoides is a moth of the family Erebidae. It is found in Ecuador and Argentina. It is a pollinator of the Argentine saguaro's nighttime flowers.
