= Echeta rhodocyma =

Scientific classification
- Kingdom: Animalia
- Phylum: Arthropoda
- Class: Insecta
- Order: Lepidoptera
- Superfamily: Noctuoidea
- Family: Erebidae
- Subfamily: Arctiinae
- Genus: Echeta
- Species: E. rhodocyma

Binomial name
- Echeta rhodocyma (Hampson, 1909)

Synonyms
- Automolis rhodocyma Hampson, 1909

Species of moth

Echeta rhodocyma is a moth of the family Erebidae. It was described by George Hampson in 1909. It is found in Peru.
