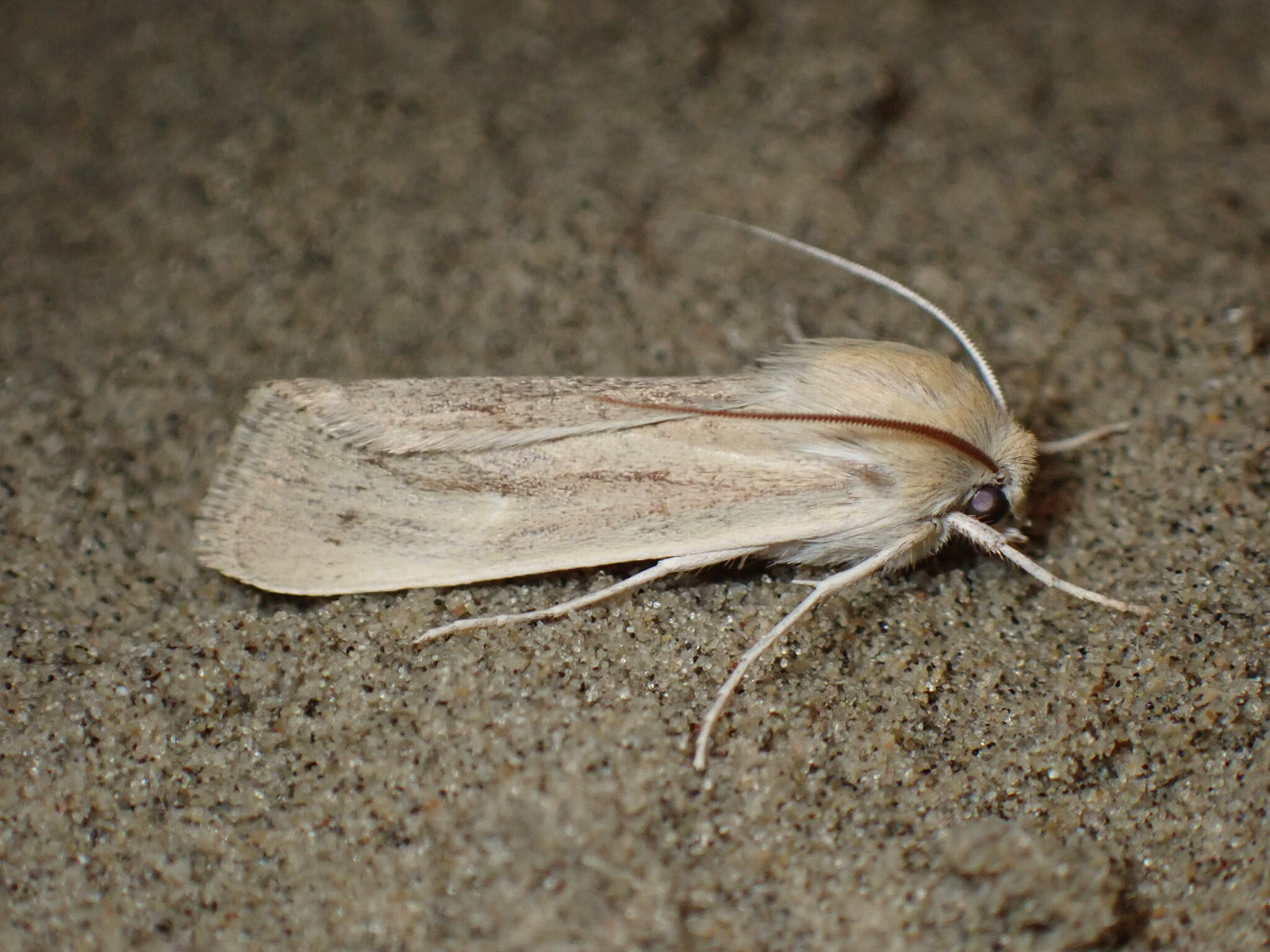

Scientific classification
- Kingdom: Animalia
- Phylum: Arthropoda
- Class: Insecta
- Order: Lepidoptera
- Superfamily: Noctuoidea
- Family: Noctuidae
- Genus: Copablepharon
- Species: C. longipenne

Binomial name
- Copablepharon longipenne Grote, 1882

= Copablepharon longipenne =

Dusky dune moth

Species of moth

Copablepharon longipenne, the dusky dune moth, is a species of moth in the family Noctuidae. The species was first described by Augustus Radcliffe Grote in 1882. It is found in North America from south-western Manitoba to southern Alberta, south to western Texas.

The wingspan is 35–39 mm. Adults are on wing from July to August depending on the location. There is one generation per year.

Larvae live buried about 2.5 cm deep in the soil near the host plant and apparently feed underground. The larvae pupate in the soil, emerging about two and a half weeks later.

== Subspecies ==
- Copablepharon longipenne longipenne Grote, 1882
- Copablepharon longipenne serraticornis A. Blanchard, 1976
