= Echeta rubrireta =

Scientific classification
- Domain: Eukaryota
- Kingdom: Animalia
- Phylum: Arthropoda
- Class: Insecta
- Order: Lepidoptera
- Superfamily: Noctuoidea
- Family: Erebidae
- Subfamily: Arctiinae
- Genus: Echeta
- Species: E. rubrireta

Binomial name
- Echeta rubrireta (Dognin, 1906)

Synonyms
- Automolis rubrireta Dognin, 1906; Automolis rhodographa Dognin, 1914

Species of moth

Echeta rubrireta is a moth of the family Erebidae. It was described by Paul Dognin in 1906. It is found in Peru.
