= Echeta semirosea =

Scientific classification
- Kingdom: Animalia
- Phylum: Arthropoda
- Class: Insecta
- Order: Lepidoptera
- Superfamily: Noctuoidea
- Family: Erebidae
- Subfamily: Arctiinae
- Genus: Echeta
- Species: E. semirosea

Binomial name
- Echeta semirosea (Walker, 1865)

Synonyms
- Automolis semirosea Walker, [1865]

Species of moth

Echeta semirosea is a moth of the family Erebidae. It was described by Francis Walker in 1865. It is found in the Amazon region, French Guiana and Brazil.
