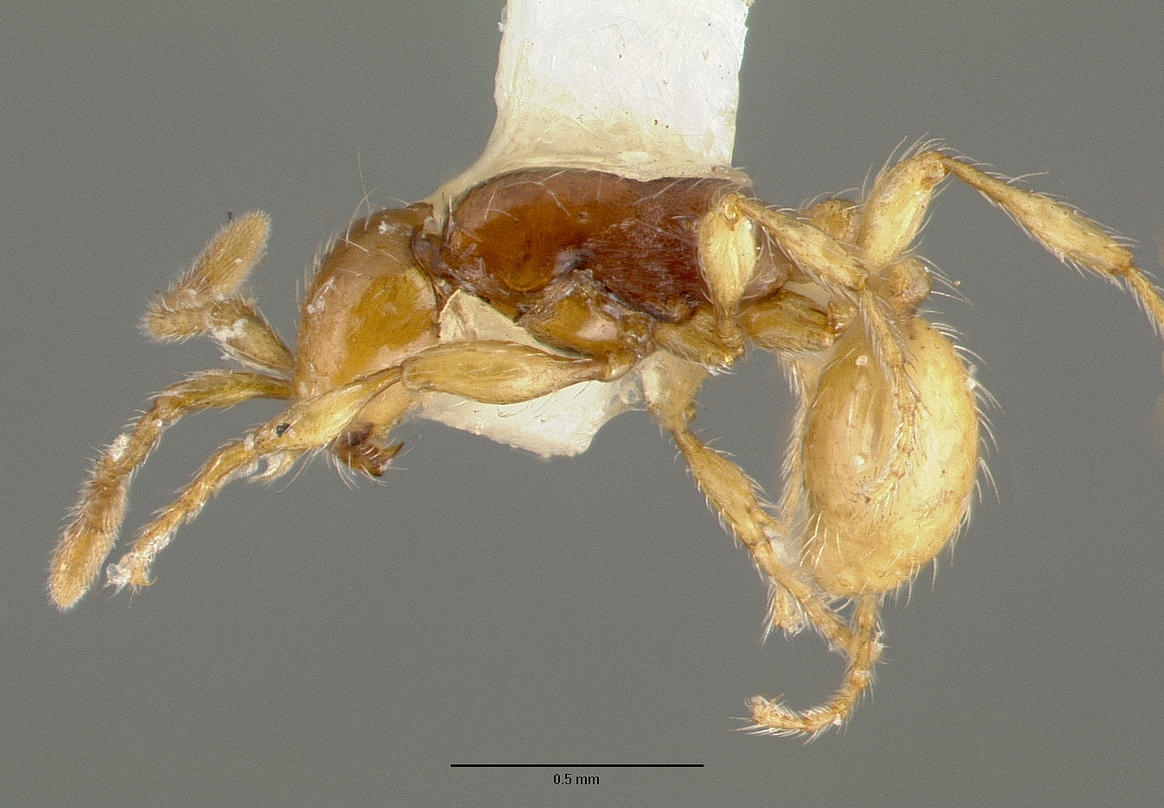
- Aenictus ceylonicus worker from Indonesia

Scientific classification
- Kingdom: Animalia
- Phylum: Arthropoda
- Class: Insecta
- Order: Hymenoptera
- Family: Formicidae
- Subfamily: Dorylinae
- Genus: Aenictus; Shuckard, 1840

Type species
- Aenictus ambiguus

Diversity
- 205 species

Synonyms
- Paraenictus Wheeler, 1929; Typhlatta Smith, 1857

= Aenictus =

Genus of ants

Aenictus is a large army ant genus distributed in the Old World tropics and subtropics. It contains about 181 species, making it one of the larger ant genera of the world.

== Biology and distribution ==
The genus presently has 181 species, distributed through the East Mediterranean, Afrotropical, Oriental, Indo-Australian, and Australian regions. Most of the species are tropical, with terrestrial habitats, foraging in soil, leaf litter, most of the Southeast Asian species forage on the ground, and some on trees and hunting other ant species and termites.

Most species of the genus are specialized predators of other ants, especially of immature stages. Only some Asian species such as Aenictus gracilis, Aenictus laeviceps, Aenictus hodgsoni, and Aenictus paradentatus are known to hunt a variety of invertebrate prey, including ants, using a large number of workers in raids. Foraging raids undertaken by these ants occur both day and night, usually across the ground surface but occasionally also in trees. During raids, numerous workers attack ant nests in a small area, with several workers coordinating their efforts to carry large prey items back to the nest or bivouac. Species of Aenictus are generally small, monomorphic and yellow to dark brown.

== Species ==
- Aenictus abeillei (André, 1886)
- Aenictus acerbus Shattuck, 2008
- Aenictus aitkenii Forel, 1901
- Aenictus alluaudi Santschi, 1910
- Aenictus alticola Wheeler, 1930
- Aenictus ambiguus Shuckard, 1840
- Aenictus anceps Forel, 1910
- Aenictus annae Forel, 1911
- Aenictus appressipilosus Jaitrong & Yamane, 2013
- Aenictus arabicus Sharaf & Aldawood, 2012
- Aenictus aratus Forel, 1900
- Aenictus artipus Wilson, 1964
- Aenictus arya Forel, 1901
- Aenictus asantei Campione et al., 1983
- Aenictus asperivalvus Santschi, 1919
- Aenictus bakeri Menozzi, 1925
- Aenictus baliensis Jaitrong & Yamane, 2013
- Aenictus bayoni Menozzi, 1932
- Aenictus bidentatus Donisthorpe, 1942
- Aenictus binghamii Forel, 1900
- Aenictus biroi Forel, 1907
- Aenictus bobaiensis Zhou & Chen, 1999
- Aenictus bodongjaya Jaitrong & Yamane, 2011
- Aenictus boltoni Gómez, 2022
- Aenictus bottegoi Emery, 1899
- Aenictus breviceps Forel, 1912
- Aenictus brevicornis (Mayr, 1879)
- Aenictus brevinodus Jaitrong & Yamane, 2011
- Aenictus brevipodus Jaitrong & Yamane, 2013
- Aenictus brutus Gómez et al., 2024
- Aenictus buttelreepeni Forel, 1913
- Aenictus buttgenbachi Forel, 1913
- Aenictus camposi Wheeler & Chapman, 1925
- Aenictus carolianus Zettel & Sorger, 2010
- Aenictus certus Westwood, 1842
- Aenictus ceylonicus (Mayr, 1866)
- Aenictus changmaianus Terayama & Kubota, 1993
- Aenictus chapmani Wilson, 1964
- Aenictus chittoorensis Sahoo et al., 2026
- Aenictus clavatus Forel, 1901
- Aenictus clavitibia Forel, 1901
- Aenictus concavus Jaitrong & Yamane, 2013
- Aenictus congolensis Santschi, 1911
- Aenictus cornutus Forel, 1900
- Aenictus crucifer Santschi, 1914
- Aenictus currax Emery, 1900
- Aenictus cylindripetiolus Jaitrong & Yamane, 2013
- Aenictus decolor (Mayr, 1879)
- Aenictus dentatus Forel, 1911
- Aenictus diclops Shattuck, 2008
- Aenictus dirangensis Dhadwal & Bharti, 2023
- Aenictus dlusskyi Arnol'di, 1968
- Aenictus doryloides Wilson, 1964
- Aenictus doydeei Jaitrong & Yamane, 2011
- Aenictus duengkaei Jaitrong & Yamane, 2012
- Aenictus eguchii Jaitrong & Yamane, 2013
- Aenictus eugenii Emery, 1895
- Aenictus exilis Wilson, 1964
- Aenictus feae Emery, 1889
- Aenictus fergusoni Forel, 1901
- Aenictus foreli Santschi, 1919
- Aenictus formosensis Forel, 1913
- Aenictus fuchuanensis Zhou, 2001
- Aenictus fulvus Jaitrong & Yamane, 2011
- Aenictus furculatus Santschi, 1919
- Aenictus fuscipennis Forel, 1913
- Aenictus fuscovarius Gerstäcker, 1859
- Aenictus gibbosus Dalla Torre, 1893
- Aenictus glabratus Jaitrong & Nur-Zati, 2010
- Aenictus glabrinotum Jaitrong & Yamane, 2011
- Aenictus gleadowii Forel, 1901
- Aenictus gonioccipus Jaitrong & Yamane, 2013
- Aenictus gracilis Emery, 1893
- Aenictus grandis Bingham, 1903
- Aenictus guineensis Santschi, 1924
- Aenictus gutianshanensis Staab, 2014
- Aenictus hamifer Emery, 1896
- Aenictus henanensis Li & Wang, 2005
- Aenictus hilli Clark, 1928
- Aenictus hitai Gómez, 2022
- Aenictus hodgsoni Forel, 1901
- Aenictus hoelldobleri Staab, 2015
- Aenictus hottai Terayama & Yamane, 1989
- Aenictus humeralis Santschi, 1910
- Aenictus huonicus Wilson, 1964
- Aenictus icarus Forel, 1911
- Aenictus idoneus Menozzi, 1928
- Aenictus inconspicuus Westwood, 1845
- Aenictus indicus Bharti et al., 2012
- Aenictus inflatus Yamane & Hashimoto, 1999
- Aenictus itoi Jaitrong & Yamane, 2013
- Aenictus jacki Gómez, 2022
- Aenictus jacobsoni Forel, 1909
- Aenictus jarujini Jaitrong & Yamane, 2010
- Aenictus javanus Emery, 1896
- Aenictus jawadwipa Jaitrong & Yamane, 2013
- Aenictus kadalarensis Sahoo et al., 2023
- Aenictus khaoyaiensis Jaitrong & Yamane, 2013
- Aenictus kodaguensis Sahoo et al., 2024
- Aenictus kodagura Shakur & Bagchi, 2024
- Aenictus kodungallurensis Antony & Prasad, 2022
- Aenictus koloi Gómez, 2022
- Aenictus kutai Jaitrong & Wiwatwitaya, 2013
- Aenictus laeviceps (Smith, 1857)
- Aenictus lankamallensis Sahoo et al., 2026
- Aenictus latifemoratus Terayama & Yamane, 1989
- Aenictus latiscapus Forel, 1901
- Aenictus leliepvrei Bernard, 1953
- Aenictus leptotyphlatta Jaitrong & Eguchi, 2010
- Aenictus levior (Karavaiev, 1926)
- Aenictus lifuiae Terayama, 1984
- Aenictus longi Forel, 1901
- Aenictus longicephalus Jaitrong & Yamane, 2013
- Aenictus longinodus Jaitrong & Yamane, 2012
- Aenictus luteus Emery, 1892
- Aenictus luzoni Wheeler & Chapman, 1925
- Aenictus malakkaparensis Antony & Prasad, 2022
- Aenictus maneerati Jaitrong & Yamane, 2013
- Aenictus mariae Emery, 1895
- Aenictus mauritanicus Santschi, 1910
- Aenictus mentu Weber, 1942
- Aenictus minimus Jaitrong & Hashimoto, 2012
- Aenictus minipetiolus Jaitrong & Yamane, 2013
- Aenictus minutulus Terayama & Yamane, 1989
- Aenictus mocsaryi Emery, 1901
- Aenictus moebii Emery, 1895
- Aenictus montivagus Jaitrong & Yamane, 2011
- Aenictus mutatus Santschi, 1913
- Aenictus mvuvii Gómez, 2022
- Aenictus nesiotis Wheeler, 1930
- Aenictus nganduensis Wilson, 1964
- Aenictus nishimurai Terayama & Kubota, 1993
- Aenictus nuchiti Jaitrong & Ruangsittichai, 2018
- Aenictus nyuyi Gómez, 2022
- Aenictus obscurus Smith, 1865
- Aenictus orientalis (Karavaiev, 1926)
- Aenictus pachycerus (Smith, 1858)
- Aenictus pangantihoni Zettel & Sorger, 2010
- Aenictus paradentatus Jaitrong et al., 2012
- Aenictus parahuonicus Jaitrong & Yamane, 2011
- Aenictus peguensis Emery, 1895
- Aenictus pfeifferi Zettel & Sorger, 2010
- Aenictus pharao Santschi, 1924
- Aenictus philiporum Wilson, 1964
- Aenictus philippinensis Chapman, 1963
- Aenictus piercei Wheeler, 1930
- Aenictus pilosus Jaitrong & Yamane, 2013
- Aenictus pinkaewi Jaitrong & Yamane, 2013
- Aenictus popeyei Gómez, 2022
- Aenictus porizonoides Walker, 1860
- Aenictus powersi Wheeler, 1930
- Aenictus prolixus Shattuck, 2008
- Aenictus pubescens Smith, 1859
- Aenictus punctatus Jaitrong & Yamane, 2012
- Aenictus punctiventris Emery, 1901
- Aenictus punensis Forel, 1901
- Aenictus rabori Chapman, 1963
- Aenictus raptor Forel, 1913
- Aenictus reyesi Chapman, 1963
- Aenictus rhodiensis Menozzi, 1936
- Aenictus rixator Emery, 1901
- Aenictus rotundatus Mayr, 1901
- Aenictus rotundicollis Jaitrong & Yamane, 2011
- Aenictus rougieri André, 1893
- Aenictus sagei Forel, 1901
- Aenictus samungi Jaitrong & Ruangsittichai, 2018
- Aenictus schneirlai Wilson, 1964
- Aenictus shilintongae Jaitrong & Schultz, 2016
- Aenictus shillongensis Mathew & Tiwari, 2000
- Aenictus shuckardi Forel, 1901
- Aenictus siamensis Jaitrong & Yamane, 2011
- Aenictus sirenicus Yamane & Wang, 2015
- Aenictus siamensis Jaitrong & Yamane, 2011
- Aenictus sonchaengi Jaitrong & Yamane, 2011
- Aenictus soudanicus Santschi, 1910
- Aenictus spathifer Santschi, 1928
- Aenictus steindachneri Mayr, 1901
- Aenictus stenocephalus Jaitrong et al., 2010
- Aenictus subterraneus Jaitrong & Hashimoto, 2012
- Aenictus sulawesiensis Jaitrong & Wiwatwitaya, 2013
- Aenictus sumatrensis Forel, 1913
- Aenictus sundalandensis Jaitrong & Yamane, 2013
- Aenictus susanae Gómez, 2022
- Aenictus thailandianus Terayama & Kubota, 1993
- Aenictus togoensis Santschi, 1915
- Aenictus trigonus Forel, 1911
- Aenictus turneri Forel, 1900
- Aenictus ugaduwensis Gómez, 2022
- Aenictus vagans Santschi, 1924
- Aenictus vaucheri Emery, 1915
- Aenictus vieti Jaitrong et al., 2010
- Aenictus villiersi Bernard, 1953
- Aenictus watanasiti Jaitrong & Yamane, 2013
- Aenictus wayani Jaitrong & Yamane, 2011
- Aenictus weissi Santschi, 1910
- Aenictus westwoodi Forel, 1901
- Aenictus wilaiae Jaitrong & Yamane, 2013
- Aenictus wilsoni Bharti et al., 2012
- Aenictus wiwatwitayai Jaitrong & Yamane, 2013
- Aenictus wroughtonii Forel, 1890
- Aenictus wudangshanensis Wang, 2006
- Aenictus xegi Gómez, 2022
- Aenictus yamanei Wiwatwitaya & Jaitrong, 2011
- Aenictus yangi Liu et al., 2015
- Aenictus zhengi Zhang, 1995
