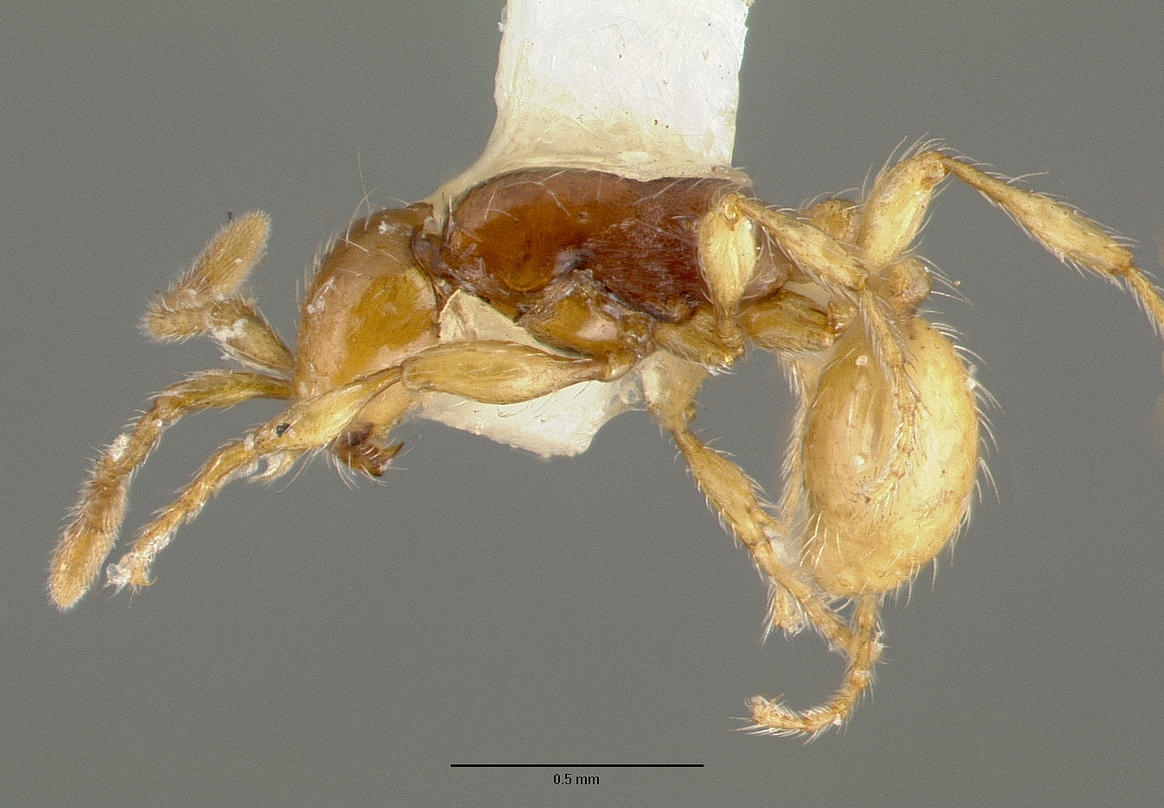
- Aenictus ceylonicus worker

Scientific classification
- Kingdom: Animalia
- Phylum: Arthropoda
- Clade: Pancrustacea
- Class: Insecta
- Order: Hymenoptera
- Family: Formicidae
- Genus: Aenictus
- Species: A. ceylonicus

Binomial name
- Aenictus ceylonicus (Mayr, 1866)

= Aenictus ceylonicus =

Species of ant

Aenictus ceylonicus is a species of reddish brown army ant found in Southern India, Sri Lanka, Southeast Asia and Australia. They are completely blind and around 3 mm in length. These ants are seen foraging underneath leaf litter in forests and well-vegetated areas, travelling in a trail of in three or more columns alongside each other, in parts of India. Their antennae, as in most species of Aenictus, have ten segments. The scape is long and extends above the head. The head is smooth and shiny. The mesosoma and the head region are dark brown, while the gaster is oval and lighter in colour, nearly translucent. The mesosoma is broad anteriorly and strongly compressed posteriorly. The petiole and the post petiole are large, conical and shining. They occur in rainforests and moist deciduous forests building temporary nests on the ground and in rotting logs.

Like others in the genus, they prey on ants, social wasps and other arthropods. Some forms of the species such as formosensis of Taiwan were earlier considered separate species.
