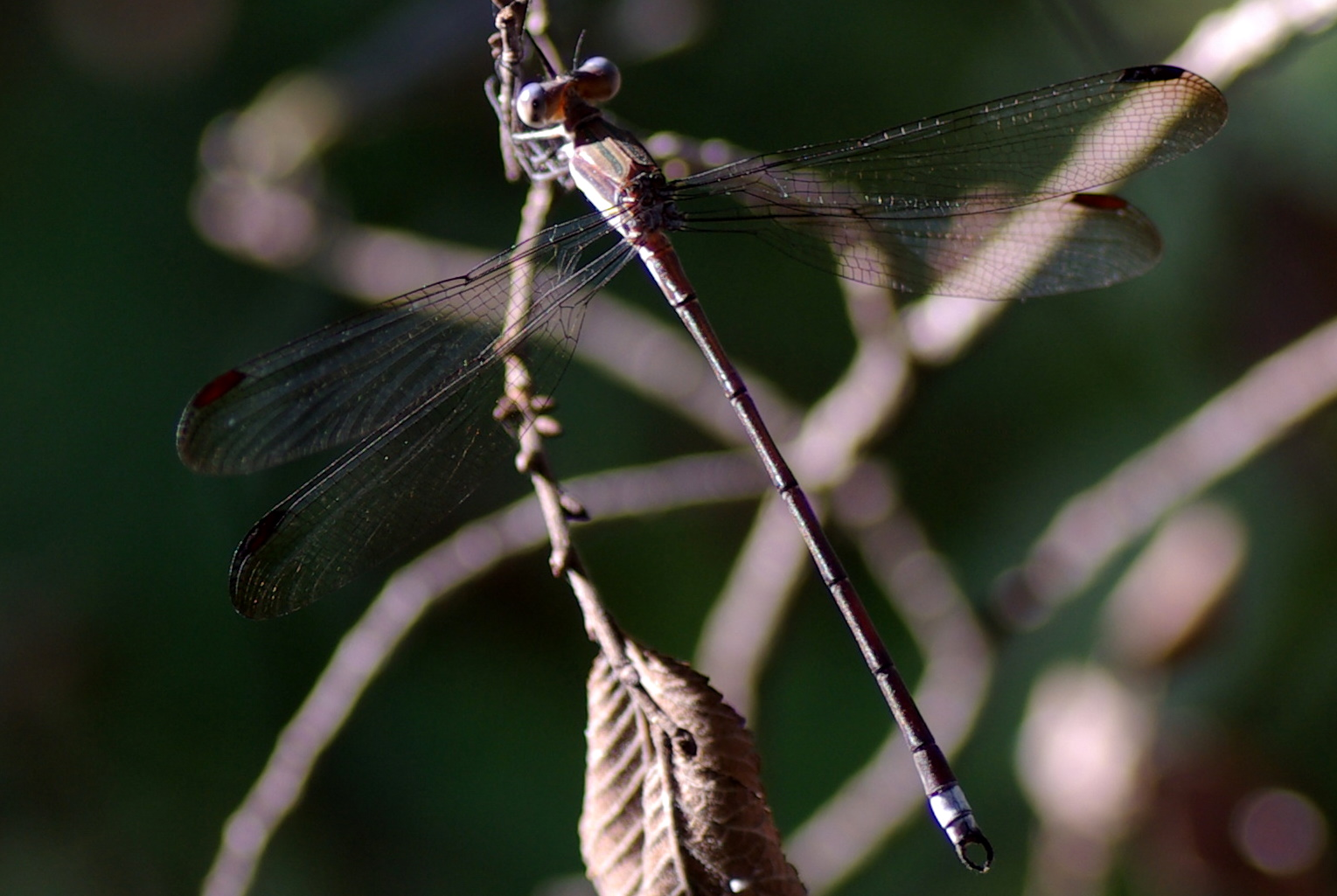
- Archilestes grandis

Scientific classification
- Kingdom: Animalia
- Phylum: Arthropoda
- Class: Insecta
- Order: Odonata
- Suborder: Zygoptera
- Family: Lestidae
- Genus: Archilestes; Selys, 1862

= Archilestes =

Genus of damselflies

Archilestes is a genus of damselflies in the family Lestidae, commonly known as stream spreadwings. The genus contains eight species found in the Americas, with the great spreadwing (A. grandis) and California spreadwing (A. californicus) being the most common and widespread.

== Description ==
Archilestes are among the largest damselflies, with adults ranging from 41 to 60 millimetres (1.6 to 2.4 in) in length. They have a more robust build than other members of Lestidae, with relatively short wings in proportion to their elongated abdomens. The coloration is tan to brown with black markings; unlike the related genus Lestes, Archilestes lack the metallic bronze or green highlights typical of other spreadwings.

Males have blue eyes and distinctive pincer-like terminal abdominal appendages, which are useful for species identification. Females are similar but have brown eyes and a more rounded abdominal tip with a well-developed ovipositor.

== Behaviour ==
Like most members of Lestidae, Archilestes rest with their wings spread out at an angle to the body rather than folded together above the abdomen, which is the typical resting posture for most damselflies. This behaviour gives the family its common name. Spreadwings may close their wings under certain conditions such as poor weather, nightfall, threat from predators, or male harassment of females.

Males perch over water and defend small territories, seizing females upon arrival. When startled, individuals often return to the same perch or a nearby one. Adults are predators, feeding on small flying insects; larvae prey on aquatic invertebrates including mosquito larvae, mayfly larvae, and freshwater shrimp.

== Life cycle ==
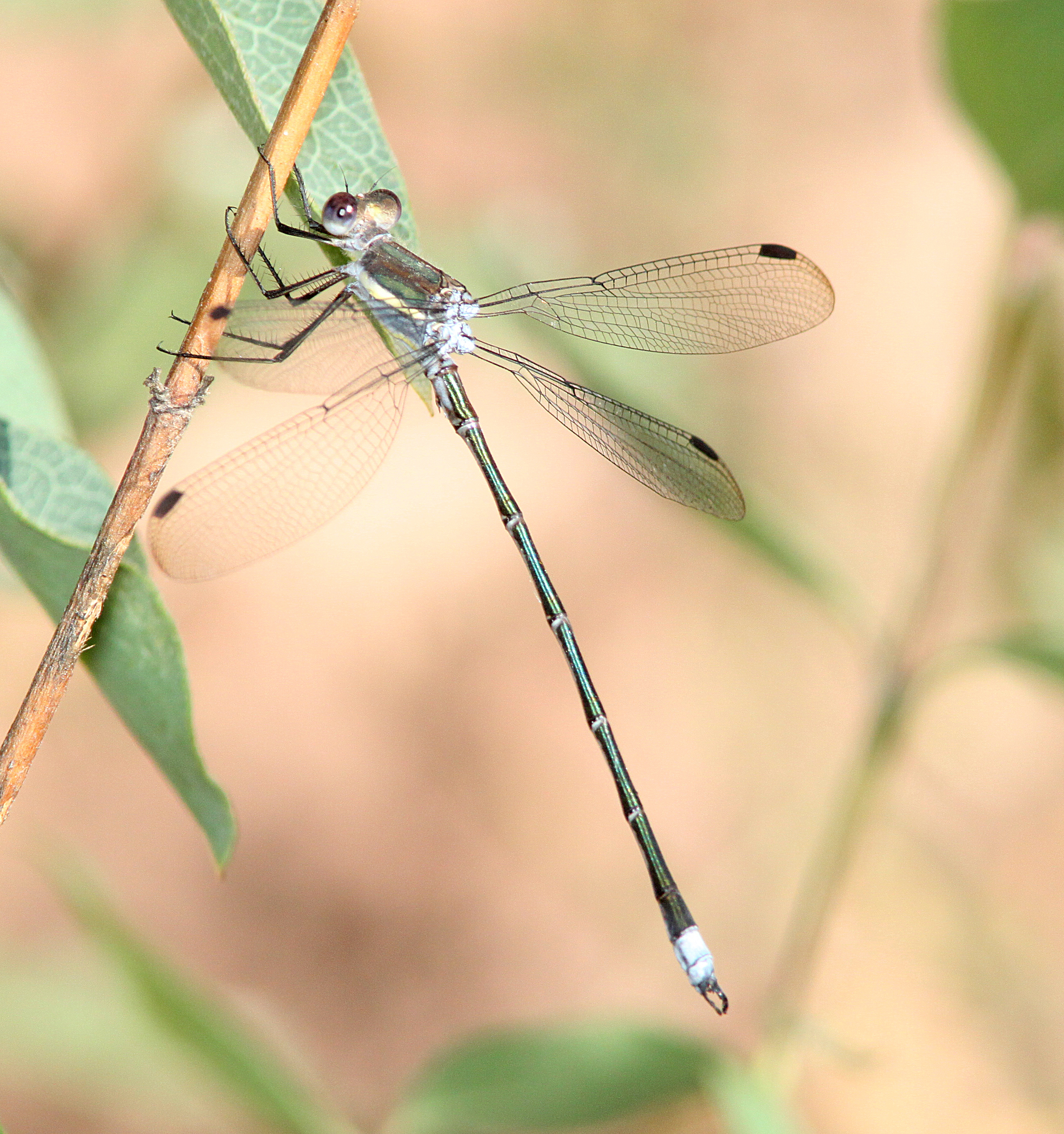
Male Archilestes grandis

Females oviposit in woody stems and plant tissue that overhang the water, rather than in aquatic vegetation like many other damselflies. Eggs are laid in tandem, with males clasping females during oviposition. A female may lay up to 230 eggs over a period of 15 minutes to 3 hours.

The naiads (larvae) are long and slender, typically 25 to 30 millimetres (0.98 to 1.18 in), with a dark brown coloration and a light stripe along the centre of the abdomen. They live in pools and backwaters, and are active underwater hunters and vigorous swimmers compared to other damselfly naiads. Some Archilestes larvae, such as those of A. grandis, may float near the water surface for extended periods. The naiads can sometimes be observed in winter, basking in sun-warmed shallow water.

Adults typically live for approximately six months after emerging from the water.

== Habitat and distribution ==
Archilestes species are typically found near slow-moving streams, often with overhanging alder or willow trees, as well as wetlands, ponds, and temporary pools. They breed readily in heavily vegetated water gardens with unpolluted water.

The genus is restricted to the Americas. The great spreadwing (A. grandis) and California spreadwing (A. californicus) are found in North and Central America, with A. grandis having expanded its range northward and eastward since the 1920s. Several species are endemic to Central America (A. latialatus, A. neblina, A. regalis, A. tuberalatus), while A. exoletus and A. guayaraca are found in South America.

== Species ==
The genus contains the following species:

Male	Female	Scientific name	Common name	Distribution
		Archilestes californicus McLachlan, 1895	California spreadwing	Central America and North America
		Archilestes exoletus (Hagen in Selys, 1862)		South America
		Archilestes grandis (Rambur, 1842)	Great spreadwing	Western and southern North America, Central America, northern South America
		Archilestes guayaraca De Marmels, 1982		South America
		Archilestes latialatus Donnelly, 1981		Central America
		Archilestes neblina Garrison, 1982		Central America
		Archilestes regalis Gloyd, 1944		Central America
		Archilestes tuberalatus (Williamson, 1921)		Central America
