= Adejeania brevirostris =

Scientific classification
- Domain: Eukaryota
- Kingdom: Animalia
- Phylum: Arthropoda
- Class: Insecta
- Order: Diptera
- Family: Tachinidae
- Genus: Adejeania
- Species: A. brevirostris

Binomial name
- Adejeania brevirostris Curran, 1947

Species of fly

Adejeania brevirostris is a species of parasitic fly in the family Tachinidae. It is found in Mexico.
