= Echeta brunneireta =

Scientific classification
- Domain: Eukaryota
- Kingdom: Animalia
- Phylum: Arthropoda
- Class: Insecta
- Order: Lepidoptera
- Superfamily: Noctuoidea
- Family: Erebidae
- Subfamily: Arctiinae
- Genus: Echeta
- Species: E. brunneireta

Binomial name
- Echeta brunneireta (Dognin, 1906)

Synonyms
- Automolis brunneireta Dognin, 1906

Species of moth

Echeta brunneireta is a moth of the family Erebidae. It was described by Paul Dognin in 1906. It is found in Peru.
