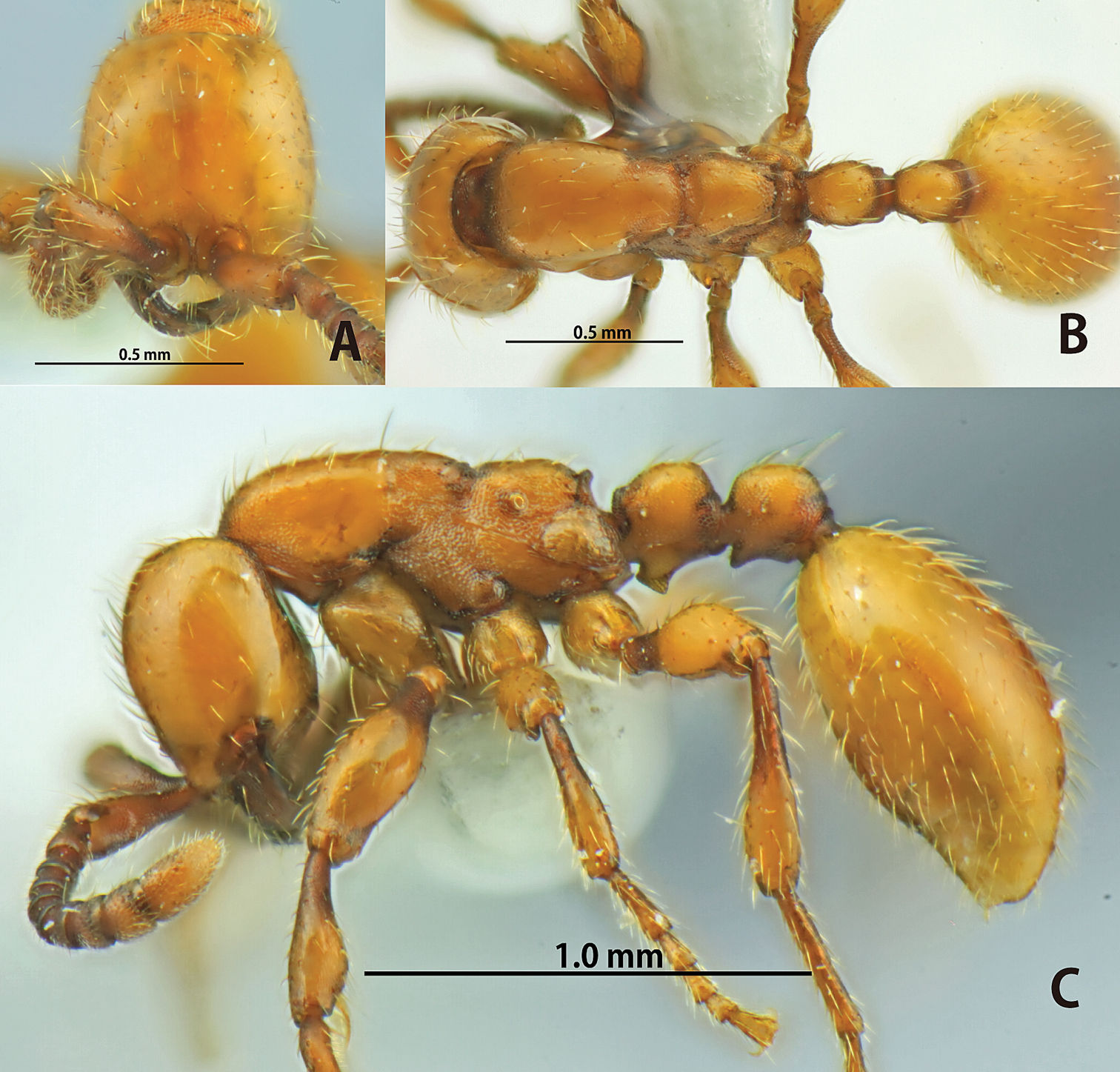
- Aenictus brevipodus worker

Scientific classification
- Kingdom: Animalia
- Phylum: Arthropoda
- Clade: Pancrustacea
- Class: Insecta
- Order: Hymenoptera
- Family: Formicidae
- Genus: Aenictus
- Species: A. brevipodus

Binomial name
- Aenictus brevipodus Jaitrong & Yamane, 2013

= Aenictus brevipodus =

Species of ant

Aenictus brevipodus is a species of ant in the Dorylinae subfamily. It was first described in 2013 by Weeyawat Jaitrong and Seiki Yamane.
