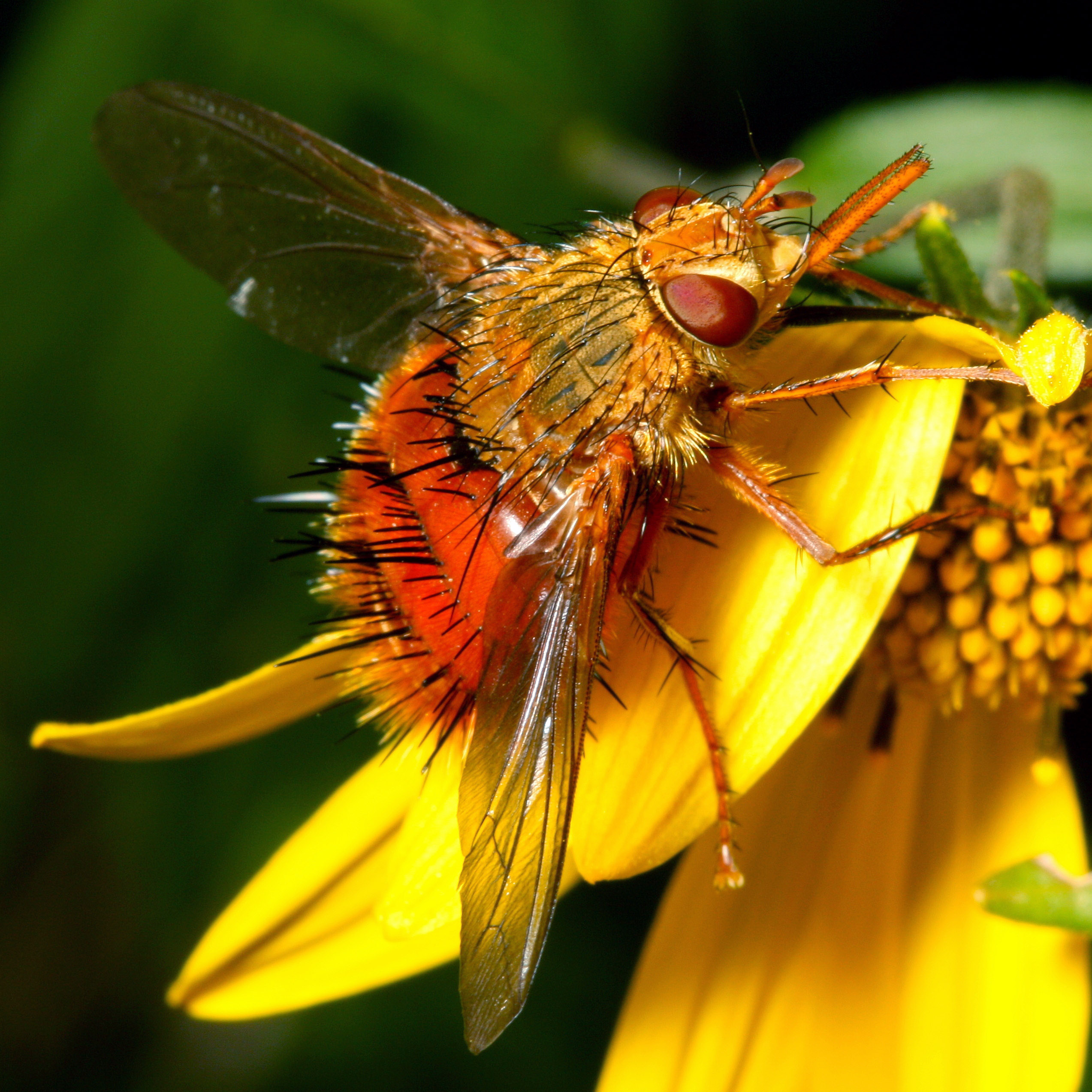

Scientific classification
- Kingdom: Animalia
- Phylum: Arthropoda
- Class: Insecta
- Order: Diptera
- Family: Tachinidae
- Genus: Adejeania
- Species: A. vexatrix

Binomial name
- Adejeania vexatrix (Osten Sacken, 1877)

Synonyms
- Dejeania vexatrix Osten Sacken, 1877

= Adejeania vexatrix =

Species of fly

Adejeania vexatrix is a species of fly in the family Tachinidae. It is found in western North America from Mexico to British Columbia. In addition to its bright orange abdomen and prominent, heavy black setae, this species is noted for its greatly elongated palpi, which stick straight forward from under the fly's head. A similar looking tachinid fly, Hystricia abrupta, is found in the eastern United States. It does not have the elongated mouthparts of A. vexatrix. Paradejeania rutilioides also looks similar.
