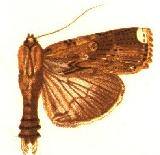

Scientific classification
- Kingdom: Animalia
- Phylum: Arthropoda
- Class: Insecta
- Order: Lepidoptera
- Superfamily: Noctuoidea
- Family: Erebidae
- Genus: Casandria
- Species: C. drucei

Binomial name
- Casandria drucei (Dognin, 1889)

Synonyms
- Calocampa drucei Dognin, 1889

= Casandria drucei =

Species of moth

Casandria drucei is a moth of the family Erebidae first described by Paul Dognin in 1889. It is found in Ecuador.
