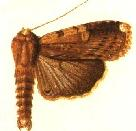

Scientific classification
- Kingdom: Animalia
- Phylum: Arthropoda
- Class: Insecta
- Order: Lepidoptera
- Superfamily: Noctuoidea
- Family: Erebidae
- Genus: Casandria
- Species: C. lignaris

Binomial name
- Casandria lignaris (Schaus, 1894)

= Casandria lignaris =

Species of moth

Casandria lignaris is a moth of the family Erebidae. It is found in South America, including Peru.
