= Echeta =

Scientific classification
- Domain: Eukaryota
- Kingdom: Animalia
- Phylum: Arthropoda
- Class: Insecta
- Order: Lepidoptera
- Superfamily: Noctuoidea
- Family: Erebidae
- Subfamily: Arctiinae
- Subtribe: Phaegopterina
- Genus: Echeta; Herrich-Schäffer, [1855]

Genus of moths

Echeta is a genus of moths in the family Erebidae. The genus was erected by Gottlieb August Wilhelm Herrich-Schäffer in 1855.

== Species ==
- Echeta brunneireta Dognin, 1906
- Echeta divisa Herrich-Schäffer, 1855
- Echeta excavata Schaus, 1910
- Echeta grandis Druce, 1883
- Echeta juno Schaus, 1892
- Echeta milesi Rothschild, 1922
- Echeta minerva Schaus, 1915
- Echeta pandiona Stoll, 1782
- Echeta rhodocyma Hampson, 1909
- Echeta rubrireta Dognin, 1906
- Echeta semirosea Walker, 1865
- Echeta subtruncata Rothschild, 1909
- Echeta trinotata Reich, 1933
