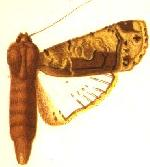

Scientific classification
- Kingdom: Animalia
- Phylum: Arthropoda
- Class: Insecta
- Order: Lepidoptera
- Superfamily: Noctuoidea
- Family: Erebidae
- Genus: Casandria
- Species: C. hages

Binomial name
- Casandria hages (Druce, 1900)

Synonyms
- Acanthodica hages Druce, 1900

= Casandria hages =

Species of moth

Casandria hages is a moth of the family Erebidae. It is found in Colombia.
