= Adejeania pellucens =

Scientific classification
- Domain: Eukaryota
- Kingdom: Animalia
- Phylum: Arthropoda
- Class: Insecta
- Order: Diptera
- Family: Tachinidae
- Genus: Adejeania
- Species: A. pellucens

Binomial name
- Adejeania pellucens Guimaraes, 1966

Species of fly

Adejeania pellucens is a species of parasitic fly in the family Tachinidae. It is found in South America.
