= Casandria albiplena =

Scientific classification
- Kingdom: Animalia
- Phylum: Arthropoda
- Clade: Pancrustacea
- Class: Insecta
- Order: Lepidoptera
- Superfamily: Noctuoidea
- Family: Erebidae
- Genus: Casandria
- Species: C. albiplena

Binomial name
- Casandria albiplena Prout, 1919

Species of moth

Casandria albiplena is a moth of the family Erebidae. It is found in Colombia.
