= Protodejeania hystricosa =

Scientific classification
- Kingdom: Animalia
- Phylum: Arthropoda
- Class: Insecta
- Order: Diptera
- Family: Tachinidae
- Subfamily: Tachininae
- Tribe: Tachinini
- Genus: Protodejeania
- Species: P. hystricosa

Binomial name
- Protodejeania hystricosa (Williston, 1886)

Synonyms
- Dejeania hystricosa Williston, 1886; Protodejeania willistoni Curran, 1947

Species of fly

Protodejeania hystricosa is a species of bristle fly in the family Tachinidae.

== Distribution ==
Canada, United States, Costa Rica, Mexico.
