= Adejeania rufipalpis =

Scientific classification
- Kingdom: Animalia
- Phylum: Arthropoda
- Class: Insecta
- Order: Diptera
- Family: Tachinidae
- Genus: Adejeania
- Species: A. rufipalpis

Binomial name
- Adejeania rufipalpis (Macquart, 1843)

Species of fly

Adejeania rufipalpis is a species of parasitic fly in the family Tachinidae. It is found in Mexico.
