= Echeta milesi =

Scientific classification
- Domain: Eukaryota
- Kingdom: Animalia
- Phylum: Arthropoda
- Class: Insecta
- Order: Lepidoptera
- Superfamily: Noctuoidea
- Family: Erebidae
- Subfamily: Arctiinae
- Genus: Echeta
- Species: E. milesi

Binomial name
- Echeta milesi (Rothschild, 1922)

Synonyms
- Automolis milesi Rothschild, 1922

Species of moth

Echeta milesi is a moth of the family Erebidae. It was described by Walter Rothschild in 1922. It is found in Brazil.
