= Protodejeania echinata =

Scientific classification
- Kingdom: Animalia
- Phylum: Arthropoda
- Class: Insecta
- Order: Diptera
- Family: Tachinidae
- Subfamily: Tachininae
- Tribe: Tachinini
- Genus: Protodejeania
- Species: P. echinata

Binomial name
- Protodejeania echinata (Thomson, 1869)

Synonyms
- Jurinea echinata Thomson, 1869

Species of fly

Protodejeania echinata is a species of bristle fly in the family Tachinidae.

== Distribution ==
Canada, United States.
