= Archilestes latialatus =

Scientific classification
- Domain: Eukaryota
- Kingdom: Animalia
- Phylum: Arthropoda
- Class: Insecta
- Order: Odonata
- Suborder: Zygoptera
- Family: Lestidae
- Genus: Archilestes
- Species: A. latialatus

Binomial name
- Archilestes latialatus Donnelly, 1981

Species of damselfly

Archilestes latialatus is a species of spreadwing in the damselfly family Lestidae. It is found in Central America.
