= Aenictus raptor =

Scientific classification
- Kingdom: Animalia
- Phylum: Arthropoda
- Clade: Pancrustacea
- Class: Insecta
- Order: Hymenoptera
- Family: Formicidae
- Genus: Aenictus
- Species: A. raptor

Binomial name
- Aenictus raptor Forel, 1913

Species of ant

Aenictus raptor is a species of light brown army ant found in the Democratic Republic of the Congo.
