= Adejeania analis =

Scientific classification
- Kingdom: Animalia
- Phylum: Arthropoda
- Class: Insecta
- Order: Diptera
- Family: Tachinidae
- Subfamily: Tachininae
- Tribe: Tachinini
- Genus: Adejeania
- Species: A. analis

Binomial name
- Adejeania analis (Macquart, 1843)

Synonyms
- Dejeania analis Macquart, 1844

Species of fly

Adejeania analis is a species of parasitic fly in the family Tachinidae.

== Distribution ==
Colombia.
