= Adejeania andina =

Scientific classification
- Kingdom: Animalia
- Phylum: Arthropoda
- Class: Insecta
- Order: Diptera
- Family: Tachinidae
- Subfamily: Tachininae
- Tribe: Tachinini
- Genus: Adejeania
- Species: A. andina

Binomial name
- Adejeania andina (Townsend, 1912)

Synonyms
- Dejeania andina Townsend, 1912

Species of fly

Adejeania andina is a species of parasitic fly in the family Tachinidae.

== Distribution ==
Peru.
