= Casandria daunus =

Scientific classification
- Kingdom: Animalia
- Phylum: Arthropoda
- Class: Insecta
- Order: Lepidoptera
- Superfamily: Noctuoidea
- Family: Erebidae
- Genus: Casandria
- Species: C. daunus

Binomial name
- Casandria daunus (Druce, 1894)

Synonyms
- Agrotis daunus Druce, 1894; Acanthodica daunus Druce, 1894

Species of moth

Casandria daunus is a moth of the family Erebidae. It is found in Mexico.
