= Copablepharon absidum =

Scientific classification
- Domain: Eukaryota
- Kingdom: Animalia
- Phylum: Arthropoda
- Class: Insecta
- Order: Lepidoptera
- Superfamily: Noctuoidea
- Family: Noctuidae
- Genus: Copablepharon
- Species: C. absidum

Binomial name
- Copablepharon absidum (Harvey, 1875)

Synonyms
- Ablepharon absidum Harvey, 1875; Copablepharon absida Barnes & McDunnough, 1917

Species of moth

The Columbia dune moth (Copablepharon absidum) is a moth of the family Noctuidae. It is found from British Columbia, south through Colorado to California.
