= Echeta trinotata =

Scientific classification
- Domain: Eukaryota
- Kingdom: Animalia
- Phylum: Arthropoda
- Class: Insecta
- Order: Lepidoptera
- Superfamily: Noctuoidea
- Family: Erebidae
- Subfamily: Arctiinae
- Genus: Echeta
- Species: E. trinotata

Binomial name
- Echeta trinotata (Reich, 1933)

Synonyms
- Automolis trinotata Reich, 1933

Species of moth

Echeta trinotata is a moth of the family Erebidae. It was described by Reich in 1933. It is found in French Guiana, Brazil, Venezuela, Ecuador, Chile, and Bolivia.
