= Casandria splendens =

Scientific classification
- Kingdom: Animalia
- Phylum: Arthropoda
- Class: Insecta
- Order: Lepidoptera
- Superfamily: Noctuoidea
- Family: Erebidae
- Genus: Casandria
- Species: C. splendens

Binomial name
- Casandria splendens (Druce, 1889)

Synonyms
- Acanthodica splendens Druce, 1889; Agrotis splendens Druce, 1889; Magusa apicimacula Maassen, 1890

Species of moth

Casandria splendens is a moth of the family Erebidae. It is found in Panama.
