= Aenictus asantei =

Scientific classification
- Kingdom: Animalia
- Phylum: Arthropoda
- Clade: Pancrustacea
- Class: Insecta
- Order: Hymenoptera
- Family: Formicidae
- Genus: Aenictus
- Species: A. asantei

Binomial name
- Aenictus asantei Campione, Novak & Gotwald, 1983

Species of ant

Aenictus asantei is a species of brown army ant found in Nigeria and Ghana. The species has been observed column raiding Pheidole juveniles. It is named for the Asante people.
