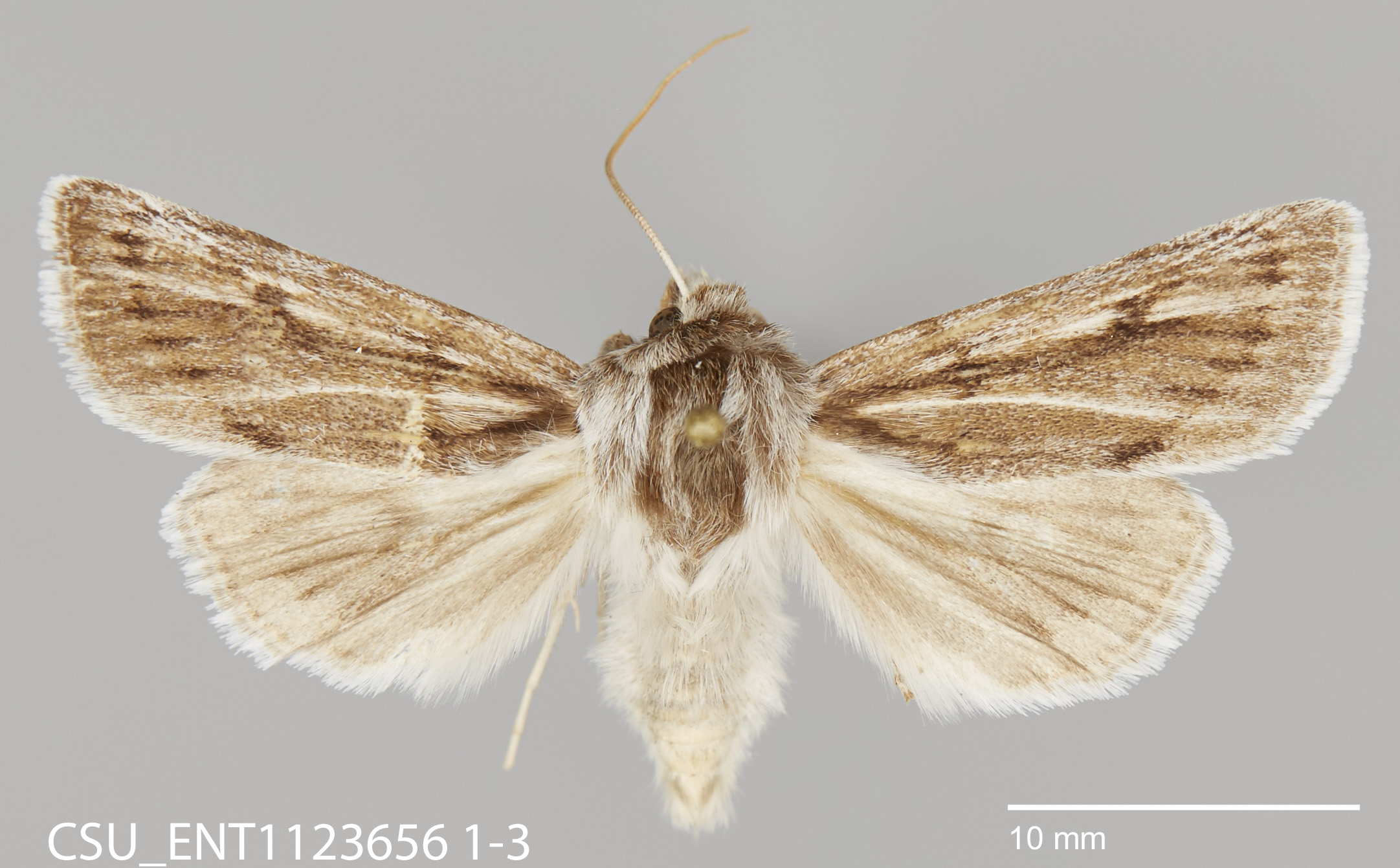

Scientific classification
- Kingdom: Animalia
- Phylum: Arthropoda
- Clade: Pancrustacea
- Class: Insecta
- Order: Lepidoptera
- Superfamily: Noctuoidea
- Family: Noctuidae
- Genus: Copablepharon
- Species: C. robertsoni

Binomial name
- Copablepharon robertsoni L. G. Crabo & Lafontaine in Lafontaine, 2004

= Copablepharon robertsoni =

Species of moth

Copablepharon robertsoni is a species of cutworm or dart moth in the family Noctuidae. It is found in North America.
