= Echeta minerva =

Scientific classification
- Domain: Eukaryota
- Kingdom: Animalia
- Phylum: Arthropoda
- Class: Insecta
- Order: Lepidoptera
- Superfamily: Noctuoidea
- Family: Erebidae
- Subfamily: Arctiinae
- Genus: Echeta
- Species: E. minerva

Binomial name
- Echeta minerva (Schaus, 1915)

Synonyms
- Pseudalus minerva Schaus, 1915

Species of moth

Echeta minerva is a moth of the family Erebidae. It was described by William Schaus in 1915. It is found in Brazil.
