= Aenictus luteus =

Scientific classification
- Kingdom: Animalia
- Phylum: Arthropoda
- Clade: Pancrustacea
- Class: Insecta
- Order: Hymenoptera
- Family: Formicidae
- Genus: Aenictus
- Species: A. luteus

Binomial name
- Aenictus luteus Emery, 1892

Species of ant

Aenictus luteus is a species of brown army ant found in Sierra Leone and Cote D'Ivoire.
