= Aenictus hilli =

Scientific classification
- Kingdom: Animalia
- Phylum: Arthropoda
- Clade: Pancrustacea
- Class: Insecta
- Order: Hymenoptera
- Family: Formicidae
- Genus: Aenictus
- Species: A. hilli

Binomial name
- Aenictus hilli Clark, 1928

Species of ant

Aenictus hilli is a species of light brown army ant found in Australia, the only specimen collected in Malanda, Queensland.
