= Aenictus aitkenii =

Scientific classification
- Kingdom: Animalia
- Phylum: Arthropoda
- Clade: Pancrustacea
- Class: Insecta
- Order: Hymenoptera
- Family: Formicidae
- Genus: Aenictus
- Species: A. aitkenii

Binomial name
- Aenictus aitkenii Forel, 1901

Synonyms
- Aenictus aratus asiatica Forel, 1911

Species of ant

Aenictus aitkenii is a species of reddish brown army ant found in India and Sri Lanka.
