= Echeta divisa =

Scientific classification
- Domain: Eukaryota
- Kingdom: Animalia
- Phylum: Arthropoda
- Class: Insecta
- Order: Lepidoptera
- Superfamily: Noctuoidea
- Family: Erebidae
- Subfamily: Arctiinae
- Genus: Echeta
- Species: E. divisa

Binomial name
- Echeta divisa (Herrich-Schäffer, 1855)

Synonyms
- Creatonotus divisus Herrich-Schäffer, [1855]; Automolis marcapata Druce, 1907; Antaxia dichroma Seitz, 1921; Amaxia divisa; Automolis divisus

Species of moth

Echeta divisa is a moth of the family Erebidae. It was described by Gottlieb August Wilhelm Herrich-Schäffer in 1855. It is found in Peru and Colombia.
