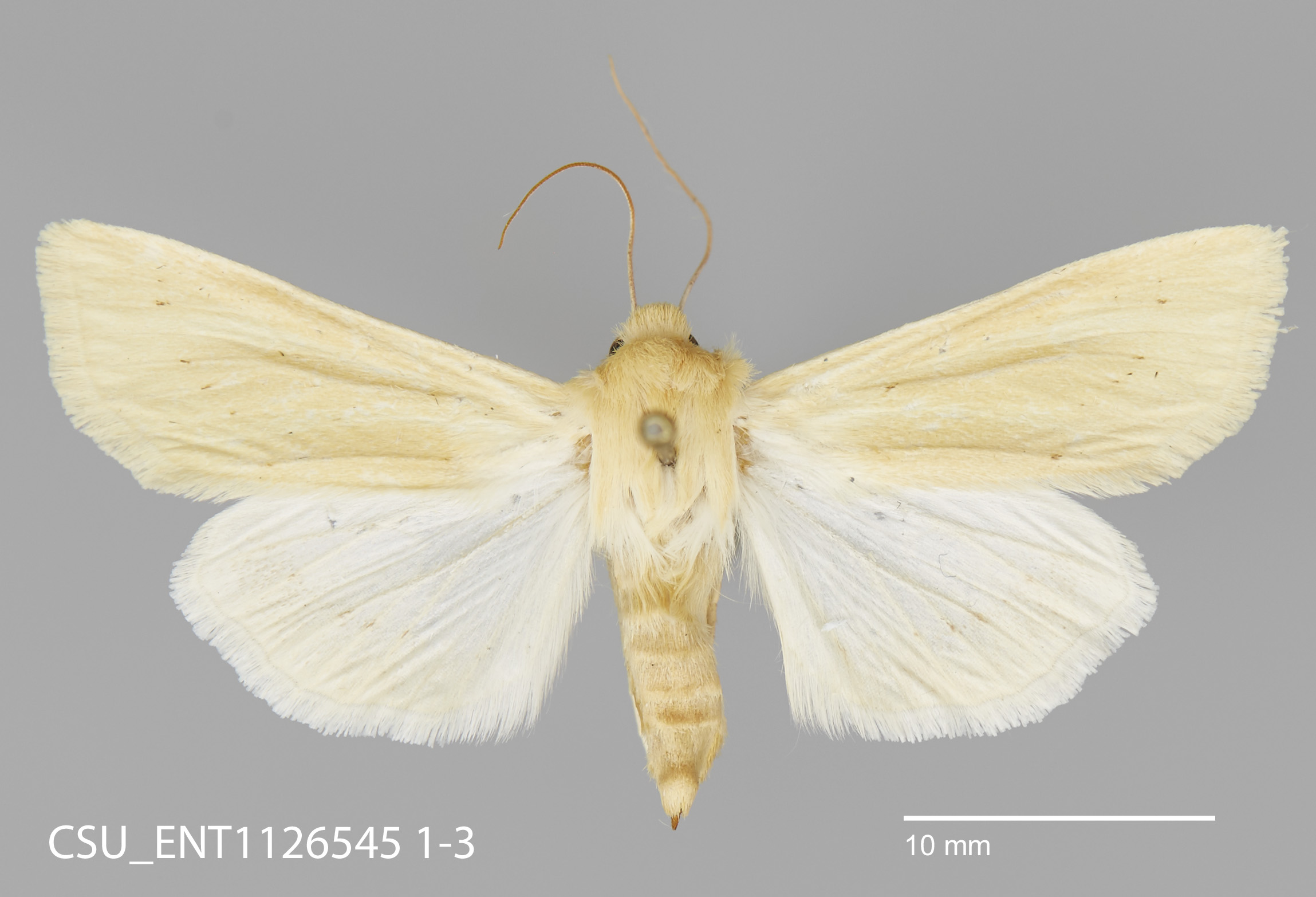

Scientific classification
- Kingdom: Animalia
- Phylum: Arthropoda
- Clade: Pancrustacea
- Class: Insecta
- Order: Lepidoptera
- Superfamily: Noctuoidea
- Family: Noctuidae
- Tribe: Noctuini
- Subtribe: Agrotina
- Genus: Copablepharon
- Species: C. canariana

Binomial name
- Copablepharon canariana McDunnough, 1932

= Copablepharon canariana =

Species of moth

Copablepharon canariana is a species of moth in the family Noctuidae (owlet moths). The species was described by James Halliday McDunnough in 1932. It is found in North America.

The MONA or Hodges number for Copablepharon canariana is 10682.
