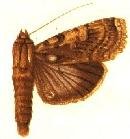

Scientific classification
- Kingdom: Animalia
- Phylum: Arthropoda
- Class: Insecta
- Order: Lepidoptera
- Superfamily: Noctuoidea
- Family: Erebidae
- Genus: Casandria
- Species: C. fosteri

Binomial name
- Casandria fosteri (Hampson, 1913)

= Casandria fosteri =

Species of moth

Casandria fosteri is a moth of the family Erebidae first described by George Hampson in 1913. It is found in South America, including Paraguay.
