= Casandria sinuilinea =

Scientific classification
- Kingdom: Animalia
- Phylum: Arthropoda
- Clade: Pancrustacea
- Class: Insecta
- Order: Lepidoptera
- Superfamily: Noctuoidea
- Family: Erebidae
- Genus: Casandria
- Species: C. sinuilinea

Binomial name
- Casandria sinuilinea (Prout, 1919)

Synonyms
- Acanthodica sinuilinea

Species of moth

Casandria sinuilinea is a moth of the family Erebidae. It is found in Peru.
