= Casandria fassli =

Scientific classification
- Kingdom: Animalia
- Phylum: Arthropoda
- Class: Insecta
- Order: Lepidoptera
- Superfamily: Noctuoidea
- Family: Erebidae
- Genus: Casandria
- Species: C. fassli

Binomial name
- Casandria fassli Zerny, 1916

Species of moth

Casandria fassli is a moth of the family Erebidae. It is found in Bolivia.
