= Echeta pandiona =

Scientific classification
- Domain: Eukaryota
- Kingdom: Animalia
- Phylum: Arthropoda
- Class: Insecta
- Order: Lepidoptera
- Superfamily: Noctuoidea
- Family: Erebidae
- Subfamily: Arctiinae
- Genus: Echeta
- Species: E. pandiona

Binomial name
- Echeta pandiona (Stoll, 1782)

Synonyms
- Phalaena pandiona Stoll, [1782]; Automolis pandiona

Species of moth

Echeta pandiona is a moth of the family Erebidae. It was described by Caspar Stoll in 1782. It is found in Suriname.
