= Casandria penicillum =

Scientific classification
- Kingdom: Animalia
- Phylum: Arthropoda
- Class: Insecta
- Order: Lepidoptera
- Superfamily: Noctuoidea
- Family: Erebidae
- Genus: Casandria
- Species: C. penicillum

Binomial name
- Casandria penicillum Felder & Rogenhofer, 1874

Synonyms
- Acanthodica pamela; Acanthodica penicillum; Agrotis penicillum

Species of moth

Casandria penicillum is a moth of the family Erebidae. It is found in Central and South America, including Guatemala.
