= Echeta juno =

Scientific classification
- Domain: Eukaryota
- Kingdom: Animalia
- Phylum: Arthropoda
- Class: Insecta
- Order: Lepidoptera
- Superfamily: Noctuoidea
- Family: Erebidae
- Subfamily: Arctiinae
- Genus: Echeta
- Species: E. juno

Binomial name
- Echeta juno (Schaus, 1892)

Synonyms
- Scaptius juno Schaus, 1892; Automolis juno

Species of moth

Echeta juno is a moth of the family Erebidae. It was described by William Schaus in 1892. It is found in French Guiana and Brazil.
