= Aenictus mocsaryi =

Scientific classification
- Kingdom: Animalia
- Phylum: Arthropoda
- Clade: Pancrustacea
- Class: Insecta
- Order: Hymenoptera
- Family: Formicidae
- Genus: Aenictus
- Species: A. mocsaryi

Binomial name
- Aenictus mocsaryi Emery, 1901

Species of ant

Aenictus mocsaryi is a species of dark brown army ant found in New Guinea.
