= Aenictus spathifer =

Scientific classification
- Kingdom: Animalia
- Phylum: Arthropoda
- Clade: Pancrustacea
- Class: Insecta
- Order: Hymenoptera
- Family: Formicidae
- Genus: Aenictus
- Species: A. spathifer

Binomial name
- Aenictus spathifer Santschi, 1928

Species of ant

Aenictus spathifer is a species of brown army ant found in Sumatra, Indonesia.
