= Aenictus aratus =

- Aenictus aratus nesiotis worker: a) thorax and pedicel in profile; b) head, dorsal view; c) mandible; d) antenna.

Scientific classification
- Kingdom: Animalia
- Phylum: Arthropoda
- Clade: Pancrustacea
- Class: Insecta
- Order: Hymenoptera
- Family: Formicidae
- Genus: Aenictus
- Species: A. aratus

Binomial name
- Aenictus aratus Forel, 1900

Species of ant

Aenictus aratus is a species of beige and dark brown army ant found in Northern Australia. Parasitic depredation has been observed from Phoridae flies.
