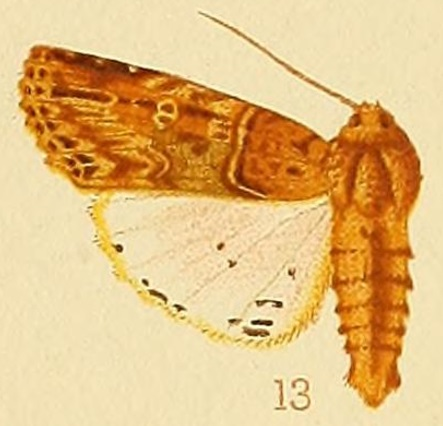

Scientific classification
- Kingdom: Animalia
- Phylum: Arthropoda
- Class: Insecta
- Order: Lepidoptera
- Superfamily: Noctuoidea
- Family: Erebidae
- Genus: Casandria
- Species: C. chiripa

Binomial name
- Casandria chiripa Dognin, 1894

= Casandria chiripa =

Species of moth

Casandria chiripa is a moth of the family Erebidae. It is found in Ecuador.
