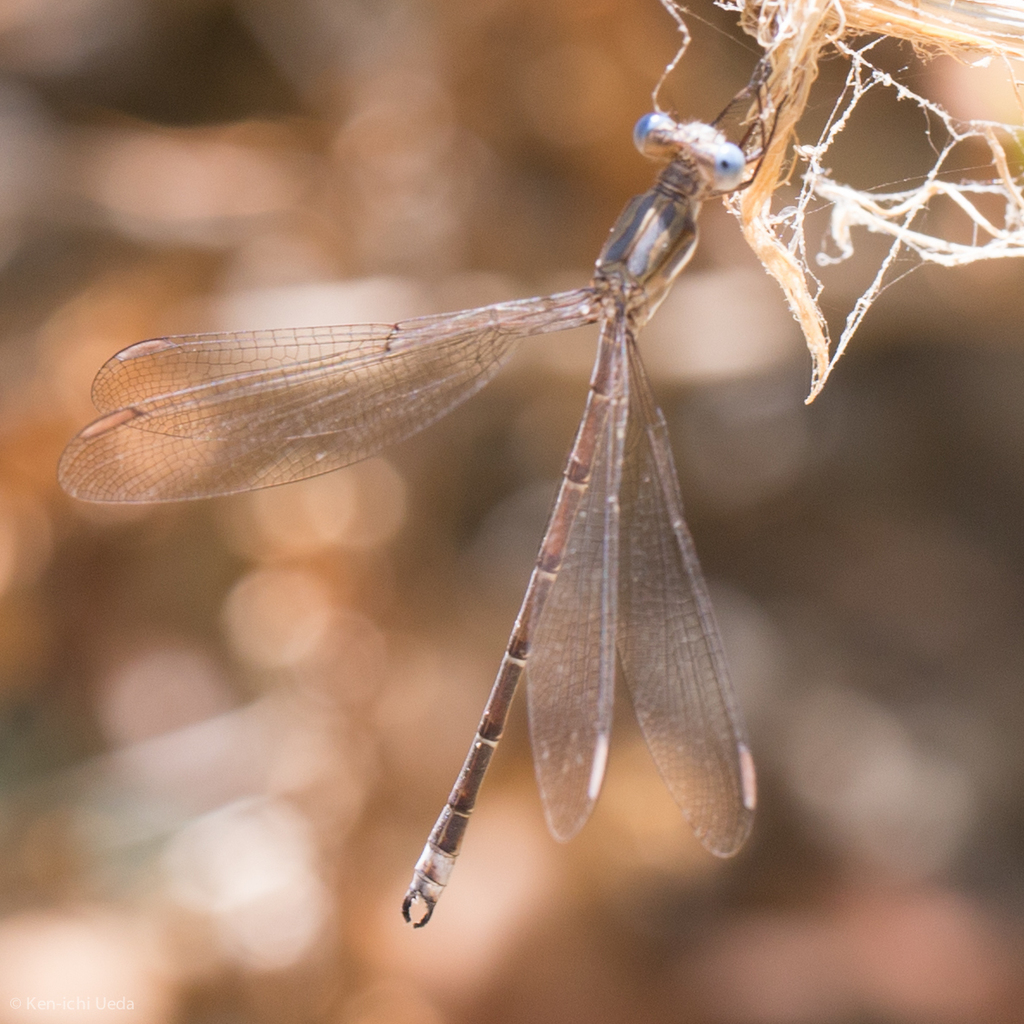

Conservation status
- Least Concern (IUCN 3.1)

Scientific classification
- Kingdom: Animalia
- Phylum: Arthropoda
- Class: Insecta
- Order: Odonata
- Suborder: Zygoptera
- Family: Lestidae
- Genus: Archilestes
- Species: A. californicus

Binomial name
- Archilestes californicus McLachlan, 1895

= Archilestes californicus =

Species of damselfly

Archilestes californicus, the California spreadwing, is a species of spreadwing in the damselfly family Lestidae. It is found in Central America and North America.

The IUCN conservation status of Archilestes californicus is "LC", least concern, with no immediate threat to the species' survival. The population is increasing. The IUCN status was reviewed in 2017.
