= Aenictus arya =

Scientific classification
- Kingdom: Animalia
- Phylum: Arthropoda
- Clade: Pancrustacea
- Class: Insecta
- Order: Hymenoptera
- Family: Formicidae
- Genus: Aenictus
- Species: A. arya

Binomial name
- Aenictus arya Forel, 1901

Species of ant

Aenictus arya is a species of light brown army ant found in India, specifically Karnataka and West Bengal.
