= Archilestes exoletus =

Scientific classification
- Domain: Eukaryota
- Kingdom: Animalia
- Phylum: Arthropoda
- Class: Insecta
- Order: Odonata
- Suborder: Zygoptera
- Family: Lestidae
- Genus: Archilestes
- Species: A. exoletus

Binomial name
- Archilestes exoletus (Hagen in Selys, 1862)

Species of damselfly

Archilestes exoletus is a species of spreadwing in the damselfly family Lestidae. It is found in South America.
