= Adejeania biornata =

Scientific classification
- Domain: Eukaryota
- Kingdom: Animalia
- Phylum: Arthropoda
- Class: Insecta
- Order: Diptera
- Family: Tachinidae
- Genus: Adejeania
- Species: A. biornata

Binomial name
- Adejeania biornata Curran, 1947

Species of fly

Adejeania biornata is a species of parasitic fly in the family Tachinidae, which is found in South America.
