= Aenictus gracilis =

- Aenictus gracilis Emery: a) worker in profile; b) head of same, dorsal view; c) mandible; d) pedicel; e) female, dorsal view, drawn to same scale as worker (a); f) female, in profile; g) head of same, dorsal view; h) tip of abdomen, ventral view, showing hypopygium.

Scientific classification
- Kingdom: Animalia
- Phylum: Arthropoda
- Clade: Pancrustacea
- Class: Insecta
- Order: Hymenoptera
- Family: Formicidae
- Genus: Aenictus
- Species: A. gracilis

Binomial name
- Aenictus gracilis Emery, 1893

Synonyms
- Aenictus martini Forel, 1901; Aenictus martini boelianensis Forel, 1913; Eciton fergusoni elongatus Karavaiev, 1926

Species of ant

Aenictus gracilis is a species of reddish brown army ant found in Borneo, Indonesia, Malaysia, Philippines, Bangladesh, India, Myanmar, and Sri Lanka.
