= Adejeania spiniventris =

Scientific classification
- Domain: Eukaryota
- Kingdom: Animalia
- Phylum: Arthropoda
- Class: Insecta
- Order: Diptera
- Family: Tachinidae
- Genus: Adejeania
- Species: A. spiniventris

Binomial name
- Adejeania spiniventris Guimaraes, 1966

Species of fly

Adejeania spiniventris is a species of parasitic fly in the family Tachinidae. It is found in South America.
