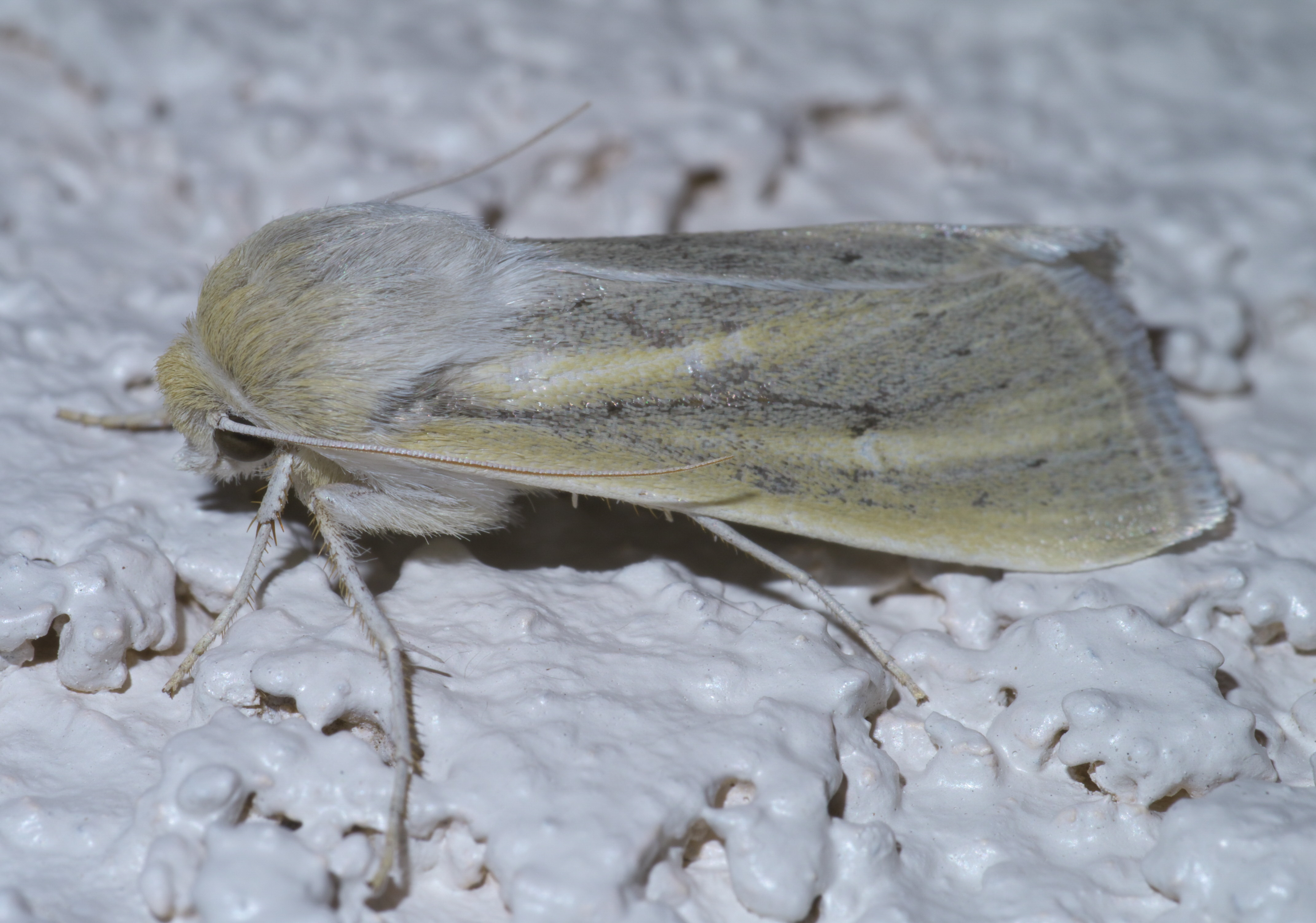
- Copablepharon, Colorado

Scientific classification
- Domain: Eukaryota
- Kingdom: Animalia
- Phylum: Arthropoda
- Class: Insecta
- Order: Lepidoptera
- Superfamily: Noctuoidea
- Family: Noctuidae
- Subtribe: Agrotina
- Genus: Copablepharon; Harvey, 1878

= Copablepharon =

Genus of moths

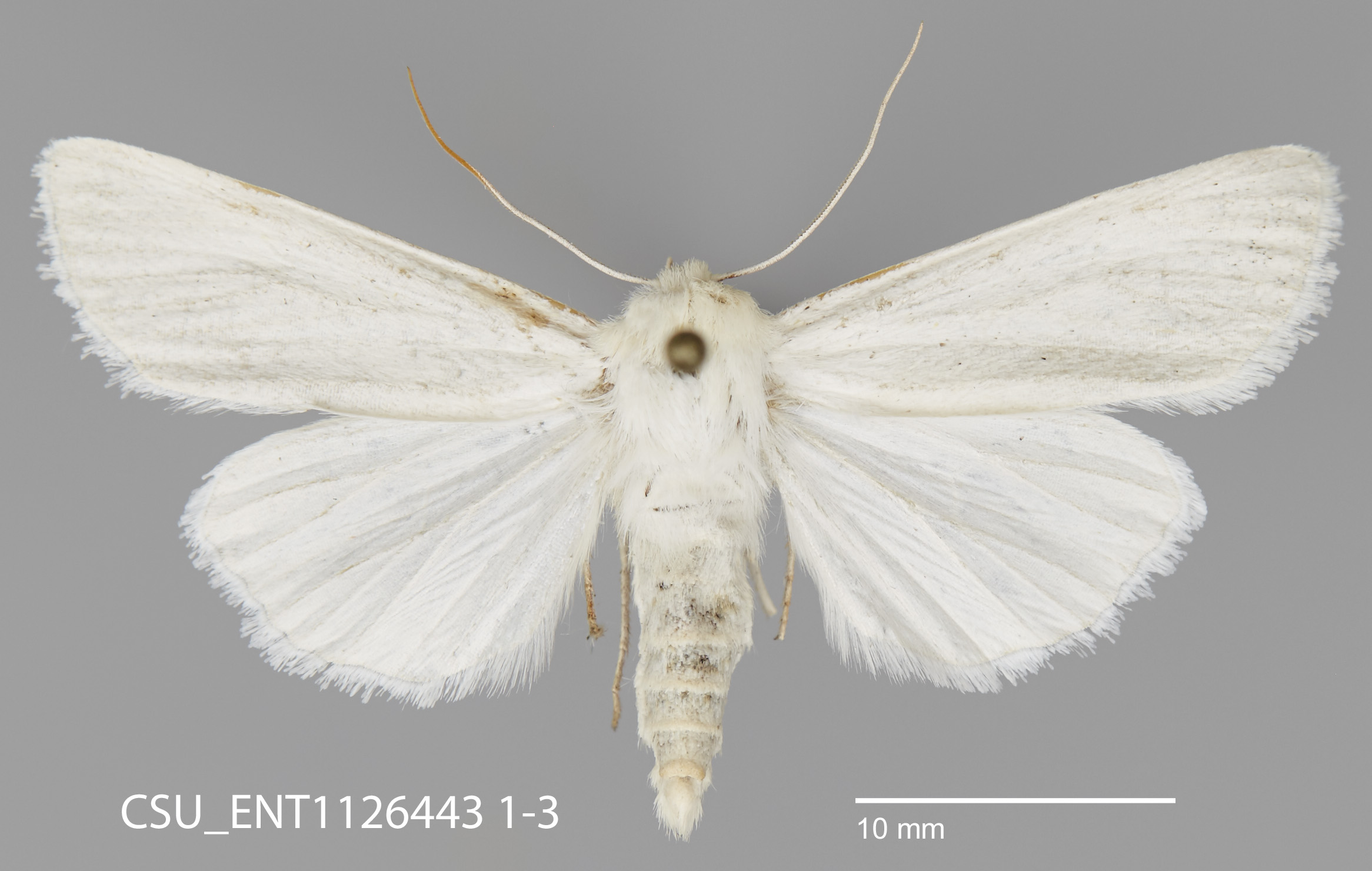
Copablepharon albisericea

Copablepharon is a genus in the moth family Noctuidae. There are more than 20 described species in Copablepharon.

== Species ==
These 24 species belong to the genus Copablepharon:

Copablepharon absidum Harvey, 1875
Copablepharon alaskensis Crabo & Lafontaine, 2004
Copablepharon albisericea Blanchard, 1976
Copablepharon album Harvey, 1876
Copablepharon atrinotum Crabo & Lafontaine, 2004
Copablepharon canariana McDunnough, 1932

Copablepharon canariana canariana
Copablepharon canariana contrasta McDunnough, 1932

Copablepharon columbia Crabo & Lafontaine, 2004
Copablepharon flavum Fauske & Lafontaine, 2004
Copablepharon fuscum Troubridge & Crabo, 1996
Copablepharon gillaspyi Blanchard, 1976
Copablepharon grandis Strecker, 1878
Copablepharon longipenne Grote, 1882

Copablepharon longipenne longipenne
Copablepharon longipenne serraticornis Blanchard, 1976

Copablepharon michiganensis Crabo & Lafontaine, 2004
Copablepharon mustelini Crabo & Lafontaine, 2004
Copablepharon mutans Crabo & Lafontaine, 2004
Copablepharon nevada Crabo & Lafontaine, 2004
Copablepharon opleri Lafontaine, 2004
Copablepharon pictum Fauske & Lafontaine, 2004
Copablepharon robertsoni Crabo & Lafontaine, 2004
Copablepharon sanctaemonicae Dyar, 1904
Copablepharon serrata McDunnough, 1932
Copablepharon serratigrande Lafontaine, 2004
Copablepharon spiritum Crabo & Fauske, 2004

Copablepharon spiritum bicolor Crabo & Fauske, 2004
Copablepharon spiritum lutescens Crabo & Fauske, 2004
Copablepharon spiritum spiritum

Copablepharon viridisparsa Dod, 1916

Copablepharon viridisparsa gilvum Crabo & Lafontaine, 2004
Copablepharon viridisparsa hopfingeri Franclemont, 1954
Copablepharon viridisparsa ravum Crabo & Lafontaine, 2004
Copablepharon viridisparsa viridisparsa
