= Aenictus longi =

Scientific classification
- Kingdom: Animalia
- Phylum: Arthropoda
- Clade: Pancrustacea
- Class: Insecta
- Order: Hymenoptera
- Family: Formicidae
- Genus: Aenictus
- Species: A. longi

Binomial name
- Aenictus longi Forel, 1901

Species of ant

Aenictus longi is a species of tannish beige army ant found in Bangladesh, and India. The species has two subspecies, Aenictus longi longi, and Aenictus longi taivanae.
