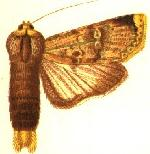

Scientific classification
- Kingdom: Animalia
- Phylum: Arthropoda
- Class: Insecta
- Order: Lepidoptera
- Superfamily: Noctuoidea
- Family: Erebidae
- Genus: Casandria
- Species: C. cabra

Binomial name
- Casandria cabra Dognin, 1894

= Casandria cabra =

Species of moth

Casandria cabra is a moth of the family Erebidae first described by Paul Dognin in 1894. It is found in Ecuador.
