= Aenictus biroi =

Scientific classification
- Kingdom: Animalia
- Phylum: Arthropoda
- Clade: Pancrustacea
- Class: Insecta
- Order: Hymenoptera
- Family: Formicidae
- Genus: Aenictus
- Species: A. biroi

Binomial name
- Aenictus biroi Forel,1907

Species of ant

Aenictus biroi is a species of reddish brown army ant found in Sri Lanka.
