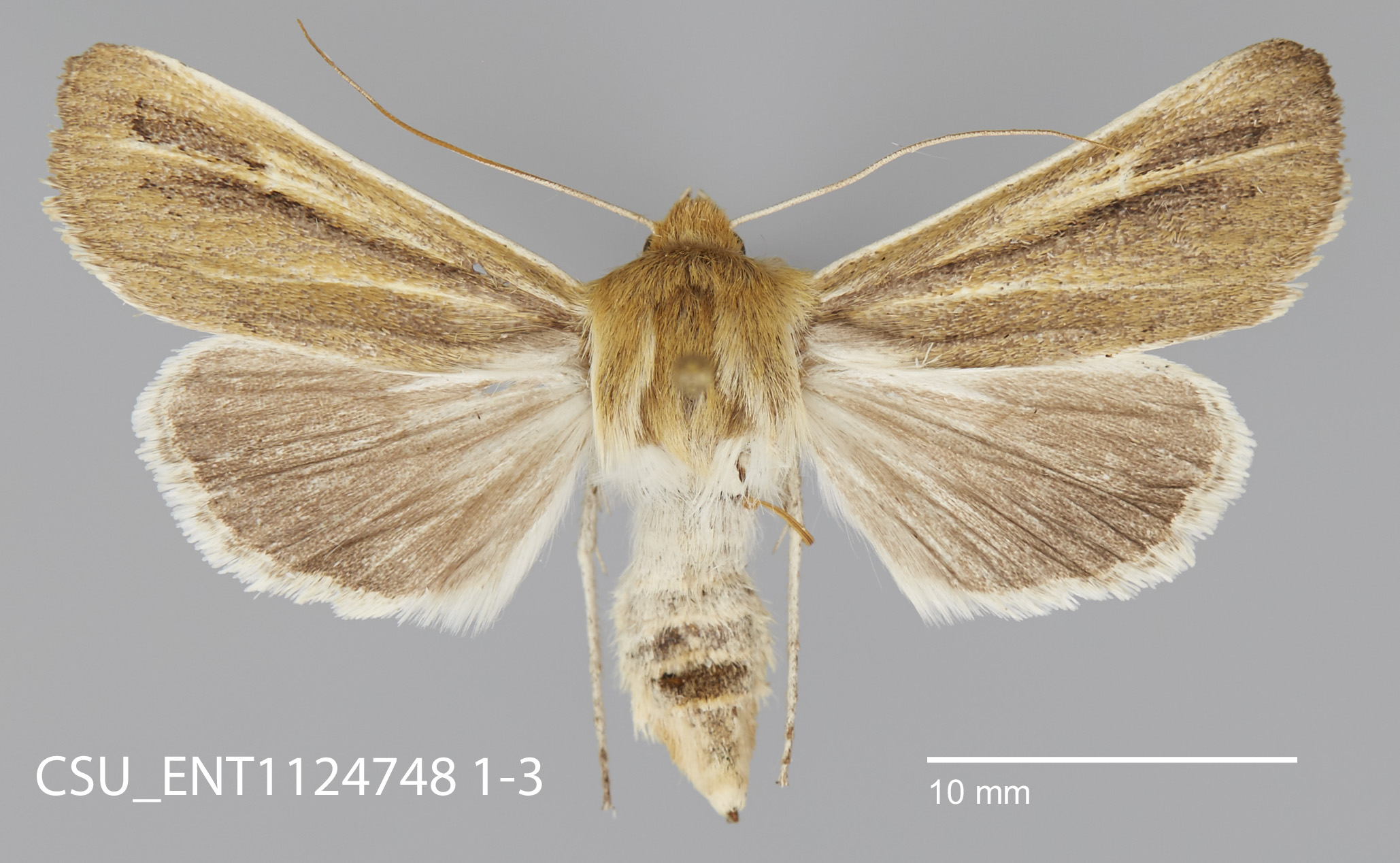

Conservation status
- Critically Imperiled (NatureServe)

Scientific classification
- Kingdom: Animalia
- Phylum: Arthropoda
- Clade: Pancrustacea
- Class: Insecta
- Order: Lepidoptera
- Superfamily: Noctuoidea
- Family: Noctuidae
- Genus: Copablepharon
- Species: C. fuscum

Binomial name
- Copablepharon fuscum Troubridge & Crabo, 1996

= Copablepharon fuscum =

Species of moth

Copablepharon fuscum, the sand-verbena moth, is a moth of the family Noctuidae. It is found on sandy ocean beaches in British Columbia and Washington.

The wingspan is 35–40 mm.

The larvae feed on Abronia latifolia.
