= Aenictus feae =

Scientific classification
- Kingdom: Animalia
- Phylum: Arthropoda
- Clade: Pancrustacea
- Class: Insecta
- Order: Hymenoptera
- Family: Formicidae
- Genus: Aenictus
- Species: A. feae

Binomial name
- Aenictus feae Emery, 1889

Species of ant

Aenictus feae is a species of brown army ant found in Bangladesh, Myanmar, and Yunnan.
