= Aenictus pachycerus =

Scientific classification
- Kingdom: Animalia
- Phylum: Arthropoda
- Clade: Pancrustacea
- Class: Insecta
- Order: Hymenoptera
- Family: Formicidae
- Genus: Aenictus
- Species: A. pachycerus

Binomial name
- Aenictus pachycerus (Smith, F., 1858)

Synonyms
- Aenictus bengalensis continuus Forel, 1901; Typhlatta bengalensis Mayr, 1879

Species of ant

Aenictus pachycerus is a species of reddish brown army ant found in India, and Sri Lanka.
