= Archilestes tuberalatus =

Scientific classification
- Domain: Eukaryota
- Kingdom: Animalia
- Phylum: Arthropoda
- Class: Insecta
- Order: Odonata
- Suborder: Zygoptera
- Family: Lestidae
- Genus: Archilestes
- Species: A. tuberalatus

Binomial name
- Archilestes tuberalatus (Williamson, 1921)

Species of damselfly

Archilestes tuberalatus is a species of spreadwing in the damselfly family Lestidae.
