= Aenictus binghamii =

Scientific classification
- Kingdom: Animalia
- Phylum: Arthropoda
- Clade: Pancrustacea
- Class: Insecta
- Order: Hymenoptera
- Family: Formicidae
- Genus: Aenictus
- Species: A. binghamii

Binomial name
- Aenictus binghamii Forel, 1900

Species of ant

Aenictus binghamii is a species of tiger's eye-colored army ant found in Vietnam, Laos, Myanmar, and Thailand. Colonies have been described in detail in Pak Chong District of Thailand, and Cúc Phương National Park in Vietnam, where a queen was noted in a bivouac at nighttime.
