= Aenictus mauritanicus =

Scientific classification
- Kingdom: Animalia
- Phylum: Arthropoda
- Clade: Pancrustacea
- Class: Insecta
- Order: Hymenoptera
- Family: Formicidae
- Genus: Aenictus
- Species: A. mauritanicus

Binomial name
- Aenictus mauritanicus Santschi, 1910

Species of ant

Aenictus mauritanicus is a species of light brown army ant found in Morocco.
