= Adejeania nigrothoracica =

Scientific classification
- Domain: Eukaryota
- Kingdom: Animalia
- Phylum: Arthropoda
- Class: Insecta
- Order: Diptera
- Family: Tachinidae
- Genus: Adejeania
- Species: A. nigrothoracica

Binomial name
- Adejeania nigrothoracica (Vimmer & Soukup, 1940)

Species of fly

Adejeania nigrothoracica is a species of parasitic fly in the family Tachinidae.
