= Aenictus anceps =

Scientific classification
- Kingdom: Animalia
- Phylum: Arthropoda
- Clade: Pancrustacea
- Class: Insecta
- Order: Hymenoptera
- Family: Formicidae
- Genus: Aenictus
- Species: A. anceps

Binomial name
- Aenictus anceps Forel, 1910

Species of ant

Aenictus anceps is a species of tannish beige army ant found in Eritrea, and Sudan.
