= Aenictus fergusoni =

Scientific classification
- Kingdom: Animalia
- Phylum: Arthropoda
- Clade: Pancrustacea
- Class: Insecta
- Order: Hymenoptera
- Family: Formicidae
- Genus: Aenictus
- Species: A. fergusoni

Binomial name
- Aenictus fergusoni Forel, 1901

Synonyms
- Aenictus fergusoni karawaiewi Wheeler, W.M. & Chapman, 1930; Aenictus fergusoni montanus Forel, 1901; Aenictus fergusoni piltzi Forel, 1901

Species of ant

Aenictus fergusoni is a species of reddish brown army ant found in Bangladesh, India, Myanmar, Nicobar Islands, Thailand, Vietnam, and China.
