= Aenictus asperivalvus =

Scientific classification
- Kingdom: Animalia
- Phylum: Arthropoda
- Clade: Pancrustacea
- Class: Insecta
- Order: Hymenoptera
- Family: Formicidae
- Genus: Aenictus
- Species: A. asperivalvus

Binomial name
- Aenictus asperivalvus Santschi, 1919

Species of ant

Aenictus asperivalvus is a species of light brown army ant found in Cote D'Ivoire.
