= Casandria frigida =

Scientific classification
- Kingdom: Animalia
- Phylum: Arthropoda
- Class: Insecta
- Order: Lepidoptera
- Superfamily: Noctuoidea
- Family: Erebidae
- Genus: Casandria
- Species: C. frigida

Binomial name
- Casandria frigida (E. D. Jones, 1921)

Species of moth

Casandria frigida is a moth of the family Erebidae first described by E. Dukinfield Jones in 1921. It is found in Brazil.
