= Aenictus currax =

Scientific classification
- Kingdom: Animalia
- Phylum: Arthropoda
- Clade: Pancrustacea
- Class: Insecta
- Order: Hymenoptera
- Family: Formicidae
- Genus: Aenictus
- Species: A. currax

Binomial name
- Aenictus currax Emery, 1900

Species of ant

Aenictus currax is a species of dark brown army ant found on New Guinea. A colony of 100,000+ was chronicled on New Guinea in Karema, PNG. The ants form new colonies through fission.
