= Aenictus porizonoides =

Scientific classification
- Kingdom: Animalia
- Phylum: Arthropoda
- Clade: Pancrustacea
- Class: Insecta
- Order: Hymenoptera
- Family: Formicidae
- Genus: Aenictus
- Species: A. porizonoides

Binomial name
- Aenictus porizonoides Walker, 1860

Synonyms
- Aenictus greeni Bingham, 1903

Species of ant

Aenictus porizonoides is a species of reddish brown army ant found in Sri Lanka.
