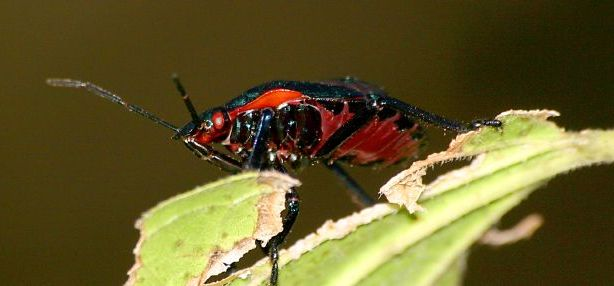
- Ventral view

Scientific classification
- Kingdom: Animalia
- Phylum: Arthropoda
- Clade: Pancrustacea
- Class: Insecta
- Order: Hemiptera
- Suborder: Heteroptera
- Family: Pentatomidae
- Genus: Alcaeorrhynchus
- Species: A. grandis

Binomial name
- Alcaeorrhynchus grandis (Dallas, 1851)

= Alcaeorrhynchus grandis =

Species of true bug

Alcaeorrhynchus grandis is a species of the family Pentatomidae. Also known as giant strong-nosed stink bug, Alcaeorrhynchus grandis can be found through Brazil, Colombia, Mexico, and the southern United States. As a predator, this stink bug can follow frass trails created by prey.
