= Protodejeania =

Scientific classification
- Kingdom: Animalia
- Phylum: Arthropoda
- Class: Insecta
- Order: Diptera
- Family: Tachinidae
- Subfamily: Tachininae
- Tribe: Tachinini
- Genus: Protodejeania; Townsend, 1915

Type species
- Dejeania hystricosa Williston, 1886

Genus of flies

Protodejeania is a genus of flies in the family Tachinidae.

== Species ==
- Protodejeania dichroma (Wulp, 1888)
- Protodejeania downsi Curran, 1947
- Protodejeania echinata (Thomson, 1869)
- Protodejeania hystricosa (Williston, 1886)
- Protodejeania major Curran, 1947
- Protodejeania montana (Wulp, 1891)
- Protodejeania pachecoi Curran, 1947
