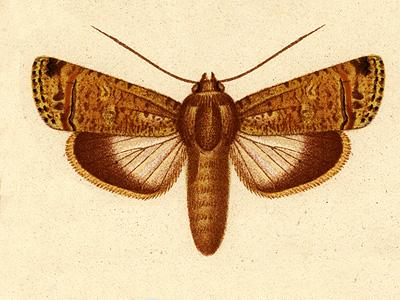

Scientific classification
- Kingdom: Animalia
- Phylum: Arthropoda
- Class: Insecta
- Order: Lepidoptera
- Superfamily: Noctuoidea
- Family: Erebidae
- Genus: Casandria
- Species: C. emittens

Binomial name
- Casandria emittens Walker, 1857

Synonyms
- Acanthodica emittens Walker, 1857; Agrotis emittens Walker, 1857

= Casandria emittens =

Species of moth

Casandria emittens is a moth in the family Erebidae. It can be found in the Dominican Republic and Mexico.
