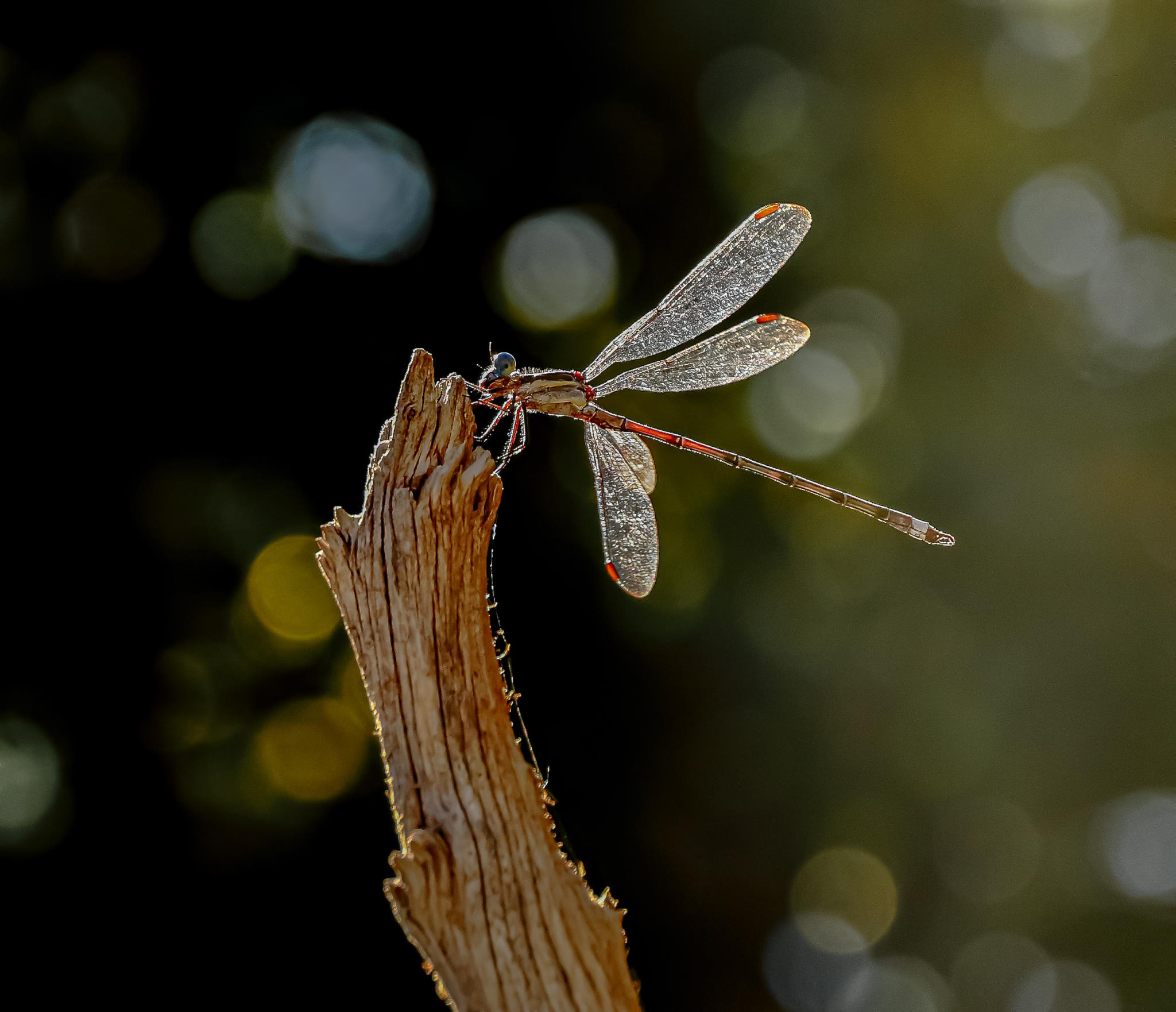
- Photographed at the Denver Botanic Gardens

Scientific classification
- Kingdom: Animalia
- Phylum: Arthropoda
- Clade: Pancrustacea
- Class: Insecta
- Order: Odonata
- Suborder: Zygoptera
- Family: Lestidae
- Genus: Archilestes
- Species: A. grandis

Binomial name
- Archilestes grandis (Rambur, 1842)

= Great spreadwing =

Species of damselfly

The great spreadwing (Archilestes grandis) is a damselfly in the family Lestidae. When great spreadwings are startled they often return to the same perch or a perch nearby.

== Characteristics ==
The great spreadwing is one of the largest North American spreadwings, with a length of 2-2.4 inches and a wingspan of 3 inches. The thorax of the male is dull greenish bronze above it is a broad diagonal yellow stripe on sides. It is also the only species with a broad yellow racing stripe on the sides of thorax. The abdomen is dark with a blue-gray tip. Its eyes and face are blue. Females are similar to males but are more brown on the body. Her eyes are more of a paler blue than the male. The yellow stripe also occurs on the female great spreadwing. When females are laying eggs they may appear in a putty-color. It is much the same color as the withered leaves in which they lay eggs.

== Distribution ==
The great spreadwing is found in western and southern North America. It is more common in western United States than in the eastern. The great spreadwing can also be found in Central America and northern South America. In the 1920s and later Archilestes grandis has recently expanded its range in North America to the east and north.

== Habitat ==
The great spreadwing prefers slow small streams, often with alder or willows, wetlands, ponds and temporary pools. It breeds readily in heavily vegetated water gardens with unpolluted water, as well as in natural water. Females will oviposit in vegetation such as water iris while clasped by males. The male great spreadwings hanging from vegetation either over or near water, usually fairly low, like under 2 feet. On an occasion the nymphs can be spotted in winter, basking in sunwarmed shallow water alongside tadpoles. They are recognizable by their Y tails which are actually their gills.

== Flight season ==
This species is most active from April–December. The timing varies with temperature.

== Life cycle ==
When great spreadwings are mating and after collection of sperm, the female cuts a slit in emergent vegetation and oviposits in it. Then nymphs develop underwater until they climb out, ready to emerge as adults. Like other Odonates, emergence usually occurs under the cover of darkness.
