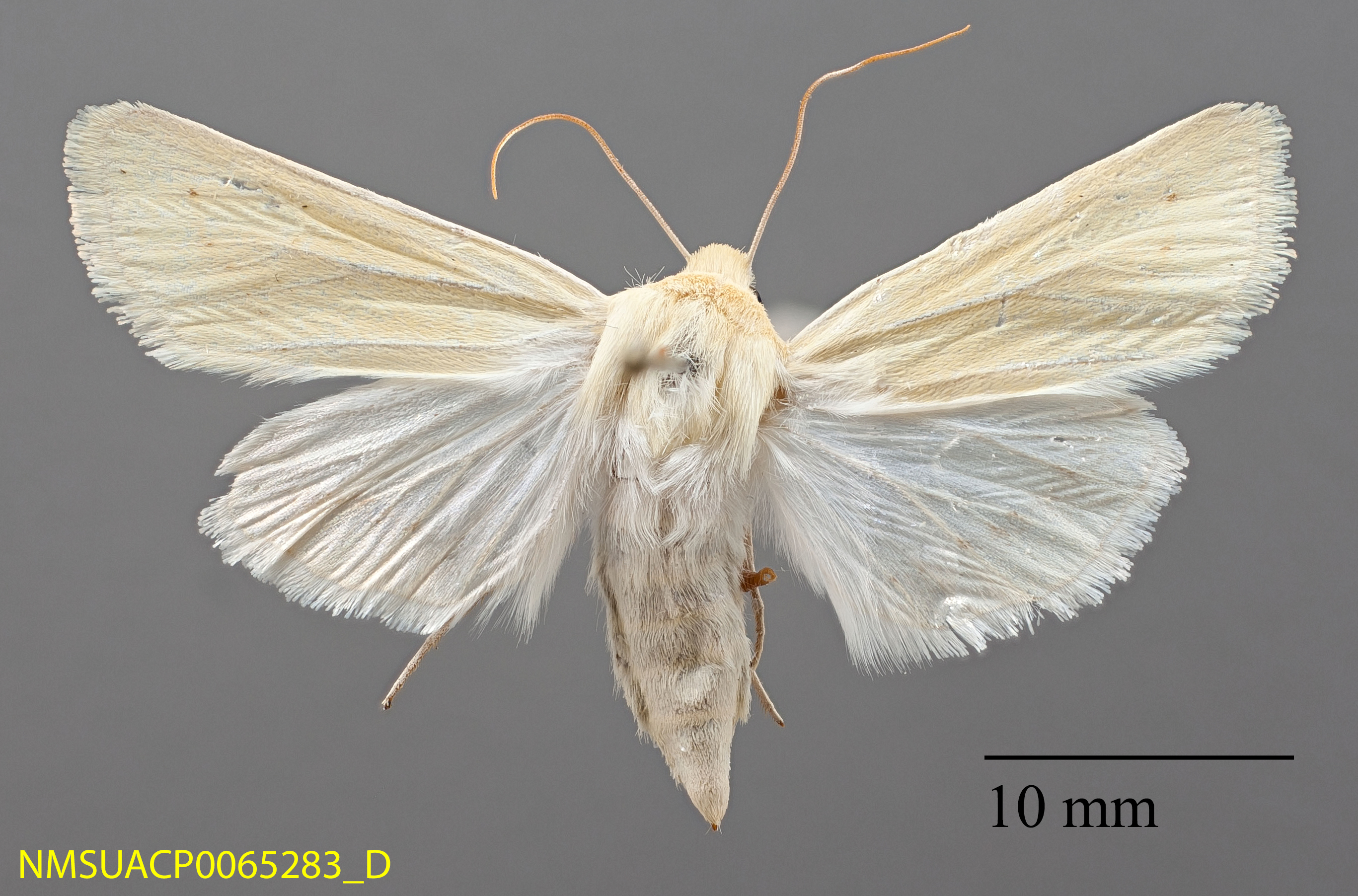

Scientific classification
- Domain: Eukaryota
- Kingdom: Animalia
- Phylum: Arthropoda
- Class: Insecta
- Order: Lepidoptera
- Superfamily: Noctuoidea
- Family: Noctuidae
- Genus: Copablepharon
- Species: C. grandis

Binomial name
- Copablepharon grandis (Strecker, 1878)

Synonyms
- Aedophron grandis Strecker, 1877; Copablepharon grande (Strecker, 1878); Copablepharon subflavidens Grote, 1882

= Copablepharon grandis =

Species of moth

Copablepharon grandis, the pale yellow dune moth, is a moth of the family Noctuidae. The species was first described by Strecker in 1878. It is found in North America from southern Alberta east to south-western Manitoba, the eastern parts of South Dakota, North Dakota and Iowa, west to California and south to southern Arizona, New Mexico and western Texas.

The wingspan is 38–41 mm. Adults are on wing from July to August depending on the location. There is one generation per year.
