= Casandria =

Scientific classification
- Kingdom: Animalia
- Phylum: Arthropoda
- Clade: Pancrustacea
- Class: Insecta
- Order: Lepidoptera
- Superfamily: Noctuoidea
- Family: Erebidae
- Subfamily: Erebinae
- Genus: Casandria; Walker, 1857

Synonyms
- Acanthodica Schaus, 1894

Genus of moths

Casandria is A moth genus of the family Erebidae. It originally was a monotypic genus in Noctuidae containing one species, Casandria emittens,with both the genus and species described by Francis Walker in 1857 from a specimen in Jamaica. The taxonomic position of the genus was reevaluated and placed into in family Erebidae and merged with the genus Acanthodica.

== Species ==
- Casandria albiplena (L.B. Prout, 1919)
- Casandria cabra (Dognin, 1894)
- Casandria chiripa (Dognin, 1894)
- Casandria coelebs (L.B. Prout, 1919)
- Casandria daunus (Druce)
- Casandria drucei (Dognin, 1889)
- Casandria emittens Walker, 1857
- Casandria fassli (Zerny, 1916)
- Casandria fosteri (Hampson, 1913)
- Casandria frigida (Jones, 1921)
- Casandria grandis (Schaus, 1894)
- Casandria hages (Druce, 1900)
- Casandria lignaris (Schaus, 1894)
- Casandria penicillum (Felder & Rogenhofer, 1874)
- Casandria sinuilinea (L. B. Prout, 1919)
- Casandria splendens (Druce, 1889)
- Casandria xylinoides (Schaus, 1894)
