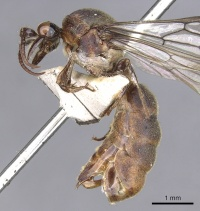

Scientific classification
- Kingdom: Animalia
- Phylum: Arthropoda
- Clade: Pancrustacea
- Class: Insecta
- Order: Hymenoptera
- Family: Formicidae
- Genus: Aenictus
- Species: A. grandis

Binomial name
- Aenictus grandis Bingham, 1903

= Aenictus grandis =

Species of ant

Aenictus grandis is a species of dark brown army ant found in Bangladesh, Myanmar, and Yunnan.
