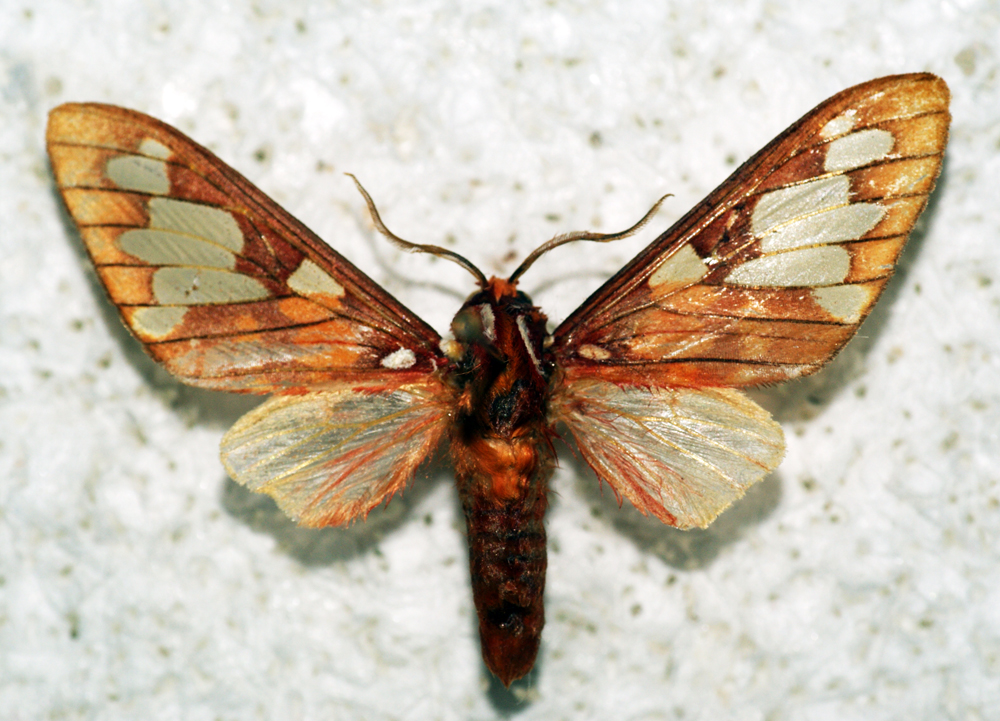

Scientific classification
- Domain: Eukaryota
- Kingdom: Animalia
- Phylum: Arthropoda
- Class: Insecta
- Order: Lepidoptera
- Superfamily: Noctuoidea
- Family: Erebidae
- Subfamily: Arctiinae
- Genus: Echeta
- Species: E. grandis

Binomial name
- Echeta grandis (H. Druce, 1883)

Synonyms
- Zatrephes grandis H. Druce, 1883; Automolis grandis

= Echeta grandis =

Species of moth

Echeta grandis is a moth of the family Erebidae. It was described by Herbert Druce in 1883. It is found in Ecuador.
