= Californiae =

Californiae can refer to:

- The Californias
- Archytas californiae
- Stenopogon californiae
- Psilochorus californiae
- Leptarctia californiae
- Glyphipterix californiae
- Lampropeltis californiae
