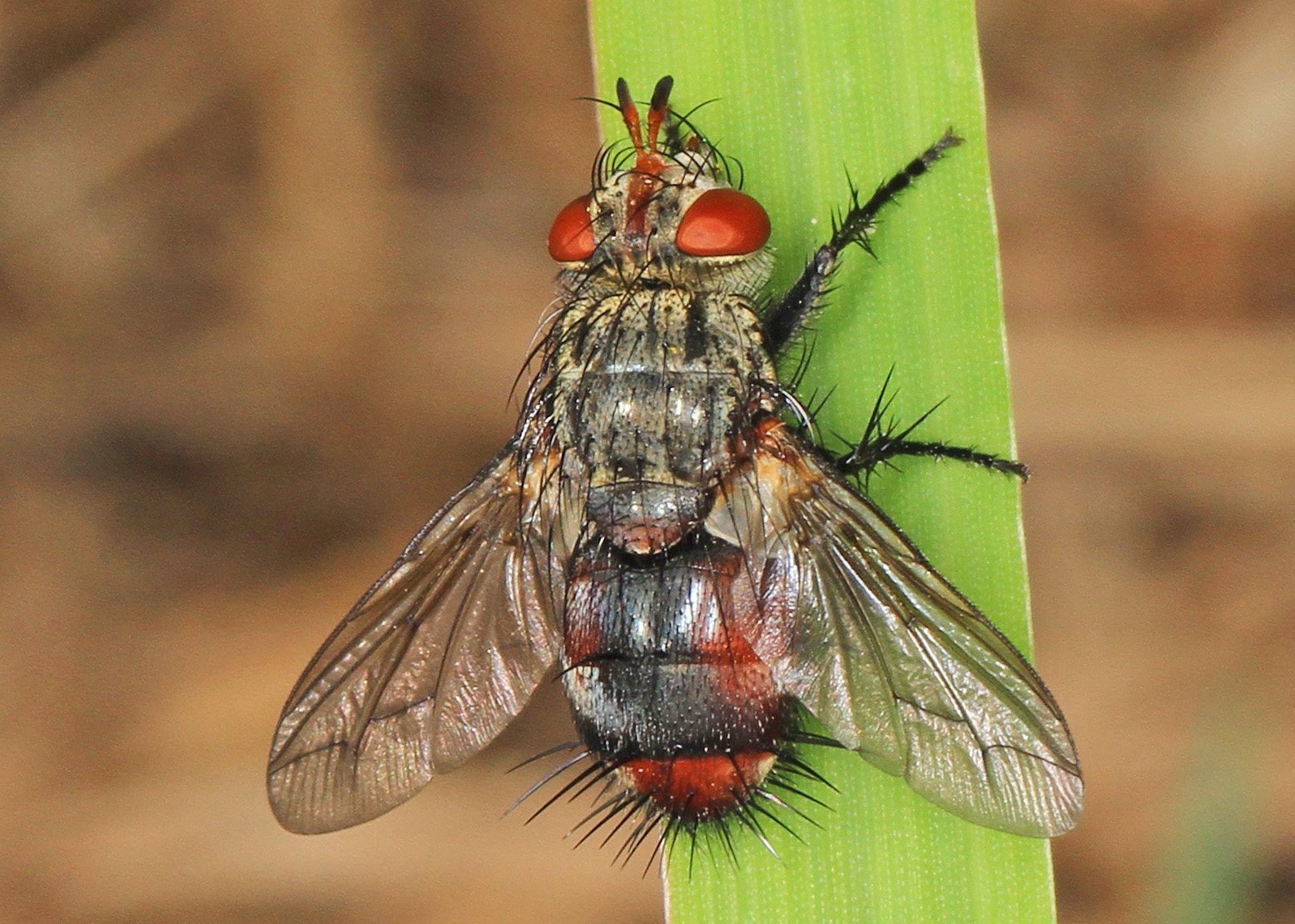
- Archytas rufiventris

Scientific classification
- Kingdom: Animalia
- Phylum: Arthropoda
- Class: Insecta
- Order: Diptera
- Family: Tachinidae
- Subfamily: Tachininae
- Tribe: Tachinini
- Genus: Archytas; Jaennicke, 1867

Type species
- Archytas bicolor Jaennicke, 1867

Synonyms
- Tachinodes Bergenstamm, 1889; Parafabricia Bergenstamm, 1894; Eufabricia Townsend, 1908; Makasinocera Townsend, 1915; Neoarchytas Townsend, 1915; Pseudoarchytopsis Townsend, 1927; Proarchytas Townsend, 1931; Makasinocerops Townsend, 1935; Itarchytas E.E. Blanchard, 1940; Archynemochaeta E.E. Blanchard, 1941; Archytodejeania E.E. Blanchard, 1941; Proarchytoides E.E. Blanchard, 1941

= Archytas (fly) =

Genus of flies

Archytas is a genus of flies in the family Tachinidae.

== Species ==
Subgenus Archytas Jaennicke, 1867

- Archytas analis (Fabricius, 1805)
- Archytas apicifer (Walker, 1849)
- Archytas basifulvus (Walker, 1849)
- Archytas bruchi (Blanchard, 1941)
- Archytas californiae (Walker, 1853)
- Archytas cirphis Curran, 1927
- Archytas daemon (Wiedemann, 1830)
- Archytas diaphanus (Fabricius, 1805)
- Archytas divisus (Walker, 1853)
- Archytas dux Curran, 1928
- Archytas frenguellii (Blanchard, 1941)
- Archytas giacomellii (Blanchard, 1941)
- Archytas inambaricus (Townsend, 1915)
- Archytas lobulatus Curran, 1928
- Archytas marmoratus (Townsend, 1915)
- Archytas misionensis (Blanchard, 1941)
- Archytas nivalis Curran, 1928
- Archytas nonamensis Ravlin, 1984
- Archytas palliatus Curran, 1928
- Archytas peruanus Curran, 1928
- Archytas productus Curran, 1928
- Archytas prudens Curran, 1928
- Archytas pseudodaemon (Blanchard, 1940)
- Archytas rufiventris Curran, 1928
- Archytas shannoni Guimarães, 1960
- Archytas thompsoni Guimarães, 1973
- Archytas wagneri (Blanchard, 1941)

Subgenus Nemochaeta Wulp, 1888

- Archytas aberrans (Giglio-Tos, 1893)
- Archytas aterrima (Robineau-Desvoidy, 1830)
- Archytas australis (Macquart, 1855)
- Archytas convexiforceps Brooks, 1949
- Archytas crucius (Giglio-Tos, 1893)
- Archytas dissimilis (Wulp, 1888)
- Archytas frontalis Wulp, 1892
- Archytas infuscatus (Wulp, 1892)
- Archytas instabilis Curran, 1928
- Archytas intritus (Walker, 1861)
- Archytas jurinoides (Giglio-Tos, 1893)
- Archytas lateralis (Macquart, 1844)
- Archytas metallicus (Robineau-Desvoidy, 1830)
- Archytas nitidus (Wulp, 1892)
- Archytas pernox (Giglio-Tos, 1893)

Unplaced to subgenus

- Archytas albiceps (Walker, 1860)
- Archytas amethystinus (Macquart, 1844)
- Archytas angrensis Guimarães, 1963
- Archytas araujoi Guimarães, 1963
- Archytas arnaudi Guimarães, 1963
- Archytas aurifrons (Townsend, 1917)
- Archytas bennetti Thompson, 1963
- Archytas biezankoi Guimarães, 1961
- Archytas caroniensis Thompson, 1963
- Archytas carrerai Guimarães, 1961
- Archytas damippus (Walker, 1849)
- Archytas dissimiloides Thompson, 1963
- Archytas duckei Guimarães, 1961
- Archytas flavifacies (Macquart, 1851)
- Archytas flavifrons (Jaennicke, 1867)
- Archytas fulviventris (Robineau-Desvoidy, 1830)
- Archytas goncalvesi Guimarães, 1963
- Archytas hiemalis Thompson, 1963
- Archytas incertus (Macquart, 1851)
- Archytas infumatus (Bigot, 1887)
- Archytas lanei Guimarães, 1961
- Archytas lenkoi Guimarães, 1961
- Archytas leschenaldi (Robineau-Desvoidy, 1830)
- Archytas lopesi Guimarães, 1961
- Archytas neptilucus (Wulp, 1892)
- Archytas nigrocalyptratus (Macquart, 1846)
- Archytas pearsoni Guimarães, 1963
- Archytas perplexa (Townsend, 1931)
- Archytas piarconensis Thompson, 1963
- Archytas pilifrons (Schiner, 1868)
- Archytas pilosus (Walker, 1853)
- Archytas platonicus Cortés & Campos, 1971
- Archytas purseglovei Thompson, 1963
- Archytas russatus Reinhard, 1962
- Archytas sabroskyi Guimarães, 1963
- Archytas sanctaecrucis Thompson, 1963
- Archytas scutellatus (Macquart, 1844)
- Archytas seabrai Guimarães, 1961
- Archytas seminiger (Wiedemann, 1830)
- Archytas setifacies Curran, 1928
- Archytas sibillans Curran, 1928
- Archytas smaragdinus (Macquart, 1844)
- Archytas townsendi Curran, 1928
- Archytas translucens (Macquart, 1846)
- Archytas travassosi Guimarães, 1961
- Archytas trinitatis Thompson, 1963
- Archytas unguis (Townsend, 1915)
- Archytas varicornis Curran, 1928
- Archytas vernalis Curran, 1928
- Archytas vexor Curran, 1928
- Archytas willistoni Curran, 1925
- Archytas zikani Guimarães, 1961
