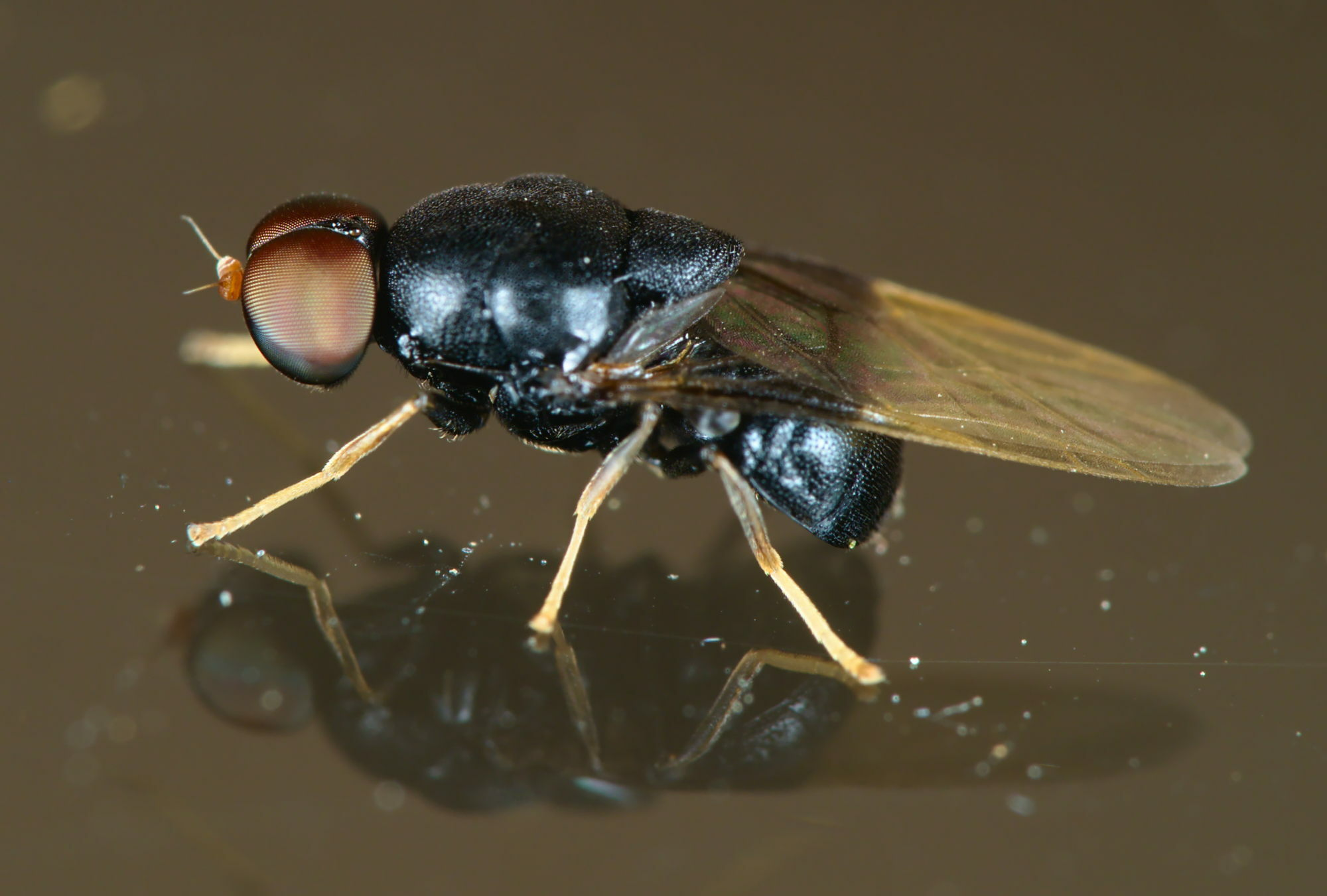
- Eupachygaster tarsalis

Scientific classification
- Kingdom: Animalia
- Phylum: Arthropoda
- Clade: Pancrustacea
- Class: Insecta
- Order: Diptera
- Family: Stratiomyidae
- Subfamily: Pachygastrinae
- Genus: Eupachygaster
- Species: E. tarsalis

Binomial name
- Eupachygaster tarsalis (Zetterstedt, 1842)

Synonyms
- Pachygaster tarsalis Zetterstedt, 1842; Pachygaster robustus Jaennicke, 1866

= Eupachygaster tarsalis =

Species of fly

Eupachygaster tarsalis, the sarce black, is a European and Palearctic. species of soldier fly.

== Description ==
Wings: basal half slightly darkened, veins yellowish in the apical half. Wing vein R4 present’ Black body, finely wrinkled. Head slightly swollen in front. Brown antennae (male) sometimes orange (female). Antennae inserted below the middle of the head height. Eyes united or close together (male), separated (female). Eyes with uneven facets, large facets clearly separated from small ones. Scutellum about as long as wide, adorned with numerous marginal apical spinules. . Brown halteres Femurs dark brown; tibias and tarsi yellow. - Length 3 mm.

== Distribution ==
Austria, Azerbaijan, Belgium, Bulgaria, Czech Republic, Denmark, England, France, Germany, Hungary, Poland, Romania, Russia, Slovakia, Sweden, Switzerland, Turkmenistan, Yugoslavia.
