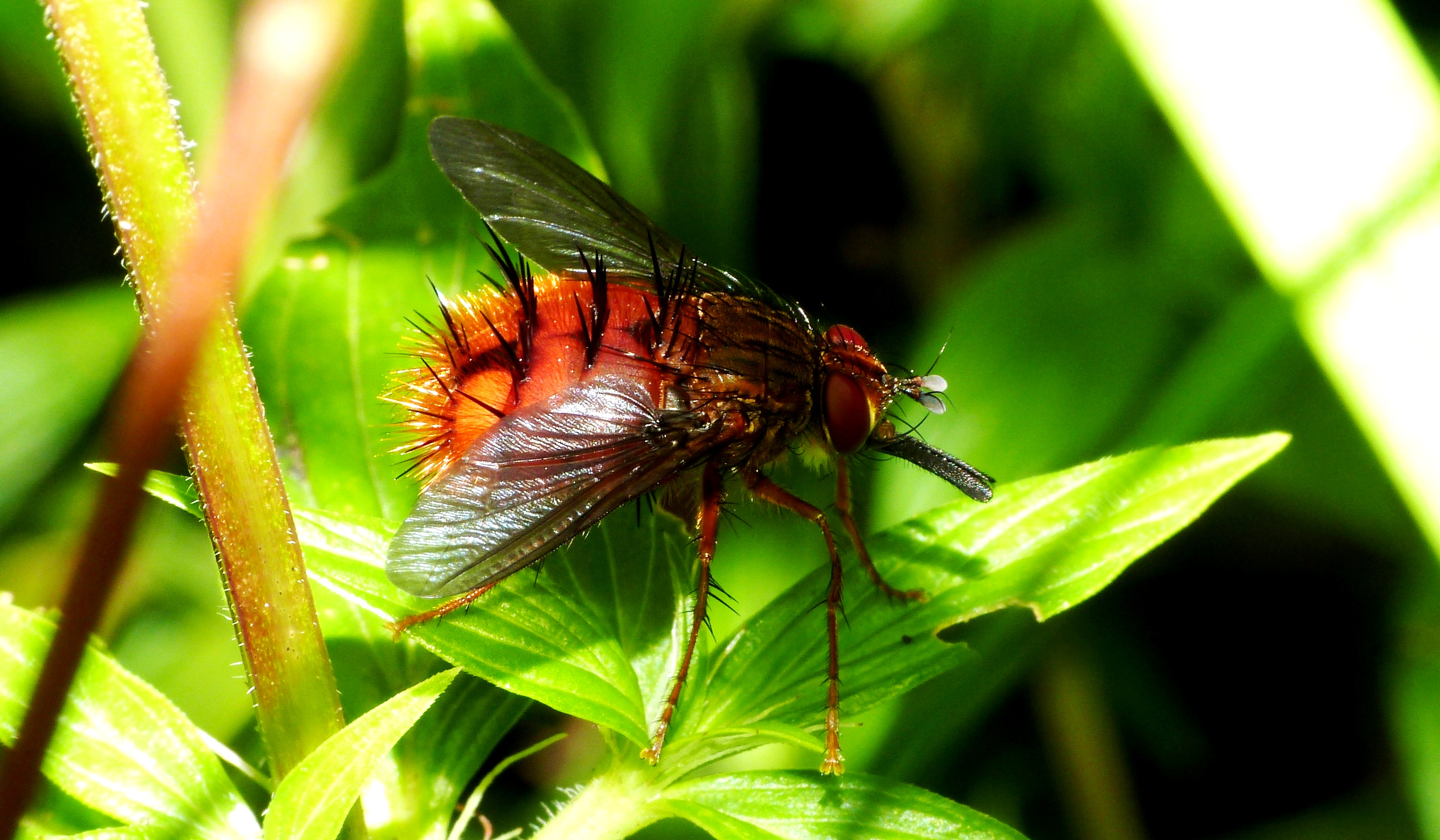
- Paradejeania rutilioides

Scientific classification
- Kingdom: Animalia
- Phylum: Arthropoda
- Class: Insecta
- Order: Diptera
- Family: Tachinidae
- Subfamily: Tachininae
- Tribe: Tachinini
- Genus: Paradejeania; Brauer & von Bergenstamm, 1893

Type species
- Dejeania rutilioides Jaennicke, 1867

= Paradejeania =

Genus of flies

Paradejeania is a genus of flies in the family Tachinidae.

== Species ==
- Paradejeania colombiensis Arnaud, 1951
- Paradejeania nigrescens Arnaud, 1951
- Paradejeania rutilioides (Jaennicke, 1867)
- Paradejeania xenisma Woodley, 1993
