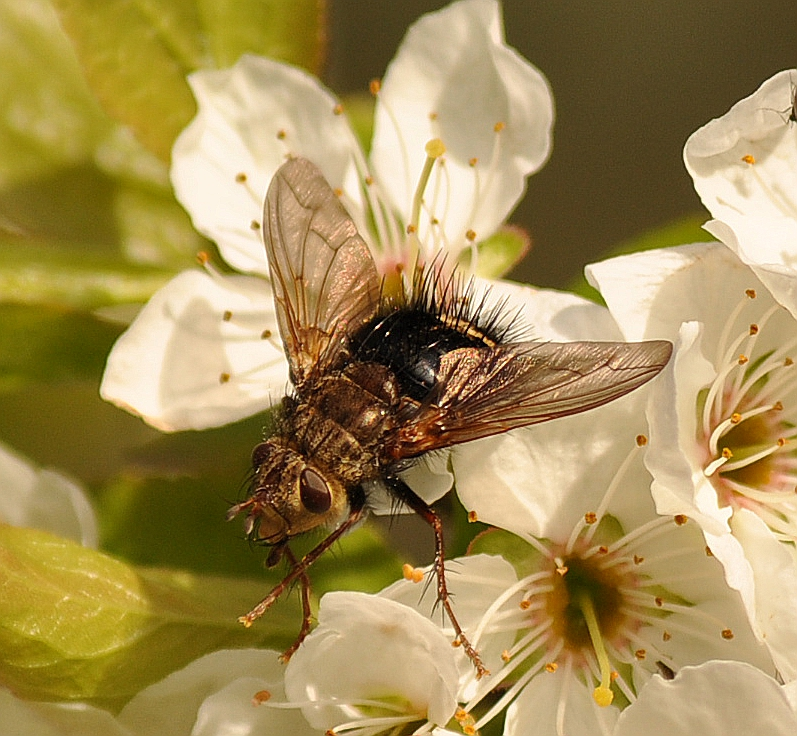
- Archytas sp. resting on flowers.

Scientific classification
- Kingdom: Animalia
- Phylum: Arthropoda
- Class: Insecta
- Order: Diptera
- Family: Tachinidae
- Subfamily: Tachininae
- Tribe: Tachinini
- Genus: Archytas
- Species: A. apicifer

Binomial name
- Archytas apicifer (Walker, 1849)

Synonyms
- Tachina apicifer Walker, 1849; Archytas vulgaris Curran, 1928

= Archytas apicifer =

Species of fly

Archytas apicifer is a medium to large sized (approximately 10-15 mm) Nearctic tachinid fly. The species name was authored by the German entomologist Johann Friedrich Jaennicke (1867) and presumably named after the Greek classical philosopher and mathematician Archytas. The larvae are parasites of several caterpillar species.

== Behavior and morphology ==
The family Tachinidae is considered the second-largest in terms of number of species among all the diverse families of Diptera (two-winged true flies). There are about 10,000 species worldwide. Many tachinid flies are economically important parasites of other arthropods. Several genera are robust and brightly patterned and many possess conspicuous bristles on the head or on the 4th to 6th abdominal segments.

== Diet ==
Archytas apicifer adults feed on flower nectar, and are also known to be pollinators of some flowers. Like many other tachinid flies, A. apicifer larvae are internal parasitoids of the Forest tent caterpillars and fall webworms in addition to the tomato fruitworm, corn earworm, and cutworms.

== Distribution ==
Canada, United States, Dominican Republic, Saint Vincent, El Salvador, Mexico, Colombia, Ecuador.
