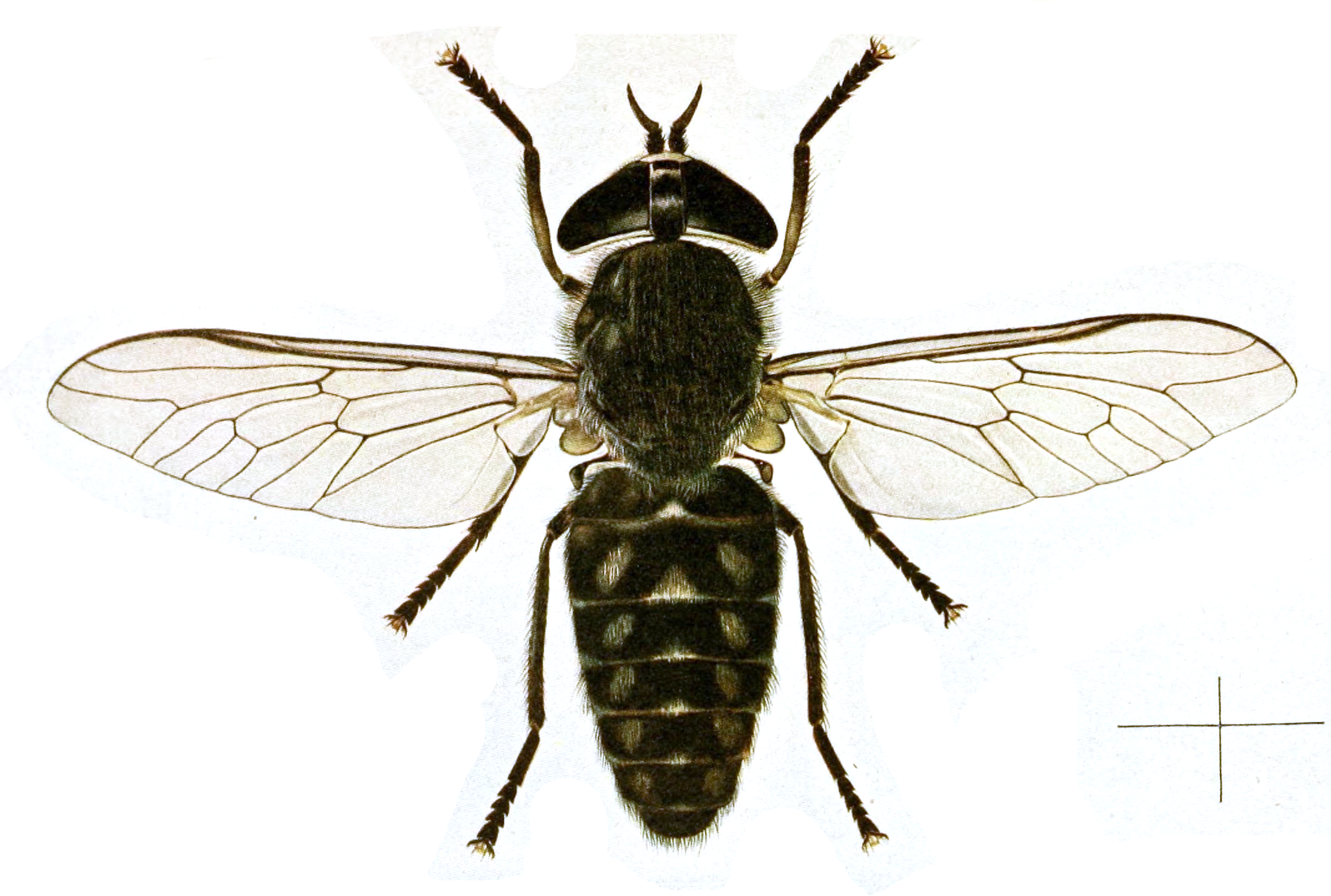
- Tabanus cordiger female

Scientific classification
- Kingdom: Animalia
- Phylum: Arthropoda
- Clade: Pancrustacea
- Class: Insecta
- Order: Diptera
- Family: Tabanidae
- Subfamily: Tabaninae
- Tribe: Tabanini
- Genus: Tabanus
- Species: T. cordiger

Binomial name
- Tabanus cordiger Meigen, 1820

Synonyms
- Tabanus atricornis Meigen, 1835; Tabanus braueri Jaennicke, 1866; Tabanus fortunatus Frey, 1936; Tabanus latifrons Zetterstedt, 1842; Tabanus megacephalus Jaennicke, 1866; Tabanus vicinus Egger, 1859

= Tabanus cordiger =

Species of fly

Tabanus cordiger also known as the plain-eyed grey horsefly is a species of biting horse-fly.

== Description ==
Diagnostic characters include: Abdomen: dorsal side with a lateral line of light spots placed between the midline and the lateral edge of the tergites, so that on the black background you can see five light longitudinal lines: one median, two lateral, and two marginal, separated from each other by four black lines . Antennae: third segment with a blunt or short tooth. Wing: hyaline costal cell. Eyes without colour bands. Male: back of the eye area widely exposed, especially near the ocellar tubercle, bristling with a fringe of long hairs. Palps: second segment swollen. Female: back of the eye area slightly wider; back of the eye area slightly wider; space between the eyes 3.5 times longer than wide in front; middle plate bare, isolated. -- Length 12-17 mm.
