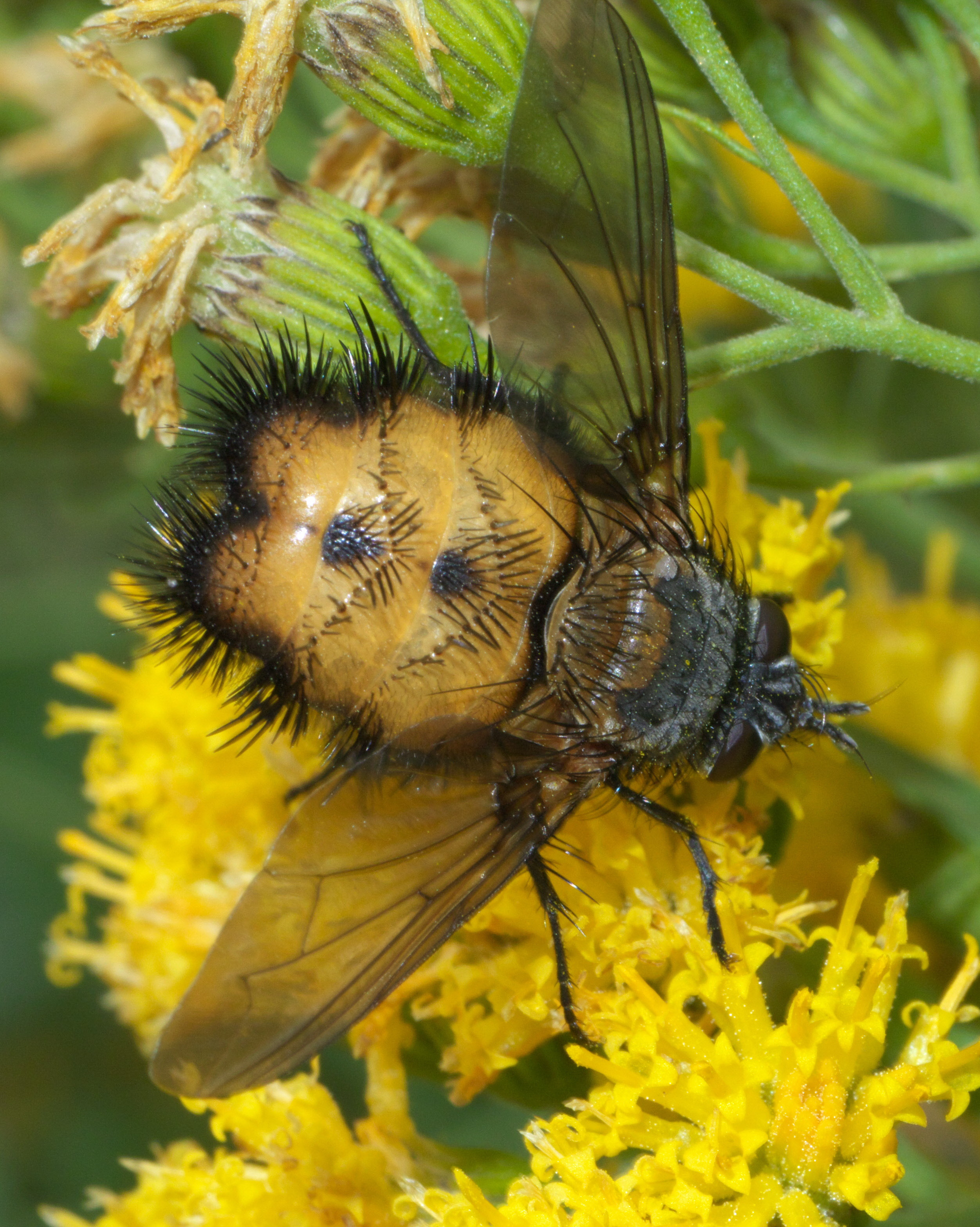

Scientific classification
- Kingdom: Animalia
- Phylum: Arthropoda
- Class: Insecta
- Order: Diptera
- Family: Tachinidae
- Subfamily: Tachininae
- Tribe: Tachinini
- Genus: Paradejeania
- Species: P. rutilioides

Binomial name
- Paradejeania rutilioides (Jaennicke, 1867)

Synonyms
- Dejeania rutilioides Jaennicke, 1867

= Paradejeania rutilioides =

Species of fly

Paradejeania rutilioides, known generally as the spiny tachina fly or hedgehog fly, is a species of bristle fly in the family Tachinidae.

== Distribution ==
North and Central America
