= Deopalpus =

Scientific classification
- Kingdom: Animalia
- Phylum: Arthropoda
- Clade: Pancrustacea
- Class: Insecta
- Order: Diptera
- Family: Tachinidae
- Subfamily: Tachininae
- Tribe: Tachinini
- Genus: Deopalpus; Townsend, 1908

Synonyms
- Spanipalpus Townsend, 1908; Spanipalpis Coquillett, 1910; Procyanopsis Townsend, 1934

Genus of flies

Deopalpus is a genus of flies in the family Tachinidae.

== Species ==
- Deopalpus albimaculus (Wiedemann, 1830)
- Deopalpus aldrichi (Townsend, 1931)
- Deopalpus australis (Townsend, 1928)
- Deopalpus beameri (Reinhard, 1934)
- Deopalpus buccatus (Reinhard, 1934)
- Deopalpus conformis (Reinhard, 1934)
- Deopalpus conspiciendum (Cortés, 1976)
- Deopalpus decoratus (Rondani, 1851)
- Deopalpus flavicornis (Reinhard, 1934)
- Deopalpus fucatus (Wulp, 1892)
- Deopalpus geminatus (Reinhard, 1934)
- Deopalpus hiemalis (Cortés, 1983)
- Deopalpus hirsutus Townsend, 1908
- Deopalpus miscelli (Coquillett, 1897)
- Deopalpus ochricornis (Bigot, 1888)
- Deopalpus parksi (Reinhard, 1934)
- Deopalpus pictipennis (Townsend, 1934)
- Deopalpus picturatus (González, 1992)
- Deopalpus pretiosus (Curran, 1934)
- Deopalpus pruinosus (Rondani, 1863)
- Deopalpus pulchriceps (Aldrich, 1934)
- Deopalpus ratzeburgi (Jaennicke, 1867)
- Deopalpus reinhardi Guimarães, 1963
- Deopalpus rubidus (González, 1992)
- Deopalpus scutellaris (Reinhard, 1934)
- Deopalpus torosus (Reinhard, 1934)
- Deopalpus trinitatis Thompson, 1963
