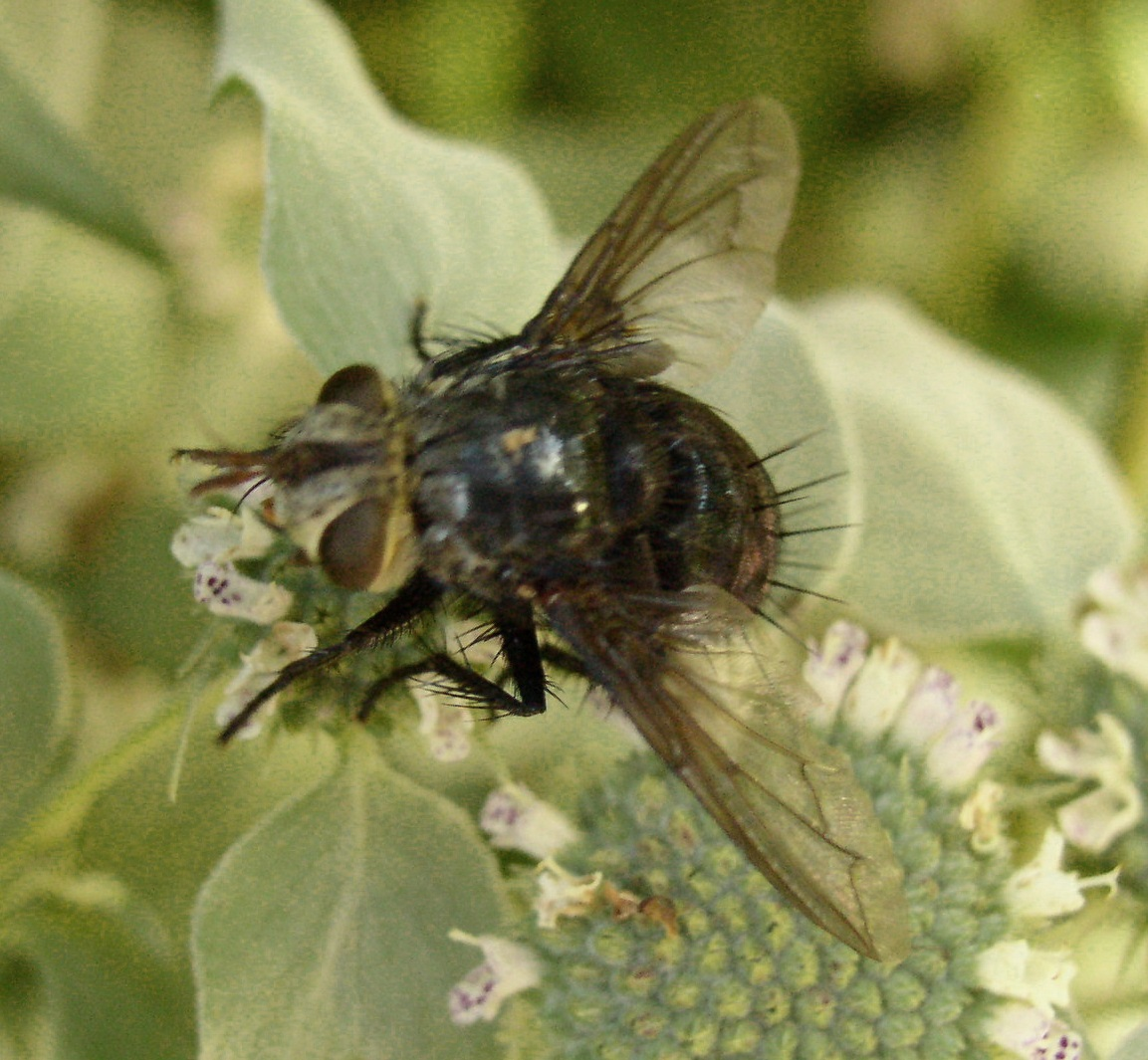

Scientific classification
- Domain: Eukaryota
- Kingdom: Animalia
- Phylum: Arthropoda
- Class: Insecta
- Order: Diptera
- Family: Tachinidae
- Genus: Archytas
- Species: A. metallicus

Binomial name
- Archytas metallicus (Robineau-Desvoidy, 1830)

Synonyms
- Echinomyia georgica Robineau-Desvoidy, 1830; Jurinea fuscipennis Robineau-Desvoidy, 1830; Jurinia boscii Macquart, 1835; Jurinia hystricoides Jaennicke, 1867; Jurinia metallica Williston, 1886; Tachina datanae Bruner, 1890

= Archytas metallicus =

Species of fly

Archytas metallicus is a species of bristle fly in the family Tachinidae. It is found in North America.
