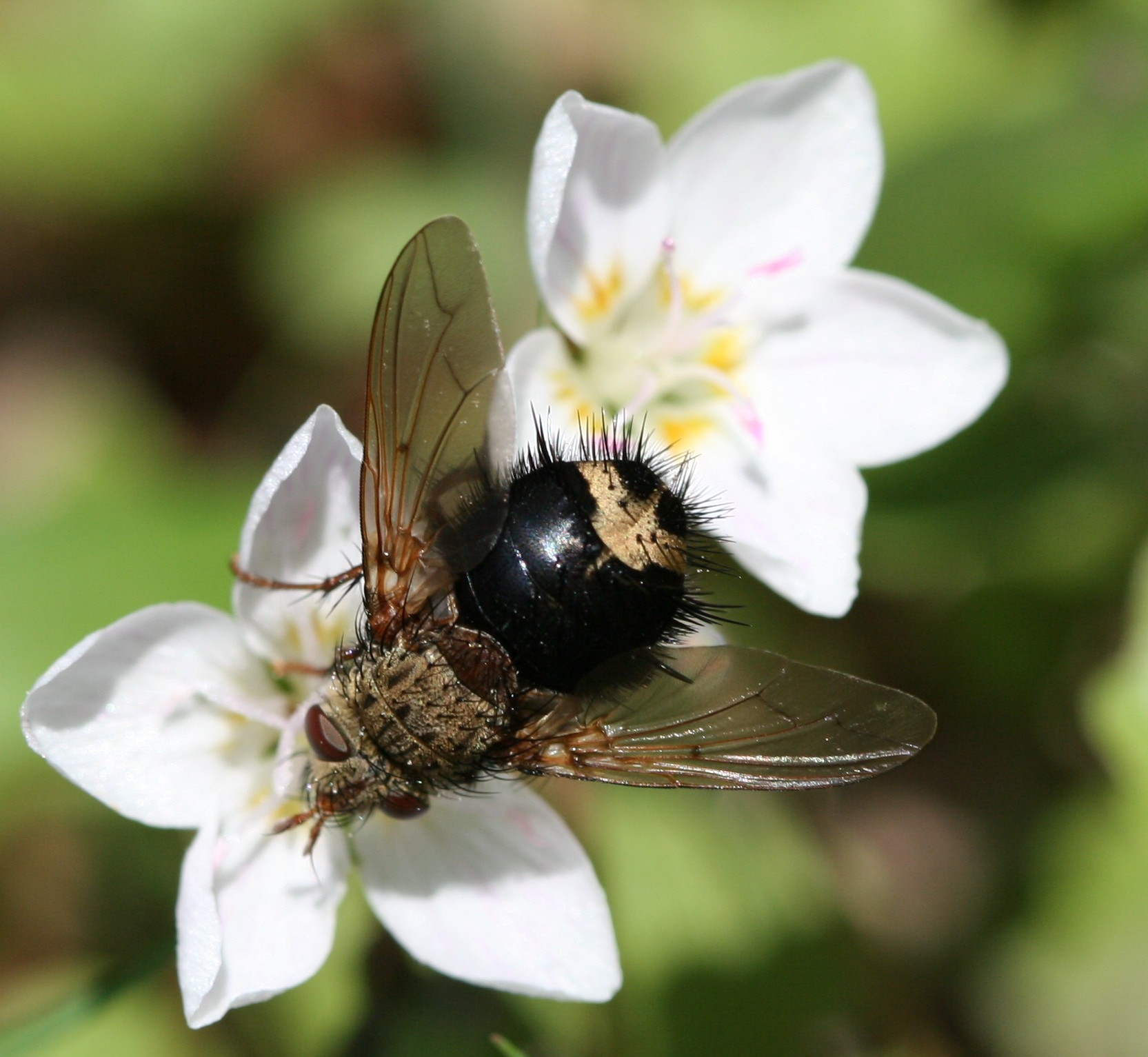
- Epalpus signifer

Scientific classification
- Kingdom: Animalia
- Phylum: Arthropoda
- Class: Insecta
- Order: Diptera
- Family: Tachinidae
- Subfamily: Tachininae
- Tribe: Tachinini
- Genus: Epalpus; Rondani, 1850

Synonyms
- Argentoepalpus Townsend, 1919; Eusignosoma Townsend, 1914

= Epalpus =

Genus of flies

Epalpus is a genus of flies in the family Tachinidae.

== Species ==
- Epalpus affinis Schiner, 1868
- Epalpus albomaculatus (Jaennicke, 1867)
- Epalpus alligans (Walker, 1849)
- Epalpus alternus (Walker, 1849)
- Epalpus aureus (Townsend, 1914)
- Epalpus aurifer (Walker, 1849)
- Epalpus bolivianus Bischof, 1904
- Epalpus brunneipennis Bischof, 1904
- Epalpus callanganus Bischof, 1904
- Epalpus canus (Wulp, 1888)
- Epalpus consanguineus (Wulp, 1892)
- Epalpus contrarius (Walker, 1849)
- Epalpus denudatus Bischof, 1904
- Epalpus femoratus (Wulp, 1892)
- Epalpus flavicans (Macquart, 1846)
- Epalpus flavipes Vimmer & Soukup, 1940
- Epalpus fuscanipennis Bischof, 1904
- Epalpus imitator (Townsend, 1929)
- Epalpus laticornis (Wulp, 1888)
- Epalpus lativittus (Walker, 1853)
- Epalpus leucomelanus (Walker, 1849)
- Epalpus lindigii Bischof, 1904
- Epalpus lineatus Townsend, 1914
- Epalpus maculus (Macquart, 1844)
- Epalpus montivagus (Wulp, 1892)
- Epalpus nattereri Bischof, 1904
- Epalpus nitidus (Macquart, 1851)
- Epalpus niveus Townsend, 1914
- Epalpus ochraceus (Townsend, 1929)
- Epalpus pallitarsis Rondani, 1850
- Epalpus peruvianus (Macquart, 1848)
- Epalpus piceus (Giglio-Tos, 1893)
- Epalpus pictus (Schiner, 1868)
- Epalpus porteri Brèthes, 1918
- Epalpus rostratus Rondani, 1868
- Epalpus rufipennis (Macquart, 1846)
- Epalpus rufipes (Brooks, 1949)
- Epalpus rufitibia (Wulp, 1888)
- Epalpus rufiventris (Macquart, 1844)
- Epalpus semiater Bischof, 1904
- Epalpus semiflava Bischof, 1904
- Epalpus signifer (Walker, 1849)
- Epalpus tarsalis (Schiner, 1868)
- Epalpus testaceus (Wulp, 1888)
- Epalpus unicolor Wulp, 1888

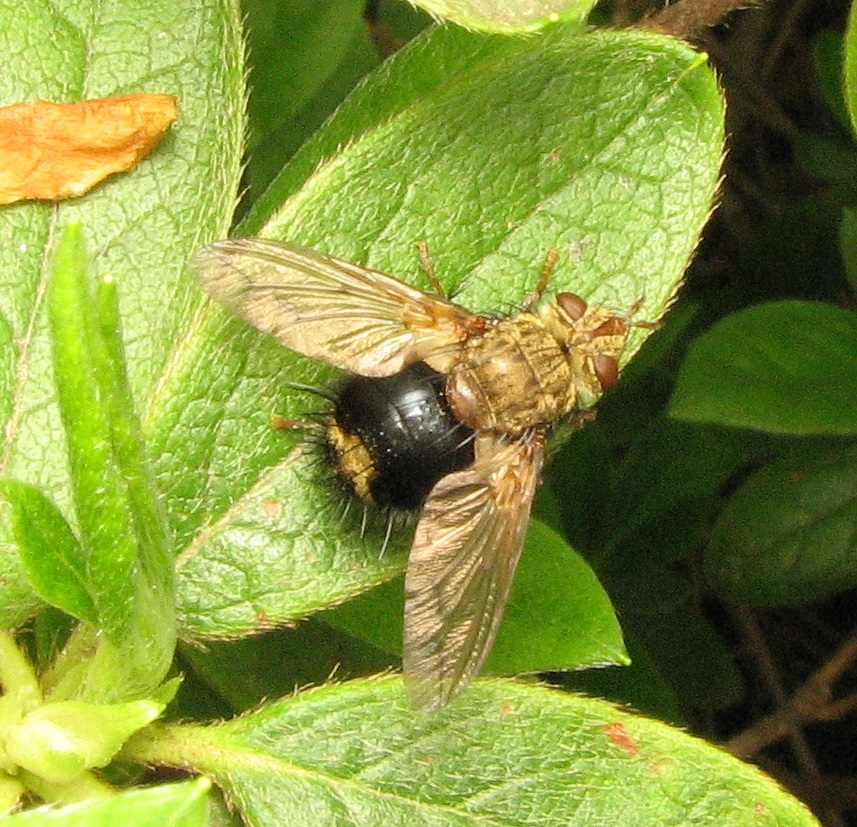
Epalpus signifer
