= Deopalpus conformis =

Scientific classification
- Kingdom: Animalia
- Phylum: Arthropoda
- Class: Insecta
- Order: Diptera
- Family: Tachinidae
- Subfamily: Tachininae
- Tribe: Tachinini
- Genus: Deopalpus
- Species: D. conformis

Binomial name
- Deopalpus conformis (Reinhard, 1934)

Synonyms
- Cuphocera conformis Reinhard, 1934

Species of fly

Deopalpus conformis is a species of bristle fly in the family Tachinidae.

== Distribution ==
Arizona
