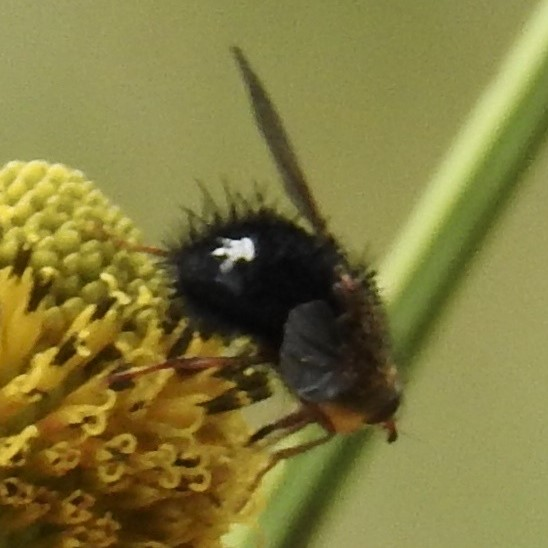

Scientific classification
- Kingdom: Animalia
- Phylum: Arthropoda
- Class: Insecta
- Order: Diptera
- Family: Tachinidae
- Tribe: Tachinini
- Genus: Epalpus
- Species: E. albomaculatus

Binomial name
- Epalpus albomaculatus (Jaennicke, 1867)

Synonyms
- Micropalpus albomaculatus Jaennicke, 1867; Saundersia maculata Williston, 1886

= Epalpus albomaculatus =

Species of fly

Epalpus albomaculatus is a species of bristle fly in the family Tachinidae. It is found in North America.
