= Deopalpus hirsutus =

Scientific classification
- Kingdom: Animalia
- Phylum: Arthropoda
- Clade: Pancrustacea
- Class: Insecta
- Order: Diptera
- Family: Tachinidae
- Subfamily: Tachininae
- Tribe: Tachinini
- Genus: Deopalpus
- Species: D. hirsutus

Binomial name
- Deopalpus hirsutus Townsend, 1908

Synonyms
- Cuphocera aurifrons Reinhard, 1924

Species of fly

Deopalpus hirsutus is a species of bristle fly in the family Tachinidae.

== Distribution ==
Canada, United States, Mexico
