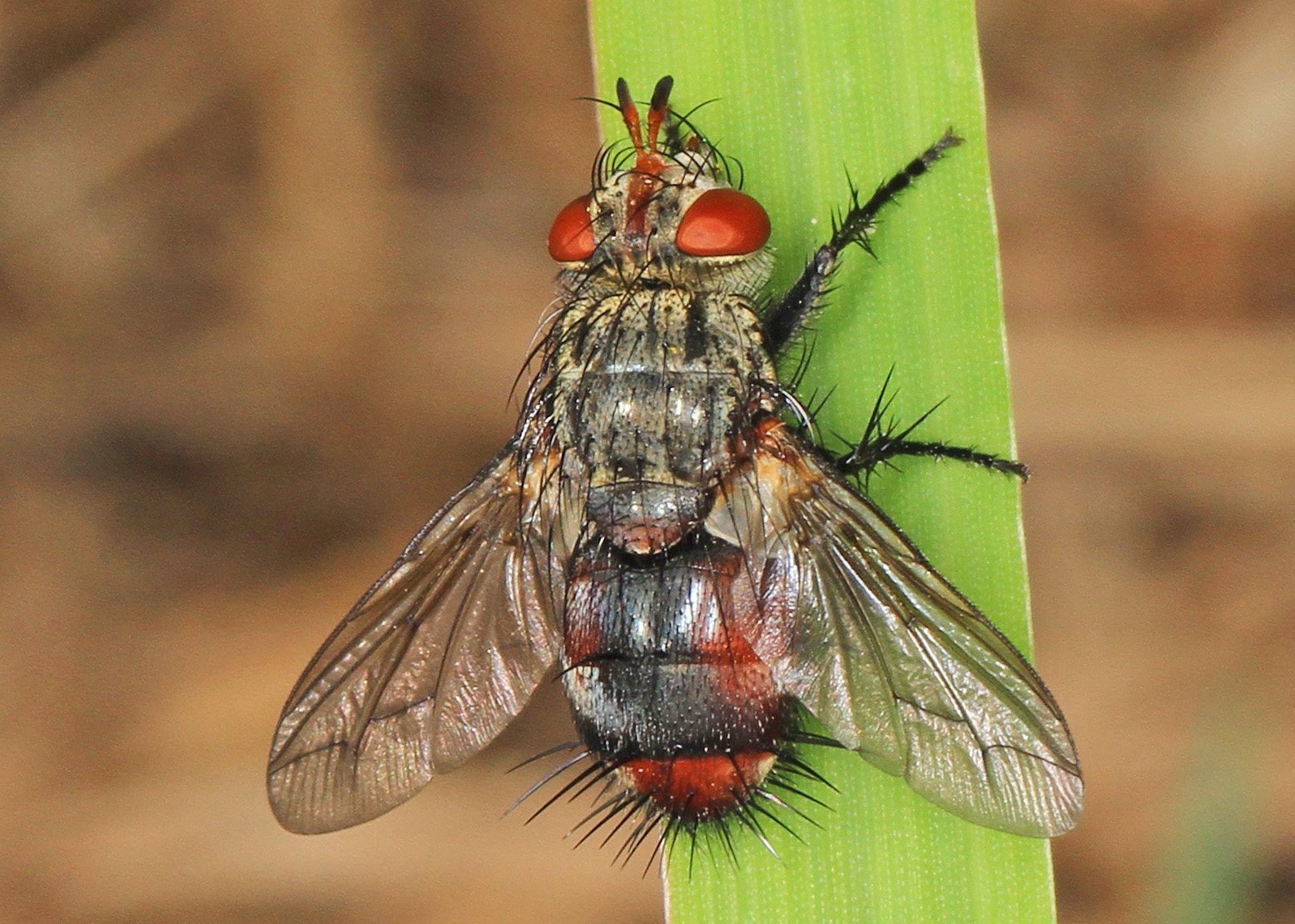
- Archytas rufiventris

Scientific classification
- Kingdom: Animalia
- Phylum: Arthropoda
- Class: Insecta
- Order: Diptera
- Family: Tachinidae
- Subfamily: Tachininae
- Tribe: Tachinini
- Genus: Archytas
- Species: A. rufiventris

Binomial name
- Archytas rufiventris Curran, 1928

= Archytas rufiventris =

Species of fly

Archytas rufiventris is a species of bristle fly in the family Tachinidae.

== Distribution ==
United States.
