= Archytas analis =

Scientific classification
- Kingdom: Animalia
- Phylum: Arthropoda
- Class: Insecta
- Order: Diptera
- Family: Tachinidae
- Subfamily: Tachininae
- Tribe: Tachinini
- Genus: Archytas
- Species: A. analis

Binomial name
- Archytas analis (Fabricius, 1805)

Synonyms
- Tachina analis Fabricius, 1805; Archytas plangens Curran, 1928

Species of fly

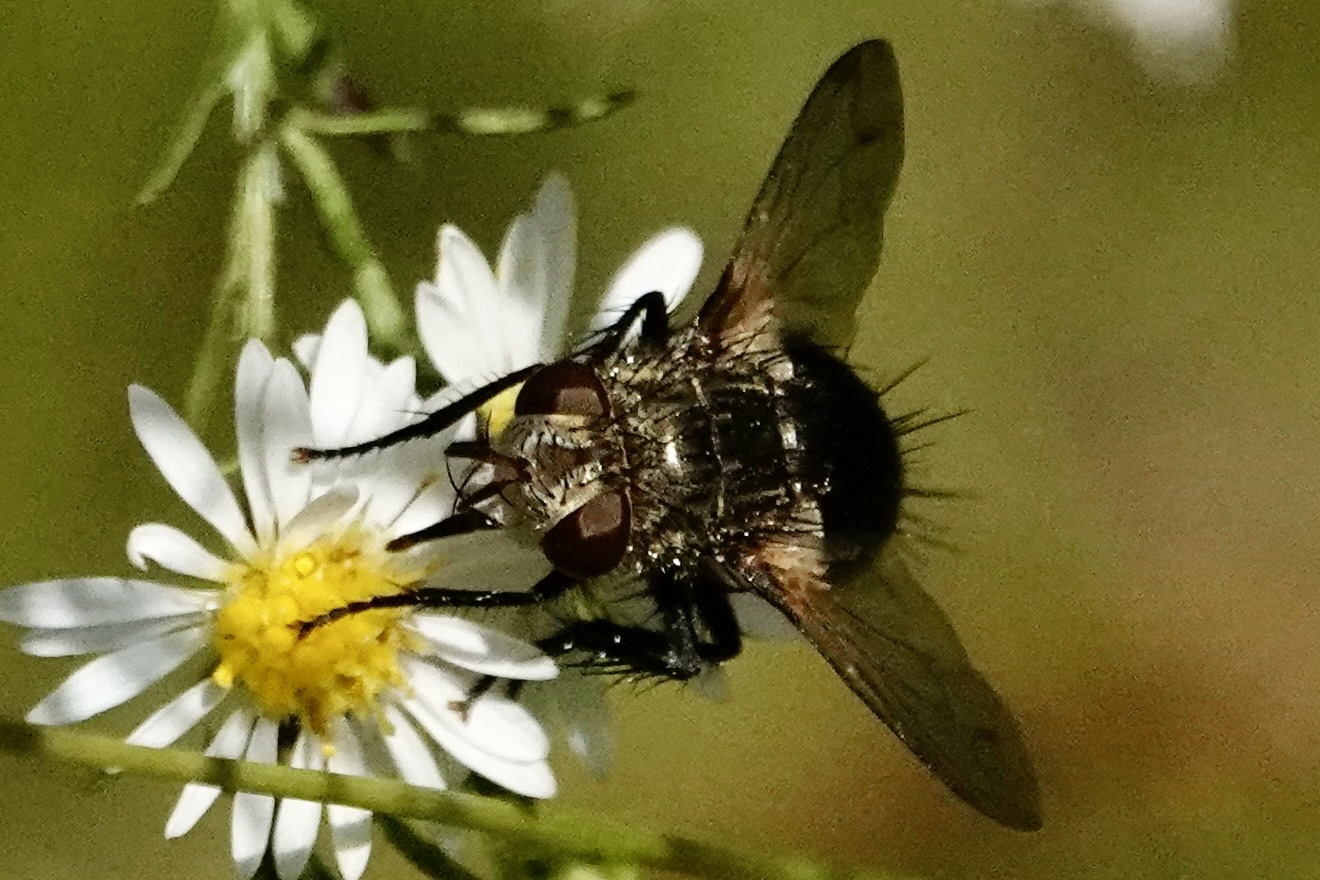

Archytas analis is a species of bristle fly in the family Tachinidae.

== Distribution ==
The species is found in South America.
