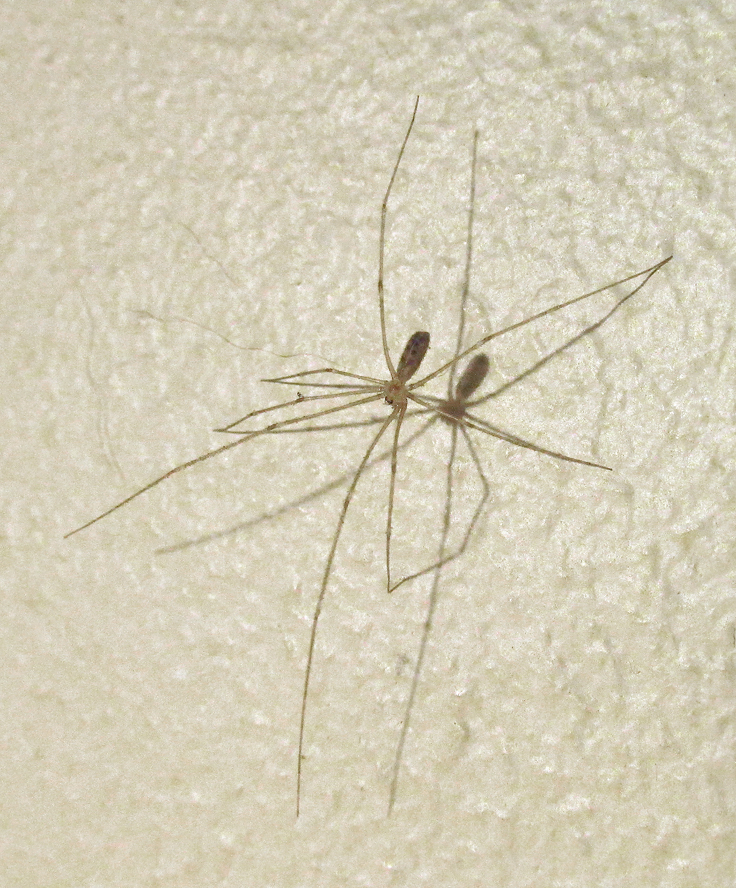

Scientific classification
- Kingdom: Animalia
- Phylum: Arthropoda
- Subphylum: Chelicerata
- Class: Arachnida
- Order: Araneae
- Infraorder: Araneomorphae
- Family: Pholcidae
- Genus: Psilochorus
- Species: P. simoni

Binomial name
- Psilochorus simoni (Berland, 1911)

= Psilochorus simoni =

Species of spider

Psilochorus simoni is a species of cellar spider in the family Pholcidae. It is found in the United States, and has been introduced into Europe, Turkey, and New Zealand.

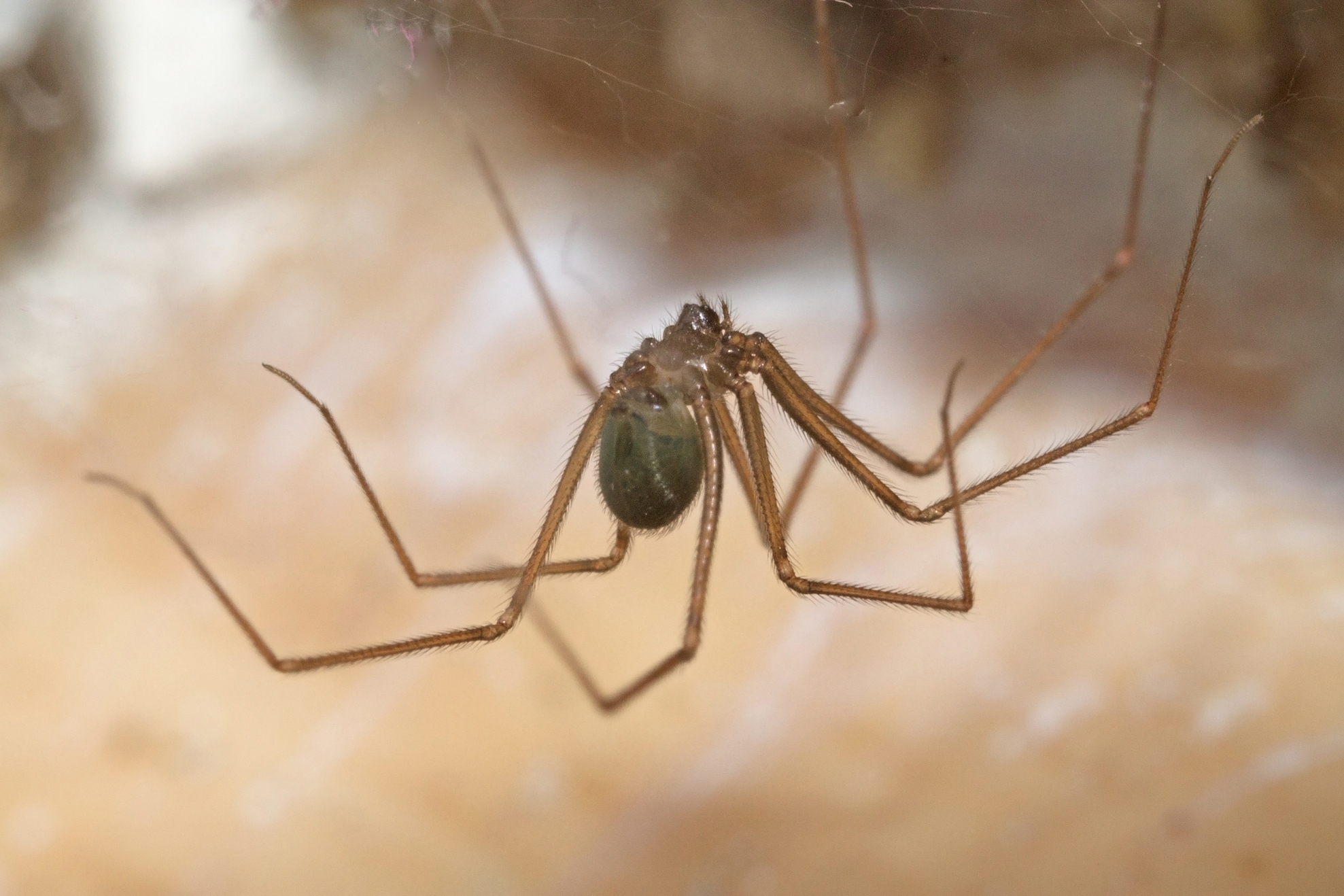

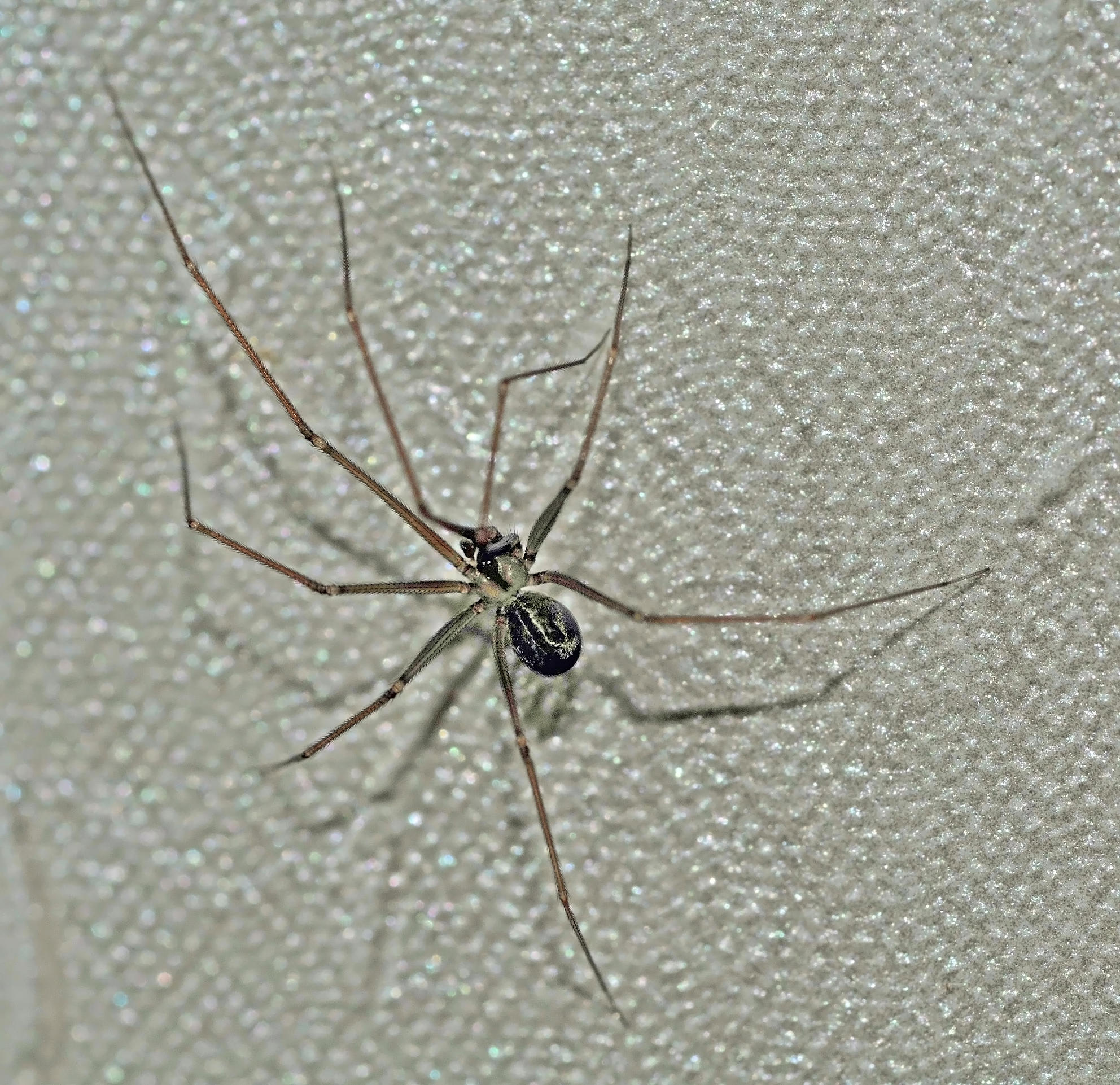

The species gained its name "Wine Cellar Spider" after typically being found in wine cellars. Today, this species happily thrives in garden centres and greenhouses - creating a tidy, dome shaped web.
