= Psilochorus imitatus =

Scientific classification
- Domain: Eukaryota
- Kingdom: Animalia
- Phylum: Arthropoda
- Subphylum: Chelicerata
- Class: Arachnida
- Order: Araneae
- Infraorder: Araneomorphae
- Family: Pholcidae
- Genus: Psilochorus
- Species: P. imitatus

Binomial name
- Psilochorus imitatus Gertsch & Mulaik, 1940

Species of spider

Psilochorus imitatus is a species of cellar spider in the family Pholcidae. It is found in the United States.
