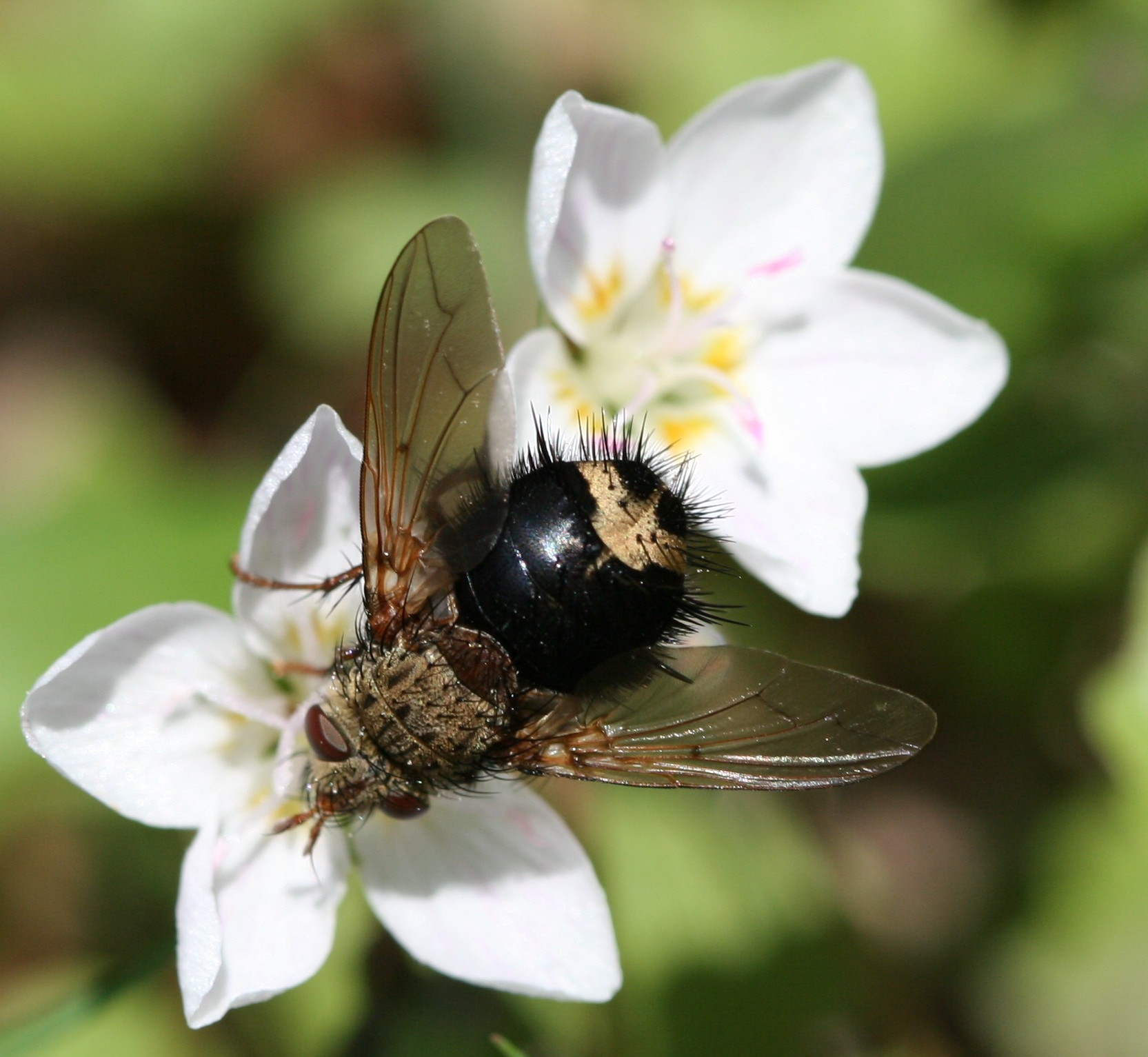

Scientific classification
- Kingdom: Animalia
- Phylum: Arthropoda
- Class: Insecta
- Order: Diptera
- Family: Tachinidae
- Tribe: Tachinini
- Genus: Epalpus
- Species: E. signifer

Binomial name
- Epalpus signifer (Walker, 1849)

Synonyms
- Tachina signifera Walker, 1849

= Epalpus signifer =

Species of fly

Epalpus signifer is a species of bristle fly in the family Tachinidae. It is found in North America.

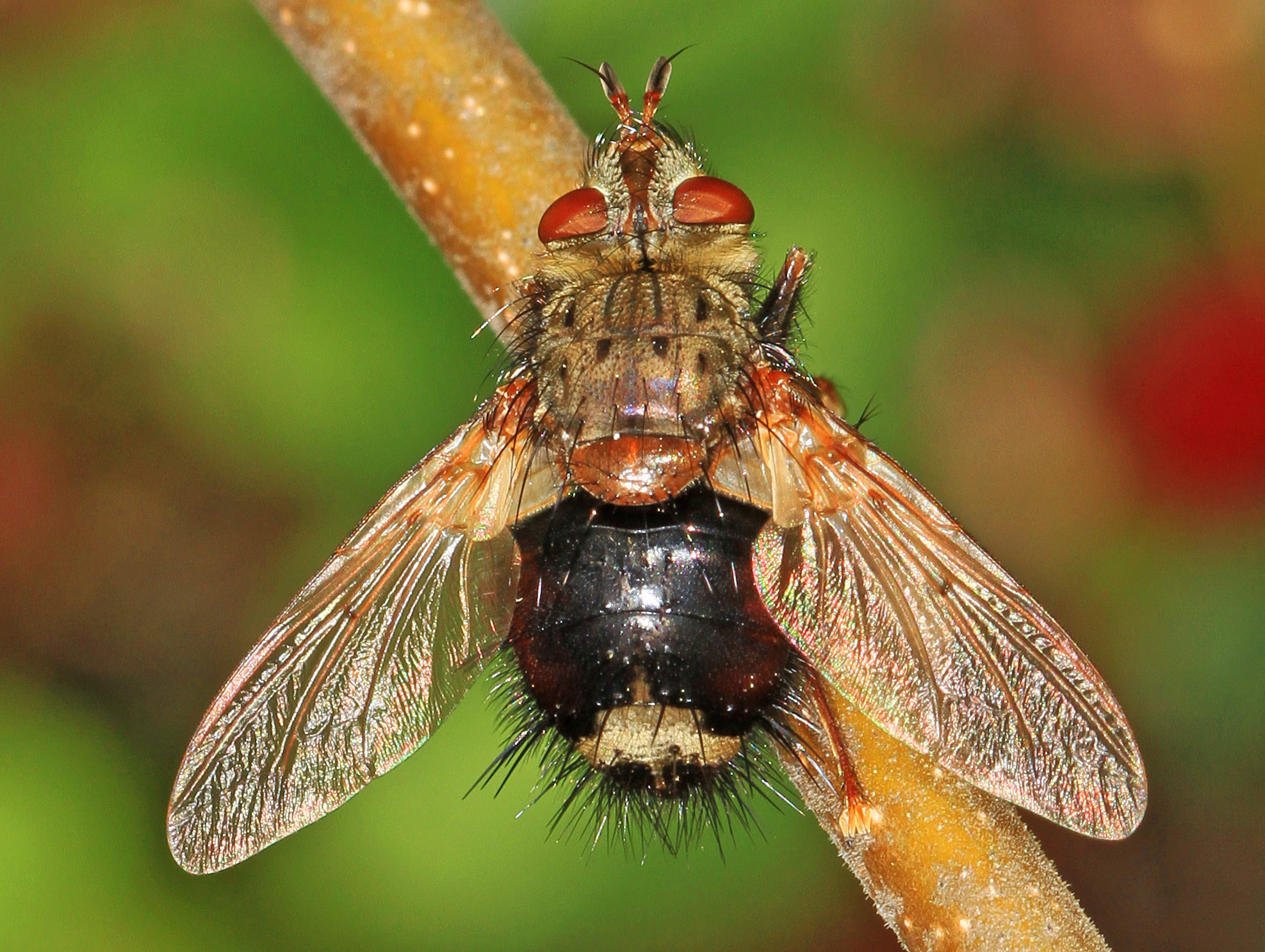
