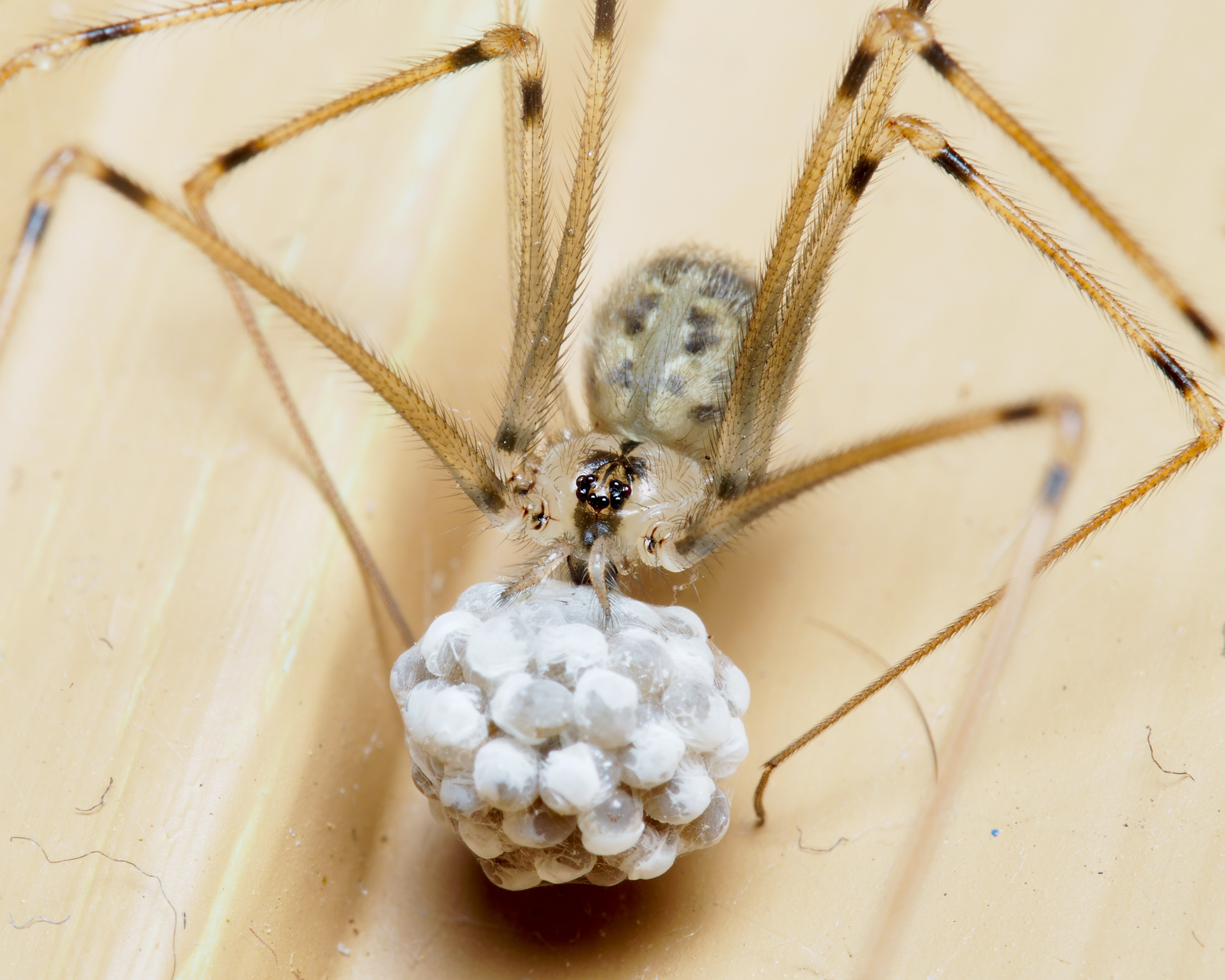
- Psilochorus sp with eggs

Scientific classification
- Kingdom: Animalia
- Phylum: Arthropoda
- Subphylum: Chelicerata
- Class: Arachnida
- Order: Araneae
- Infraorder: Araneomorphae
- Family: Pholcidae
- Genus: Psilochorus; Simon, 1893

Type species
- Theridion pullulum Hentz, 1850

Species
- P. pullulus P. simoni many more

Diversity
- c. 41 species

= Psilochorus =

Genus of spiders

Psilochorus is a genus of spiders in the family Pholcidae.

== Description ==
The abdomen of Psilochorus species is humped and oval. The eight eyes are located in two rows.

== Distribution ==
Most described species are found in the New World, especially from Mexico and the United States, but other species occur in South America. P. simoni is found only in Europe. P. nigromaculatus was described from New Guinea, but is certainly misplaced.

== Name ==
The first part of the genus name is from Ancient Greek psilos "naked". The second part could be derived from a Greek word for "dance", or "separate".

== Species ==
- Psilochorus acanthus Chamberlin & Ivie, 1942 — USA
- Psilochorus agnosticus Chamberlin, 1924 — Mexico
- Psilochorus apicalis Banks, 1921 — USA
- Psilochorus bantus Chamberlin & Ivie, 1942 — USA
- Psilochorus bromelicola (Huber, 2019) — Brazil
- Psilochorus bruneocyaneus Mello-Leitão, 1941 — Brazil
- Psilochorus californiae Chamberlin, 1919 — USA
- Psilochorus cambridgei Gertsch & Davis, 1937 — Mexico
- Psilochorus coahuilanus Gertsch & Davis, 1937 — Mexico
- Psilochorus concinnus Gertsch, 1973 — Mexico
- Psilochorus conjunctus Gertsch & Davis, 1942 — Mexico
- Psilochorus cordatus (Bilimek, 1867) — Mexico
- Psilochorus cornutus (Keyserling, 1887) — USA
- Psilochorus delicatus Gertsch, 1971 — Mexico
- Psilochorus diablo Gertsch, 1971 — Mexico
- Psilochorus dogmaticus Chamberlin, 1924 — Mexico
- Psilochorus durangoanus Gertsch & Davis, 1937 — Mexico
- Psilochorus fishi Gertsch, 1971 — Mexico
- Psilochorus hesperus Gertsch & Ivie, 1936 — USA
- Psilochorus hooki Slowik, 2009 — USA
- Psilochorus imitatus Gertsch & Mulaik, 1940 — USA, Mexico
- Psilochorus inyo Slowik, 2009 — USA
- Psilochorus itaguyrussu Huber, Rheims & Brescovit, 2005 — Brazil
- Psilochorus minimus Schmidt, 1956 — Ecuador
- Psilochorus minutus Banks, 1898 — Mexico
- Psilochorus murphyi Gertsch, 1973 — Mexico
- Psilochorus pallidulus Gertsch, 1935 — USA, Mexico
- Psilochorus papago Gertsch & Davis, 1942 — USA, Mexico
- Psilochorus pullulus (Hentz, 1850) — New World
- Psilochorus redemptus Gertsch & Mulaik, 1940 — USA, Mexico
- Psilochorus rockefelleri Gertsch, 1935 — USA
- Psilochorus russelli Gertsch, 1971 — Mexico
- Psilochorus sectus Mello-Leitão, 1939 — Brazil
- Psilochorus simoni (Berland, 1911) — Europe
- Psilochorus sinaloa Gertsch & Davis, 1942 — Mexico
- Psilochorus taperae Mello-Leitão, 1929 — Brazil
- Psilochorus tellezi Gertsch, 1971 — Mexico
- Psilochorus texanus Slowik, 2009 — USA, Mexico
- Psilochorus topanga Chamberlin & Ivie, 1942 — USA
- Psilochorus utahensis Chamberlin, 1919 — USA
- Psilochorus ybytyriguara Huber, Rheims & Brescovit, 2005 — Brazil
