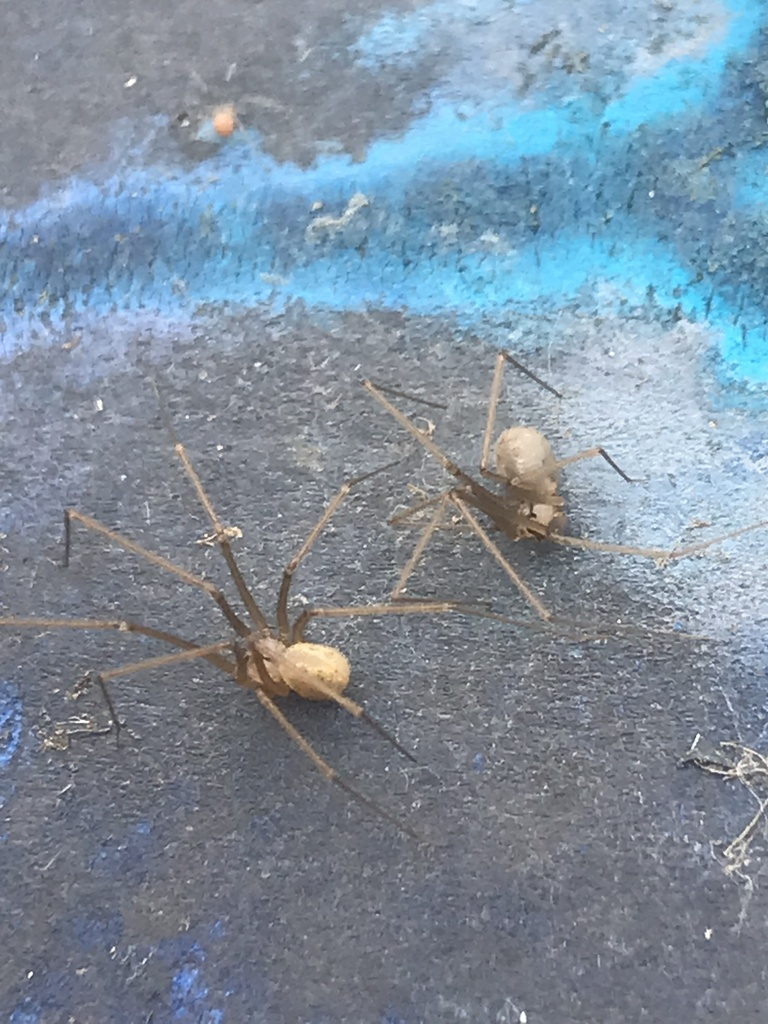

Scientific classification
- Kingdom: Animalia
- Phylum: Arthropoda
- Subphylum: Chelicerata
- Class: Arachnida
- Order: Araneae
- Infraorder: Araneomorphae
- Family: Pholcidae
- Genus: Psilochorus
- Species: P. hesperus

Binomial name
- Psilochorus hesperus Gertsch & Ivie, 1936

= Psilochorus hesperus =

Species of spider

Psilochorus hesperus is a spider found in cellars and rock boulder nooks in the Northwestern United States and in British Columbia. Adult males have curved spikes protruding forward from their jaws.
