= Archytas lanei =

Scientific classification
- Kingdom: Animalia
- Phylum: Arthropoda
- Clade: Pancrustacea
- Class: Insecta
- Order: Diptera
- Family: Tachinidae
- Subfamily: Tachininae
- Tribe: Tachinini
- Genus: Archytas
- Species: A. lanei

Binomial name
- Archytas lanei Guimarães, 1961

Species of fly

Archytas lanei is a species of parasitic fly in the family Tachinidae.

== Distribution ==
Colombia, Brazil.
