= Psilochorus apicalis =

Scientific classification
- Domain: Eukaryota
- Kingdom: Animalia
- Phylum: Arthropoda
- Subphylum: Chelicerata
- Class: Arachnida
- Order: Araneae
- Infraorder: Araneomorphae
- Family: Pholcidae
- Genus: Psilochorus
- Species: P. apicalis

Binomial name
- Psilochorus apicalis Banks, 1921

Species of spider

Psilochorus apicalis is a species of cellar spider in the family Pholcidae. It is found in the USA.
