= Epalpus rufipes =

Scientific classification
- Domain: Eukaryota
- Kingdom: Animalia
- Phylum: Arthropoda
- Class: Insecta
- Order: Diptera
- Family: Tachinidae
- Tribe: Tachinini
- Genus: Epalpus
- Species: E. rufipes

Binomial name
- Epalpus rufipes (Brooks, 1949)

Synonyms
- Argentoepalpus rufipes Brooks, 1949

Species of fly

Epalpus rufipes is a species of bristle fly in the family Tachinidae. It is found in North America.
