= Psilochorus pullulus =

Scientific classification
- Domain: Eukaryota
- Kingdom: Animalia
- Phylum: Arthropoda
- Subphylum: Chelicerata
- Class: Arachnida
- Order: Araneae
- Infraorder: Araneomorphae
- Family: Pholcidae
- Genus: Psilochorus
- Species: P. pullulus

Binomial name
- Psilochorus pullulus (Hentz, 1850)

Synonyms
- Theridion pullulum Pholcus pullulus

Species of spider

Psilochorus pullulus is a species of spider in the family Pholcidae.

== Description ==
The female is 3.5 mm (0.14 in) long, 27 mm (1.1 in) with extended legs. The flattened carapace is nearly circular and pale yellowish brown.

== Behavior ==
While they are often found in the vicinity of old abandoned buildings, they are not found indoors, but live under boards, stones or trash, often associated with Loxosceles. When disturbed they usually run rapidly to a hiding place, but at times crouch motionless.

== Distribution ==
Like almost all species of Psilochorus, P. pullulus is a New World species. It is found in the Eastern United States from Maryland to Georgia and west to Nebraska, Colorado and Arizona, and southward to Argentina.

== Name ==
The species name is derived from Latin pullulus "producing young".
