= Archytas sabroskyi =

Scientific classification
- Kingdom: Animalia
- Phylum: Arthropoda
- Class: Insecta
- Order: Diptera
- Family: Tachinidae
- Subfamily: Tachininae
- Tribe: Tachinini
- Genus: Archytas
- Species: A. sabroskyi

Binomial name
- Archytas sabroskyi Guimarães, 1963

Species of fly

Archytas sabroskyi is a species of parasitic fly in the family Tachinidae.

== Distribution ==
Brazil.
