= Archytas marmoratus =

Scientific classification
- Kingdom: Animalia
- Phylum: Arthropoda
- Class: Insecta
- Order: Diptera
- Family: Tachinidae
- Subfamily: Tachininae
- Tribe: Tachinini
- Genus: Archytas
- Species: A. marmoratus

Binomial name
- Archytas marmoratus (Townsend, 1915)

Synonyms
- Pseudoarchytas marmorata Townsend, 1915

Species of fly

Archytas marmoratus, of the marmoratus species group, is a species of bristle fly in the family Tachinidae. In 1986, it was successfully used in biological control against the fall armyworm.

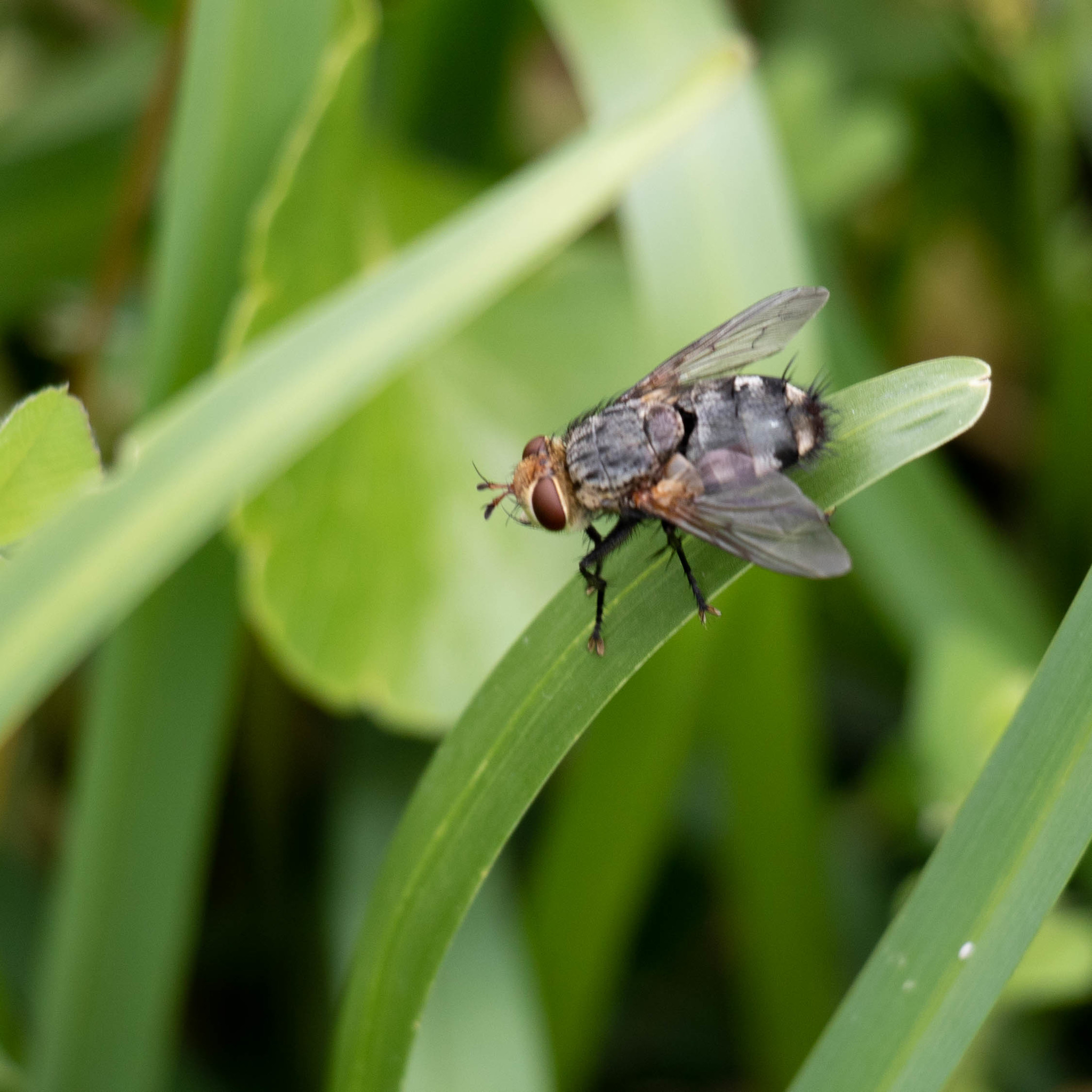
Archytas marmoratus 66502952

== Distribution ==
United States, Cuba, Haiti, Jamaica, Puerto Rico, Barbados, Grenada, Guadeloupe, Montserrat, Virgin Islands, Trinidad and Tobago, Costa Rica, El Salvador, Guatemala, Honduras, Mexico, Nicaragua, Panama, Argentina, Bolivia, Brazil, Chile, Colombia, Ecuador, Guyana, Peru, Suriname, Venezuela.
