= Archytas frenguellii =

Scientific classification
- Kingdom: Animalia
- Phylum: Arthropoda
- Class: Insecta
- Order: Diptera
- Family: Tachinidae
- Subfamily: Tachininae
- Tribe: Tachinini
- Genus: Archytas
- Species: A. frenguellii

Binomial name
- Archytas frenguellii (Blanchard, 1941)

Synonyms
- Archynemochaeta frenguellii Blanchard, 1941

Species of fly

Archytas frenguellii is a species of parasitic fly in the family Tachinidae.

== Distribution ==
Argentina.
