= Eupachygaster =

Scientific classification
- Kingdom: Animalia
- Phylum: Arthropoda
- Class: Insecta
- Order: Diptera
- Family: Stratiomyidae
- Subfamily: Pachygastrinae
- Genus: Eupachygaster; Kertész, 1911

Type species
- Pachygaster tarsalis Zetterstedt, 1842

Genus of flies

Eupachygaster is a genus of flies in the family Stratiomyidae.

== Species ==
- Eupachygaster alexanderi (Brèthes, 1922)
- Eupachygaster flava James, 1977
- Eupachygaster lasiops Speiser, 1922
- Eupachygaster subtarsalis Krivosheina, 2004
- Eupachygaster tarsalis (Zetterstedt, 1842)
