= Archytas araujoi =

Scientific classification
- Kingdom: Animalia
- Phylum: Arthropoda
- Class: Insecta
- Order: Diptera
- Family: Tachinidae
- Subfamily: Tachininae
- Tribe: Tachinini
- Genus: Archytas
- Species: A. araujoi

Binomial name
- Archytas araujoi Guimarães, 1963

Species of fly

Archytas araujoi is a species of parasitic fly in the family Tachinidae. Psychocampa concolor is its host, with adult A. araujoi flies emerging from P. concolor pupae.

== Distribution ==
Brazil.
