= Archytas lateralis =

Scientific classification
- Kingdom: Animalia
- Phylum: Arthropoda
- Class: Insecta
- Order: Diptera
- Family: Tachinidae
- Subfamily: Tachininae
- Tribe: Tachinini
- Genus: Archytas
- Species: A. lateralis

Binomial name
- Archytas lateralis (Macquart, 1843)

Synonyms
- Jurinia lateralis Macquart, 1843

Species of fly

Archytas lateralis is a species of bristle fly in the family Tachinidae.

== Distribution ==
Canada, United States, Mexico.
