= Glyphipterix californiae =

Scientific classification
- Kingdom: Animalia
- Phylum: Arthropoda
- Clade: Pancrustacea
- Class: Insecta
- Order: Lepidoptera
- Family: Glyphipterigidae
- Genus: Glyphipterix
- Species: G. californiae

Binomial name
- Glyphipterix californiae Walsingham, 1881

Species of moth

Glyphipterix californiae is a species of sedge moth in the genus Glyphipterix. It was described by Walsingham in 1881. It is found in California.
