= Archytas californiae =

Scientific classification
- Kingdom: Animalia
- Phylum: Arthropoda
- Class: Insecta
- Order: Diptera
- Family: Tachinidae
- Subfamily: Tachininae
- Tribe: Tachinini
- Genus: Archytas
- Species: A. californiae

Binomial name
- Archytas californiae (Walker, 1853)

Synonyms
- Tachina californiae Walker, 1853

Species of fly

Archytas californiae is a species of bristle fly in the family Tachinidae.

== Distribution ==
Canada, United States.
