= Psilochorus californiae =

Scientific classification
- Kingdom: Animalia
- Phylum: Arthropoda
- Subphylum: Chelicerata
- Class: Arachnida
- Order: Araneae
- Infraorder: Araneomorphae
- Family: Pholcidae
- Genus: Psilochorus
- Species: P. californiae

Binomial name
- Psilochorus californiae Chamberlin, 1919

Species of spider

Psilochorus californiae is a species of cellar spider in the family Pholcidae. It is found in the United States and Mexico.
