= Johann Friedrich Jaennicke =

German entomologist

Johann Friedrich Jaennicke (7 January 1831 in Frankfurt a. M. – 1 April 1907 in Mainz) was a German "Regierungsrat" and entomologist mainly interested in Diptera.

== Works ==
- As Jaennicke, F. (note The author's full initials are J.F.) 1867. Neue exotische Dipteren. Abh. Senckenberg. Naturforsch. Ges. 6: 311–407. (November)
  - This was reprinted, 1868, as "Neue exotische Dipteren aus den Museen zu Frankfurt a. M. und Darmstadt," 99 p.

== Collection ==
Jaennicke's collection is in Senckenberg Museum
