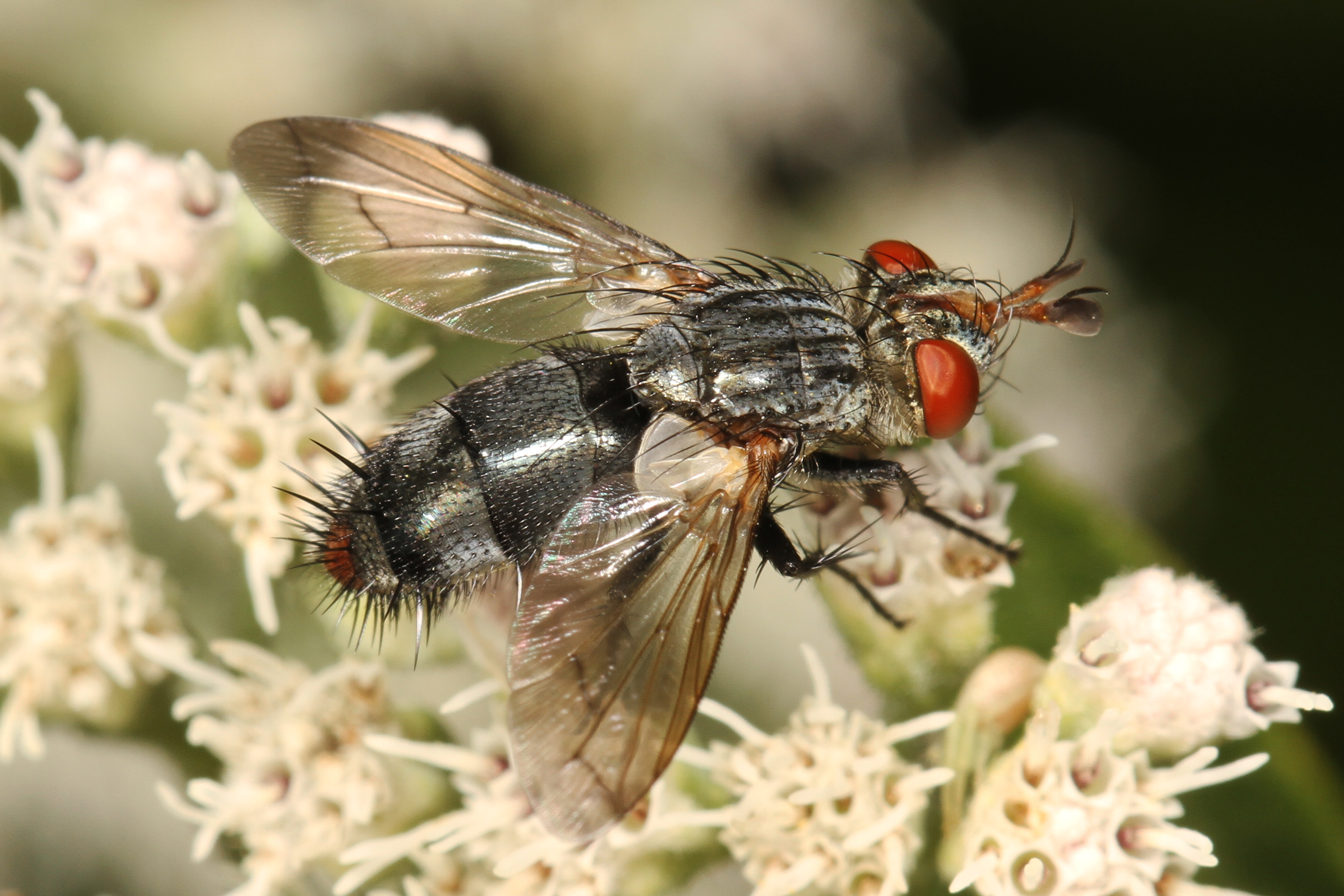
- Tachinid - Copecrypta ruficauda, Meadowood Farm SRMA, Mason Neck, Virginia.

Scientific classification
- Kingdom: Animalia
- Phylum: Arthropoda
- Class: Insecta
- Order: Diptera
- Family: Tachinidae
- Subfamily: Tachininae
- Tribe: Tachinini
- Genus: Copecrypta; Townsend, 1908

= Copecrypta =

Genus of flies

Copecrypta is a genus of flies in the family Tachinidae.

== Species ==
- Copecrypta nitens (Wiedemann, 1830)
- Copecrypta ruficauda (Wulp, 1867)
