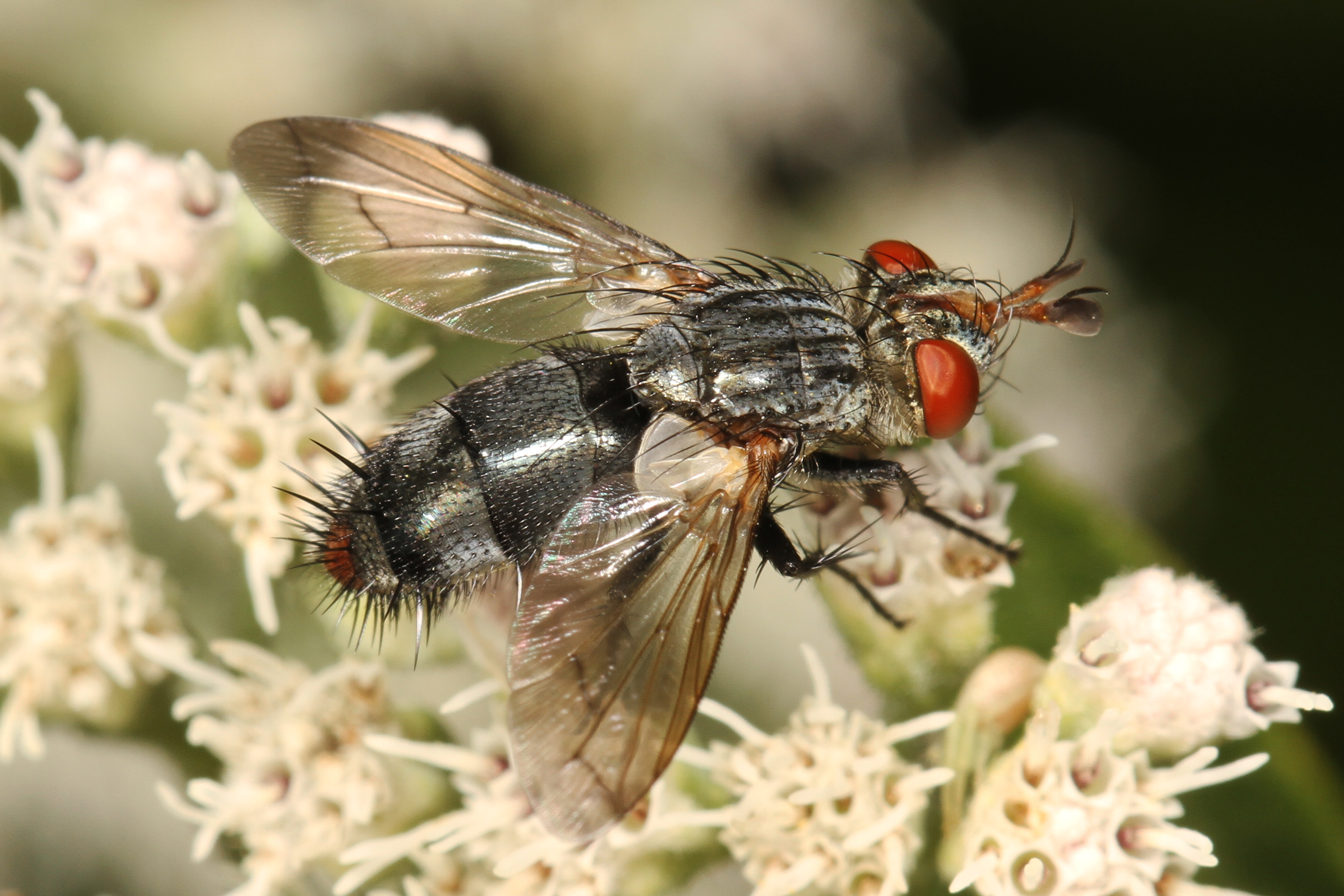

Scientific classification
- Kingdom: Animalia
- Phylum: Arthropoda
- Class: Insecta
- Order: Diptera
- Family: Tachinidae
- Subfamily: Tachininae
- Tribe: Tachinini
- Genus: Copecrypta
- Species: C. ruficauda

Binomial name
- Copecrypta ruficauda (Wulp, 1867)

Synonyms
- Schineria ruficauda Wulp, 1867

= Copecrypta ruficauda =

Species of fly

Copecrypta ruficauda is a species of bristle fly in the family Tachinidae.

== Distribution ==
United States, Mexico
