= Rhachoepalpus olivaceus =

Scientific classification
- Kingdom: Animalia
- Phylum: Arthropoda
- Class: Insecta
- Order: Diptera
- Family: Tachinidae
- Subfamily: Tachininae
- Tribe: Tachinini
- Genus: Rhachoepalpus
- Species: R. olivaceus

Binomial name
- Rhachoepalpus olivaceus Townsend, 1908

Species of fly

Rhachoepalpus olivaceus is a species of bristle fly in the family Tachinidae.

== Distribution ==
Mexico.
