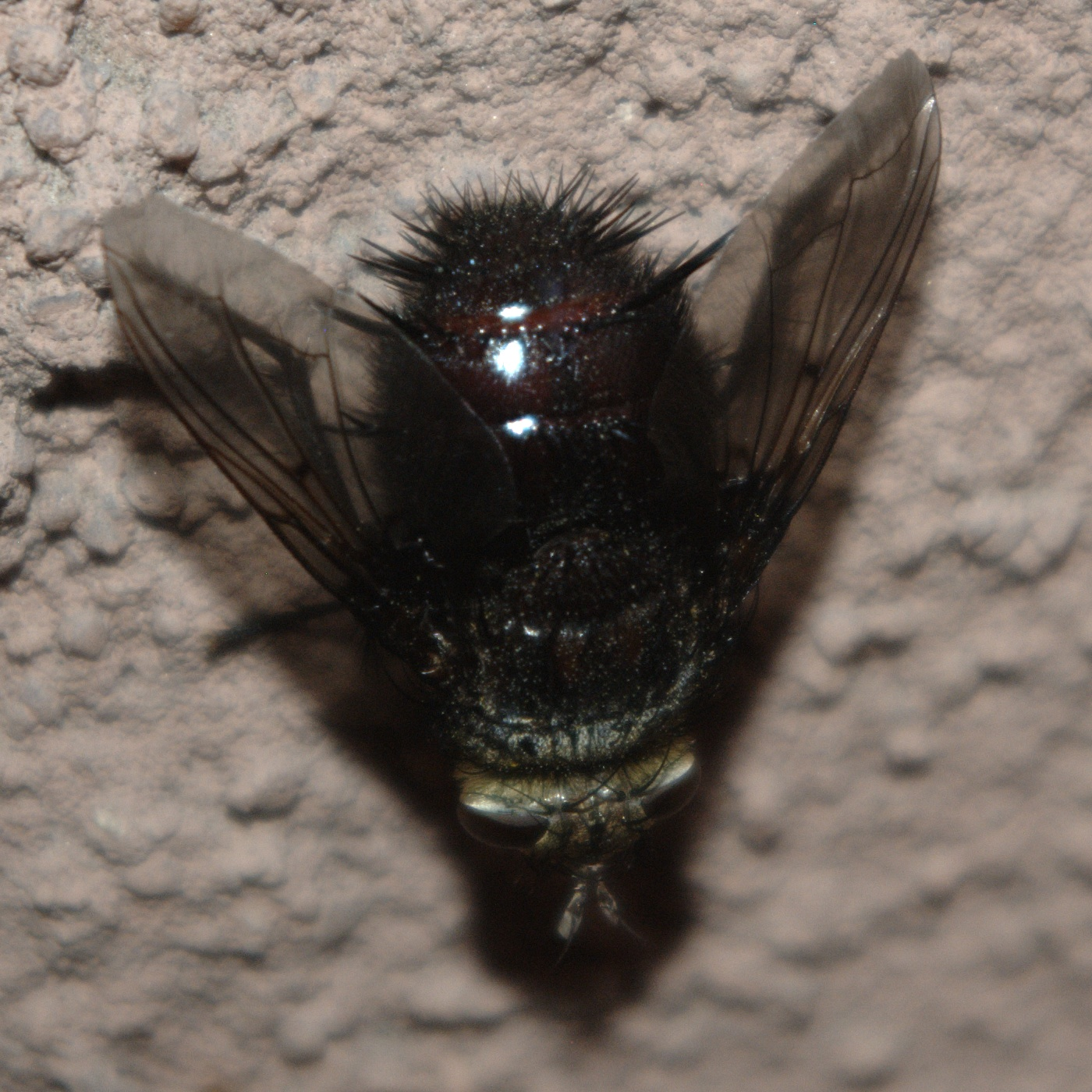
- Juriniopsis aurifrons

Scientific classification
- Kingdom: Animalia
- Phylum: Arthropoda
- Class: Insecta
- Order: Diptera
- Family: Tachinidae
- Subfamily: Tachininae
- Tribe: Tachinini
- Genus: Juriniopsis; Townsend, 1916

Type species
- Juriniopsis floridensis Townsend, 1916

= Juriniopsis =

Genus of flies

Juriniopsis is a genus of flies in the family Tachinidae.

== Species ==
- Juriniopsis adusta (Wulp, 1888)
- Juriniopsis aurifrons Brooks, 1949
- Juriniopsis floridensis Townsend, 1916
- Juriniopsis insularis Curran, 1960
- Juriniopsis lampuris Reinhard, 1953
- Juriniopsis myrrhea (Brauer & Bergenstamm, 1889)
- Juriniopsis niditiventris (Curran, 1928)
- Juriniopsis nitidula (Wulp, 1892)
- Juriniopsis peruana Curran, 1960
