= Icelia =

Scientific classification
- Kingdom: Animalia
- Phylum: Arthropoda
- Class: Insecta
- Order: Diptera
- Family: Tachinidae
- Subfamily: Tachininae
- Tribe: Iceliini
- Genus: Icelia; Robineau-Desvoidy, 1830

Synonyms
- Ervia Robineau-Desvoidy, 1830; Paranaphora Townsend, 1908; Neohypostena Townsend, 1915; Neohpostena Thompson, 1963

Genus of flies

Icelia is a genus of flies in the family Tachinidae.

== Species ==
- Icelia angulata (Wulp, 1890)
- Icelia brasiliensis Robineau-Desvoidy, 1830
- Icelia flavescens Robineau-Desvoidy, 1830
- Icelia guagliumii Guimarães, 1976
- Icelia triquetra (Olivier, 1812)
