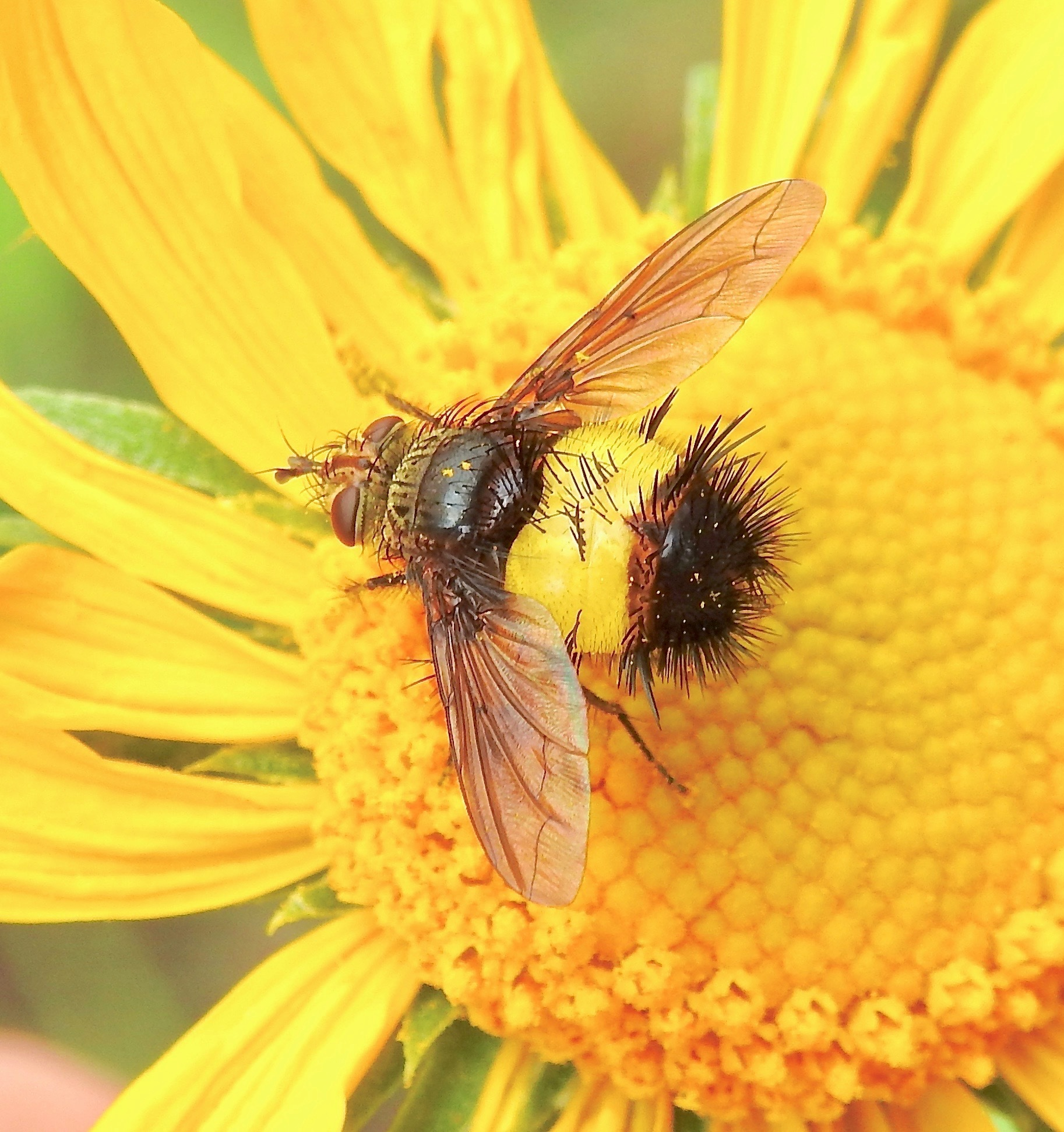
- Xanthoepalpus bicolor

Scientific classification
- Kingdom: Animalia
- Phylum: Arthropoda
- Class: Insecta
- Order: Diptera
- Family: Tachinidae
- Subfamily: Tachininae
- Tribe: Tachinini
- Genus: Xanthoepalpus; Townsend, 1914

Type species
- Saundersia bipartita Wulp, 1888

= Xanthoepalpus =

Genus of flies

Xanthoepalpus is a genus of flies in the family Tachinidae.

== Species ==
- Xanthoepalpus bicolor (Williston, 1886)
- Xanthoepalpus gabanus Townsend, 1914
- Xanthoepalpus laetus Wulp, 1892
- Xanthoepalpus semiflavus Bischof, 1904
