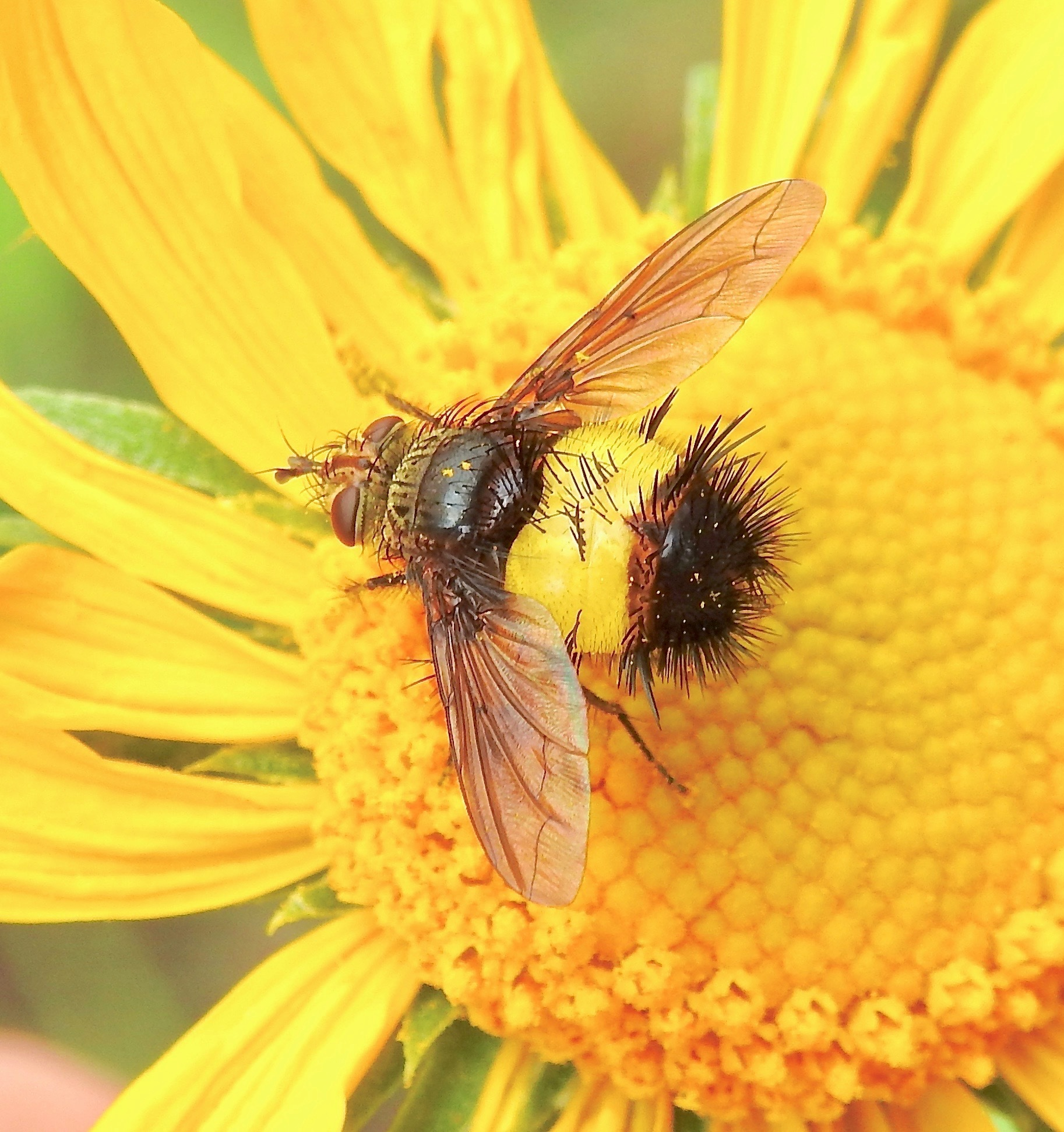

Scientific classification
- Kingdom: Animalia
- Phylum: Arthropoda
- Class: Insecta
- Order: Diptera
- Family: Tachinidae
- Tribe: Tachinini
- Genus: Xanthoepalpus
- Species: X. bicolor

Binomial name
- Xanthoepalpus bicolor (Williston, 1886)

Synonyms
- Cryptopalpus melanopygatus Bigot, 1887; Saundersia bicolor Williston, 1886

= Xanthoepalpus bicolor =

Species of fly

Xanthoepalpus bicolor is a species of bristle fly in the family Tachinidae.

== Distribution ==
United States, Mexico.
