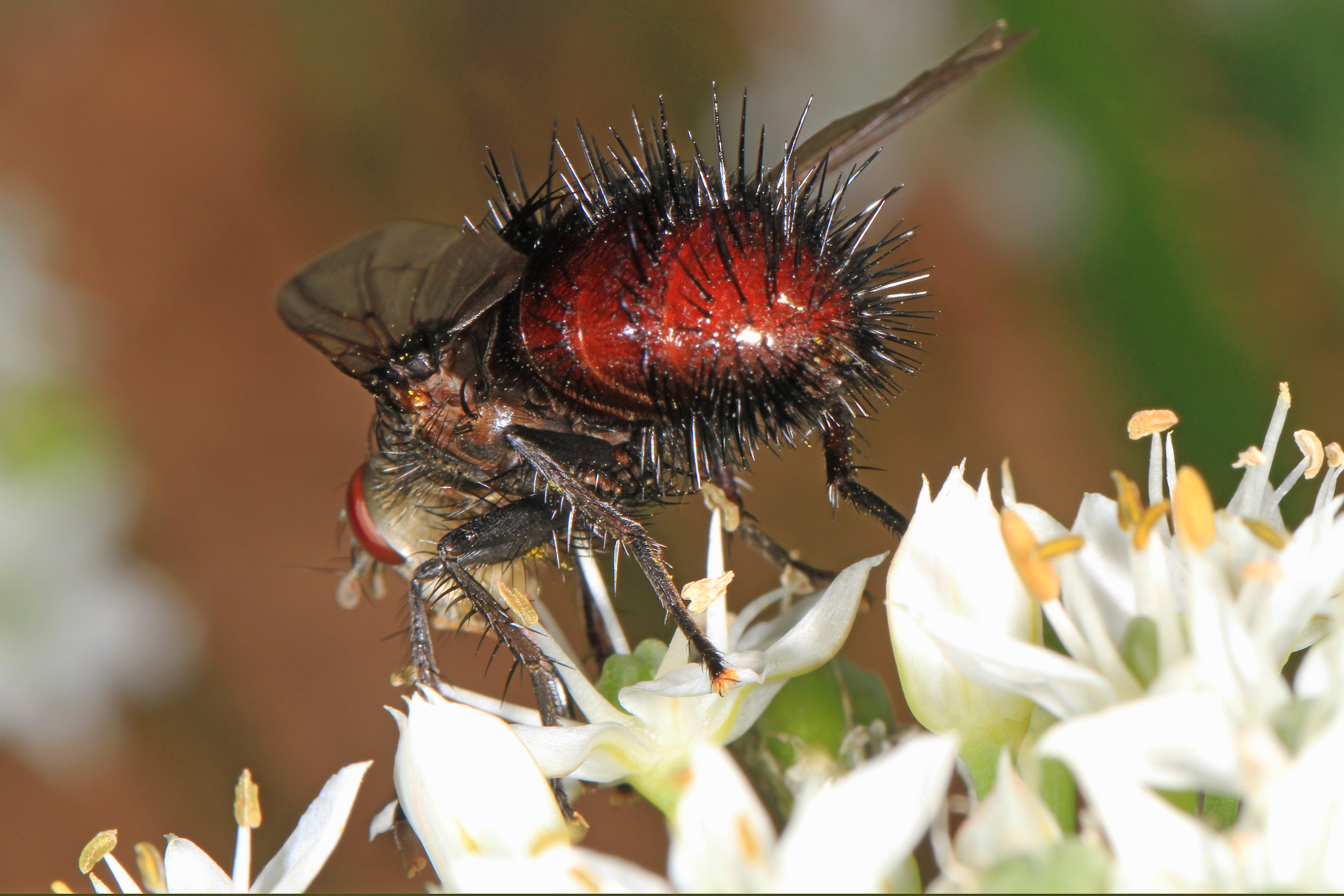

Scientific classification
- Kingdom: Animalia
- Phylum: Arthropoda
- Class: Insecta
- Order: Diptera
- Family: Tachinidae
- Subfamily: Tachininae
- Tribe: Tachinini
- Genus: Juriniopsis
- Species: J. adusta

Binomial name
- Juriniopsis adusta (Wulp, 1888)

Synonyms
- Jurinea myrrhea Brauer & von Bergenstamm, 1889; Jurinia adusta Wulp, 1888

= Juriniopsis adusta =

Species of fly

Juriniopsis adusta is a species of bristle fly in the family Tachinidae.

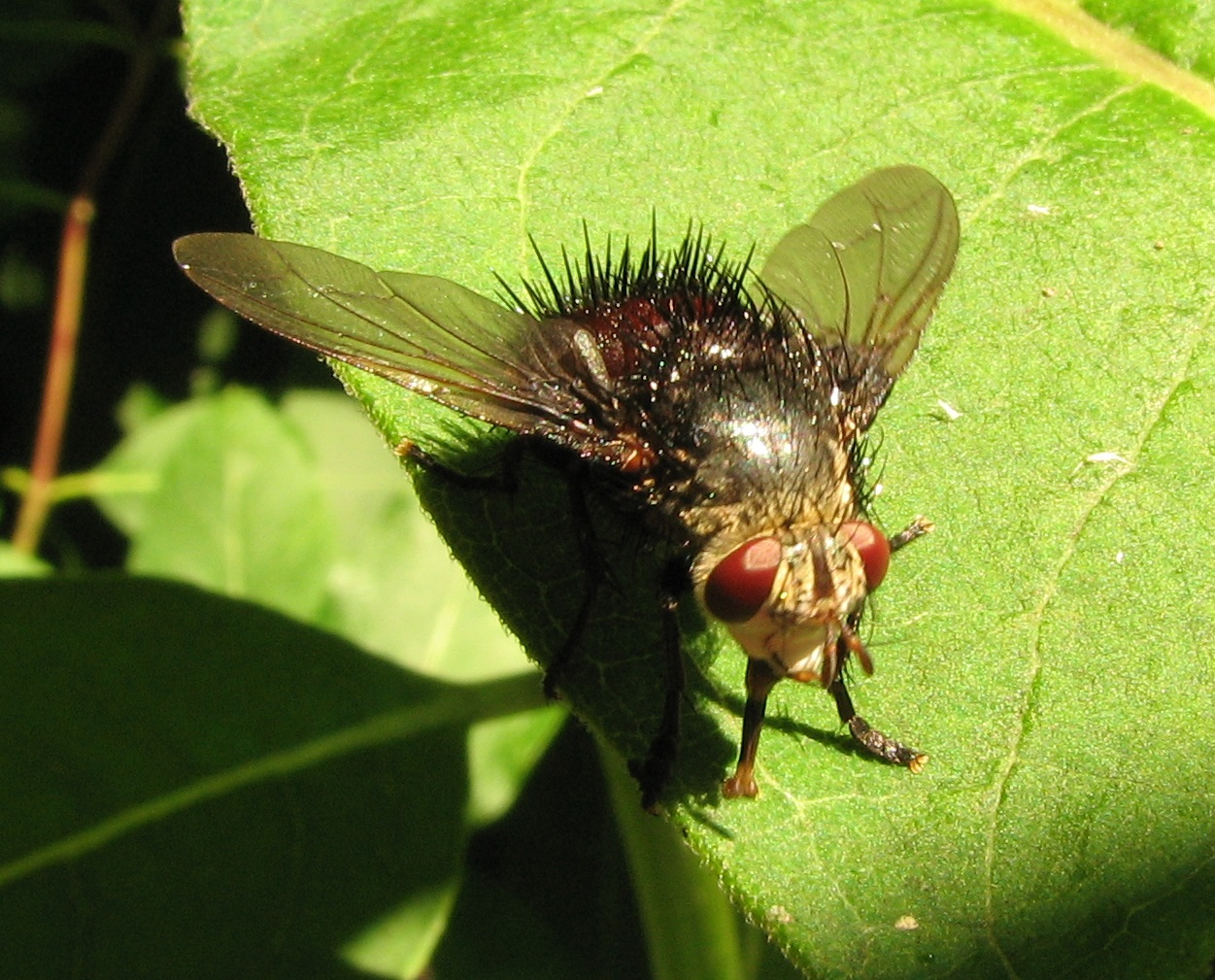
Female

== Distribution ==
Juriniopsis adusta is commonly found in the eastern half of the United States (although can be found throughout), southern parts of eastern Canada (mainly around Toronto), Mexico, Central America, and the northern parts of South America (mainly Colombia and Ecuador).
