= Rhachoepalpus =

Scientific classification
- Kingdom: Animalia
- Phylum: Arthropoda
- Class: Insecta
- Order: Diptera
- Family: Tachinidae
- Subfamily: Tachininae
- Tribe: Tachinini
- Genus: Rhachoepalpus; Townsend, 1908

Type species
- Saundersia testacea Wulp, 1888

Synonyms
- Rhachoepalpodes Townsend, 1935

Genus of flies

Rhachoepalpus is a genus of flies in the family Tachinidae.

== Species ==
- Rhachoepalpus andinus Townsend, 1914
- Rhachoepalpus argenteus Townsend, 1914
- Rhachoepalpus beatus Curran, 1947
- Rhachoepalpus biornatus Curran, 1947
- Rhachoepalpus blandus Curran, 1947
- Rhachoepalpus cinereus Townsend, 1914
- Rhachoepalpus ethelius Curran, 1947
- Rhachoepalpus flavitarsis (Macquart, 1844)
- Rhachoepalpus immaculatus (Macquart, 1846)
- Rhachoepalpus metallicus Curran, 1947
- Rhachoepalpus nitidus Townsend, 1914
- Rhachoepalpus notatus Curran, 1947
- Rhachoepalpus nova Curran, 1947
- Rhachoepalpus ochripes (Wulp, 1888)
- Rhachoepalpus olivaceus Townsend, 1908
- Rhachoepalpus pulvurulentus (Schiner, 1868)
- Rhachoepalpus quatuornotatus (Townsend, 1935)
- Rhachoepalpus triformis (Walker, 1853)
- Rhachoepalpus tucumanus Blanchard, 1941
