= Rhachoepalpus metallicus =

Scientific classification
- Kingdom: Animalia
- Phylum: Arthropoda
- Class: Insecta
- Order: Diptera
- Family: Tachinidae
- Subfamily: Tachininae
- Tribe: Tachinini
- Genus: Rhachoepalpus
- Species: R. metallicus

Binomial name
- Rhachoepalpus metallicus Curran, 1947

Species of fly

Rhachoepalpus metallicus is a species of bristle fly in the family Tachinidae.

== Distribution ==
Ecuador.
