= Juriniopsis floridensis =

Scientific classification
- Kingdom: Animalia
- Phylum: Arthropoda
- Class: Insecta
- Order: Diptera
- Family: Tachinidae
- Subfamily: Tachininae
- Tribe: Tachinini
- Genus: Juriniopsis
- Species: J. floridensis

Binomial name
- Juriniopsis floridensis Townsend, 1916

Species of fly

Juriniopsis floridensis is a species of bristle fly in the family Tachinidae.

== Distribution ==
Florida.
