= Icelia triquetra =

Scientific classification
- Kingdom: Animalia
- Phylum: Arthropoda
- Class: Insecta
- Order: Diptera
- Family: Tachinidae
- Subfamily: Tachininae
- Tribe: Iceliini
- Genus: Icelia
- Species: I. triquetra

Binomial name
- Icelia triquetra (Olivier, 1812)

Synonyms
- Ocyptera triquetra Olivier, 1812; Paranaphora diademoides Townsend, 1908; Tachina mestor Walker, 1849

Species of fly

Icelia triquetra is a species of bristle fly in the family Tachinidae.

== Distribution ==
Brazil, Guyana.
