= Insect paleobiota of Burmese amber =

Fossil resin from the Hukawng Valley, Myanmar

Burmese amber is fossil resin dating to the early Late Cretaceous Cenomanian age recovered from deposits in the Hukawng Valley of northern Myanmar. It is known for being one of the most diverse Cretaceous age amber paleobiotas, containing rich arthropod fossils, along with uncommon vertebrate fossils and even rare marine inclusions. A mostly complete list of all taxa described up to the end of 2023 can be found in Ross (2024).

== Clade Amphiesmenoptera ==
=== Lepidoptera ===
Family	Genus	Species	Authority	Year described	Notes	image
Acanthopteroctetidae	Anawrahta	Anawrahta nudialaria	Mey	2024	An acanthopteroctetid moth	
Agathiphagidae	Agathiphagama	Agathiphagama perdita	Mey, Léger & Lien	2021	An agathiphagid moth	Agathiphagama perdita
Douglasiidae?	Tanyglossus	Tanyglossus orectometopus	Poinar	2017	Originally described as a Douglas moth, but this classification was subsequently contested.	
Gracillariidae	Phyllocnistis	Phyllocnistis cretacea	Fischer	2021	A species of Phyllocnistis.	
Lophocoronidae	Acanthocorona	Acanthocorona bowangi	Mey, Léger & Lien	2021	A lophocoronid moth	
Lophocoronidae	Acanthocorona	Acanthocorona hedida	Zhang, Shih & Engel	2022	A short proboscis lophocoronid moth	
Lophocoronidae	Acanthocorona	Acanthocorona kuranishii	Mey, Léger & Lien	2021	A lophocoronid moth	
Lophocoronidae	Acanthocorona	Acanthocorona muelleri	Mey, Léger & Lien	2021	A lophocoronid moth	Acanthocorona muelleri
Lophocoronidae	Acanthocorona	Acanthocorona sattleri	Mey, Léger & Lien	2021	A lophocoronid moth	
Lophocoronidae	Acanthocorona	Acanthocorona skalskii	Mey, Léger & Lien	2021	A lophocoronid moth	Acanthocorona skalskii
Lophocoronidae	Acanthocorona	Acanthocorona spinifera	Mey, Léger & Lien	2021	A lophocoronid moth	Acanthocorona spinifera
Lophocoronidae	Acanthocorona	Acanthocorona venulosa	Zhang, Shih & Engel	2022	A short proboscis lophocoronid moth	
Lophocoronidae	Acanthocorona	Acanthocorona wichardi	Mey, Léger & Lien	2021	A lophocoronid moth	
Micropterigidae	Archmosaicus	Archmosaicus comitatus	Zhang et al.	2020	A micropterigid moth	
Micropterigidae	Sabatinca	Sabatinca cretacea	Zhang et al.	2017	A micropterigid moth	
Micropterigidae	Sabatinca	Sabatinca limula	Zhang et al.	2017	A micropterigid moth	
Micropterigidae	Sabatinca	Sabatinca perveta	(Cockerell)	1919	A micropterigid moth. First described as "Micropteryx" pervetus	Sabatinca perveta (type illustration)
Micropterigidae	Sabatinca	Sabatinca pouilloni	Ngô-Muller & Nel in Ngô-Muller et al.	2020	A micropterigid moth	
Micropterigidae	Terncladus	Terncladus halonatus	Han, Zhang & Ren in Han et al.	2024	A micropterigid moth	
Micropterigidae	Terncladus	Terncladus lunatus	Han, Zhang & Ren in Han et al.	2024	A micropterigid moth	
incertae sedis	Preheterobathmia	Preheterobathmia grimaldii	Mey	2024	A possible heterobathmiid non-glossatan moth.	Preheterobathmia grimaldii

==== Lepidopteran research ====
- Description of new specimens of caterpillars expanding the morphological diversity of Cretaceous caterpillars, is published by Gauweiler et al. (2022), who also attempt to determine whether Cretaceous caterpillars might have represented an adequate food source for early birds.

=== Tarachoptera ===
Family	Genus	Species	Authority	Year described	Notes	image
Tarachocelidae	Kinitocelis	Kinitocelis brevicostata	Mey et al.	2017	A tarachocelid amphiesmenopteran.	Kinitocelis brevicostata
Tarachocelidae	Kinitocelis	Kinitocelis dashengi	Wang, Engel, Shih & Ren in Wang et al.	2022	A tarachocelid amphiesmenopteran.	
Tarachocelidae	Kinitocelis	Kinitocelis divisonotata	Mey et al.	2017	A tarachocelid amphiesmenopteran.	Kinitocelis divisinotata
Tarachocelidae	Kinitocelis	Kinitocelis hennigi	Mey et al.	2017	A tarachocelid amphiesmenopteran.	Kinitocelis hennigi
Tarachocelidae	Kinitocelis	Kinitocelis macroptera	Mey & Wichard in Mey et al.	2020	A tarachocelid amphiesmenopteran.	
Tarachocelidae	Kinitocelis	Kinitocelis patrickmuelleri	Mey & Wichard	2023	A tarachocelid amphiesmenopteran.	
Tarachocelidae	Kinitocelis	Kinitocelis sparsella	Mey et al.	2018	A tarachocelid amphiesmenopteran.	
Tarachocelidae	Retortocelis	Retortocelis longella	Mey et al.	2018	A tarachocelid amphiesmenopteran.	
Tarachocelidae	Retortocelis	Retortocelis minimella	Mey et al.	2018	A tarachocelid amphiesmenopteran.	
Tarachocelidae	Retortocelis	Retortocelis spicipalpia	Mey & Wichard in Mey et al.	2020	A tarachocelid amphiesmenopteran.	
Tarachocelidae	Retortocelis	Retortocelis tyloptera	Mey et al.	2018	A tarachocelid amphiesmenopteran.	
Tarachocelidae	Tarachocelis	Tarachocelis emmarossae	Mey & Wichard	2023	A tarachocelid amphiesmenopteran.	
Tarachocelidae	Tarachocelis	Tarachocelis microlepidopterella	Mey et al.	2017	A tarachocelid amphiesmenopteran.	Tarachocelis microlepidopterella

=== Trichoptera ===
Family	Genus	Species	Authority	Year described	Notes	image
Burmapsychidae	Burmapsyche	Burmapsyche comosa	Wichard et al.	2018	A burmapsychid sericostomatoid caddisfly	
Burmapsychidae	Burmapsyche	Burmapsyche palpsfurcata	Wichard et al.	2018	A burmapsychid sericostomatoid caddisfly	
Burmapsychidae	Burmapsyche	Burmapsyche wolframmeyi	Wichard & Kuranishi	2023	A burmapsychid sericostomatoid caddisfly	
Calamoceratidae	Bipectinata	Bipectinata orientalis	Wichard et al.	2020	A calamoceratid caddisfly	Bipectinata orientalis
Calamoceratidae	Cretaganonema	Cretaganonema dongi	Wichard, Espeland & Wang	2018	A calamoceratid caddisfly..	
Cretapsychidae	Cretapsyche	Cretapsyche circula	Wichard et al.	2018	A cretapsychid sericostomatoid caddisfly	
Cretapsychidae	Cretapsyche	Cretapsyche elegans	Wichard et al.	2018	A cretapsychid sericostomatoid caddisfly	
Cretapsychidae	Cretapsyche	Cretapsyche insueta	Wichard et al.	2018	A cretapsychid sericostomatoid caddisfly	
Cretapsychidae	Cretapsyche	Cretapsyche kachini	Wichard & Espeland	2022	A cretapsychid sericostomatoid caddisfly	
Cretapsychidae	Cretapsyche	Cretapsyche myanmari	Wichard & Espeland	2022	A cretapsychid sericostomatoid caddisfly	
Cretapsychidae	Cretapsyche	Cretapsyche palpinova	Wichard & Neumann	2019	A cretapsychid sericostomatoid caddisfly	
Helicopsychidae	Cretahelicopsyche	Cretahelicopsyche liuyani	Wichard, Espeland & Wang	2018	A helicopsychid snail-case caddisfly.	
Hydroptilidae	Burminoptila	Burminoptila bemeneha	Botosaneanu	1981	A purse-case caddisfly	
Hydroptilidae	Copulariella	Copulariella ramus	Wang, Engel, Zhang, Shih & Ren in Wang et al.	2024	A purse-case caddisfly	
Hydroptilidae	Cretacoptila	Cretacoptila botosaneanui	Wichard	2020	A purse-case caddisfly	
Lepidochlamidae	Lepidochlamus	Lepidochlamus nodosa	Wang et al.	2022	A lepidochlamid trichopteran.	
Kambaitipsychidae	Myanpsyche	Myanpsyche malaisei	(Wichard & Wang)	2020	A kambaitipsychid caddisly Originally described as Kambaitipsyche malaisei.	
Odontoceridae	Palaeopsilotreta	Palaeopsilotreta burmanica	Wichard et al.	2020	A mortarjoint casemaker caddisfly	Palaeopsilotreta burmanica
Odontoceridae	Palaeopsilotreta	Palaeopsilotreta cretacea	Wichard et al.	2020	A mortarjoint casemaker caddisfly	Palaeopsilotreta cretacea
Odontoceridae	Palaeopsilotreta	Palaeopsilotreta kachini	Wichard, Müller & Xu	2021	A mortarjoint casemaker caddisfly	
Odontoceridae	Palaeopsilotreta	Palaeopsilotreta succini	Wichard, Müller & Xu	2021	A mortarjoint casemaker caddisfly	
Odontoceridae	Palaeopsilotreta	Palaeopsilotreta xiai	Wichard & Wang	2016	A mortarjoint casemaker caddisfly.	Palaeopsilotreta xiai
Odontoceridae	Psilotreta	Psilotreta fossilis	Wichard, Müller & Xu	2021	A species of Psilotreta	
Palleptoceridae	Palleptocerus	Palleptocerus grimaldii	Wichard & Müller	2022		
Palleptoceridae	Palleptocerus	Palleptocerus kuranishii	Wichard	2023		
Philopotamidae	Wormaldia	Wormaldia cercifurcata	Wichard, Müller & Wang	2020	A philopotamid caddisfly.	
Philopotamidae	Wormaldia	Wormaldia cercilonga	Wichard, Müller & Wang	2020	A philopotamid caddisfly.	
Philopotamidae	Wormaldia	Wormaldia cretacea	Wichard & Wang	2016	A finger-net caddisfly.	
Philopotamidae	Wormaldia	Wormaldia denticulata	Wang et al.	2021	A philopotamid caddisfly.	
Philopotamidae	Wormaldia	Wormaldia diplobifurca	Wang et al.	2021	A philopotamid caddisfly.	
Philopotamidae	Wormaldia	Wormaldia myanmari	Wichard & Poinar	2005	A finger-net caddisfly.	
Philopotamidae	Wormaldia	Wormaldia resina	Wichard & Wang	2016	A finger-net caddisfly.	
Philopotamidae	Wormaldia	Wormaldia squamosa	Wichard, Müller & Wang	2020	A finger-net caddisfly.	
Philopotamidae	Wormaldia	Wormaldia transversa	Wichard, Müller & Wang	2020	A finger-net caddisfly.	
Polycentropodidae	Electrocentropus	Electrocentropus dilucidus	Wichard	2020	A polycentropodid caddisfly	
Polycentropodidae	Neucentropus	Neucentropus macularis	(Wang et al.)	2019	A Polycentropodid caddisfly Originally described as Hnamadawgyia macularis.	
Polycentropodidae	Neucentropus	Neucentropus wichardi	Shi et al.	2024	A Polycentropodid caddisfly	
Polycentropodidae	Neureclipsis	Neureclipsis acuta	Wichard & Xu	2022	A polycentropodid caddisfly.	
Polycentropodidae	Neureclipsis	Neureclipsis burmanica	Wichard & Wang	2016	A polycentropodid caddisfly.	
Polycentropodidae	Neureclipsis	Neureclipsis obtusa	Wichard & Xu	2022	A polycentropodid caddisfly.	
Polycentropodidae	Neureclipsis	Neureclipsis triangula	Wichard & Xu	2022	A polycentropodid caddisfly.	
Polycentropodidae	Plectrocnemia	Plectrocnemia bowangi	Wichard & Xu	2022	A polycentropodid caddisfly.	
Polycentropodidae	Plectrocnemia	Plectrocnemia ohlhoffi	Wichard & Xu	2022	A polycentropodid caddisfly.	
Pseudoneureclipsidae	Amberclipsis	Amberclipsis elegans	Wichard, Müller & Fischer	2022	A Pseudoneureclipsidae annulipalpian.	Amberclipsis elegans
Pseudoneureclipsidae	Amberclipsis	Amberclipsis oblongus	Wichard, Müller & Fischer	2022	A Pseudoneureclipsidae annulipalpian.	Amberclipsis oblongus
Pseudoneureclipsidae	Amberclipsis	Amberclipsis simplex	Wichard, Müller & Fischer	2022	A Pseudoneureclipsidae annulipalpian.	Amberclipsis simplex
Psychomyiidae	Paduniella	Paduniella cretacea	Wichard	2023	A psychomyiid caddisfly.	
Xiphocentronidae	Palerasnitsynus	Palerasnitsynus aggregatus	Wang, Engel, Zhang, Shih & Ren in Wang et al.	2024		
Xiphocentronidae	Palerasnitsynus	Palerasnitsynus furcatis	Wichard, Müller & Wang	2018	A xiphocentronid caddisfly.	
Xiphocentronidae	Palerasnitsynus	Palerasnitsynus gracilis	Wichard, Müller & Wang	2018	A xiphocentronid caddisfly.	
Xiphocentronidae	Palerasnitsynus	Palerasnitsynus lepidus	Wichard, Müller & Wang	2018	A xiphocentronid caddisfly.	
Xiphocentronidae	Palerasnitsynus	Palerasnitsynus ohlhoffi	Wichard, Ross, & Ross	2011	A xiphocentronid caddisfly.	Palerasnitsynus ohlhoffi
Xiphocentronidae	Palerasnitsynus	Palerasnitsynus qixi	Wang, Engel, Zhang, Shih & Ren in Wang et al.	2024		
Xiphocentronidae	Palerasnitsynus	Palerasnitsynus queqiaoi	Wang, Engel, Zhang, Shih & Ren in Wang et al.	2024		
Xiphocentronidae	Palerasnitsynus	Palerasnitsynus spinosus	Wichard, Müller & Wang	2018	A xiphocentronid caddisfly.	
Xiphocentronidae	Palerasnitsynus	Palerasnitsynus subgrandis	Wichard, Müller & Wang	2018	A xiphocentronid caddisfly.	
Xiphocentronidae	Palerasnitsynus	Palerasnitsynus subglobolus	Wichard, Müller & Wang	2018	A xiphocentronid caddisfly.	
Xiphocentronidae	Palerasnitsynus	Palerasnitsynus sukatchevae	Wichard, Müller & Wang	2018	A xiphocentronid caddisfly.	
Xiphocentronidae	Palerasnitsynus	Palerasnitsynus vilarinoi	Wichard	2023	A xiphocentronid caddisfly.	
Xiphocentronidae	Palerasnitsynus	Palerasnitsynus vulgaris	Wichard, Müller & Wang	2018	A psychomyiid caddisfly.	
Xiphocentronidae	Palerasnitsynus	Palerasnitsynus xiuqiu	Wang, Engel, Zhang, Shih & Ren in Wang et al.	2024		
incertae sedis	Protoclipsis	Protoclipsis picteti	Wichard, Müller & Fischer	2022	A Psychomyiodea annulipalpian.	Protoclipsis picteti
incertae sedis	Protoclipsis	Protoclipsis roeseli	Wichard, Müller & Fischer	2022	A Psychomyiodea annulipalpian.	Protoclipsis roeseli
incertae sedis	Protoclipsis	Protoclipsis ulmeri	Wichard, Müller & Fischer	2022	A Psychomyiodea annulipalpian.	Protoclipsis ulmeri

== Clade Antliophora ==
=== Diptera ===
Family	Genus	Species	Authority	Year described	Notes	image
Acroceridae	Burmophilopota	Burmophilopota wintertoni	Feng et al.	2024	A member of the family Acroceridae probably belonging to the stem group of Philopotinae.	
Acroceridae	Schlingeromyia	Schlingeromyia minuta	Grimaldi & Hauser	2011	An Acrocerinae small headed fly	Schlingeromyia minuta
Anisopodidae	Cretolbia	Cretolbia burmitica	Kania et al.	2019	A wood gnat.	
Anisopodidae	Cretolbia	Cretolbia hukawnga	Kania et al.	2019	A wood gnat.	
Anisopodidae	Cretolbia	Cretolbia zhuodei	Kania et al.	2019	A wood gnat.	
Anisopodidae	Mycetobia	Mycetobia myanmara	Kania, Wojtoń & Krzemiński	2019	A Mycetobiinae wood gnat.	
Apsilocephalidae	Burmapsilocephala	Burmapsilocephala cockerelli	Gaimari & Mostovski	2000	An apsilocephalid fly.	
Apsilocephalidae	Burmapsilocephala	Burmapsilocephala evocoa	Grimaldi	2016	An apsilocephalid fly.	
Apsilocephalidae	Cascomixticus	Cascomixticus tubuliferous	Poinar & Vega	2021	A member of the family Apsilocephalidae.	
Apsilocephalidae	Creapsilocephala	Creapsilocephala nagatomii	Feng et al.	2024	A member of the family Apsilocephalidae.	
Apsilocephalidae	Irwinimyia	Irwinimyia spinosa	Zhang et al.	2018	An apsilocephalid fly.	
Apsilocephalidae	Kuhwahldyia	Kuhwahldyia indefinita	Solórzano Kraemer & Cumming	2019	An Apsilocephalidae relative.	
Apsilocephalidae	Kuhwahldyia	Kumaromyia burmitica	Grimaldi & Hauser	2011	An apsilocephalid fly.	Kumaromyia burmitica
Apsilocephalidae	Myanmarpsilocephala	Myanmarpsilocephala grimaldii	Zhang et al.	2018	An apsilocephalid fly.	
Apsilocephalidae	Protapsilocephala	Protapsilocephala longisetosa	Feng et al.	2026	An apsilocephalid.	
Apystomyiidae	Hilarimorphites	Hilarimorphites burmitica	Grimaldi & Cumming	2011	An apystomyiid fly.	Hilarimorphites burmanica
Apystomyiidae	Hilarimorphites	Hilarimorphites cummingi	Grimaldi	2016	An apystomyiid fly.	
Archizelmiridae	Burmazelmira	Burmazelmira aristica	Grimaldi, Amorim & Blagoderov	2003	An Archizelmirid fly.	
Asilidae	Burmapogon	Burmapogon bruckschi	Dikow & Grimaldi	2014	An assassin fly	
Atelestidae	Alavesia	Alavesia angusta	Sinclair & Grimaldi	2020	An atelestid fly.	
Atelestidae	Alavesia	Alavesia brevipennae	Sinclair & Grimaldi	2020	An atelestid fly.	
Atelestidae	Alavesia	Alavesia lanceolata	Sinclair & Grimaldi	2020	An atelestid fly.	
Atelestidae	Alavesia	Alavesia latala	Sinclair & Grimaldi	2020	An atelestid fly.	
Atelestidae	Alavesia	Alavesia longicornuta	Sinclair & Grimaldi	2020	An atelestid fly.	
Atelestidae	Alavesia	Alavesia longistylata	Zhang & Wang in Zhang et al.	2020	An atelestid fly.	
Atelestidae	Alavesia	Alavesia magna	Sinclair & Grimaldi	2020	An atelestid fly.	
Atelestidae	Alavesia	Alavesia myanmarensis	Jouault et al.	2020	An atelestid fly.	
Atelestidae	Alavesia	Alavesia pankowskiorum	Sinclair & Grimaldi	2020	An atelestid fly.	
Atelestidae	Alavesia	Alavesia spinosa	Sinclair & Grimaldi	2020	An atelestid fly.	
Atelestidae	Alavesia	Alavesia tripudii	Zhang et al.	2020	An atelestid fly.	
Atelestidae	Alavesia	Alavesia wimpala	Stark et al.	2020	An atelestid fly.	
Atelestidae	Alavesia	Alavesia zigrasi	Sinclair & Grimaldi	2020	An atelestid fly.	
Atelestidae	Neoalavesia	Neoalavesia hadroceria	Poinar & Vega	2020	An atelestid fly.	
Atelestidae	Promeghyperus	Promeghyperus hirtus	Zhang, Shih, Ren & Wang	2024	An atelestid fly.	
Atelestidae	Promeghyperus	Promeghyperus muricicaudatus	Zhang, Shih, Ren & Wang	2024	An atelestid fly.	
Bibionidae	Burmahesperinus	Burmahesperinus antennatus	Ševčík et al.	2021	A member of the family Bibionidae.	
Bibionidae	Burmahesperinus	Burmahesperinus conicus	Ševčík et al.	2021	A member of the family Bibionidae.	
Bibionidae	Burmahesperinus	Burmahesperinus pedicellatus	Ševčík et al.	2021	A member of the family Bibionidae.	
Bibionidae	Cascoplecia	Cascoplecia gracilis	Skartveit	2026	A bibionid	
Bibionidae	Cascoplecia	Cascoplecia insolitis	Poinar	2010	A bibionid	Cascoplecia insolitis
Bibionidae	Cascoplecia	Cascoplecia tridens	Skartveit	2026	A bibionid	
Bibionidae	Cretobibio	Cretobibio burmiticus	Skartveit	2023	A bibionid fly.	
Bibionidae	Cretpenthetria	Cretpenthetria burmensis	Li, Zhang & Xiao	2021	A member of the family Bibionidae.	
Bibionidae	Protodilophus	Protodilophus semispinosus	Skartveit	2023	A bibionid fly.	
Blephariceridae	Zwickina	Zwickina minaevi	Lukashevich & Vorontsov	2022	A blepharicerid fly.	
Bombyliidae	Cretabombylia	Cretabombylia spinifera	Ye et al.	2019	A bee fly.	
Bombyliidae	Endymiomyia	Endymiomyia quadra	Grimaldi	2016	A bee fly.	
Bombyliidae	Nealimyia	Nealimyia evenhuisi	Grimaldi	2016	A bee fly.	
Bombyliidae	Nidergasia	Nidergasia neraudeaui	Ngô-Muller et al.	2020	A bee fly.	
Bombyliidae	Paleocytherea	Paleocytherea pouilloni	Ngô-Muller et al.	2020	A bee fly.	
Bombyliidae	Peculibombylia	Peculibombylia relictivena	Ye et al.	2019	A bee fly.	
Bombyliidae	Pioneeria	Pioneeria bombylia	Grimaldi	2016	A bee fly.	
Bombyliidae	Procrocidium	Procrocidium minutum	Grimaldi	2016	A bee fly.	
Bombyliidae	Similipioneeria	Similipioneeria mirantenna	Ye et al.	2019	A bee fly.	
Cecidomyiidae	Ganseriella	Ganseriella pankowskiorum	Fedotova & Perkovsky	2017	A Diallactiini porricondyline gall midge.	
Cecidomyiidae	Winnertzia	Winnertzia burmitica	(Cockerell)	1917	a Winnertziini gall midge. First described as "Winnertziola" burmitica.	
Ceratopogonidae	Archiaustroconops	Archiaustroconops andersoni	(Szadziewski, Ross & Giłka)	2015	A biting midge. Originally described as "Archiculicoides" andersoni.	
Ceratopogonidae	Archiaustroconops	Archiaustroconops gracilis	Szadziewski & Poinar	2005	A biting midge.	
Ceratopogonidae	Archiaustroconops	Archiaustroconops kotejai	Szadziewski & Poinar	2005	A biting midge.	
Ceratopogonidae	Archiculicoides	Archiculicoides burmiticus	(Szadziewski & Poinar)	2005	A biting midge. Originally described as "Adelohelea" burmitica, moved from "Protoculicoides" burmiticus.	
Ceratopogonidae	Atriculicoides	Atriculicoides swinhoei	(Cockerell)	1919	A biting midge. Originally described as "Johannsenomyia" swinhoei Moved from "Protoculicoides" swinhoei	
Ceratopogonidae	Austroconops	Austroconops asiaticus	Szadziewski	2004	A biting midge.	
Ceratopogonidae	Leptoconops	Leptoconops burmiticus	Szadziewski	2004	A ceratopogonid midge	
Ceratopogonidae	Leptoconops	Leptoconops ellenbergeri	Szadziewski in Szadziewski, Giłka & Urbanek	2015	A ceratopogonid midge	
Ceratopogonidae	Leptoconops	Leptoconops myanmaricus	Szadziewski	2004	A ceratopogonid midge	
Ceratopogonidae	Leptoconops	Leptoconops nosopheris	Poinar	2008	A ceratopogonid midge, host for Paleotrypanosoma burmanicus	Leptoconops nosopheris
Ceratopogonidae	Leptoconops	Leptoconops rossi	Szadziewski	2004	A ceratopogonid midge	
Ceratopogonidae	Leptoconops	Leptoconops subrossicus	Szadziewski & Poinar	2005	A ceratopogonid midge	
Ceratopogonidae	Burmahelea	Burmahelea neli	Szadziewski & Sontag in Szadziewski et al.	2019	An Atriculicoidini biting midge.	
Ceratopogonidae	Culicoides	Culicoides bojarskii	Szadziewski & Dominiak in Szadziewski et al.	2019	A biting midge.	
Ceratopogonidae	Culicoides	Culicoides burmiticus	Szadziewski & Dominiak in Szadziewski et al.	2019	A biting midge.	
Ceratopogonidae	Culicoides	Culicoides ellenbergeri	Szadziewski & Dominiak in Szadziewski et al.	2019	A biting midge.	
Ceratopogonidae	Culicoides	Culicoides myanmaricus	Szadziewski & Dominiak in Szadziewski et al.	2019	A biting midge.	
Ceratopogonidae	Nelohelea	Nelohelea neli	Szadziewski & Sontag in Szadziewski et al.	2019	A Ceratopogonini biting midge.	
Ceratopogonidae	Protoculicoides	Protoculicoides revelatus	Borkent	2019	A biting midge.	
Chaoboridae	Chaoburmus	Chaoburmus breviusculus	Lukashevitch	2000	A phantom midge.	
Chaoboridae	Chaoburmus	?Chaoburmus victimaartis	Lukashevitch	2000	A possible phantom midge.	
Chimeromyiidae	Chimeromyia	Chimeromyia burmitica	Grimaldi & Cumming	2009	A chimeromyiid eremoneuran fly	
Chironomidae	Burmochlus	Burmochlus madmaxi	Giłka, Zakrzewska & Makarchenko	2020	A Podonominae chironomid	
Chironomidae	Furcobuchonomyia	Furcobuchonomyia pankowskii	Giłka & Zakrzewska	2017	A Buchonomyiinae chironomid midge.	
Chironomidae	Furcobuchonomyia	Furcobuchonomyia saetheri	Baranov, Góral & Ross	2017	A Buchonomyiinae chironomid midge.	
Chironomidae	Myanmaro	Myanmaro primus	Giłka et al.	2019	An orthoclad midge.	
Chironomidae	Palaeocentron	Palaeocentron krzeminskii	Giłka, Zakrzewska, Lukashevich & Cranston in Giłka et al.	2021	A pseudochironomine chironomine midge.	
Corethrellidae	Corethrella	Corethrella andersoni	Poinar & Szadziewski	2007	A frog-biting midge.	
Corethrellidae	Corethrella	Corethrella patula	Baranov et al.	2019	A frog-biting midge.	
Diadocidiidae	Docidiadia	Docidiadia burmitica	Blagoderov & Grimaldi	2004	A diadocidiid fly.	
Diadocidiidae	Docidiadia	Docidiadia grimaldii	Amorim & Brown	2022	A diadocidiid fly.	
Deuterophlebiidae	Cretodeuterophlebia	Cretodeuterophlebia courtneyi	Krzemiński, Skibińska & Kopeć	2024	A deuterophlebiid fly.	
Deuterophlebiidae	Protodeuterophlebia	Protodeuterophlebia oosterbroeki	Krzemiński, Krzemińska & Soszyńska	2024	A deuterophlebiid fly.	
Dolichopodidae	Electrochoreutes	Electrochoreutes electroechinus	Badano et al.	2023	A member of the stem group of Dolichopodidae.	
Dolichopodidae	Electrochoreutes	Electrochoreutes falculigerus	Badano et al.	2023	A member of the stem group of Dolichopodidae.	
Dolichopodidae	Electrochoreutes	Electrochoreutes furcillatus	Badano et al.	2023	A member of the stem group of Dolichopodidae.	
Dolichopodidae	Electrochoreutes	Electrochoreutes hamatus	Badano et al.	2023	A member of the stem group of Dolichopodidae.	
Dolichopodidae	Electrochoreutes	Electrochoreutes pankowskii	Badano et al.	2023	A member of the stem group of Dolichopodidae.	
Dolichopodidae	Electrochoreutes	Electrochoreutes planitibia	Badano et al.	2023	A member of the stem group of Dolichopodidae.	
Dolichopodidae	Electrochoreutes	Electrochoreutes trisetigerus	Badano et al.	2023	A member of the stem group of Dolichopodidae.	
Dolichopodidae	Microphorites	Microphorites complanipedis	Zhang & Wang in Zhang et al.	2025	A microphorine long legged fly.	
Dolichopodidae	Microphorites	Microphorites curtipedis	Zhang & Wang in Zhang et al.	2025	A microphorine long legged fly.	
Dolichopodidae	Microphorites	Microphorites hamataculeus	Zhang & Wang in Zhang et al.	2025	A microphorine long legged fly.	
Dolichopodidae	Microphorites	Microphorites pouilloni	Ngô-Muller et al.	2020	A microphorine long legged fly.	
Dolichopodidae	Pristinmicrophor	Pristinmicrophor hukawngensis	Tang et al.	2019	A microphorine long legged fly.	
Dolichopodidae	Schistostoma	Schistostoma burmanicum	Brooks, Cumming & Grimaldi	2019	A microphorine long legged fly.	
Dolichopodidae	Schistostoma	Schistostoma foliatum	Brooks, Cumming & Grimaldi	2019	A microphorine long legged fly.	
Culicidae	Burmaculex	Burmaculex antiquus	Borkent & Grimaldi	2004	A Burmaculicinae mosquito	
Culicidae	Burmaculex	Burmaculex edwardsi	Szadziewski et al.	2024	A Burmaculicinae mosquito	
Culicidae	Burmaculex	Burmaculex harbachi	Szadziewski et al.	2024	A Burmaculicinae mosquito	
Culicidae	Burmaculex	Burmaculex porczynskii	Szadziewski et al.	2024	A Burmaculicinae mosquito	
Culicidae	Priscoculex	Priscoculex burmanicus	Poinar, Zavortink & Brown	2019	An Anophelinae mosquito.	
Empididae	Burmitempis	Burmitempis halteralis	Cockerell	1917	A dagger fly.	
Eremochaetidae	Zhenia	Zhenia burmensis	Zhang & Zhang	2019	An eremochaetid fly.	
Eremochaetidae	Zhenia	Zhenia xiai	Zhang et al.	2016	An eremochaetid fly.	
Hybotidae	Electrocyrtoma	Electrocyrtoma burmanicum	Cockerell	1917	A Tachydromiinae dance fly.	
Hybotidae	Pouillonhybos	Pouillonhybos venator	Ngô-Muller et al.	2020	An ocydromiine dance fly.	
Ironomyiidae	Macalpinomyia	Macalpinomyia jiewenae	Li & Yeates	2018	An ironomyiid fly.	
Ironomyiidae	Palaeopetia	Palaeopetia dorsalis	Grimaldi	2018	An ironomyiid fly.	
Ironomyiidae	Palaeopetia	Palaeopetia terminus	Grimaldi	2018	An ironomyiid fly.	
Ironomyiidae	Proironia	Proironia burmitica	Grimaldi	2018	An ironomyiid fly.	
Ironomyiidae	Proironia	Proironia gibbera	Grimaldi	2018	An ironomyiid fly.	
Keroplatidae	Adamacrocera	Adamacrocera adami	Ševčík, Krzemiński & Skibińska	2020	A keroplatid fly.	
Keroplatidae	Burmacrocera	Burmacrocera petiolata	Cockerell	1917	A fungus gnat	
Keroplatidae	Vladelektra	Vladelektra blagoderovi	Evenhuis	2020	A keroplatid fly.	
Limoniidae	Aleksiana	Aleksiana lapra	(Podenas & Poinar)	2009	A limoniid crane fly. Originally described as ?Antocha lapra.	
Limoniidae	Aleksiana	Aleksiana rasnitsyni	Krzemiński et al.	2021	A limoniid crane fly.	
Limoniidae	Austrolimnophila	Austrolimnophila joana	Podenas & Poinar	2009	A limoniid crane fly.	
Limoniidae	Burmoptera	Burmoptera azu	Podenas & Poinar	2009	A limoniid crane fly.	
Limoniidae	Chilelimnophila	Chilelimnophila parva	Krzemiński, Kania-Kłosok & Arillo in Krzemiński et al.	2024	A limoniid crane fly.	
Limoniidae	Chilelimnophila	Chilelimnophila wangi	Krzemiński, Kania-Kłosok & Arillo in Krzemiński et al.	2024	A limoniid crane fly.	
Limoniidae	Decessia	Decessia podenasi	Krzemiński et al.	2021	A member of the family Limoniidae.	
Limoniidae	Dicranoptycha	Dicranoptycha burmitica	Kania, Wang & Szwedo	2015	A limoniid crane fly.	
Limoniidae	Dicranoptycha	Dicranoptycha fragmentata	Krzeminski	2004	A Limoniid crane fly.	
Limoniidae	Dicranoptycha	Dicranoptycha plicativa	Gao, Shih & Ren	2016	A Limoniid crane fly.	
Limoniidae	Drinosa	Drinosa prisca	Podenas & Poinar	2009	A limoniid crane fly.	
Limoniidae	Gonomyia	Gonomyia burmitica	Kania-Kłosok et al.	2022	A limoniid cranefly, a species of Gonomyia.	
Limoniidae	Helius	Helius krzeminskii	Ribeiro	2003	A limoniid crane fly.	
Limoniidae	Lebania	Lebania hukawngensis	Men, Hu & Mu	2019	A limoniid cranefly.	
Limoniidae	Lebania	Lebania pilosa	Men, Hu & Mu	2019	A limoniid cranefly.	
Limoniidae	Lebania	Lebania podenasi	Men, Hu & Mu	2019	A limoniid cranefly.	
Limoniidae	Lebania	Lebania scomax	Podenas & Poinar	2009	A limoniid crane fly.	
Limoniidae	Limnophila	Limnophila bora	Podenas & Poinar	2009	A limoniid crane fly.	
Limoniidae	Orimarguloides	Orimarguloides simplex	Men & Podenas	2021	A limoniid crane fly.	
Limoniidae	Pilaria	Pilaria magdalena	Kopeć, Krzemiński & Albrycht	2020	A species of limoniid crane fly.	
Limoniidae	Pilaria	Pilaria wojciechi	Kopeć, Krzemiński & Albrycht	2020	A species of limoniid crane fly.	
Limoniidae	Pseudoerioptera	Pseudoerioptera hubenqii	Men, Hu & Starkevich	2022	A chioneine limoniid crane fly.	
Limoniidae	Rhabdomastix	Rhabdomastix jarzembowskii	Krzeminski	2004	A Limoniid crane fly.	
Limoniidae	Trentepohlia	Trentepohlia dzeura	Podenas & Poinar	2009	A limoniid crane fly.	
Limoniidae	Trichoneura	Trichoneura burmitensis	Kopeć et al.	2023	A species of limoniid crane fly.	
Limoniidae	Trichoneura	Trichoneura chungkuni	Kopeć et al.	2023	A species of limoniid crane fly.	
Limoniidae	Trichoneura	Trichoneura sevciki	Kopeć et al.	2023	A species of limoniid crane fly.	
Limoniidae	Trichoneura	Trichoneura wangi	Kopeć et al.	2023	A species of limoniid crane fly.	
Lygistorrhinidae	Archaeognoriste	Archaeognoriste primitiva	Blagoderov & Grimaldi	2004	A long beaked fungus gnat	
Lygistorrhinidae	Leptognoriste	Leptognoriste davisi	Blagoderov & Grimaldi	2004	A long beaked fungus gnat	
Lygistorrhinidae	Leptognoriste	Leptognoriste microstoma	Blagoderov & Grimaldi	2004	A long beaked fungus gnat	
Lygistorrhinidae	Protognoriste	Protognoriste goeleti	Blagoderov & Grimaldi	2004	A long beaked fungus gnat	
Lygistorrhinidae	Protognoriste	Protognoriste nascifoa	Blagoderov & Grimaldi	2004	A long beaked fungus gnat	
Mycetophilidae	Alavamanota	Alavamanota burmitina	Blagoderov & Grimaldi	2004	A fungus gnat.	
Mycetophilidae	Allocotocera	Allocotocera burmitica	Blagoderov & Grimaldi	2004	A fungus gnat.	
Mycetophilidae	Disparoleia	Disparoleia cristata	Blagoderov & Grimaldi	2004	A fungus gnat.	
Mycetophilidae	Gaalomyia	Gaalomyia carolinae	Blagoderov & Grimaldi	2004	A fungus gnat.	
Mycetophilidae	Hemolia	Hemolia glabra	Blagoderov & Grimaldi	2004	A fungus gnat.	
Mycetophilidae	Hemolia	Hemolia matilei	Blagoderov & Grimaldi	2004	A fungus gnat.	
Mycetophilidae	Protragoneura	Protragoneura platycera	Blagoderov & Grimaldi	2004	A fungus gnat.	
Mycetophilidae	Pseudomanota	Pseudomanota perplexa	Blagoderov & Grimaldi	2004	A fungus gnat.	
Mycetophilidae	"Sciara"	"Sciara" burmitina	Cockerell	1917	A dark-winged fungus gnat	
Mycetophilidae	Temaleia	Temaleia birmitica	Blagoderov & Grimaldi	2004	A fungus gnat.	
Mycetophilidae	Zeliinia	Zeliinia orientalis	Blagoderov & Grimaldi	2004	A fungus gnat.	
Mysteromyiidae	Mysteromyia	Mysteromyia plumosa	Grimaldi	2016	A Mysteromyiid orthorrhaphan fly.	
Mythicomyiidae	Microburmyia	Microburmyia analvena	Grimaldi & Cumming	2011	A mythicomyiid fly.	Microburmyia analven
Mythicomyiidae	Microburmyia	Microburmyia veanalvena	Grimaldi & Cumming	2011	A mythicomyiid fly.	Microburmyia venanalvena
Nemestrinidae	Hirmoneura	Hirmoneura burmanica	Liu & Huang	2019	A tangle-veined fly.	
Nemestrinidae	Hirmoneura	Hirmoneura caudiprima	Grimaldi	2016	A tangle-veined fly.	
Nemestrinidae	Hirmoneura	Hirmoneura mostovskii	Liu & Huang	2019	A tangle-veined fly.	
Nemestrinidae	Hirmoneura	Hirmoneura zigrasi	Grimaldi	2016	A tangle-veined fly.	
Nemestrinidae	Mesonemestrius	Mesonemestrius caii	Zhang, Zhang & Wang	2017	An Archinemestriinae tangle-veined fly.	
Nymphomyiidae	Nymphomyia	Nymphomyia allissae	Wagner & Müller	2020	A nymphomyiid fly.	
Phoridae	Prophora	Prophora dimorion	Grimaldi	2018	A phorid fly.	
Platypezidae	Burmapeza	Burmapeza radicis	Grimaldi		A platypezid fly.	
Platypezidae	Calvopeza	Calvopeza divergens	Grimaldi	2018	A platypezid fly.	
Platypezidae	Chandleromyia	Chandleromyia anomala	Grimaldi	2018	A Platypezid fly.	
Pleciofungivoridae	Cretopleciofungivora	Cretopleciofungivora simpsoni	Zhang et al.	2024	A pleciofungivorid bibionomorph fly.	
Psychodidae	Axenotrichomyia	Axenotrichomyia boisteli	Azar et al.	2015	A trichomyiine drain fly. The type species is Axenotrichomyia .	
Psychodidae	Bamara	Bamara groehni	Stebner et al.	2015	A drain fly.	Bamara groehni
Psychodidae	Datzia	Datzia bispina	Stebner et al.	2015	A drain fly.	Datzia bispina
Psychodidae	Datzia	Datzia setosa	Stebner et al.	2015	A drain fly.	Datzia setosa
Psychodidae	Eophlebotomus	Eophlebotomus connectens	Cockerell	1920	A drain fly	
Psychodidae	Mandalayia	Mandalayia beumersorum	Stebner et al.	2015	A drain fly.	Mandalayia beumersorum
Psychodidae	Palaeoglaesum	Palaeoglaesum angustum	Skibińska & Santos	2023	A Bruchomyiinae drain fly.	
Psychodidae	Palaeoglaesum	Palaeoglaesum bisulcum	Wagner	2017	A Bruchomyiinae drain fly.	
Psychodidae	Palaeoglaesum	Palaeoglaesum carsteni	Skibińska, Krzemiński & Zhang	2019	A Bruchomyiinae drain fly.	
Psychodidae	Palaeoglaesum	Palaeoglaesum cracoviae	Skibińska & Santos	2023	A Bruchomyiinae drain fly.	
Psychodidae	Palaeoglaesum	Palaeoglaesum gregi	Skibińska & Krzemiński in Skibińska et al.	2023	A Bruchomyiinae drain fly.	
Psychodidae	Palaeoglaesum	Palaeoglaesum jakubi	Skibińska et al.	2023	A Bruchomyiinae drain fly.	
Psychodidae	Palaeoglaesum	Palaeoglaesum muelleri	Wagner	2017	A Bruchomyiinae drain fly.	
Psychodidae	Palaeoglaesum	Palaeoglaesum myanmari	Skibińska et al.	2023	A Bruchomyiinae drain fly.	
Psychodidae	Palaeoglaesum	Palaeoglaesum notandum	Wagner	2017	A Bruchomyiinae drain fly.	
Psychodidae	Palaeoglaesum	Palaeoglaesum pilosus	Skibińska, Krzemiński & Zhang in Skibińska et al.	2021	A bruchomyiine drain fly.	
Psychodidae	Palaeoglaesum	Palaeoglaesum quadrispiculatum	(Stebner et al.)	2015	A Bruchomyiinae drain fly. Originally described as "Nemopalpus" quadrispiculatus	Palaeoglaesum quadrispiculatum
Psychodidae	Palaeoglaesum	Palaeoglaesum stebneri	Skibińska & Krzemiński in Skibińska et al.	2021	A bruchomyiine drain fly.	
Psychodidae	Palaeoglaesum	Palaeoglaesum teres	Skibińska & Albrycht in Skibińska et al.	2021	A bruchomyiine drain fly.	
Psychodidae	Palaeoglaesum	Palaeoglaesum velteni	(Wagner)	2012	A Bruchomyiinae drain fly. Originally described as "Nemopalpus" velteni.	
Psychodidae	Palaeoglaesum	Palaeoglaesum wagneri	Skibińska, Krzemiński & Zhang	2019	A Bruchomyiinae drain fly.	
Psychodidae	Palaeomyia	Palaeomyia burmitis	Poinar	2004	A Phlebotomidae sand fly, host for Paleoleishmania proterus	Palaeomyia burmitis
Psychodidae	Palaeoparasycorax	Palaeoparasycorax globosus	Stebner et al.	2015	A drain fly.	Palaeoparasycorax globosus
Psychodidae	Palaeoparasycorax	Palaeoparasycorax suppus	Stebner et al.	2015	A drain fly.	Palaeoparasycorax suppus
Psychodidae	Parasycorax	Parasycorax simplex	Stebner et al.	2015	A drain fly.	Parasycorax simplex
Psychodidae	Phlebotomites	Phlebotomites aphoe	Stebner et al.	2015	A drain fly.	Phlebotomites aphoe
Psychodidae	Phlebotomites	Phlebotomites burmaticus	Malak, Salamé & Azar	2013	A drain fly.	
Psychodidae	Phlebotomites	Phlebotomites grimaldii	Malak, Salamé & Azar	2013	A drain fly.	
Psychodidae	Phlebotomites	Phlebotomites neli	Malak, Salamé & Azar	2013	A drain fly.	
Psychodidae	Phlebotomus	Phlebotomus vetus	Stebner et al.	2015	A drain fly.	Phlebotomus vetus
Psychodidae	Protohoraiella	Protohoraiella katerinae	Curler, Krzemiński & Skibińska	2019	A Horaiellinae drain fly.	
Psychodidae	Protohoraiella	Protohoraiella yvonnae	Curler, Krzemiński & Skibińska	2019	A Horaiellinae drain fly.	
Trichomyia	"Trichomya" swinhoei	Cockerell	1917	A Sycoracinae drain fly		
Ptychopteridae	Leptychoptera	Leptychoptera calva	Lukashevich	2004	A phantom crane fly.	
Ptychopteridae	Leptychoptera	Leptychoptera reburra	Lukashevich	2004	A phantom crane fly.	
Rhagionemestriidae	Burminemestrinus	Burminemestrinus qiyani	Zhang, Zhang & Wang	2020	A rhagionemestriid fly.	
Rhagionemestriidae	Cretinemestrimus	Cretinemestrimus eurema	Grimaldi	2016	A rhagionemestriid fly first described as "Jurassinemestrinus" eurema	
Rhagionemestriidae	Viriosinemestrius	Viriosinemestrius mai	Zhang, Zhang & Wang	2020	A rhagionemestriid fly.	
Scatopsidae	Hoploscatopse	Hoploscatopse prisca	Haenni & Ševčík	2022	A scatopsid fly.	
Scenopinidae	Burmaprorates	Burmaprorates alagracilis	Jouault & Nel	2020	A window fly.	
Stratiomyidae	Lysistrata	Lysistrata burmensis	Liu, Cai & Huang	2017	A soldier fly.	
Stratiomyidae	Narcissomyia	Narcissomyia bella	Grimaldi	2016	A soldier fly.	
Stratiomyidae	Normyia longistyli	Grimaldi	2016	A soldier fly.		
Stratiomyidae	Normyia longistyli	Normyia telescopica	Grimaldi	2016	A soldier fly.	
Stratiomyidae	Normyia longistyli	Normyia woodleyi	Grimaldi	2016	A soldier fly.	
Syrphidae	Prosyrphus	Prosyrphus thompsoni	Grimaldi	2018	A possible stem-hoverfly.	
Tabanidae	Cratotabanus	Cratotabanus asiaticus	Grimaldi	2016	A Horse-fly.	
Tabanidae	Tabanipriscus	Tabanipriscus transitivus	Grimaldi	2016	A Horse fly.	
Tanyderidae	Dacochile	Dacochile browni	Skibińska & Krzemiński	2018	A primitive crane fly.	
Tanyderidae	Dacochile	Dacochile microsoma	Poinar & Brown	2004	A primitive crane fly.	
Tanyderidae	Dacochile	Dacochile poinari	Skibińska & Krzemiński	2018	A primitive crane fly.	
Tanyderidae	Espanoderus	Espanoderus orientalis	Men, Hu & Xu	2020	A tanyderid primitive crane fly.	
Tanyderidae	Similinannotanyderus	Similinannotanyderus lii	Dong, Shih & Ren	2015	A tanyderid primitive crane fly	
Tanyderidae	Similinannotanyderus	Similinannotanyderus longitergata	Men, Hu & Xu	2020	A tanyderid primitive crane fly	
Tanyderidae	Similinannotanyderus	Similinannotanyderus zbigniewi	Skibińska & Krzemiński	2018	A tanyderid primitive crane fly	
Tethepomyiidae	Tethepomyia	Tethepomyia coxa	Grimaldi	2016	An Archisargoidea tethepomyiid fly.	
Tethepomyiidae	Tethepomyia	Tethepomyia zigrasi	Grimaldi & Arillo	2011	An Archisargoidea tethepomyiid fly.	Tethepomyia zigrasi
Tipulidae	Leptotarsus	Leptotarsus burmica	Men & Hu	2020	A crane fly.	
Valeseguyidae	Cretoseguya	Cretoseguya burmitica	Amorim & Grimaldi	2006	A Valeseguyid fly.	
Xylomyidae	Archeoxyla	Archeoxyla gigantea	Han et al.	2022	A xylomyid fly.	
Xylomyidae	Archosolva	Archosolva biceps	Grimaldi	2016	A wood soldier fly.	
Xylomyidae	Archosolva	Archosolva sulcata	Grimaldi	2016	A wood soldier fly.	
Xylomyidae	Clemoxyla	Clemoxyla aculeolata	Han et al.	2022	A xylomyid fly.	
Xylomyidae	Cretarthropeina	Cretarthropeina perdita	Solórzano Kraemer & Cumming	2019	A wood soldier fly.	
Xylomyidae	Cretasolva	Cretasolva burmitica	Grimaldi	2016	A wood soldier fly.	
Xylomyidae	Pankowskia	Pankowskia primera	Solórzano Kraemer & Cumming	2019	A wood soldier fly.	
Zhangsolvidae	Burmomyia	Burmomyia rossi	Zhang et al.	2019	A stratiomyomorph zhangsolvid fly.	
Zhangsolvidae	Cratomyia	Cratomyia mimetica	Grimaldi	2016	A stratiomyomorph zhangsolvid fly.	
Zhangsolvidae	Cratomyia	Cratomyia zhuoi	Zhang et al.	2019	A stratiomyomorph zhangsolvid fly.	
Zhangsolvidae	Linguatormyia	Linguatormyia teletacta	Grimaldi in Arillo et al.	2015	A zhangsolvid stratiomyomorph fly.	
Incertae sedis	Aschizomyia	Aschizomyia burmensis	Grimaldi	2018	A syrphoid fly.	
Incertae sedis	Atherhagiox	Atherhagiox ambiguum	Grimaldi	2016	A (probably) basal tabanomorph fly.	
Incertae sedis	Atherhagiox	Atherhagiox simulans	Grimaldi	2016	A (probably) basal tabanomorph fly.	
Incertae sedis	Burmacyrtus	Burmacyrtus rusmithi	Grimaldi & Hauser	2011	A brachyceran fly of uncertain placement	Burmacyrtus rusmithi
Incertae sedis	Eucaudomyia	Eucaudomyia longicerci	Grimaldi	2016	A non-empidoid orthorrhaphan fly of uncertain placement.	
Incertae sedis	Galloatherix	Galloatherix completus	Grimaldi	2016	A (probably) basal tabanomorph.	
Incertae sedis	Gracilomyia	Gracilomyia wit	Grimaldi	2016	A non-empidoid orthorrhaphan fly of uncertain placement.	
Incertae sedis	Lebambromyia	Lebambromyia sacculifera	Badano, Zhang, Yeates & Cerretti in Badano et al.	2021	A member of Phoroidea.	
Incertae sedis	Lonchopterites	Lonchopterites burmensis	Grimaldi	2018	A stem lonchopteroid fly.	
Incertae sedis	Myanmyia	Myanmyia asteiformia	Grimaldi	2011	A brachyceran fly of uncertain placement.	Myanmyia asteiformia
Incertae sedis	Palaepangonius	Palaepangonius glossa	Grimaldi	2016	A (probably) basal tabanomorph fly.	
Incertae sedis	Pseudorhagio	Pseudorhagio zhangi	Zhang, Zhang & Wang	2016	A tabanomorph fly of uncertain phylogenetic placement.	
Incertae sedis	Psilocephala	Psilocephala electrella	Cockerell	1920	A fly of uncertain placement.	

=== Mecoptera ===
Family	Genus	Species	Authority	Year described	Notes	image
†Aneuretopsychidae	†Burmopsyche	†Burmopsyche bella	Zhao et al.	2020	An aneuretopsychid scorpionfly	Burmopsyche bella
†Aneuretopsychidae	†Burmopsyche	†Burmopsyche xiai	Zhao et al.	2020	An aneuretopsychid scorpionfly	Burmopsyche xiai
Bittacidae	Bittacus	†Bittacus lepiduscretaceus	Li et al.	2018	A bittacid hangingfly	
Bittacidae	†Burmobittacus	†Burmobittacus jarzembowskii	Zhao et al.	2016	A bittacid hangingfly	
Eomeropidae	†Burmothauma	Burmothauma eureka	Zhang et al.	2022	A member of the family Eomeropidae.	
Meropeidae	†Burmomerope	†Burmomerope bashkuevi	Sun et al.	2020	An earwig fly.	
Meropeidae	†Burmomerope	†Burmomerope clara	Zhao & Wang in Zhao et al.	2016	An earwig fly.	
Meropeidae	†Burmomerope	†Burmomerope eureka	Grimaldi & Engel	2013	An earwig fly.	
Meropeidae	†Torvimerope	†Torvimerope cordatus	Zhang et al.	2024	An earwig fly.	
†Orthophlebiidae	†Burmorthophlebia	Burmorthophlebia macularis	Zhang et al.	2022	A member of the family Orthophlebiidae.	
†Orthophlebiidae	†Burmorthophlebia	Burmorthophlebia multiprocessa	Soszyńska-Maj, Krzemiński & Wang in Soszyńska-Maj et al.	2022	A member of the family Orthophlebiidae.	
†Pseudopolycentropodidae	†Dualula	†Dualula kachinensis	Lin et al.	2019	A pseudopolycentropodid scorpionfly	Dualula kachinensis
†Pseudopolycentropodidae	†Parapolycentropus	†Parapolycentropus burmiticus	Grimaldi & Rasnitsyn	2005	A pseudopolycentropodid scorpionfly	Parapolycentropus burmiticus
†Pseudopolycentropodidae	†Parapolycentropus	†Parapolycentropus paraburmiticus	Grimaldi & Rasnitsyn	2005	A pseudopolycentropodid scorpionfly	Parapolycentropus paraburmiticus (copulating)

== Clade Archaeorthoptera ==
=== Orthoptera ===
Taxon	Authority	Year described	Notes	image
Amberotridactylus cheni	Du, Xu & Zhang	2021	A tridactylid pygmy mole cricket.	
Apiculatus cretaceus	Yuan, Ma & Gu	2022	An Oecanthinae tree cricket.	
Archaicaripipteryx burmensis	Zhu et al.	2023	A ripipterygid "mud cricket".	
Archaicaripipteryx rotunda	Xu et al.	2020	A ripipterygid "mud cricket".	
Birmaninemobius hirsutus	Xu et al.	2020	A Nemobiinae trigonidiid wood cricket.	
Birmanioecanthus haplostichus	Yuan, Ma & Gu	2022	An Oecanthinae tree cricket.	
Birmitoxya intermedia	Gorochov	2010	A dentridactyline pygmy mole cricket	
Burmadactylus grimaldii	Heads	2009	A mongoloxyine pygmy mole cricket	
Burmadactylus tenuicerci	Fan, Gu & Cao	2023		
Burmagryllotalpa longa	Wang et al.	2020	A gryllotalpine mole cricket	
Burmaripipteryx oblongus	Zhao et al.	2022	A ripipterygid "mud cricket".	
Burmecaelinus armis	Uchida, Husemann & Kotthoff	2023	A member of Caelifera belonging to the family Burmecaelidae.	
Burmelcana longirostris	Peñalver & Grimaldi	2010	An elcanid grasshopper.	
Caelielca spinocrus	Uchida	2021	An elcanid grasshopper.	
Cascogryllus lobiferus	Poinar	2018	A tridactylid pygmy mole cricket.	
Cascogryllus setosus	Du, Xu & Zhang	2021	A tridactylid pygmy mole cricket.	
Chunxiania fania	Xu et al.	2022	A mole cricket or a member of the family Gryllidae or Pseudogryllotalpidae. Possibly a junior synonym of Tresdigitus rectanguli.	
Chunxiania fascia	Gu et al.	2023	Possibly a junior synonym of Chunxiania fania.	
Crassicorpus maculatus	Zheng et al.	2023	A tree cricket.	
Curvospurus huzhengkun	Liu, Yu & He	2022	A trigonidiid wood cricket.	
Elcanonympha diana	Heads, Thomas & Wang	2018	An elcanid grasshopper.	Elcanonympha diana
Ellca nevelka	Kočárek	2020	An elcanid grasshopper.	
Gryllobencain patrickmuelleri	Haug et al.	2022	An ensiferan of uncertain affinities.	
Hukawnelca gracile	Uchida	2021	An elcanid grasshopper.	
Kallosripipteryx zhangi	Zhao et al.	2024	A ripipterygid "mud cricket".	
Latedactylus longapedi	Zheng, Cao & Gu	2023	A pygmy mole cricket.	
Letoelcana artemisapollonque	Schall, Kotthoff & Husemann	2023	An elcanid grasshopper.	
Longioculus burmensis	Poinar, Gorochov & Buckley	2007	An elcanid grasshopper.	
Magnidactylus gracilis	Gu, Zheng, Cao & Yue in Gu et al.	2022		
Magnidactylus mirus	Gu, Zheng, Cao & Yue in Gu et al.	2022		
Magnidactylus robustus	Xu, Fang & Jarzembowski	2020	A tridactylid pygmy mole cricket or a member of the family Ripipterygidae.	
Moban zhengzhemini	Hu & He in Hu, Li & He	2024	A member of Caelifera belonging to the family Burmecaelidae.	
Monitelcana penalveri	Xu et al.	2022	An elcanid.	
Ordicalcaratus inconditus	Zheng et al.	2023	A tree cricket.	
Palaeotrigonidium concavoculus	Gu, Zhou & Yuan	2024	A trigonidiid wood cricket.	
Palaeotrigonidium defectivus	Gu, Zhou & Yuan	2024	A trigonidiid wood cricket.	
Panorpidium maculosum	Zhou et al.	2022	An elcanid.	
Paraxelcana coronakanthodis	Schall, Kotthoff & Husemann	2023	An elcanid grasshopper.	
Paraxya hui	Cao, Chen & Yin	2019	A tridactylid pygmy mole cricket.	
Petilus zhengi	Gu et al.	2023	A member of Ensifera belonging to the family Pseudogryllotalpidae or Gryllidae. Possibly a junior synonym of Pherodactylus micromorphus.	
Pherodactylus micromorphus	Poinar, Su & Brown	2020	A cricket.	
Phyllotridactylus wangi	Xu et al.	2021	A member of the family Tridactylidae.	Phyllotridactylus wangi
Probaisselcana kachinensis	Zhou et al.	2024	An elcanid.	
Probaisselcana oculata	Hu & He	2023	An elcanid.	
Probaisselcana zhengi	Gu et al.	2022	An elcanid.	
Protomogoplistes asquamosus	Gorochov	2010	A protomogoplistine scaley cricket	
Pseudogryllotalpa scalprata	Gu et al.	2023	A member of Ensifera belonging to the family Pseudogryllotalpidae or Gryllidae. Possibly a junior synonym of Pherodactylus micromorphus.	
Qiongqi crinalis	Yuan et al.	2023	A member of the family Trigonidiidae.	
Tresdigitus gracilis	Jiang et al.	2022	A mole cricket or a member of the family Gryllidae. Possibly a junior synonym of Tresdigitus rectanguli.	
Tresdigitus rectanguli	Xu, Fang & Wang	2020	A mole cricket or a member of the family Gryllidae. Possibly a species of Pherodactylus.	
Tricalcaratus longilineus	Gu, Zhou & Yuan	2024	A trigonidiid wood cricket.	
Trigonelca jennywinterae	Schall, Kotthoff & Husemann	2023	An elcanid grasshopper.	
Unidigitus longialatus	Gu et al.	2023	A member of Ensifera belonging to the family Pseudogryllotalpidae or Gryllidae. Possibly a junior synonym of Pherodactylus micromorphus.	

=== Other archaeorthopterans ===
Taxon	Authority	Year described	Notes	image
Chresmoda chikuni	Zhang & Ge in Zhang et al.	2017	A water skater like Chresmodid archaeorthopteran.	
Mantoblatta mira	Gorochov	2006	An orthopteroid polyneopteran of uncertain placement.	

== Clade Coleopterida ==
=== Strepsiptera ===
Taxon	Authority	Year described	Notes	image
Cretostylops engeli	Grimaldi & Kathirithamby	2005	A cretostylopid stem-twisted-wing insect	
Heterobathmilla kakopoios	Pohl & Beutel in Pohl et al.	2020	A phthanoxenid stem-strepsipteran.	
Kinzelbachilla ellenbergeri	Pohl & Beutel	2016	A phthanoxenid stem-twisted-wing insect.	
Phthanoxenos nervosus	Engel & Huang in Engel et al.	2016	A phthanoxenid stem-twisted-wing insect.	

== Clade Dictyoptera ==
=== Blattodea ===
Taxon	Authority	Year described	Notes	image
Aethiocarenus burmanicus	Poinar & Brown	2017	A dictyopteran insect of uncertain placement. Treated as belonging to the order Aethiocarenodea or as an alienopterid nymph.	Aethiocarenus burmanicus
Alienopterella stigmatica	Kočárek	2018	An Alienopterid dictyopteran.	
Alienopterix mlynskyi	Sendi in Vršanský et al.	2021		
Alienopterix ocularis	Mlynský, Vršanský & Wang in Vršanský et al.	2018	An Alienopterid or cratovitismid dictyopteran.	
Alienopterix smidovae	Hinkelman in Vršanský et al.	2021		
Alienopterus brachyelytrus	Bai et al.	2016	An Alienopterid dictyopteran.	
Angustitermes reflexus	Jiang, Zhao & Ren in Jiang et al.	2024	A mastotermitid termite	
Anisotermes bourguignoni	Jouault et al.	2022	A termite belonging to the family Mastotermitidae.	
Anisotermes xiai	Zhao et al.	2019	A termite belonging to the family Mastotermitidae.	
Antophiloblatta hispida	Sendi in Sendi et al.	2020	An umenocoleid or cratovitismid cockroach.	
Arceotermes hospitis	Engel & Jiang in Jiang et al.	2021	An arceotermitid termite	
Archaeospinapteryx tartarensis	Sendi & Cumming in Sendi et al.	2023	An umenocoleid.	
Archeorhinotermes rossi	Krishna & Grimaldi	2003	An archeorhinotermitid termite	
Balatronis cretacea	Šmídová & Lei	2017	A cockroach of uncertain placement.	
Bimodala cretacea	Šmídová in Vršanský et al.	2019	A cockroach of uncertain placement. Originally assigned to the Blattidae; Qiu et al. (2020) transferred it to the family Corydiidae.	
Bubosa poinari	Šmídová	2020	A blattine cockroach.	
Caligoptera hinkelmani	Sendi	2021	An ectobiid cockroach	
Caputoraptor elegans	Bai et al.	2018	An Alienopterid dictyopteran	
Caputoraptor vidit	Šmídová, Vršanský & Wang	2018	An Alienopterid dictyopteran	
Cercoula brachyptera	Li & Huang	2020	A blattoid cockroach.	
Corydoblatta subrotunda	Hinkelman & Vršanský in Vršanský et al.	2022	A corydiid cockroach.	
Cosmotermes multus	Zhao, Yin, Shih & Ren in Zhao et al.	2019	A termite	
Cosmotermes opacus	Zhao, Yin, Shih & Ren in Zhao et al.	2019	A termite	
Cratovitisma bechlyi	Podstrelená in Podstrelená & Sendi	2018		
Crenocticola burmanica	Li & Huang	2020	A stem nocticolid cockroach.	
Crenocticola svadba	Sendi et al.	2020	A stem nocticolid cockroach.	
Cretaperiplaneta kaonashi	Qiu, Che & Wang in Qiu et al.	2020	A Blattidae cockroach.	
Cratovitisma bechlyi	Podstrelená in Podstrelená & Sendi	2018	An umenocoleid cockroach.	
Cuniculoblatta brevialata	Hinkelman	2021		
Dharmatermes avernalis	Engel, Grimaldi & Krishna	2007	A euisopteran termite of uncertain placement.	
Ectoovia protecta	Sendi	2021	An ectobiid cockroach	
Eminespina burma	Chen, Zhang & Shi	2021	An alienopterid.	
Enervipraeala nigra	Luo, Xu & Jarzembowski	2020	An umenocoleid cockroach.	
Facioblatta perfidia	Hinkelman	2022	A liberiblattinid cockroach.	
Formicamendax vrsanskyi	Hinkelman	2019	An Alienopterid dictyopteran	
Fractalia articulata	Hinkelman in Vršanský et al.	2021	A member of Corydioidea belonging to the family Fractaliidae.	
Fragosublatta pectinata	Chen, Shih & Ren in Chen et al.	2021	A corydiid cockroach.	
Ginormotermes rex	(Engel, Barden & Grimaldi)	2016	A termite of uncertain placement. Originally described as "Gigantotermes" rex.	
Huablattula hui	Qiu, Wang & Che	2019	A blattulid cockroach.	
Huablattula jiewenae	Qiu, Wang & Che	2019	A blattulid cockroach.	
Huablattula vrsanskyi	Zhang, Li & Luo	2023	A blattulid cockroach.	
Hypercercoula jiewenae	Qiu	2022	A member of Blattoidea.	
Jantaropterix ellenbergeri	Mlynský, Wu & Koubová	2019		
Kachinitermes tristis	(Cockerell)	1917	A dry wood termite. Originally described as Hodotermes tristis, moved from Kalotermes tristis	
Kachinitermopsis burmensis	(Poinar)	2009	A kalotermitid termite, originally described as "Kalotermes burmensis"	Kachinitermopsis burmensis
Krishnatermes yoddha	Engel, Barden & Grimaldi in Engel et al.	2016	A termite of uncertain placement.	
Latiblattella karlgruberi	Sendi	2021	A species of Latiblattella	
Laticephalana liuyani	Luo et al.	2021	A member of the family Umenocoleidae.	
Longitermes pulcher	Jouault et al.	2022	A termite.	
Maculosala circularis	Xia et al.	2024	A corydiid cockroach.	
Magnifitermes krishnai	Jouault et al.	2022	A termite.	
Magniocula apiculata	Qiu, Wang & Che	2019	A corydiid cockroach.	
Magniocula paradoxona	Vršanská & Vršanský in Vršanský et al.	2022	A corydiid cockroach.	
Manipulatoides obscura	Li & Huang	2022	A manipulatorid cockroach	
Manipulator modificaputis	Vršanský & Bechly	2015	A manipulatorid cockroach	
Mastotermes monostichus	Zhao et al.	2019	A termite, a species of Mastotermes.	
Mastotermes myanmarensis	Jouault et al.	2022	A termite, a species of Mastotermes.	
Mastotermes reticulatus	Jiang, Zhao & Ren in Jiang et al.	2024	A termite, a species of Mastotermes.	
Meilia jinghanae	Vršanský et Wang in Vršanský et al.	2018	An Alienopterid dictyopteran.	
Mesoblatta maxi	Hinkelman in Hinkelman & Vršanská	2020	A Mesoblattinidae cockroach. Host to Chlamydomonas hanublikanus Associated with Blattocoprolites mesoblattamaxi	
Milesitermes engeli	Jouault et al.	2021	A termite belonging to the family Mastotermitidae.	
Mongolblatta sendii	Hinkelman	2021	A member of the family Mesoblattinidae.	
Morphna cretacica	Šmídová, Vidlička & Wedmann	2021	A blaberid cockroach	
Mulleriblattina bowangi	Sendi et al.	2020	A nocticolid cockroach	
Mylacrotermes cordatus	Engel, Grimaldi & Krishna	2007	An eEuisopteran termite of uncertain placement.	
Nadveruzenie postava	Vršanský, Hinkelman & Sendi in Vršanský et al.	2021	An alienopterid.	
Nigropterix cummingi	Sendi	2024	An umenocoleid	
Nodosigalea burmanica	Li & Huang	2018	A corydiid cockroach.	
Nodosigalea simplivena	Šmídová	2021	A corydiid cockroach.	
Obscuroblatta rigida	Hinkelman & Vršanský in Vršanský et al.	2022	A corydiid cockroach.	
Ocelloblattula margarita	Koubová & Vršanský in Vršanský et al.	2021	A member of Corydioidea.	
Okruhliak vedec	Vršanský & Hinkelman in Vršanský et al.	2022	A corydiid cockroach.	
Ol xiai	Vršanský & Wang	2017	An olid cockroach.	
Olenablatta vrsanskyi	Šmídová	2021	An olid cockroach.	
Pabuonqed eulna	Vršanský in Vršanský et al.	2019	An pabuonqedid mastotermitoid.	
Pabuonqed magna	Song et al.	2021	An pabuonqedid mastotermitoid.	
Perlucipecta lacrima	Vršanský & Sendi	2022	A mesoblattinid	
Perspicuus pilosus	Koubová in Koubová & Mlynský	2020	An umenocoleoid or cratovitismid cockroach.	
Perspicuus vrsanskyi	Mlynský in Koubová & Mlynský	2020	An umenocoleoid or cratovitismid cockroach.	
Piloscutumus discretus	Sendi in Vršanský et al.	2022	A corydiid cockroach.	
Poikiloprosopon celiae	Sendi & Cumming in Sendi et al.	2023	An umenocoleid.	
Pokemon oculiapertion	Vršanská, Hinkelman & Vršanský in Vršanský et al.	2022	A corydiid cockroach.	
Pozabudnutie antiquorum	Hinkelman & Vršanský in Vršanský et al.	2022	Originally described as a phyloblattid cockroach; Nel, Garrouste & Jouault (2023) considered it to be a member of Dictyoptera of uncertain family affinities.	
Praeblattella continuosa	Šmídová, Bruthansová & Hain	2024		
Praeblattella patrickmuelleri	Šmídová, Bruthansová & Hain	2024		
Proelectrotermes holmgreni	Engel, Grimaldi & Krishna	2007	A dry wood termite.	
Proelectrotermes swinhoei	(Cockerell)	1916	A dry wood termite. Originally described as Termopsis swinhoei, moved from Kalotermes swinhoei.	
Raphidiomimula burmitica	Grimaldi & Ross	2004	A caloblattinid cockroach	
Sivis tykadlo	Kováčová	2023	A mesoblattinid	
Spinaeblattina myanmarensis	Hinkelman	2019	An mesoblattinid.	
Spinka fussa	Vršanský, Šmídová & Barna in Vršanský et al.	2019	A cockroach of uncertain placement. Originally assigned to the Blattidae; Qiu et al. (2020) transferred it to the family Corydiidae.	
Spongistoma angusta	Hinkelman in Sendi et al.	2020	A liberiblattinid cockroach.	
Squamicaputa tubulosa	Hinkelman & Koubová in Vršanský et al.	2022	A corydiid cockroach.	
Stavba babkaeva	Vršanský et al.	2019	A liberiblattinid cockroach.	
Stavba delicata	Sendi	2021	A liberiblattinid cockroach.	
Stavba jarzembowskii	Li et al.	2020	A liberiblattinid cockroach.	
Stavba magnoculara	Sendi	2021	A liberiblattinid cockroach.	
Stavba vrsanskyi	Chen, Xu & Chen	2020	A liberiblattinid cockroach.	
Tanytermes anawrahtai	Engel, Grimaldi & Krishna	2007	An eEuisopteran termite of uncertain placement.	
Tanytermitalis philetaerus	Engel & Cai in Jiang et al.	2021	A tanytermitid termite	
Teyia branislav	Vršanský & Wang in Vršanský et al.	2018	An Alienopterid dictyopteran.	
Teyia huangi	Vršanský, Mlynský & Wang in Vršanský et al.	2018	An Alienopterid dictyopteran.	
Trapezionotum vrsanskyi	Sendi et al.	2023	An umenocoleid.	
Tyrannotermes spinifer	Engel & Jouault	2024	A hodotermopsid termite.	
Valkyritermes inopinatus	Jouault, Engel & Nel in Jouault et al.	2022	A termite belonging to the family Kalotermitidae.	
Vitisma coriacea	Sendi	2024		
Vrtula exploratoremvalidator	Vršanský & Sendi	2024	A blattulid cockroach	
Vzrkadlenie karneri	Sendi & Cumming in Sendi et al.	2023		
Vzrkadlenie miso	Vršanský in Sendi et al.	2020	An alienopterid or cratovitismid dictyopteran	
Vzrkadlenie saintgermaini	Sendi & Cumming in Sendi et al.	2023		

=== Mantodea ===
Taxon	Authority	Year described	Notes	image
Burmantis asiatica	Grimaldi	2003	A gryllomantid mantis.	
Burmantis burmitica	(Grimaldi)	2003	A gryllomantid mantis.Originally described as "Jersimantis" burmitica	
Burmantis hexispinea	Li & Huang	2018	A gryllomantid mantis.	
Burmantis zherikhini	Delclòs et al.	2016	A gryllomantid mantis.	
Folimantis hyalinala	Yang et al.	2026	A mantis preserving evidence of mimicry of leaves of Selaginella.	

== Clade Neuropterida ==
=== Megaloptera ===
Taxon	Authority	Year described	Notes	image
Haplosialodes liui	Huang et al.	2016	An alderfly.	

=== Neuroptera ===
Taxon	Authority	Year described	Notes	image
Acanthoberotha cuspis	Nakamine, Yamamoto & Takahashi	2020	A rhachiberothid lacewing	
Acanthochrysa langae	Liu et al.	2022	A member of Chrysopoidea.	
Acanthomantispa grandis	Lu et al.	2020	A mantid fly.	
Acanthomantispa immaculata	Lu et al.	2020	A mantispid.	
Acanthomantispa maculata	Lu et al.	2020	A mantispid.	
Acanthopsychops triaina	Badano & Engel	2018	A psychopsid lacewing	Acanthopsychops triaina
Achlyoconis heptatrichia	Engel	2016	A Fontenelleini Aleuropteryginae dusty wing.	
Achlyoconis jiae	Li et al.	2019	A Fontenelleini Aleuropteryginae dusty wing.	
Adelpholeon lithophorus	Badano & Engel	2018	A sister genus to the antlion+owlfly clade	Adelpholeon lithophorus
Aggregataberotha paucipunctata	Chen, Shi, Ren & Yang in Chen et al.	2024	A berothid beaded lacewing.	
Aggregataberotha punctata	Wang, Huang & Wang in Wang et al.	2022	A berothid beaded lacewing.	
Allopteroneura burmana	Lu, Zhang & Liu	2019	An antlion.	
Anaberotha hui	Li, Li & Liu	2024	A berothid beaded lacewing.	
Ankyloleon caroluspetrus	Haug & Haug	2023	An early representative of the clade Myrmeleontiformia.	
Ankyloleon caudatus	Badano, Haug & Cerretti in Badano et al.	2021	An early representative of the clade Myrmeleontiformia.	
Ansoberotha jiewenae	Yang, Shi & Ren	2019	A beaded lacewing.	
Aphthartopsychops scutatus	Badano & Engel	2018	A psychopsid lacewing	Aphthartopsychops scutatus
Araripenymphpes burmanus	Lu, Xu & Liu	2022	A member of Myrmeleontoidea belonging to the family Cratosmylidae.	
Archaeoconis zhangzhiqiae	Chen et al.	2022	A dustywing.	
Archaeomegalomus burmiticus	Nakamine, Yamamoto & Takahashi	2022	A brown lacewing	
Archaeosymphrasis pennyi	Shi et al.	2019	A symphrasine mantis fly.	
Astioberotha coutreti	Jouault	2021	A rhachiberothid lacewing	
Astioberotha falcipes	Nakamine, Yamamoto & Takahashi	2020	A rhachiberothid lacewing	
Buratina truncata	Khramov, Yan & Kopylov	2019	A Paradoxosisyrinae spongillafly.	
Burmaleon magnificus	Myskowiak et al.	2016	An osmylid lacewing	
Burmaleuropteryx meinanderi	Li et al.	2019	An Aleuropteryginae dusty wing.	
Burmaneura minuta	Huang et al.	2016	An araripeneurine antlion.	
Burmithone pennyi	Lu et al.	2017	A moth lacewing.	
Burmitus tubulifer	Badano, Engel & Wang	2018	A Stem-group Myrmeleontidae + Ascalaphidae	Burmitus tubulifer
Burmobabinskaia tenuis	Lu, Zhang & Liu	2017	A Babinskaiid lacewing.	
Burmodipteromantispa jiaxiaoae	Liu, Lu & Zhang	2017	A Dipteromantispid mantid fly.	
Burmogramma liui	Liu et al.	2018	A Cretanallachiinae kalligrammatid lacewing.	Burmogramma liui
Burmopsychops isodiametrus	Peng et al.	2023	A Cretanallachiinae kalligrammatid lacewing.	
Burmopsychops labandeirai	Liu et al.	2018	A Cretanallachiinae kalligrammatid lacewing.	Burmopsychops labandeirai
Burmopsychops limoae	Lu, Zhang & Liu	2016	A possible kalligrammatid lacewing.	Burmopsychops limoae
Burmopsychops shihi	Peng et al.	2023	A Cretanallachiinae kalligrammatid lacewing.	
Burmotachinymphes bilobata	Cao, Wang & Liu	2021	A mesochrysopid lacewing.	
Burmotachinymphes pengi	Chen, Deng & Yang in Chen et al.	2022	A mesochrysopid lacewing.	
Calobabinskaia xiai	Lu, Wang & Liu	2021	A member of the family Babinskaiidae.	
Cladofer huangi	Badano, Engel & Wang	2018	A Stem-group Myrmeleontiformia	Cladofer huangi
Cornoberotha anomala	Yang et al.	2020	A berothid beaded lacewing.	
Cornoberotha aspoeckae	Yang et al.	2020	A berothid beaded lacewing.	
Cornoberotha monogona	Yang et al.	2020	A berothid beaded lacewing.	
Coronidilar yanae	Chen et al.	2022	A pleasing lacewing.	
Cratoneura cuneata	Yang et al.	2020	An araripeneurid lacewing.	
Creagroparaberotha cuneata	Nakamine, Yamamoto & Takahashi	2020		
Creagroparaberotha groehni	Makarkin	2015	A member of the subfamily Paraberothinae.	
Cretaconiopteryx grandis	Liu & Lu	2017	A dustywing.	
Cretaconiopteryx zhengpengyueae	Chen et al.	2022	A dustywing.	
Cretadilar olei	Makarkin	2017	A pleasing lacewing.	
Cretanallachius magnificus	Huang et al.	2015	A Cretanallachiinae kalligrammatid lacewing.	Cretanallachius magnificus
Cretarophalis patrickmuelleri	Wichard	2017	A Nevrorthid lacewing.	
Cretocroce xiai	Lu et al.	2019	A Crocine thread‐winged lacewing.	
Cretodilar burmanus	Liu & Zhang in Liu et al.	2016	A pleasing lacewing.	
Cretodilar multinervius	Chen et al.	2022	A pleasing lacewing.	
Cretogramma engeli	Liu et al.	2018	A Cretanallachiinae kalligrammatid lacewing.	Cretogramma engeli
Cretoneuronema jarzembowskii	Liu, Chen & Zhuo	2022	A brown lacewing	
Cycloconis maculata	Li et al.	2019	An aleuropterygine dusty wing.	
Dasyberotha eucharis	Engel & Grimaldi	2008	A beaded lacewing	
Dicranoberotha liumohanae	Zhuo, Li & Liu in Li et al.	2023	A rhachiberothid lacewing	
Dicranoberotha zhangzhiqiae	Zhuo, Li & Liu in Li et al.	2023	A rhachiberothid lacewing	
Dicranomantispa zhouae	Lu et al.	2020	A mantispid.	
Dilar cretaceus	Liu & Zhang in Liu et al.	2016	A pleasing lacewing.	
Diodontognathus papillatus	Badano, Engel & Wang	2018	A myrmeleontiform	Diodontognathus papillatus
Dolichoberotha burmana	Yang et al.	2020	A berothid beaded lacewing	
Dolichoberotha bifurcata	Yang et al.	2020	A berothid beaded lacewing	
Doratomantispa arcimaculata	Li et al.	2022	A mantispid.	
Doratomantispa ares	Lu et al.	2020	A mantispid.	
Doratomantispa burmanica	Poinar in Poinar & Buckley	2010	A mantispid.	
Doratomantispa gaoyuhei	Li et al.	2022	A mantispid.	
Doratomantispa hongi	Shi et al.	2019	A mantid fly.	
Doratomantispa pouilloni	Jouault & Nel in Jouault, Pouillon & Nel	2022	A mantispid.	
Doratomantispa pubescens	Lu et al.	2020	A mantispid.	
Doratomantispa yumeiyingae	Li et al.	2022	A mantispid.	
Doratomantispa zhangwenjuni	Li et al.	2022	A mantispid.	
Doratomantispa zhangzhiqiae	Li et al.	2022	A mantispid.	
Doratomantispa zhuozhengmingi	Li et al.	2022	A mantispid.	
Dryadithone cretacea	Li et al.	2026	A moth lacewing.	
Electrobabinskaia burmana	Lu, Zhang & Liu	2017	A Babinskaiid lacewing.	
Electrobabinskaia neli	Jouault	2022	A babinskaiid lacewing.	
Electrocaptivus xui	Badano, Engel & Wang	2018	A nymphid lascewing	Electrocaptivus xui
Electrogramma transformatum	Peng et al.	2024	A member of the family Kalligrammatidae.	
Electropsychops handlirschi	Lu et al.	2017	A silky lacewing.	
Electropsychops oligophlebius	Bai et al.	2019	A silky lacewing.	
Electroxipheus veneficus	Badano & Cerretti in Badano et al.	2024	A member of the stem group of Mantispoidea.	
Elenchonymphes electrica	Engel & Grimaldi	2008	A split-footed lacewing	
Enigmadipteromantispa dilatata	Li, Nakamine, Yamamoto & Liu in Li et al.	2023	A dipteromantispid.	
Enigmadipteromantispa dimyi	Azar, Maksoud & Huang	2020	A dipteromantispid.	
Eorhachiberotha burmitica	Engel	2004	A thorny lacewing	
Ethiroberotha elongata	Engel & Grimaldi	2008	A beaded lacewing	
Fiaponeura penghiani	Lu, Zhang & Liu	2016	A pleasing lacewing.	Fiaponeura penghiani
Gigantobabinskaia godunkoi	Makarkin & Staniczek	2019	A babinskaiid stem group antlion.	
Gigantoconis septemimacula	Xiao, Ren & Wang in Xiao et al.	2023	An aleuropterygine dustywing	
Glaesoconis baliopteryx	Engel	2004	A fontenelleine aleuropterygine dustywing	
Glaesoconis glaber	Jouault & Engel	2024		
Habrosymphrasis xiai	Shi et al.	2019	A mantid fly.	
Halteriomantispa grimaldii	Liu, Lu & Zhang	2016	A Dipteromantispidae.	Halteriomantispa grimaldii
Haplacantha robusta	Li et al.	2023	A mantispid.	
Haplacantha tenuis	Li et al.	2023	A mantispid.	
Haploberotha carsteni	Makarkin	2018	A beaded lacewing.	
Haploberotha persephone	Engel & Grimaldi	2008	A beaded lacewing	
Haplosymphrasites zouae	Lu et al.	2020	A mantispid.	
Hemeroberotha sinefurca	Makarkin & Gröhn	2020	A brown lacewing	
Iceloberotha kachinensis	Engel & Grimaldi	2008	A beaded lacewing	
Iceloberotha simulatrix	Engel & Grimaldi	2008	A beaded lacewing	
Jersiberotha musivum	Zhang et al.	2022	A beaded lacewing	
Jersiberotha myanmarensis	Engel & Grimaldi	2008	A beaded lacewing	
Jersiberotha tauberorum	Engel & Grimaldi	2008	A beaded lacewing	
Khobotun elephantinus	Khramov, Yan & Kopylov	2019	A paradoxosisyrine spongilla fly	
Kuafupolydentes hui	Luo, Liu & Jarzembowski	2022	An early member of Myrmeleontiformia.	
Kurtodipteromantispa relicta	Li, Nakamine, Yamamoto & Liu in Li et al.	2023	A dipteromantispid.	
Kurtodipteromantispa univenula	Li et al.	2023	A dipteromantispid.	
Kurtodipteromantispa xiai	Li et al.	2020	A dipteromantispid lacewing	
Kurtodipteromantispa zhuodei	Li & Liu	2020	A dipteromantispid lacewing	
Lasiogramma ooideum	Peng et al.	2024	A member of the family Kalligrammatidae.	
Lasiopsychops impunctatus	Bai et al.	2019	A silky lacewing.	
Litopsychopsis burmitica	Engel & Grimaldi	2008	A silky lacewing	
Lonchomantispa longa	Shi, Yang & Ren in Shi et al.	2020	A mantispid. Possibly a species of Doratomantispa.	
Longantenna hei	Li et al.	2023	A brown lacewing	
Macleodiella electrina	Badano & Engel	2018	A stem-group myrmeleontiform	Macleodiella electrina
Maculaberotha nervosa	Yuan, Ren & Wang	2016	A beaded lacewing.	
Magniberotha recurrens	Yuan, Ren & Wang	2016	A beaded lacewing.	
Mantispidipterella curvis	Chen et al.	2024	A dipteromantispid.	
Mantispidipterella longissima	Liu, Lu & Zhang	2017	A dipteromantispid mantid fly.	
Megalopteroneura chenxingi	Liu, Lu & Zhang	2016	A corydasialid lacewing.	
Mesomantispoides felixoporcus	Li et al.	2023	A mantispid.	
Mesoptynx unguiculatus	Badano, Engel & Wang	2018	A stem-group Myrmeleontidae + Ascalaphidae	Mesoptynx unguiculatus
Mesypochrysa coadnata	Chen et al.	2022	A green lacewing.	
Micromantispa cristata	Shi et al.	2015	A paraberothine or mantid fly.	
Micromantispa galeata	Nakamine, Yamamoto & Takahashi	2020	A paraberothine or mantid fly.	
Micromantispa spicata	Nakamine, Yamamoto & Takahashi	2020	A paraberothine or mantid fly.	
Microsisyra carsteni	Makarkin	2022	A member of the family Sisyridae.	
Mischemerobia yumini	Chen, Zhuo & Liu in Chen et al.	2024	A brown lacewing	
Mulleroconis hyalina	Ružičková, Nel & Prokop	2019	A dustywing.	Mulleroconis hyalina
Myanmarosmylus wintertoni	Li et al.	2024	An osmylid lacewing	
Nanoleon wangae	Hu, Lu & Liu	2019	An antlion.	
Nuddsia simplex	Li et al.	2024	An osmylid lacewing	
Nymphavus progenitor	Badano, Engel & Wang	2018	A nymphid lacewing	Nymphavus progenitor
Oligopsychopsis grandis	Lui et al.	2018	A Cretanallachiinae kalligrammatid lacewing.	Oligopsychopsis grandis
Oligopsychopsis groehni	(Makarkin)	2017	A Cretanallachiinae kalligrammatid lacewing. First described as "Burmopsychops" groehni.	Oligopsychopsis groehni
Oligopsychopsis penniformis	Chang et al.	2018	A Cretanallachiinae kalligrammatid lacewing.	
Osmyloberotha chenzuyini	Zhuo, Li & Liu in Li et al.	2023	A berothid beaded lacewing.	
Osmyloberotha dispersa	Li et al.	2023	A berothid beaded lacewing.	
Osmyloberotha magnimaculata	Li et al.	2023	A berothid beaded lacewing.	
Osmyloberotha simpla	Khramov	2021	A berothid beaded lacewing.	
Palaeoconis azari	Ružičková, Nel & Prokop	2019	A dusty wing.	Palaeoconis azari
Parababinskaia douteaui	Ngô-Muller et al.	2020	A babinskaiid lacewing.	
Parababinskaia makarkini	Hu et al.	2018	A babinskaiid lacewing.	Parababinskaia makarkini
Parabaisochrysa xingkei	Lu et al.	2018	A green lacewing.	Parabaisochrysa xingkei
Paraberothoides longispina	Li, Zhang & Liu in Li et al.	2023	A rhachiberothid lacewing	
Paracratochrysa bifurcata	Chen, Xu & Liu	2023	A corydasialid lacewing	
Paracratochrysa ternaria	Chen, Xu & Liu	2023	A corydasialid lacewing	
Paradipteromantispa polyneura	Li et al.	2020	A dipteromantispid lacewing	
Paradoxoberotha chimaera	Nakamine et al.	2021	A rhachiberothid lacewing	
Paradoxoconis longipalpa	Chen et al.	2022	A dustywing.	
Paradoxoconis szirakii	Chen et al.	2022	A dustywing.	
Paradoxoleon chenruii	Lu, Xu & Liu	2022	A Babinskaiid lacewing.	
Paradoxomantispa jiaxiaoae	Lu et al.	2020	A mantispid.	
Paradoxomantispa mahaiyingae	Li et al.	2022	A mantispid.	
Paradoxosisyra groehni	Makarkin	2016	A spongillafly	
Paranimboa litotes	Engel	2016	A Coniopterygini Coniopteryginae dusty lacewing.	
Pararchaeomegaloma suzheni	Chen, Zhuo & Liu in Chen et al.	2024	A brown lacewing	
Parasymphrasites electrinus	Lu et al.	2020	A mantispid.	
Parvosymphrasites aploneura	Li, Lin, Liu & Wang in Li et al.	2023	A mantispid.	
Pectispina libera	Shi, Yang & Ren in Shi et al.	2020	A mantispid.	
Pedanoptera arachnophila	Liu et al.	2016	A Mesochrysopid lacewing.	
Phthanoconis burmitica	Engel	2004	A phthanoconine coniopterygine dustywing	
Phyllochrysa huangi	Liu et al.	2018	A chrysopoid lacewing.	Phyllochrysa huangi
Phylloleon elegans	Lu, Wang & Liu	2019	An antlion.	
Phylloleon stangei	Lu, Ohl & Liu	2019	An antlion.	
Planiconis bimaculata	Xiao et al.	2023	An aleuropterygine dustywing	
Pristinofossor rictus	Badano & Engel	2018	A Stem-Myrmeleontidae ant-lion	Pristinofossor rictus
Proplega evelynae	Zhuo, Li & Liu in Li et al.	2023	A mantispid.	
Protoberotha minuta	Huang, Ren & Wang	2019	A beaded lacewing.	
Protosiphoniella anthophila	Khramov, Yan & Kopylov	2019	A paradoxosisyrine spongillafly.	
Pseudobabinskaia martinsnetoi	(Lu, Zhang & Liu)	2017	A Babinskaiid lacewing. Originally described as "Babinskaia" martinsnetoi.	
Pseudoneliana makarkini	Huang, Nel & Azar	2019	A babinskaiid lacewing	
Psilomantispa abnormis	Lu et al.	2020	A mantispid.	
Scoloberotha necatrix	Engel & Grimaldi	2008	A thorny lacewing.	
Sejunctaberotha sphaerica	Chen, Shi, Ren & Yang in Chen et al.	2024	A berothid beaded lacewing.	
Sejunctaberotha tenuis	Chen, Shi, Ren & Yang in Chen et al.	2024	A berothid beaded lacewing.	
Sejunctaberotha transversa	Chen, Shi, Ren & Yang in Chen et al.	2024	A berothid beaded lacewing.	
Sidorchukatia gracilis	Khramov, Yan & Kopylov	2019	A paradoxosisyrine spongillafly	
Simplicorydasialis fangyuani	Chen, Xu & Liu	2023	A corydasialid lacewing	
Simplicorydasialis simplicivenia	Chen, Xu & Liu	2023	A corydasialid lacewing	
Sisyroneurorthus aspoeckorum	Nakamine et al.	2023	A member of the family Nevrorthidae.	
Stenobabinskaia punctata	Lu, Wang & Liu	2021	A member of the family Babinskaiidae.	
Stictosisyra pennyi	Yang et al.	2018	A spongillafly	Stictosisyra pennyi
Stygioberotha siculifera	Nakamine, Yamamoto & Takahashi	2020	A rhachiberothid lacewing	
Systenoberotha magillae	Engel & Grimaldi	2008	A beaded lacewing	
Telistoberotha libitina	Engel & Grimaldi	2008	A beaded lacewing	
Tholimantispa zuoae	Chen et al.	2024	A dipteromantispid.	
Uranoberotha chariessa	Nakamine, Yamamoto & Takahashi	2020	A rhachiberothid lacewing	
Xiaobabinskaia lepidotricha	Lu, Wang & Liu	2021	A member of the family Babinskaiidae.	
Xiaoberotha bipunctata	Shi et al.	2019	A beaded lacewing.	
Xiaoberotha dilatapoda	Wang, Huang & Wang in Wang et al.	2022	A beaded lacewing.	
Xiaoleon amoena	Lu & Liu	2022	An antlion.	

=== Raphidioptera ===
Taxon	Authority	Year described	Notes	image
Allobaissoptera oligophlebia	Lu et al.	2020	A baissopterid snakefly	
Baissoptera burmana	Lu et al.	2020	A baissopterid snakefly, a species of Baissoptera.	
Baissoptera maculata	Lu et al.	2020	A baissopterid snakefly, a species of Baissoptera.	
Baissoptera monopoda	Lu et al.	2020	A baissopterid snakefly, a species of Baissoptera.	
Baissoptera pankowskiorum	Lu et al.	2020	A baissopterid snakefly, a species of Baissoptera.	
Baissoptera wangi	Lu et al.	2020	A baissopterid snakefly, a species of Baissoptera.	
Burmobiassoptera jiaxiaoae	Lu et al.	2020	A baissopterid snakefly.	
Burmoraphidia reni	Liu, Lu & Zhang	2016	A mesoraphidiid snakefly.	Burmoraphidia reni
Dolichoraphidia aspoecki	Liu, Lu & Zhang	2016	A mesoraphidiid snakefly.	Dolichoraphidia aspoecki
Dolichoraphidia engeli	Liu, Lu & Zhang	2016	A mesoraphidiid snakefly.	Dolichoraphidia engeli
Dolichoraphidia groehni	Makarkin	2023	A mesoraphidiid snakefly.	
Dracoraphidia brachystigma	Lu et al.	2024	A mesoraphidiid snakefly.	
Electrobaissoptera burmanica	Lu et al.	2020	A baissopterid snakefly.	
Electrobaissoptera liui	Jouault, Engel & Nel	2021	A baissopterid snakefly.	
Nanoraphidia electroburmica	Engel	2002	A nanoraphidiine snakefly	Nanoraphidia electroburmica
Rhynchobaissoptera hui	Lu et al.	2020	A baissopterid snakefly.	
Rhynchoraphidia burmana	Liu, Lu & Zhang	2016	A mesoraphidiid snakefly.	Rhynchoraphidia burmana
Stenobaissoptera xiai	Lu et al.	2020	A baissopterid snakefly.	
Teratocephala macrostigma	Lu et al.	2024	A mesoraphidiid snakefly.	

=== Other Neuropterida ===
Taxon	Authority	Year described	Notes	image
Partisaniferus atrickmuelleri	Haug et al.	2020	A neuropteriformian of uncertain phylogenetic placement.	
Partisaniferus? edjarzembowskii	Haug & Haug	2022	A neuropteriformian of uncertain phylogenetic placement.	

== Clade Paraneoptera ==
=== Hemiptera ===
Taxon	Authority	Year described	Notes	image
Acanthamnestus atridorsus	Du, Yao & Engel in Du et al.	2022	An amnestine cydnid.	
Acanthamnestus ovoideus	Du, Yao & Engel in Du et al.	2022	An amnestine cydnid.	
Achiderbe obrienae	Emeljanov & Shcherbakov	2020	A derbid planthopper.	
Acrotiara multigranulata	Luo & Bourgoin in Luo et al.	2021	A member of the family Cixiidae.	
Acutiangulus densus	Zhang, Liu & Yao in Zhang et al.	2024	A member of the family Reduviidae.	
Adocimycolus aarondavisii	Poinar & Vega	2023	A member of Coccoidea belonging to the family Adocimycolidae	
Albicoccus dimai	Koteja	2004	An albicoccid scale insect	
Alacrena peculiaris	Vea & Grimaldi	2015	A scale insect of uncertain placement. The type species is Alacrena .	
"Aleurodicus" burmiticus	Cockerell	1919	A whitefly	
Allocephalocoris zhengi	Luo, Baňař & Xie	2020	An enicocephalid.	
Alloeopterus anomeotarsus	Poinar & Brown	2020	A member of Sternorrhyncha belonging to the family Dinglidae.	
Amecephala pusilla	Drohojowska et al.	2020	A liadopsyllid psylloid.	
Amphignokachinia subversa	Brysz & Szwedo in Brysz, Müller & Szwedo	2023	A planthopper belonging to the family Achilidae.	
Angustipsyllidium minutum	Hakim et al.	2020	A paraprotopsyllidiid protopsyllidioid.	
Aphrastomedes anthocoroides	Yamada & Yamamoto in Yamada, Yamamoto & Takahashi	2018	A velocipedid cimicomorph.	
Aradoleptus birmanus	Heiss	2016	A flat bug.	
Araeoanasillus leptosomus	Poinar & Brown	2023	A froghopper. Possibly a species of Cretadorus.	
Archaeohebrus alius	Zhang, Ren & Yao	2024	A velvet water bug.	
Archeaneurus neli	Heiss	2019	A flat bug.	
Archearadus burmensis	Heiss & Grimaldi	2001	A flat bug.	
Archearadus elongatus	Heiss	2016	A flat bug.	
Archecalisius longiventris	Heiss	2019	A Calisiinae flat bug.	
Archemezira nuoxichenae	Heiss & Chen	2023	A member of the family Aradidae.	
Archemezira nuoyichenae	Heiss & Chen	2023	A member of the family Aradidae.	
Arcochterus fuscus	Zhang, Ren & Yao in Zhang et al.	2022	A member of the family Ochteridae.	
Awanis clarus	You et al.	2024	A progonocimicid moss bug.	
Ayaimatum minutum	Fu & Huang	2020	A mimarachnid planthopper.	
Ayaimatum trilobatum	Jiang et al.	2020	A mimarachnid planthopper.	
Bersta coleopteromorpha	Tihelka et al.	2020	A member of Cimicomorpha.	
Bersta vampirica	Tihelka et al.	2020	A member of Cimicomorpha.	
Birmaniaespina robustispina	Yu, Chen & An	2023	A yuripopovinid stalk-eyed true bug.	
Brevipronotum neli	Azar & Huang	2023	A member of the family Cydnidae.	
Burmacader bicoloripennis	Souma, Yamamoto & Takahashi	2021	A lace bug.	
Burmacader grandis	Heiss & Guilbert	2021	A lace bug.	
Burmacader lativentris	Heiss & Guilbert	2018	A lace bug.	
Burmacader multivenosus	Heiss & Guilbert	2013	A lace bug.	
Burmacicada protera	Poinar & Kritsky	2011	A cicada	
Burmacoccus danyi	Koteja	2004	A burmacoccid scale insect.	
Burmala liaoyaoi	Liu et al.	2021	A member of the family Malmopsyllidae or Liadopsyllidae.	
Burmametra macrocarinata	Huang et al.	2015	A water measurer.	
Burmaprosbole nervosa	Qiao et al.	2021	A member of the family Tettigarctidae.	
Burmapsyllidium grimaldii	Hakim, Azar & Huang	2022	A paraprotopsyllidiid protopsyllidioid.	
Burmapsyllidium setosum	Hakim et al.	2020	A paraprotopsyllidiid protopsyllidioid.	
Burmavianaida anomalocapitata	Souma, Yamamoto & Takahashi	2021	A member of the family Tingidae. A Senior synonym of Microtingis leptosoma Heiss & Golub (2021).	
Burmissus latimaculatus	Fu & Huang	2020	A mimarachnid planthopper.	
Burmissus raunoi	Shcherbakov	2017	A mimarachnid planthopper.	
Burmissus szwedoi	Luo et al.	2020	A mimarachnid planthopper.	
Burmitaphis prolatum	Poinar & Brown	2005	A burmitaphid aphid	
Burmocercopis lingpogensis	Fu, Cai & Huang	2019	A procercopid froghopper.	
Burmodicus cretaceus	Chen et al.	2020	A whitefly.	
Burmodicus monlyae	Chen et al.	2022	A whitefly.	
Burmogerris rarus	Fu, Cai, Chen & Huang in Fu et al.	2024	A member of Gerroidea of uncertain affinities.	
Burmorthezia insolita	Vea & Grimaldi	2012	An ensign scale insect.	
Burmorthezia kotejai	Vea & Grimaldi	2012	An ensign scale insect.	
Burmoselis evelynae	Shcherbakov	2000	A bernaeine whitefly.	
Burmotettix brunnescens	Dietrich & Zhang in Dietrich et al.	2022	A leafhopper.	
Burmotettix depressus	Dietrich & Zhang in Dietrich et al.	2022	A leafhopper.	
Burmotettix limpidus	Dietrich & Zhang in Dietrich et al.	2022	A leafhopper.	
Burmotettix ruber	Dietrich & Zhang in Dietrich et al.	2022	A leafhopper.	
Burmotettix rugosus	Dietrich & Zhang in Dietrich et al.	2022	A leafhopper.	
Calisiomorpha herczeki	Heiss	2023	A flat bug.	
Calisiomorpha yuripopovi	Heiss	2016	A flat bug.	
Carinametra burmensis	Andersen & Grimaldi	2001	A Heterocleptinae water measurer	
Caulinus burmitis	Poinar & Brown	2005	A burmitaphid aphid	
Caulisoculus electrus	Zhang & Chen	2020	A yuripopovinid stalk-eyed true bug.	
Caulisoculus minutus	Shang et al.	2020	A yuripopovinid stalk-eyed true bug.	
Caulisoculus monlyae	Zhuo & Chen in Zhuo et al.	2022	A yuripopovinid stalk-eyed true bug.	
Chilamnestocoris mixtus	Lis, Lis & Heiss	2018	A burrower bug.	
Cretacoelidia viraktamathi	Wang, Dietrich & Zhang	2019	A Coelidiinae leafhopper.	
Cretadorus orientalis	(Chen & Wang) in Chen et al.	2019	A sinoalid froghopper; Originally described as "Mesodorus" orientalis.	
Cretadorus qingyui	Chen et al.	2024	A sinoalid froghopper.	
Cretaleptus popovi	Sun & Chen	2020	A leptosaldine shore bug.	
Cretamesovelia pellai	Boderau et al.	2024	A member of the family Mesoveliidae.	
Cretamystilus herczeki	Kim, Lim & Jung	2021	A member of the family Miridae belonging to the tribe Mecistoscelini.	
Cretanabis kerzhneri	Kim et al.	2023	A member of the family Nabidae.	
Cretanazgul camillei	Garrouste et al.	2020	A nabid damsel bug.	
Cretocephalus stysi	Luo & Xie	2022	An aenictopecheid heteropteran	
Cretodorus angustus	Fu & Huang	2020	A mimarachnid planthopper.	
Cretodorus granulatus	Fu & Huang	2020	A mimarachnid planthopper.	
Cretodorus lijuanae	Liu & Jiang in Liu et al.	2024	A mimarachnid planthopper.	
Cretodorus multifoveatus	Liu et al.	2022	A mimarachnid planthopper.	
Cretodorus rostellatus	Zhang et al.	2021	A mimarachnid planthopper.	
Cretomultinervis burmensis	Fu & Huang	2021	A member of the family Sinoalidae.	
Cretopiesma engelgrimaldii	Azar, Heiss & Huang	2020	An aradid flat bug.	
Cretopiesma inexpectatum	Azar, Heiss & Huang	2020	An aradid flat bug.	
Cretopiesma lini	Azar, Heiss & Huang	2020	An aradid flat bug.	
Cretopiesma suukyiae	Grimaldi & Engel	2008	A flat bug.	
Cretosinoala tetraspina	Fu & Huang	2019	A Sinoalidae froghopper.	
Cretotettigarcta burmensis	Fu, Cai & Huang	2019	A stem cicadid.	
Cretotettigarcta problematica	(Jiang et al.)	2019	A stem cicadid. Originally described as Hpanraais problematicus.	
Cretotettigarcta shcherbakovi	Jiang et al.	2024	A stem cicadid.	
Cretozemira elongata	Heiss	2023	A member of the family Aradidae.	
Criniverticillus longicumulus	Lin, Yao & Ren	2018	A weitschatid Coccomorph.	
Cucullitingis biacantha	Du & Yao	2018	A lace bug.	
Dachibangus trimaculatus	Jiang, Szwedo & Wang	2018	A mimarachnid planthopper.	
Delphitiara tibiocoronata	Luo & Bourgoin in Luo et al.	2021	A member of the family Cixiidae.	
Derbachile aschei	Emeljanov & Shcherbakov	2020	A derbid planthopper.	
Derbachile hochae	Emeljanov & Shcherbakov	2020	A derbid planthopper.	
Dingla shagria	Szwedo & Drohojowska	2020	A member of Sternorrhyncha belonging to the family Dinglidae or Miralidae.	
Disphaerocephalus constrictus	Cockerell	1917	A Disphaerocephalinae gnat bug.	
Disphaerocephalus macropterus	Cockerell	1917	A Disphaerocephalinae gnat bug.	
Disphaerocephalus swinhoei	(Cockerell)	1917	A Disphaerocephalinae gnat bug. Originally described as "Enicocephalus" swinhoei.	
Dorytocus jiaxiaoae	Song, Szwedo & Bourgoin in Song et al.	2021	A dorytocid planthopper.	
Dorytocus ornithorhynchus	Emeljanov & Shcherbakov	2018	A dorytocid planthopper.	
Dumpyawnus hpungwanus	Zhang, Luo & Szwedo in Zhang et al.	2023	A katlasid planthopper.	
Duyana electronica	Chen et al.	2021	A ledrine leafhopper.	
Echinoaphis penalverii	Węgierek, Cai & Huang	2019	A burmitaphidid aphid.	
Ecpaglocoris ditomeus	Yamada & Yamamoto in Yamada, Yamamoto & Takahashi	2023	A vetanthocorid cimicoid.	
Electrala muae	Chen & Zhuo in Chen et al.	2020	A sinoalid froghopper	
Ellenbergeria oviventris	Heiss	2016	A flat bug.	
Eunotalia emeryi	Jiang et al.	2024	A stem cicadoid.	
Eurymacropsis yanzhenae	Dietrich & Wang	2024	A leafhopper.	
Eurypterogerron kachinensis	Chen et al.	2020	A minlagerrontid Cicadomorpha.	
Fangyuania xiai	Chen, Szwedo & Wang in Chen et al.	2018	A sinoalid froghopper.	
Feroculipodus obtusidentatus	Ma, Ren & Yao in Ma et al.	2023	A member of the family Nabidae.	
Feroorbis burmensis	Węgierek & Huang in Węgierek et al.	2017	A szelegiewicziid aphid.	
Ferriantenna excalibur	Cumming & Le Tirant	2021	A member of the family Coreidae belonging to the subfamily Coreinae.	
Ferriantenna gracenuoxichenae	Cumming, Le Tirant & Chen	2024		
Formosixinia aeterna	Chen & Wang in Chen et al.	2020	An archijassid treehopper.	
Foveopsis fennahi	Shcherbakov	2007	A perforissid planthopper.	
Foveopsis heteroidea	Zhang, Ren & Yao	2017	A perforissid planthopper.	
Furtivirete zhuoi	Zhang, Ren & Yao	2019	A jubisentid planthopper.	
Gakasha calcaridentata	Jiang, Wang & Szwedo	2019	A progonocimicid moss bug.	
Gelastocoris curiosus	Poinar & Brown	2016	A toad bug.	
Gilderius eukrinops	Vea & Grimaldi	2015	A mealybug.	
Grimaldinia pronotalis	Popov & Heiss	2014	A Leptosaldinae spiny-legged bug.	
Hexaphlebia burmanica	Poinar in Poinar & Brown	2014	A jumping ground bug.	
Hormatalis lancigerens	Węgierek & Wang in Węgierek et al.	2018	An isolitaphid aphid.	
Imbricatala novitas	Zhang et al.	2024	A planthopper belonging to the family Inoderbidae.	
Ingensala xiai	Luo, Song & Szwedo in Luo et al.	2022	An inoderbid planthopper.	
Inoderbe rapunzel	Shcherbakov & Emeljanov	2021	A planthopper belonging to the new family Inoderbidae.	
Isolitaphis prolatantennus	Poinar	2017	A juraphidid aphid.	
Jaculistilus oligotrichus	Zhang, Ren & Yao	2018	A mimarachnid planthopper.	
Jaculistilus xixuanae	Jiang, Chen & Szwedo	2022	A mimarachnid planthopper.	
Jiaotouia burmitica	Fu & Huang	2020	A sinoalid froghopper.	
Jiaotouia minuta	Chen & Wang in Chen et al.	2019	A sinoalid froghopper.	
Jubisentis hui	Zhang, Ren & Yao	2019	A jubisentid planthopper.	
Kachinella bicolor	Dietrich & Zhang in Dietrich et al.	2022	A leafhopper.	
"Kachinia" cretacea	Chen et al.	2019	A minute litter bug. The generic name is preoccupied by Kachinia Tong & Li (2018).	
Kachinocoris brevipennis	Heiss	2012	A flat bug	
Katlasus xiai	Luo et al.	2020	A katlasid planthopper.	
Kozarius achronus	Vea & Grimaldi	2015	A kozariid scale insect.	
Kozarius perpetuus	Vea & Grimaldi	2015	A kozariid scale insect.	
Kuanzuia cavanii	Chen & Zhuo	2024	A member of the family Schizopteridae.	
Laevigemma lisorum	Du, Yao & Engel in Du et al.	2022	An amnestine cydnid.	
Lanlakawa changdaensis	Luo et al.	2020	A perforissid planthopper.	
Latidorsum carinbifarium	Wang, Tang & Yao in Wang et al.	2021	A member of the family Tingidae.	
Leptosaldinea cobbeni	Popov & Heiss	2016	A spiny-legged bug or a schizopterid.	
Leptosaldinea zhengmingi	Chen & Zhuo in Chen et al.	2022	A spiny-legged bug or a schizopterid.	
Longivelia circuliplsus	Zhang et al.	2023	A member of the family Veliidae.	
Lumatibialis burmitis	Poinar in Poinar & Brown	2014	A jumping ground bug.	
Macrodrilus bostrychus	Poinar	2020	A macrodrilid scale insect.	
Macrolepta chenchenae	Yu, Zhuo & Chen in Yu et al.	2023	A member of the family Leptopodidae.	
Maculixius jiewenae	Bourgoin & Wang in Wang, Liang & Bourgoin	2022	A member of the family Cixiidae.	
Magnilens glaesaria	Vea & Grimaldi	2015	A scale insect of uncertain placement.	
Magnusantenna wuae	Du & Chen in Du et al.	2020	A member of the family Coreidae.	
Maliawa akrawna	Hakim et al.	2020	A paraprotopsyllidiid protopsyllidioid.	
Marmyan barbarae	Koteja	2004	A scale insect of uncertain placement	
Makrosala elegans	Chen & Wang in Chen et al.	2020	A sinoalid froghopper.	
Makrosala venusta	Chen & Wang in Chen et al.	2020	A sinoalid froghopper.	
Mecocollaris simplipodus	Ma et al.	2024	A member of the family Nabidae.	
Megagerron zhuoi	Chen et al.	2020	A minlagerrontid Cicadomorpha.	
Megalophthallidion burmapateron	Drohojowska & Szwedo in Drohojowska, Zmarzły & Szwedo	2022	A member of Sternorrhyncha belonging to the family Postopsyllidiidae.	
Megaoptocoris punctatus	Zhou et al.	2022	A yuripopovinid stalk-eyed true bug.	
Megaoptocoris similis	Zhou et al.	2022	A yuripopovinid stalk-eyed true bug.	
Mesolongicapitis peii	Chen et al.	2019	A sinoalid froghopper.	
Mesophthirus engeli	Gao, Shih, Rasnitsyn & Ren in Gao et al.	2019	A scale insect of uncertain family placement.	Mesophthirus engeli
Microaradus anticus	Heiss & Poinar	2012	An archaearadine flat bug.	
Mimaeurypterus burmiticus	Fu & Huang	2020	A mimarachnid planthopper.	
Mimaplax ekrypsan	Jiang, Szwedo & Wang	2019	A mimarachnid planthopper.	Mimaplax ekrypsan
Minlagerron griphos	Chen, Szwedo & Wang in Chen et al.	2019	A minlagerrontid Cicadomorpha.	
Minlagerron onyxos	Chen, Szwedo & Wang in Chen et al.	2019	A minlagerrontid Cicadomorpha.	
Mirala burmanica	Burckhardt & Poinar	2020	A psylloid jumping plant-louse.	
Miropictopallium coloradmonens	Fabrikant & Novoselska	2024	A yuripopovinid stalk-eyed true bug.	
Multistria fionae	Fabrikant, Huang & Fu	2024	A mimarachnid planthopper.	
Multistria irregularis	Fabrikant, Huang & Fu	2024	A mimarachnid planthopper.	
Multistria juanae	Fabrikant, Huang & Fu	2024	A mimarachnid planthopper.	
Multistria orthotropa	Zhang, Yao & Pang in Zhang et al.	2021	A mimarachnid planthopper.	
Myanmarvelia pankowskiorum	Boderau et al.	2023	A member of the family Mesoveliidae.	
Myanmezira longicornis	Heiss & Poinar	2012	A mezirine flat bug.	
Nerthra bichelata	Poinar & Brown	2016	A toad bug.	
Niryasaburnia burmitina	(Cockerell)	1917	An achilid planthopper. Originally described as "Liburnia" burmitina	
Niryasaburnia nigrutomia	Deng & Bourgoin in Deng et al.	2024	An achilid planthopper.	
Nolectra bourgoini	Luo, Gnezdilov, Zhuo & Song	2023	A nogodinid planthopper.	
Ornatiala amoena	Chen, Wang & Zhang in Chen et al.	2019	A sinoalid froghopper.	
Ornatiala kachinensis	Chen et al.	2020	A sinoalid froghopper.	
Pachytylaradus cretaceous	Heiss	2022	An aradid flat bug.	
Paenicotechys fossilis	(Cockerell)	1916	An Aenictopecheinae gnat bug. Originally described as "Enicocephalus" fossilis.	
Palaeoleptus burmanicus	Poinar	2009	A palaeoleptid or leptopodid bug.	
Palaeotanyrhina exophthalma	Poinar, Brown & Kóbor	2022	A reduvioid cimicomorph or a leptopodid bug.	
Paleoanomala aptenus	Poinar & Vega	2020	A lace bug.	
Paleolepidotus macrocolus	Poinar, Vega & Schneider	2020	A scale insect.	
Paleotriatoma metaxytaxa	Poinar	2019	An assassin bug.	
Paraburmoselis kachinensis	Chen et al.	2020	An aleyrodid whitefly.	
Paranthoscytina xiai	Fu, Cai & Huang	2019	A procercopid froghopper.	
Paraornatiala daidaleos	Fu & Huang	2019	A sinoalid froghopper.	
Paraphatnomacader huarongcheni	Guilbert & Heiss	2019	A lace bug.	
Paraprotopsyllidium spinosum	Hakim et al.	2020	A paraprotopsyllidiid protopsyllidioid.	
Parvaverrucosa annulata	(Poinar & Brown)	2005	A parvaverrucosid aphid. Originally described as "Verrucosa" annulata.	
Parvilepta jinghuiae	Yu, Zhuo & Chen in Yu et al.	2023	A member of the family Leptopodidae.	
Parvilepta jingyuanae	Yu, Zhuo & Chen in Yu et al.	2023	A member of the family Leptopodidae.	
Parvochterus lanceolarus	Zhang, Ren & Yao in Zhang et al.	2022	A member of the family Ochteridae.	
Parvochterus reticulatus	Zhang, Ren & Yao in Zhang et al.	2022	A member of the family Ochteridae.	
Parwaina liuyei	Song, Szwedo & Bourgoin in Song et al.	2019	A yetkhatid planthopper.	
Pedicellicoccus marginatus	Vea & Grimaldi	2015	A scale insect of uncertain placement.	
Pentacarinus kachinensis	Luo & Bourgoin in Luo et al.	2021	A member of the family Cixiidae.	
Pentacarinus maculosus	Deng & Wang in Deng et al.	2024	A member of the family Cixiidae.	
Pentacarinus tenebrosus	Deng & Wang in Deng et al.	2024	A member of the family Cixiidae.	
Pictala scorpioides	Ivanov, Vorontsov & Shcherbakov	2024	A member of Psylloidea belonging to the family Miralidae.	
Plecophlebus nebulosus	Cockerell	1917	A cixiid planthopper	
Postopsyllidium burmaticum	Hakim et al.	2019	A protopsyllidioid sternorrhynchen bug.	
Postopsyllidium grimaldii	Hakim et al.	2019	A protopsyllidioid sternorrhynchen bug.	
Postopsyllidium rebeccae	Grimaldi	2003	A protopsyllidioid sternorrhynchen bug.	
Pranwanna xiai	Jiang et al.	2024	A stem cicadid.	
Priscacutius denticulatus	Poinar & Brown	2017	A leafhopper.	
Prolavexillaphis munditia	Liu, Qiao & Yao in Liu et al.	2018	A juraphidid aphid.	
Protogeocoris arcanus	Kóbor, Faúndez & Roca-Cusachs	2023	A big eyed bug.	
Pseudocaulisoculus longicornis	Kóbor & Roca-Cusachs	2021	A member of the family Yuripopovinidae.	
Psilargus anufrievi	Shcherbakov	2020	A jubisentid planthopper.	
Pseudoweitschatus audebertis	Vea & Grimaldi	2015	A weitschatid scale insect.	
Pubivetanthocoris carinalis	Tang, Wang & Yao in Tang et al.	2021	A member of the family Vetanthocoridae.	
Pullneyocoris dentatus	Lis et al.	2020	A burrower bug.	
Punctacorona triplosticha	Wang et al.	2019	A burrower bug.	
Qiaoia menghaoae	Chen & Zhuo in Chen et al.	2024	A member of the family Schizopteridae.	
Qilia regilla	Chen et al.	2019	A Ledrinae leafhopper.	
Quasicimex eilapinastes	Engel	2008	A stem-group cimicid.	
Quinalveus hui	Du, Yao & Engel in Du et al.	2022	An amnestine cydnid.	
Reticulatitergum hui	Du et al.	2019	A yuripopovinid true bug.	
Rosahendersonia prisca	Vea & Grimaldi	2015	A coccid scale insect.	
Sauronaradus meganae	Cumming & Mlynarek	2024	A flat bug.	
Sinuovenaxius kachinensis	Wang & Bourgoin in Deng et al.	2024	An achilid planthopper.	
Spinitingis ellenbergeri	Heiss & Guilbert	2013	A lace bug.	
Spinonympha shcherbakovi	Luo, Wang & Jarzembowski	2021	A planthopper of uncertain phylogenetic placement.	
Stonymetopus megus	Poinar, Brown & Bourgoin	2022	A fulgoridiid planthopper.	
Tanaia burmitica	Perrichot, Nel, & Néraudeau	2007	A jumping ground bug.	
Tanyaulus caudisetula	Poinar	2018	A burmitaphid aphid.	
Tenebricosus coriaceus	He et al.	2022	A mimarachnid planthopper.	
Tingiometra burmanica	Heiss, Golub & Popov	2015	A lace bug.	
Tingiometra pankowskii	Golub & Heiss	2020	A lace bug.	
Tingiometra scutellbicostata	Mu et al.	2024	A lace bug.	
Tingiometra secunda	Golub & Heiss	2020	A lace bug.	
Tingiometra yuripopovi	Golub & Heiss	2020	A lace bug.	
Tingiphatnoma andreneli	Maksoud, Azar & Huang	2019	A lace bug.	
Tingiphatnoma bispinosa	Guilbert & Heiss	2019	A lace bug.	
Tingiphatnoma suchorskii	Heiss & Guilbert	2019	A lace bug.	
Tumpectus triporcatus	Dai et al.	2024	A yuripopovinid stalk-eyed true bug.	
Vasteantenatus hukawngi	Węgierek, Cai & Huang	2019	A burmitaphidid aphid.	
Vasteantenatus reliquialaus	Liu et al.	2019	A burmitaphidid aphid.	
Vetuprosbole parallelica	Fu, Cai & Huang	2019	A hairy cicada.	
Viraktamathus burmensis	Dietrich & Zhang in Dietrich et al.	2022	A leafhopper.	
Wangala kachinensis	Chen et al.	2022	A froghopper belonging to the family Sinoalidae.	
Wathondara kotejai	Simon, Szwedo & Xia in Wang et al.	2015	An ensign scale.	Wathondara kotejai
Xiaochibangus formosus	(Fu et al.)	2019	A mimarachnid planthopper. Originally described as Dachibangus formosus.	
Xiaochibangus hui	(Zhang, Yao & Pang in Zhang et al.)	2021	A mimarachnid planthopper. Originally described as Dachibangus hui.	
Yetkhata jiangershii	Song, Szwedo & Bourgoin in Song et al.	2019	A yetkhatid planthopper.	

=== Permopsocida ===
Taxon	Authority	Year described	Notes	image
Bittacopsocus megacephalus	Beutel et al.	2019	An ? archipsyllid Permopsocid	
Burmopsylla maculata	Liang, Zhang & Liu	2016	An archipsyllid Permopsocid	
Mydiognathus eviohlhoffae	Yoshizawa & Lienhard	2016	An archipsyllid Permopsocid	
Psocorrhyncha burmitica	Huang et al.	2016	An archipsyllid Permopsocid	Psocorrhyncha burmitica

=== Psocodea ===
Taxon	Authority	Year described	Notes	image
Annulipsyllipsocus andreneli	Hakim et al.	2018	A psyllipsocid cave barklouse.	
Annulipsyllipsocus inexspectatus	Hakim et al.	2018	A psyllipsocid cave barklouse.	
Archimenopon myanmarensis	Zhang et al.	2024	A member of the stem group of Amblycera.	
Atapinella garroustei	Azar et al.	2014	A pachytroctid booklice.	
Azarpsocus perreaui	Maheu & Nel	2020	A manicapsocid booklouse.	
Brachyantennum spinosum	Liang & Liu in Zhang, Liang & Liu	2022	A member of Trogiomorpha of uncertain affinities.	
Burmacompsocus banksi	(Cockerell)	1916	A compsocid booklouse. Originally described as "Psyllipsocus" banksi	
Burmacompsocus coniugans	Sroka & Nel	2017	A compsocid booklouse.	
Burmacompsocus perreaui	Nell & Waller	2007	A compsocid booklouse.	Burmacompsocus perreaui
Burmacompsocus pouilloni	Ngô-Muller, Garrouste & Nel	2020	A compsocid booklouse.	
Burmempheria curvatavena	Li, Yoshizawa & Yao in Li et al.	2022	An empheriid barklouse.	
Burmempheria densuschaetae	Li, Wang & Yao	2020	An empheriid barklouse.	
Burmempheria raruschaetae	Li, Wang & Yao	2020	An Empheriid	
Burmesopsocus lienhardi	Yoshizawa in Yoshizawa & Yamamoto	2021	A member of Homilopsocidea of uncertain phylogenetic placement.	
Burmipachytrocta singularis	Azar et al.	2014	A pachytroctid booklice.	
Concavapsocus parallelus	Wang et al.	2019	A psyllipsocid cave barklouse.	
Cormopsocus baleoi	Hakim, Azar & Huang	2021	A cormopsocid barklouse.	
Cormopsocus groehni	Yoshizawa & Lienhard	2020	A cormopsocid barklouse.	
Cormopsocus neli	Hakim, Azar & Huang in Hakim et al.	2021	A cormopsocid barklouse.	
Cretoscelis burmitica	Grimaldi & Engel	2006	A liposcelidid booklouse	
Heliadesdakruon morganae	Cumming & Le Tirant	2021	A member of Trogiomorpha belonging to the family Archaeatropidae.	
Latempheria kachinensis	Li, Yoshizawa & Yao in Li et al.	2022	An empheriid barklouse.	
Longiantennum fashengi	Liang et al.	2022	A member of the family Archaeatropidae.	
Longiglabellus edentatus	Wang, Li & Yao in Wang et al.	2021	A cormopsocid barklouse.	
Longiglabellus pedhyalinus	Wang, Li & Yao in Wang et al.	2021	A cormopsocid barklouse.	
Palaeomanicapsocus fouadi	Azar et al.	2016	A manicapsocid booklouse.	
Palaeomanicapsocus margoae	Azar et al.	2016	A manicapsocid booklouse.	
Palaeosiamoglaris burmica	Azar, Huang & Nel in Azar et al.	2017	A Prionoglaridid barklouse.	
Palaeosiamoglaris inexpectata	Azar, Huang & Nel in Azar et al.	2017	A Prionoglaridid barklouse.	
Palaeosiamoglaris leinhardi	Azar, Huang & Nel in Azar et al.	2017	A Prionoglaridid barklouse.	
Paraelectrentomopsis chenyangcaii	Azar, Hakim & Huang	2016	A cormopsocid barklouse.	
Paralellopsocus elongatus	Hakim, Huang & Azar	2023	An Empheriid	
Paramanicapsocus longiantennatus	Hakim, Azar & Huang	2020	A manicapsocid barklouse.	
Paramanicapsocus xingyuei	Liang in Chen, Wang & Liang	2023	A manicapsocid barklouse.	
Psyllipsocus mili	Weingardt, Liang & Yoshizawa in Weingardt et al.	2025	A psyllipsocid cave barklouse.	
Psyllipsocus myanmarensis	Jouault et al.	2021	A psyllipsocid cave barklouse.	
Psyllipsocus yangi	Liang & Liu	2021	A psyllipsocid cave barklouse.	
Psyllipsocus yoshizawai	Álvarez-Parra et al.	2020	A psyllipsocid cave barklouse.	
Stimulopsocus jiewenae	Liang & Liu	2021	A cormopsocid barklouse.	

=== Thysanoptera ===
Taxon	Authority	Year described	Notes	image
Adstrictubothrips mirapterus	Ulitzka	2022	A rohrthripid thrips.	
Burmacypha longicornis	Zherikhin	2000	A lophioneurid thrips.	
Burmathrips engeli	Peña-Kairath et al.	2024	A stenurothripid thrips.	
Cenomanithrips primus	Tong, Shih & Ren	2019	A stenurothripid thrips.	
Didymothrips abdominalis	Guo, Engel, Shih & Ren	2024	A stenurothripid thrips.	
Gemineurothrips microcephalus	Ulitzka	2022	A rohrthripid thrips.	
Gemineurothrips peculiaris	Ulitzka	2022	A rohrthripid thrips.	
Iotacypha vishniakovae	Shcherbakov & Shmakov	2024	A lophioneurid thrips.	
Iotacypha zherikhini	Shcherbakov, Bashkuev & Shmakov	2024	A lophioneurid thrips.	
Myanmarothrips pankowskiorum	Ulitzka	2018	A merothripid thrips.	
Paralleloalathrips bivenatus	Ulitzka	2022	A rohrthripid thrips.	
Parallelothrips separatus	Guo, Engel, Shih & Ren	2024	A stenurothripid thrips	
Retiptera brennae	Cumming et al.	2024	A lophioneurid thrips.	
Rohrthrips brachyvenis	Ulitzka	2022	A rohrthripid thrips.	
Rohrthrips breviceps	Ulitzka	2019	A rohrthripid thrips.	Rohrthrips breviceps
Rohrthrips burmiticus	Ulitzka	2018	A rohrthripid thrips.	Rohrthrips burmiticus
Rohrthrips jiewenae	Ulitzka	2019	A rohrthripid thrips.	Rohrthrips jiewenae
Rohrthrips maryae	Ulitzka	2019	A rohrthripid thrips.	Rohrthrips maryae
Rohrthrips multihamuli	Ulitzka	2022	A rohrthripid thrips.	
Rohrthrips pandemicus	Ulitzka	2022	A rohrthripid thrips.	
Rohrthrips patrickmuelleri	Ulitzka	2019	A rohrthripid thrips.	Rohrthrips patrickmuelleri
Rohrthrips rhamphorhynchus	Ulitzka	2022	A rohrthripid thrips.	
Rohrthrips schizovenatus	Ulitzka	2019	A rohrthripid thrips.	Rohrthrips schizovenatus
Rohrthrips setiger	Ulitzka	2022	A rohrthripid thrips.	
Sesquithrips markpankowskii	Ulitzka	2022	A rohrthripid thrips.	
Sesquithrips rostratus	Ulitzka	2022	A rohrthripid thrips.	

=== Zoraptera ===
Taxon	Authority	Year described	Notes	image
Xenozorotypus burmiticus	Engel & Grimaldi	2002	A zorotypid angel insect.	
Zorotypus (Octozoros) acanthothorax	Engel & Grimaldi	2002	A zorotypid angel insect.	
Zorotypus (Octozoros) cenomanianus	Yin, Cai & Huang	2018	A zorotypid angel insect.	
Zorotypus denticulatus	Yin, Cai & Huang	2018	A zorotypid angel insect.	
Zorotypus dilaticeps	Yin et al.	2018	A zorotypid angel insect.	
Zorotypus (Octozoros) hirsutu	Mashimo in Mashimo et al.	2018	A zorotypid angel insect.	Zorotypus hirsutus
Zorotypus (Octozoros) hukawngi	Chen & Su	2019	A zorotypid angel insect.	Zorotypus hukawngi
Zorotypus (Octozoros) nascimbenei	Engel & Grimaldi	2002	A zorotypid angel insect.	
Zorotypus oligophleps	Liu et al.	2018	A zorotypid angel insect.	
Zorotypus pecten	Mashimo, Müller & Beutel	2019	A zorotypid angel insect.	Zorotypus pecten
Zorotypus pusillus	Chen & Su	2019	A zorotypid angel insect.	
Zorotypus robustus	Liu et al.	2018	A zorotypid angel insect.	

== Clade Perlidea ==
=== Dermaptera ===
Taxon	Authority	Year described	Notes	image
Acanthodiplatys leptocercus	Ren, Zhang, Shih & Ren	2018	A Diplatyid earwig nymph	
Acantholabis coralloides	Mao, Engel, & Ren in Mao et al.	2020	A labidurid earwig.	
Astreptolabis ethirosomatia	Engel	2011	A pygidicranid earwig	Astreptolabis ethirosomatia
Astreptolabis laevis	Mao et al.	2020	A pygidicranid earwig	Astreptolabis laevis
Burmapygia resinata	Engel & Grimaldi	2004	A pygidicranid earwig	
Eminepygia myanmarensis	Chen & Zhang	2021	A pygidicranid earwig.	
Gracilipygia canaliculata	Ren, Zhang, Shih & Ren	2017	A pygidicranid earwig	
Hirtidiplatys cardiophyllus	Ren, Zhang, Shih & Ren	2018	A Diplatyid earwig nymph	
Metaxylabis baii	Peng et al.	2024	A labidurid earwig	
Myrrholabia electrina	(Cockerell)	1920	A labidurid earwig, originally described as Labidura electrina	Myrrholabia electrina (type illustration)
Prodacnodes dupliforceps	Peng et al.	2024	A pygidicranid earwig	
Robustipygia calvata	Ren, Zhang, Shih & Ren	2018	A pygidicranid earwig	
Stonychopygia laticoncava	Wang et al.	2022	A pygidicranid earwig	
Stonychopygia leptocerca	Engel & Huang	2017	A pygidicranid earwig	
Toxolabis zigrasi	Engel & Grimaldi	2014	An Anisolabididae earwig	
Tricholabidura elongata	Peng & Engel in Peng et al.	2022	A labidurid earwig	
Tytthodiplatys mecynocercus	Engel	2011	A Diplatyidae earwig	Tytthodiplatys mecynocercus
Tytthodiplatys ortholabis	Ren, Zhang, Shih & Ren	2018	A Diplatyid earwig nymph	
Zeugmadiplatys cheni	Peng et al.	2024	A haplodiplatyid earwig	
Zigrasolabis speciosa	Engel & Grimaldi	2014	A Labiduridae earwig	

=== Embioptera ===
Taxon	Authority	Year described	Notes	image
Atmetoclothoda orthotenes	Engel & Huang in Engel et al.	2016	A clothodid webspinner. Atmetoclothoda .	
Burmitembia venosa	Cockerell	1919	A Notoligotomid webspinner.	Burmitembia venosa (type illustration)
Gnethoda ancyla	Cui & Engel	2020	A clothodid webspinner.	
Gnethoda lata	Liu, Shi, Ren & Yang in Liu et al.	2024	A member of the family Clothodidae belonging to the subfamily Gnethodinae.	
Gnethoda symmetrica	Cui & Engel	2020	A clothodid webspinner.	
Henoclothoda simplex	Cui & Engel	2020	A clothodid webspinner.	
Litoclostes delicatus	Engel & Huang in Engel et al.	2016	An oligotomid webspinner.	
Ocrognethoda olivea	Liu, Shi, Ren & Yang in Liu et al.	2024	A member of the family Clothodidae belonging to the subfamily Gnethodinae.	
Parasorellembia hamata	Liu, Shi, Ren & Yang in Liu et al.	2024	A member of the family Scelembiidae belonging to the subfamily Sorellembiinae.	
Sorellembia estherae	Engel & Grimaldi	2006	A sorellembiid webspinner	

=== Grylloblattodea ===
Taxon	Authority	Year described	Notes	image
Sylvalitoralis cheni	Zhang, Bai & Yang in Zhang et al.	2016	An ice crawler nymph of uncertain placement.	

=== Phasmatodea ===
Taxon	Authority	Year described	Notes	image
Breviala cretacea	Yang et al.	2023	A timematod stick insect.	
Echinosomiscus primoticus	Engel & Wang in Engel, Wang & Alqarni	2016	A phasmatid stick insect.	
Elasmophasma longitubus	Yang, Engel, Ren & Gao in Yang et al.	2022	A euphasmatod stick insect.	
Elasmophasma stictum	Chen et al.	2018	A euphasmatod stick insect.	
Electroclavella genuina	Yang et al.	2023	A timematod stick insect.	
Granosicorpes lirates	Chen et al.	2019	A timematod stick insect.	
Leptophasma physematosa	Yang, Shih, Ren & Gao in Yang et al.	2019	A pterophasmatid stick insect.	
Meniscophasma erythrosticta	Yang, Shih, Ren & Gao in Yang et al.	2019	A pterophasmatid stick insect.	
Pseudoperla leptoclada	Chen et al.	2017	An archipseudophasmatid stick insect.	
Pseudoperla scapiforma	Chen et al.	2017	An archipseudophasmatid stick insect.	
Pterophasma erromera	Yang, Shih, Ren & Gao in Yang et al.	2019	A pterophasmatid stick insect.	
Rhabdophasma arboreum	Yang, Engel, Ren & Gao in Yang et al.	2022	A member of Euphasmatodea belonging to the group Neophasmatodea.	
Tanaophasma applanatum	Yang, Engel, Ren & Gao in Yang et al.	2022	A member of Euphasmatodea belonging to the group Neophasmatodea.	
Tumefactipes prolongates	Chen et al.	2019	A timematod stick insect.	

=== Plecoptera ===
Taxon	Authority	Year described	Notes	image
Borisoperla kondratieffi	Chen & Xu	2020	A peltoperlid stonefly	
Branchioperla ianstewarti	Sroka & Staniczek	2020	A petroperlid stonefly	
Burmacroneuria projecta	Chen	2019	A perlid common stonefly.	
Burmesoperla expansa	Chen	2019	An acroneuriine common stonefly.	
Burperla decolorata	Chen	2020	A perlid common stonefly.	
Cretacroneuria angularis	Chen	2020	A perlid common stonefly.	
Crossoperla teslenkoae	Chen	2024	A member of Systellognatha; the type genus of the new family Crossoperlidae.	
Electroneuria ronwoodi	Sroka, Staniczek & Kondratieff	2018	A perlid common stonefly.	Electroneuria ronwoodi
Lapisperla keithrichardsi	Sroka, Staniczek & Kondratieff	2018	A petroperlid stonefly.	Lapisperla keithrichardsi
Largusoperla acus	Chen, Wang, & Du	2018	A perlid common stonefly.	Largusoperla acus
Largusoperla arcus	Chen, Wang, & Du	2018	A perlid common stonefly.	Largusoperla arcus
Largusoperla billwymani	Sroka, Staniczek & Kondratieff	2018	A perlid common stonefly.	Largusoperla billwymani
Largusoperla borisi	Chen	2018	A perlid common stonefly.	Largusoperla borisi
Largusoperla brianjonesi	Sroka, Staniczek & Kondratieff	2018	A perlid common stonefly.	Largusoperla brianjonesi
Largusoperla charliewattsi	Sroka, Staniczek & Kondratieff	2018	A perlid common stonefly.	Largusoperla charliewattsi
Largusoperla crassus	Chen	2018	A perlid common stonefly.	Largusoperla crassus
Largusoperla dewalti	Chen	2018	A perlid common stonefly.	Largusoperla dewalti
Largusoperla difformitatem	Chen	2018	A perlid common stonefly.	Largusoperla difformitatem
Largusoperla flata	Chen, Wang, & Du	2018	A perlid common stonefly.	Largusoperla flata
Largusoperla micktaylori	Sroka, Staniczek & Kondratieff	2018	A perlid common stonefly.	Largusoperla micktaylori
Largusoperla reni	Chen & Wang	2019	A perlid common stonefly.	Largusoperla reni
Petroperla mickjaggeri	Sroka, Staniczek & Kondratieff	2018	A petroperlid stonefly.	Petroperla mickjaggeri
Pinguisoperla yangzhouensis	Chen	2018	A perlid common stonefly.	Pinguisoperla yangzhouensis
Starkoperla longusocollum	Chen & Wang	2020	A perlid common stonefly.	
Zwickoperla brevicauda	Chen & Wang	2020	A perlid or peltoperlid stonefly.	

== Clade Palaeoptera ==
=== Ephemeroptera ===
Taxon	Authority	Year described	Notes	image
Burmaheptagenia zhouchangfai	Chen & Zheng	2023	A heptageniid or vietnamellid mayfly. Possibly a species of Burmella.	
Burmella clypeata	Godunko, Martynov & Staniczek	2021	A vietnamellid mayfly	
Burmella inconspicua	Godunko & Staniczek in Godunko et al.	2025	A vietnamellid mayfly	
Burmella paucivenosa	Godunko, Martynov & Staniczek	2021	A vietnamellid mayfly	
Crephlebia zhoui	Chen & Zheng	2024	A leptophlebiid mayfly	
Crepotamanthus spinitarsus	Zheng & Chen	2023	An australiphemerid mayfly.	
Nanophemera myanmarensis	McCafferty & Santiago-Blay	2008	An australiphemerid mayfly	
Hexameropsis elongatus	Lin, Shih & Ren	2018	A hexagenitid mayfly.	
Kachinophlebia zhouchangfai	Chen & Zheng	2022	A leptophlebiid mayfly.	
Longiheptagenia bipartita	Yang et al.	2023	A heptageniid mayfly.	
Longiheptagenia elegantula	Yang et al.	2023	A heptageniid mayfly.	
Myanmarella rossi	Sinitshenkova	2000	A baetid mayfly.	
Oculephemera mazhenxingi	Zheng & Chen	2023	A oculephemerid mayfly.	
Proximicorneus rectivenius	Lin, Shih & Ren	2017	A prosopistomatid mayfly.	
Siphlonephemerella mupengxui	Chen & Zheng	2023	A siphlonuroid mayfly belonging to the family Siphlonephemerellidae.	
Vetuformosa buckleyi	Poinar	2011	A baetid mayfly	Vetuformosa buckleyi

=== Odonatoptera ===
Taxon	Authority	Year described	Notes	image
Angustaeshna magnifica	Huang, Cai & Nel	2017	A burmaeshnid dragonfly.	
Araripegomphus shai	Zheng et al.	2018	An araripegomphid dragonfly.	
Arcanodraco filicauda	Schädel, Müller & Haug	2020	A stem Odonatoptera of uncertain placement.	
Bilebullephlebia legendrei	Jouault & Nel	2023	A burmaphlebiid damsel-dragonfly.	
Burmachistigma cheni	Zheng et al.	2017	A burmacoenagrionid damselfly.	
Burmacoenagrion pretiosus	Zheng et al.	2017	A burmacoenagrionid damselfly.	
Burmadysagrion zhangi	Zheng, Wang & Nel in Zheng et al.	2016	A burmadysagrionid damselfly First described as a dysagrionid damselfly	
Burmaeshna azari	Huang et al.	2017	A burmaeshnid dragonfly.	
Burmagomphides electronica	Zheng, Nel & Wang in Zheng et al.	2017	A burmagomphid dragonfly.	
Burmagrion azari	Huang, Nel & Ngô-Muller	2020	A burmacoenagrionid damselfly.	
Burmagrion marjanmatoki	Möstel, Schorr & Bechly	2017	A burmacoenagrionid damselfly.	Burmagrion marijanmatoki
Burmahemiphlebia zhangi	Zheng et al.	2017	A hemiphlebiid damselfly.	
Burmalindenia imperfecta	Schädel & Bechly	2016	A Lindeniinae gomphid dragonfly.	Burmalindenia imperfecta
Burmaphlebia reifi	Bechly & Poinar	2013	A burmaphlebiid damsel-dragonfly.	
Burmastenophlebia flecki	Huang, Fu & Nel	2019	A stenophlebiid damsel-dragonfly.	
Burmahemiphlebia hui	Zheng & Wang	2018	A hemiphlebiid damselfly.	
Cretadisparoneura hongi	Huang et al.	2015	A platycnemidid damselfly.	
Cretaeshna lini	Zheng et al.	2017	A burmaeshnid dragonfly.	
Cretagomphaeschnaoides jarzembowskae	Zheng et al.	2016	A gomphaeschnid dragonfly.	
Cretamegaloprepus zhouae	Zheng, Nel & Wang in Zheng et al.	2018	A mesomegaloprepid damselfly.	
Electrocoenagrion elongatum	Zheng et al.	2017	A burmacoenagrionid damselfly.	
Electrocoenagrion forficatum	Zheng et al.	2017	A burmacoenagrionid damselfly.	
Electrodysagrion lini	Zheng, Nel & Wang in Zheng et al.	2017	A burmadysagrionid damselfly First described as a dysagrionid damselfly	
Electrodysagrion neli	Zheng et al.	2019	A burmadysagrionid damselfly First described as a dysagrionid damselfly	
Gunterbechlya pumilio	Huang, Fu & Nel	2020	A putative Gomphidae club-tailed dragonfly.	
Kachingomphides yujiai	Liu et al.	2024	A burmagomphid dragonfly.	
Kachinhemiphlebia lini	Zheng	2020	A hemiphlebiid damselfly.	
Mesomegaloprepus liea	Nel, Wang & Huang	2024	A mesomegaloprepid damselfly.	
Mesomegaloprepus magnificus	Huang et al.	2017	A mesomegaloprepid damselfly.	
Mesosticta additicta	Nel, Jouault & Huang	2024	A platystictid damselfly.	
Mesosticta burmatica	Huang et al.	2015	A platystictid damselfly.	
Mesosticta davidattenboroughi	Zheng et al.	2017	A platystictid damselfly.	
Mesosticta electronica	Zheng et al.	2016	A platystictid damselfly.	
Neoaeschna kachinensis	Liu, Fang & Zheng	2024	A burmaeshnid dragonfly.	
Palaeodisparoneura burmanica	Poinar, Bechly & Buckley	2010	A platycnemidid damselfly.	
Palaeodisparoneura cretacica	Zheng, Wang & Chang	2017	A platycnemidid damselfly.	
Palaeodysagrion cretacicus	Zheng et al.	2016	A burmadysagrionid damselfly First described as a dysagrionid damselfly	
Palaeoperilestes electronicus	Zheng et al.	2016	A perilestid damselfly.	
Paraburmagomphides zhaoi	Zheng et al.	2018	A paraburmagomphid dragonfly.	
Paracoryphagrion deltoides	Zheng, Nel & Wang in Zheng et al.	2018	A paracoryphagrionid damselfly.	
Pouillonphlebia burmitica	Ngô-Muller, Garrouste & Nel	2020	A burmaphlebiid damsel-dragonfly	
Protohemiphlebia meiyingae	Zheng, Jarzembowski & Nel in Zheng et al.	2021	A stem hemiphlebioid damselfly belonging to the family Protohemiphlebiidae.	
Protohemiphlebia zhangi	Zheng, Jarzembowski & Nel in Zheng et al.	2021	A stem hemiphlebioid damselfly belonging to the family Protohemiphlebiidae.	
Pseudopalaeodysagrion youlini	Zheng, Chang & Wang	2017	A Burmadysagrionid damselfly First described as a dysagrionid damselfly. Moved from Palaeodysagrion youlini (2023)	
Yijenplatycnemis huangi	Zheng et al.	2017	A platycnemidid damselfly.	

== Archaeognatha ==
Family	Genus	species	Authority	Year described	Notes	image
Meinertellidae	Cretaceobrevibusantennis	Cretaceobrevibusantennis hookensis	Chen & Su	2017	A meinertellid rock bristletail.	
Meinertellidae	Cretaceobrevibusantennis	Cretaceobrevibusantennis thornis	Chen & Su	2017	A meinertellid rock bristletail.	
Meinertellidae	Cretaceomachilis	Cretaceomachilis longa	Zhang et al.	2017	A meinertellid rock bristletail.	
Meinertellidae	Nullmeinertellus	Nullmeinertellus wenxuani	Zhang et al.	2017	A meinertellid rock bristletail.	
Meinertellidae	Unimeinertellus	Unimeinertellus abundus	Zhang et al.	2017	A meinertellid rock bristletail.	
Meinertellidae	Unimeinertellus	Unimeinertellus bellus	Zhang et al.	2017	A meinertellid rock bristletail.	

== Zygentoma ==
Family	Genus	Species	Authority	Year described	Notes	image
Lepismatidae	Allacrotelsa	Allacrotelsa burmiticus	(Cockerell)	1917	A lepismatid silverfish. First described as "Lampropholis" burmiticus	
Lepismatidae	Burmalepisma	Burmalepisma cretacicum	Mendes & Poinar	2008	A lepismatid silverfish.	
Lepismatidae	Cretalepisma	Cretalepisma kachinicum	Mendes & Wunderlich	2013	A lepismatid silverfish.	
