= Cormopsocidae =

Cormopsocidae Temporal range: Cenomanian

Scientific classification
- Kingdom: Animalia
- Phylum: Arthropoda
- Class: Insecta
- Order: Psocodea
- Suborder: Trogiomorpha
- Family: †Cormopsocidae; Yoshizawa & Lienhard, 2020

Extinct family of insects

Cormopsocidae is an extinct family of Psocodea. All currently known members are from the mid-Cretaceous Burmese amber of Myanmar. The family is considered either to be the earliest diverging group of the suborder Trogiomorpha, or the sister group to all other psocids, and retains many primitive characteristics.

== Taxonomy ==
- Cormopsocus Yoshizawa & Lienhard, 2020
  - Cormopsocus groehni Yoshizawa & Lienhard, 2020
  - Cormopsocus neli Hakim et al., 2021
  - Cormopsocus perantiqua (Cockerell, 1919).
- Stimulopsocus Liang and Liu, 2021
  - Stimulopsocus jiewenae Liang and Liu, 2021
- Longiglabellus Wang, Li & Yao, 2021
  - Longiglabellus edentatus Wang, Li & Yao 2021
  - Longiglabellus pedhyalinus Wang, Li & Yao, 2021
