= Parvaverrucosa =

Parvaverrucosa Temporal range: Cenomanian

Scientific classification
- Kingdom: Animalia
- Phylum: Arthropoda
- Clade: Pancrustacea
- Class: Insecta
- Order: Hemiptera
- Suborder: Sternorrhyncha
- Superfamily: †Paleoaphidoidea
- Family: †Parvaverrucosidae; Poinar & Brown, 2006
- Genus: †Parvaverrucosa; Poinar & Brown, 2006
- Species: †P. annulata

Binomial name
- †Parvaverrucosa annulata (Poinar & Brown, 2005)

Synonyms
- Verrucosa annulata Poinar & Brown, 2005

Extinct family of true bugs

Parvaverrucosa is an insect genus in the extinct, monotypic family Parvaverrucosidae, of the order Hemiptera. It contains the monotypic species Parvaverrucosa annulata known from the Cenomanian aged Burmese amber of Myanmar. First described in 2005, the genus was redescribed in 2019, which found it to be in the superfamily Palaeoaphidoidea
