= Sabatinca perveta =

Sabatinca perveta Temporal range: Cenomanian 99 Ma

Scientific classification
- Kingdom: Animalia
- Phylum: Arthropoda
- Class: Insecta
- Order: Lepidoptera
- Family: Micropterigidae
- Genus: Sabatinca
- Species: S. perveta

Binomial name
- Sabatinca perveta (Cockerell, 1919)

Synonyms
- Micropterix pervetus (Cockerell, 1919); Micropterix perveta; Sabatinca pervetus

Extinct species of moth

Sabatinca perveta is an extinct species of moth belonging to the family Micropterigidae. It is known only from the single type specimen, which has been found in Burmese amber in present-day Myanmar. It dates to the earliest Cenomanian, around 99 million years (mya) ago.
