= Jubisentidae =

Scientific classification
- Domain: Eukaryota
- Kingdom: Animalia
- Phylum: Arthropoda
- Class: Insecta
- Order: Hemiptera
- Suborder: Auchenorrhyncha
- Infraorder: Fulgoromorpha
- Superfamily: Fulgoroidea
- Family: †Jubisentidae; Zhang, Ren, & Yao, 2019

Extinct family of insects

Jubisentidae is an extinct family of planthoppers. It contains 3 genera in 2 subfamilies.

== Subfamilies and genera ==
- † Jubisentinae Zhang, Ren & Yao, 2019
  - † Furtivirete Zhang, Ren & Yao, 2019
  - † Jubisentis Zhang, Ren & Yao, 2019
- † Psilarginae Shcherbakov, 2020
  - † Psilargus Shcherbakov, 2020
