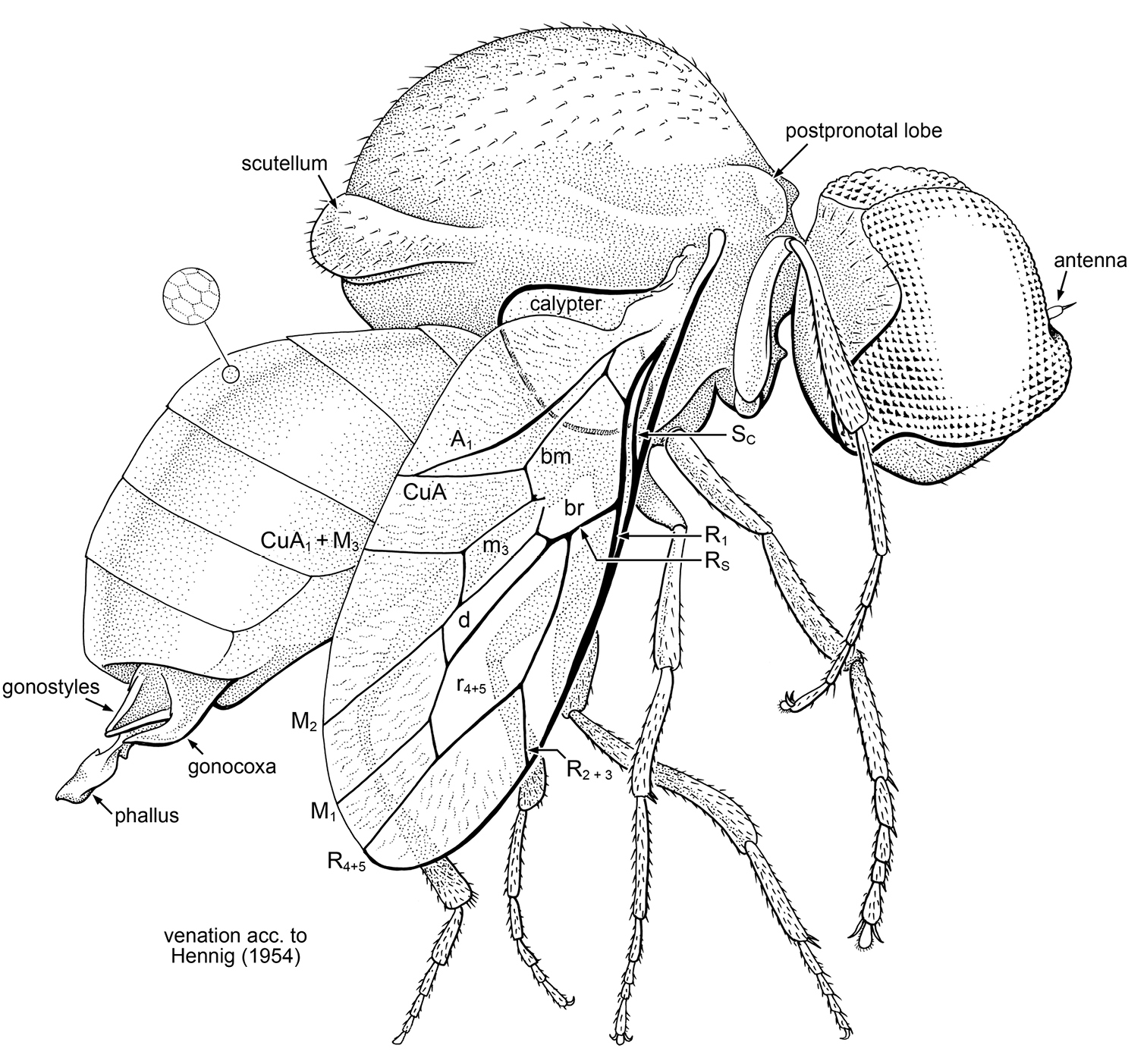

Scientific classification
- Kingdom: Animalia
- Phylum: Arthropoda
- Class: Insecta
- Order: Diptera
- Family: Acroceridae
- Subfamily: Acrocerinae
- Genus: †Schlingeromyia; Grimaldi & Hauser in Grimaldi, Arillo, Cumming & Hauser, 2011
- Species: †S. minuta

Binomial name
- †Schlingeromyia minuta Grimaldi & Hauser in Grimaldi, Arillo, Cumming & Hauser, 2011

= Schlingeromyia =

Schlingeromyia Temporal range: Cenomanian

Extinct genus of flies

Schlingeromyia is an extinct genus of small-headed flies in the family Acroceridae. The genus is known from Upper Cretaceous fossils in Burmese amber from Myanmar. It contains only one species, Schlingeromyia minuta.

The genus is named in honor of Evert I. Schlinger. The specific name is the Latin word for "small", referring to the very small size of the species.
