= Paradidyma singularis =

Scientific classification
- Domain: Eukaryota
- Kingdom: Animalia
- Phylum: Arthropoda
- Class: Insecta
- Order: Diptera
- Family: Tachinidae
- Tribe: Minthoini
- Genus: Paradidyma
- Species: P. singularis

Binomial name
- Paradidyma singularis (Townsend, 1891)

Synonyms
- Atrophopoda singularis Townsend, 1891; Lachnomma magnicornis Townsend, 1892

Species of fly

Paradidyma singularis is a species of bristle fly in the family Tachinidae. It is found in North America.
