= Xiphochaeta =

Xiphochaeta is the scientific name of two genera of organisms and may refer to:

- Xiphochaeta (fly), a genus of flies in the family Tachinidae
- Xiphochaeta (plant), a genus of plants in the family Asteraceae
