= Paradidyma conica =

Scientific classification
- Kingdom: Animalia
- Phylum: Arthropoda
- Class: Insecta
- Order: Diptera
- Family: Tachinidae
- Tribe: Minthoini
- Genus: Paradidyma
- Species: P. conica

Binomial name
- Paradidyma conica (Townsend, 1891)

Synonyms
- Ceratomyiella conica Townsend, 1891

Species of fly

Paradidyma conica is a species of bristle fly in the family Tachinidae.

== Distribution ==
United States.
