= Zigrasolabis =

Zigrasolabis Temporal range: Albian

Scientific classification
- Kingdom: Animalia
- Phylum: Arthropoda
- Class: Insecta
- Order: Dermaptera
- Family: Labiduridae
- Genus: †Zigrasolabis
- Species: †Z. speciosa

Binomial name
- †Zigrasolabis speciosa Engel & Grimaldi, 2014

Extinct genus of earwigs

Zigrasolabis is an extinct genus of earwig in the family Labiduridae known from Cretaceous fossils found in Myanmar. The genus contains a single described species, Zigrasolabis speciosa.

== History and classification ==
Zigrasolabis is known from a group of fossils, the holotype, specimen number JZC-Bu232, along with two paratypes and a partial specimen. The specimens are composed of three fully complete adult female earwigs, and the partial female, which have been preserved as inclusions in a single transparent chunk of Burmese amber. The age of the amber deposits in Kachin State in northernmost Burma is understood to be at least 100 million years old, placing them in the Albian age of the Cretaceous. As of 2014, Burmese amber has been radiometrically dated using U-Pb isotopes, yielding an age of approximately 99 million years old, close to the Aptian – Cenomanian boundary. At the time of description, the amber specimen was residing in the private collection of James Zigras and only available for study through the American Museum of Natural History.

The Zigrasolabis type specimens, recovered from amber bearing outcrops in Kachin State, were first studied by paleoentomologists Michael S. Engel of the Division of Entomology at the University of Kansas, and David Grimaldi of the American Museum of Natural History. Engel and Grimaldi's 2014 type description of the new species was published in the journal Novitates Paleoentomologicae. The genus name Zigrasolabis was coined by Engel and Grimaldi as a combination of Greek word labis, which means "forceps" and Zigras in honor of James Zigras. The specific epithet speciosa is from the Latin word speciosus, which translate as "splendid". Zigrasolabis is one of six described earwig species found in Burmese amber. A second species, Toxolabis zigrasi was also described by Engel and Grimaldi in 2014 paper. Two species Astreptolabis ethirosomatia and Tytthodiplatys mecynocercus were described by Engel in the same 2011 paper, while Burmapygia resinata was described by Engel and David Grimaldi in 2004, with the last species Myrrholabia electrina first described by Theodore Cockerell in 1920.

== Description ==
Female Zigrasolabis have and overall coloration that appears to be mat brown to dark brown, lightening on the legs and mouth parts. The females range between approximately 8.0–8.3 millimetres (0.31–0.33 in) in length when the cerci are included. The bodies are only sparsely covered in setae, which are not thickened enough to be chaetulose. The antennae have a slightly wide scape and are at least fourteen flagellomeres long, though both the holotype and the paratypes have incomplete antennae. As is typical with earwigs, the forewings have been modified into tegma which cover the first segments of the abdomen. The hind wings are present, but due to positioning of the tegma, are mostly obscured, though the tips extend beyond the tegma. The slender cerci are tubular and straight, tapering along the length to sharp points at the ends.
