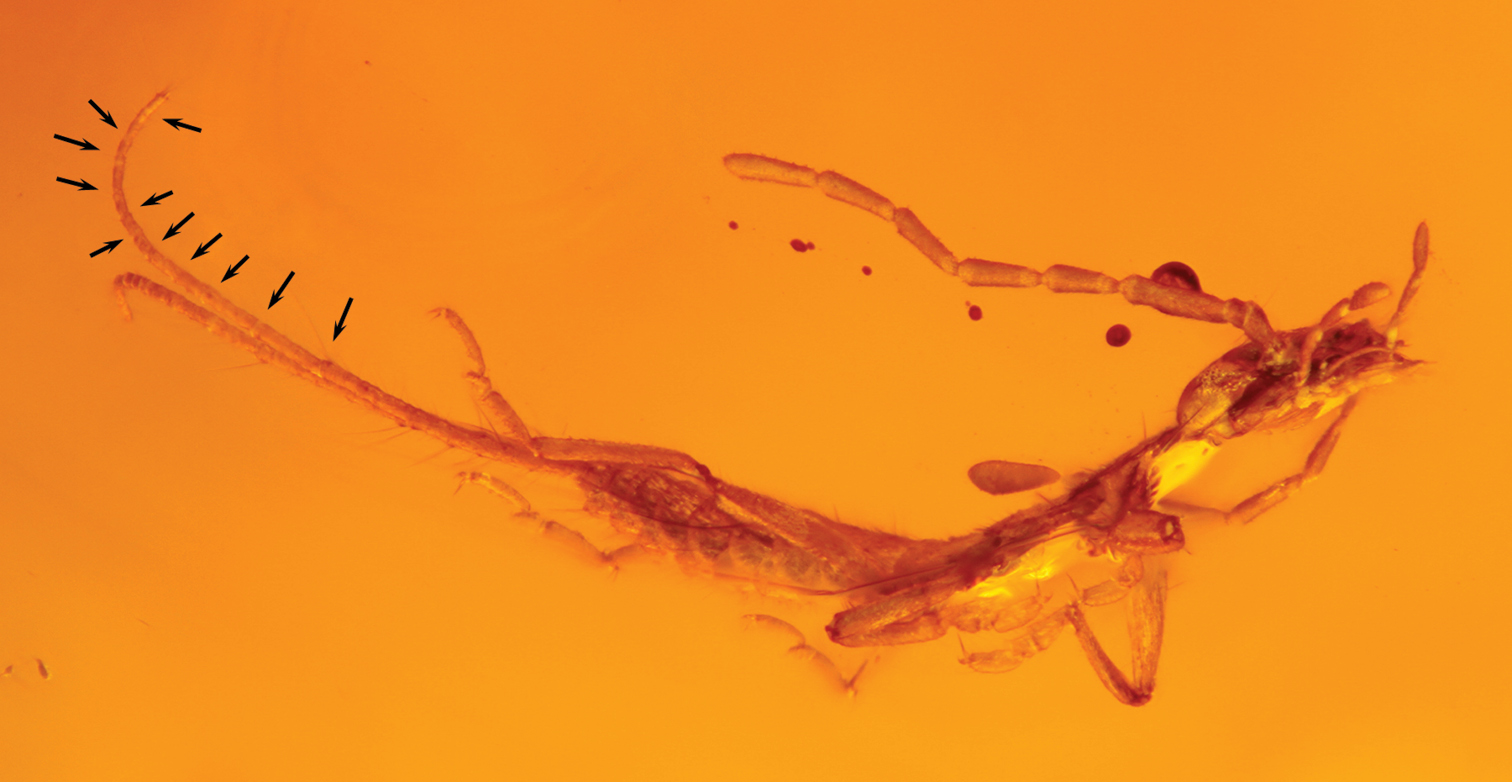
- Tytthodiplatys mecynocercus

Scientific classification
- Domain: Eukaryota
- Kingdom: Animalia
- Phylum: Arthropoda
- Class: Insecta
- Order: Dermaptera
- Suborder: Neodermaptera
- Infraorder: Protodermaptera
- Superfamily: Pygidicranoidea
- Family: Diplatyidae; Verhoeff, 1902

Subfamilies and genera
- See text

= Diplatyidae =

Diplatyidae Temporal range: Albian-Recent

Family of earwigs

Diplatyidae is a family of earwigs in the suborder Neodermaptera. It contains three subfamilies, and four genera incertae sedis, one modern and three extinct known from fossils.

== Taxonomy ==
Subfamilies and genera as listed at the Dermaptera species file:

subfamily Cylindrogastrinae Maccagno, 1929

1. Cylindrogaster Stal, 1855

=== Diplatyinae ===
Authority: Verhoeff, 1902

1. Circodiplatys Steinmann, 1986
2. Diplatyella Gorokhov & Anisyutkin, 1994
3. Diplatys Audinet-Serville, 1831
4. Eudiplatys Steinmann, 1986
5. Mesodiplatys Steinmann, 1986
6. Nannopygia Dohrn, 1862
7. Paradiplatys Zacher, 1910

=== Diplatymorphinae ===
Authority: V Boeseman, 1954

1. Diplatymorpha Boeseman, 1954

=== Genera incertae sedis ===
1. †Acanthodiplatys Ren, Zhang, Shih & Ren, 2018: monotypic A. leptocercus Ren, Zhang, Shih & Ren, 2018
2. †Hirtidiplatys Ren, Zhang, Shih & Ren, 2018: monotypic H. cardiophyllus Ren, Zhang, Shih & Ren, 2018
3. Songmaella Gorokhov & Anisyutkin, 1994: monotypic S. princeps Gorokhov & Anisyutkin, 1994
4. †Tytthodiplatys Engel, 2011

The genus Tytthodiplatys was described in 2011 from a fossil found in Burmese amber which dates to the Albian age of the Cretaceous. It was not placed into the subfamily Diplatyinae, and is the oldest confirmed member of the family.
