= Demogorgon (disambiguation) =

Demogorgon is an artificial pagan god or demon invented by Christian scholars, possibly as the result of a transcription error.

Demogorgon may also refer to:

- Demogorgon (Dungeons & Dragons), a demon prince in the Dungeons & Dragons role-playing game
- Demogorgon (Stranger Things), a fictional monster named after but not especially similar to the Dungeons and Dragons demon
- Demogorgon, a horror novel by Brian Lumley
- Demogorgon, an invalid genus name used for earwigs presently in the genus Labidura
