= Paradidyma affinis =

Scientific classification
- Kingdom: Animalia
- Phylum: Arthropoda
- Class: Insecta
- Order: Diptera
- Family: Tachinidae
- Subfamily: Tachininae
- Tribe: Minthoini
- Genus: Paradidyma
- Species: P. affinis

Binomial name
- Paradidyma affinis Reinhard, 1934

Species of fly

Paradidyma affinis is a species of bristle fly in the family Tachinidae.

== Distribution ==
Canada, United States, Mexico.
