= Labidura cryptera =

Scientific classification
- Domain: Eukaryota
- Kingdom: Animalia
- Phylum: Arthropoda
- Class: Insecta
- Order: Dermaptera
- Family: Labiduridae
- Genus: Labidura
- Species: L. cryptera

Binomial name
- Labidura cryptera Liu, 1946

Species of striped earwig

Labidura cryptera is an extant species of striped earwig from the genus Labidura of the family Labiduridae. The species is commonly known as the "cryptic earwig" due to its elusive behavior and preference for damp, hidden, shelter.

== Description ==
Labidura cryptera can be identified by its elongated, flattened body. Adults can grow to 10 to 25 millimeters in length. The body of Labidura cryptera is bilaterally symmetrical and it sports a pair of membranous wings beneath its forewings. Individuals have black stripes that run the length of their body with a dark pattern on the back edge of the forewings. Like all earwigs, Labidura cryptera has a pair of pincers or cerci of the back of the abdomen.

== Range ==
Labidura cryptera is found in small regions of China in very specific habitats.

== Ecology ==
The earwig prefers dark, moist environments under some sort of cover or shelter in the daytime. It is a primarily nocturnal insect doing most of its activity under the cover of night. Labidura cryptera can be found in coastal and inland dunes with vegetation and cover.

Labidura cryptera is an omnivorous insect and very generalistic when it comes to feeding. It will eat plant matter, hunt smaller insects and larvae, and also eat decaying matter. due to its willingness to eat insects and decaying matter, Labidura cryptera plays an essential role in agriculture, as many farmers will use it as pest control.

== Nesting and life cycle ==
When the time comes, female specimens will find a dark covered area usually under a rock or tree bark, and using its specialized mouth parts, it will begin digging a nesting chamber that will serve multiple purposes, such as laying eggs and as a safe place to molt. Females lay eggs one at a time and usually lay around 30-50 eggs at once and are arranged in a cluster. The female will guard and groom the eggs while also collecting food for herself and for when the eggs hatch. After around 10 days, the eggs begin to hatch and the mother will maintain and protect the nymphs until they become independent and can leave the nest. Females can repeat this process up to three times in their lifetime.
