= Vanderwulpia sequens =

Scientific classification
- Kingdom: Animalia
- Phylum: Arthropoda
- Class: Insecta
- Order: Diptera
- Family: Tachinidae
- Subfamily: Tachininae
- Tribe: Minthoini
- Genus: Vanderwulpia
- Species: V. sequens

Binomial name
- Vanderwulpia sequens Townsend, 1892

Synonyms
- Wulpia aperta Brauer & von Bergenstamm, 1893

Species of fly

Vanderwulpia sequens is a species of bristle fly in the family Tachinidae.

== Distribution ==
United States, Mexico.
