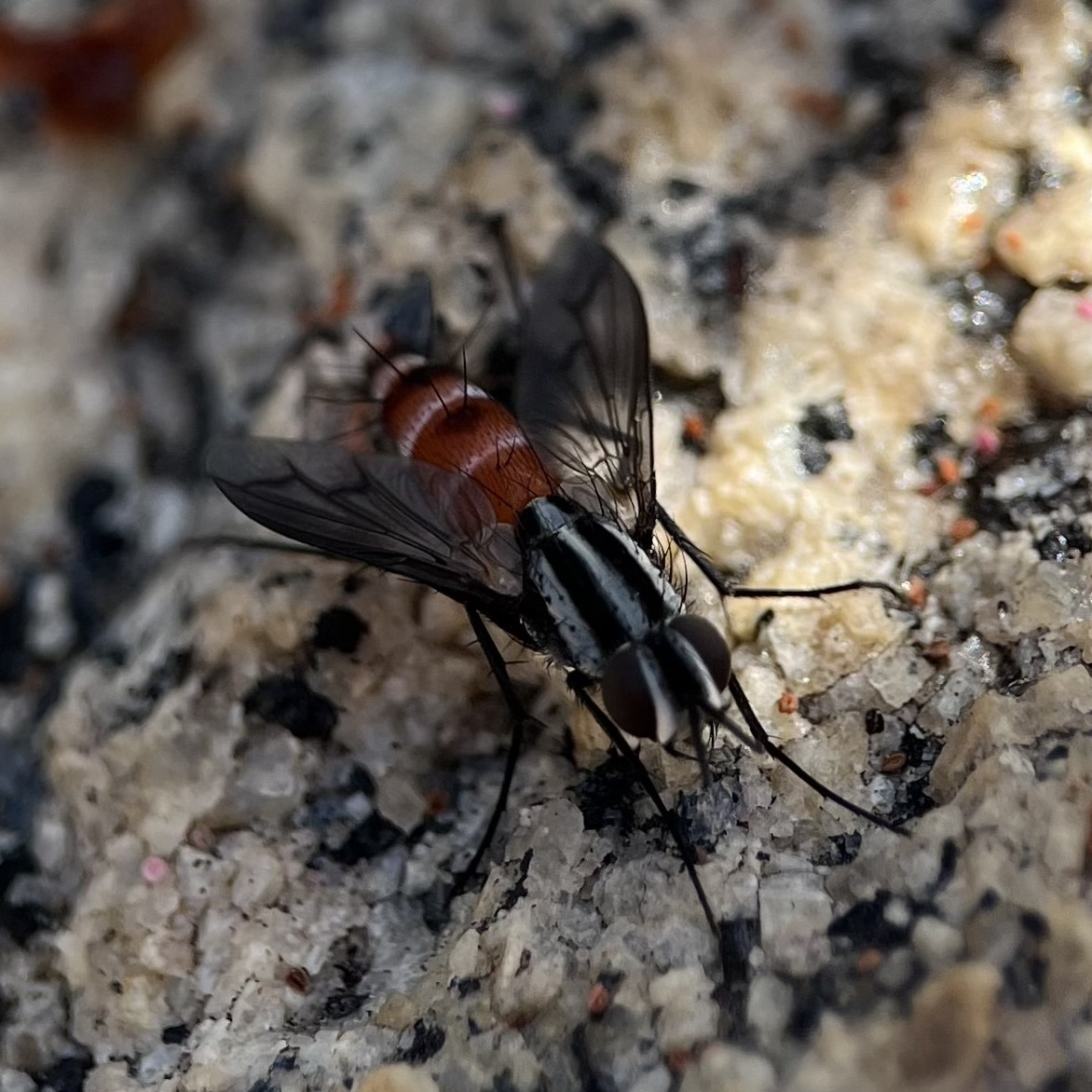

Scientific classification
- Kingdom: Animalia
- Phylum: Arthropoda
- Clade: Pancrustacea
- Class: Insecta
- Order: Diptera
- Family: Tachinidae
- Subfamily: Tachininae
- Tribe: Minthoini
- Genus: Vanderwulpia
- Species: V. atrophopodoides

Binomial name
- Vanderwulpia atrophopodoides Townsend, 1891

= Vanderwulpia atrophopodoides =

Species of fly

Vanderwulpia atrophopodoides is a species of bristle fly in the family Tachinidae.

== Distribution ==
United States, Mexico.
