= Dyshypostena edwardsi =

Scientific classification
- Kingdom: Animalia
- Phylum: Arthropoda
- Class: Insecta
- Order: Diptera
- Family: Tachinidae
- Subfamily: Tachininae
- Tribe: Minthoini
- Genus: Dyshypostena
- Species: D. edwardsi

Binomial name
- Dyshypostena edwardsi (van Emden, 1960)

Synonyms
- Kinangopana edwardsi van Emden, 1960

Species of fly

Dyshypostena edwardsi is a species of tachinid flies in the genus Dyshypostena of the family Tachinidae.

== Distribution ==
Kenya.
