= Paradidyma melania =

Scientific classification
- Kingdom: Animalia
- Phylum: Arthropoda
- Class: Insecta
- Order: Diptera
- Family: Tachinidae
- Subfamily: Tachininae
- Tribe: Minthoini
- Genus: Paradidyma
- Species: P. melania

Binomial name
- Paradidyma melania (Townsend, 1919)

Synonyms
- Metachaeta cinerosa Reinhard, 1923; Metallicomintho abdominalis Townsend, 1919; Micromintho melania Townsend, 1919; Wagneria distincta Curran, 1928

Species of fly

Paradidyma melania is a species of bristle fly in the family Tachinidae.

== Distribution ==
Canada, United States.
