= Toxolabis =

Toxolabis Temporal range: Albian

Scientific classification
- Kingdom: Animalia
- Phylum: Arthropoda
- Clade: Pancrustacea
- Class: Insecta
- Order: Dermaptera
- Family: Anisolabididae
- Genus: †Toxolabis
- Species: †T. zigrasi

Binomial name
- †Toxolabis zigrasi Engel & Grimaldi, 2014

Extinct genus of earwigs

Toxolabis is an extinct genus of earwig in the dermapteran family Anisolabididae known from a Cretaceous fossil found in Burma. The genus contains a single described species, Toxolabis zigrasi.

== History and classification ==
Toxolabis is known from a group of fossils, the holotype, specimen number JZC-Bu231, along with two first instar nymphs which may be of the same species. The specimens have been preserved as inclusions in a single transparent chunk of Burmese amber. The age of the amber deposits in Kachin State in northernmost Burma are understood to be at least 100 million years old, placing them in the Albian age of the Cretaceous. As of 2014, Burmese amber has been radiometrically dated using U-Pb isotopes, yielding an age of approximately 99 million years old, close to the Aptian – Cenomanian boundary. At the time of description, the amber specimen was residing in the private collection of James Zigras and only available for study through the American Museum of Natural History.

The Toxolabis type specimen, recovered from amber bearing outcrops in Kachin State, was first studied by paleoentomologists Michael S. Engel of the Division of Entomology at the University of Kansas, and David Grimaldi of the American Museum of Natural History. Engel and Grimaldi's 2014 type description of the new species was published in the journal Novitates Paleoentomologicae. The genus name Toxolabis was coined by Engel and Grimaldi as a combination of Greek words labis, which means "forceps" and toxon meaning "bow", a reference to the shape of the cercal forceps. The specific epithet zigrasi in honor of James Zigras. T. zigrasi is one of six described earwig species found in Burmese amber. A second species, Zigrasolabis speciosa was also described by Engel and Grimaldi in the 2014 paper. Two species Astreptolabis ethirosomatia and Tytthodiplatys mecynocercus were described by Engel in the same 2011 paper, while Burmapygia resinata was described by Engel and David Grimaldi in 2004, with the last species Myrrholabia electrina first described by Theodore Cockerell in 1920.

== Description ==
Male Toxolabis have an overall coloration that appears to be mat brown. They are approximately 6.2 millimetres (0.24 in) in length when the cerci are included, with a rather flattened body. The bodies are only sparsely covered in setae, which are not thickened enough to be chaetulose. The antennae have a slightly wide scape and are at least twelve flagellomeres (segments) long, though both of the holotypes' antennae are incomplete. As is typical with earwigs, the forewings have been modified into short tegma which cover most but not all of the first abdominal segment. The hind wings are present, but due to positioning of the tegma, are mostly obscured, though the tips extend beyond the tegma. The slender cerci are tubular and straight at the base, tapering along the length to sharp points at the ends, with an incurve starting just past the midpoint. Each of the cerci has several sparse setae on the middle portions.
