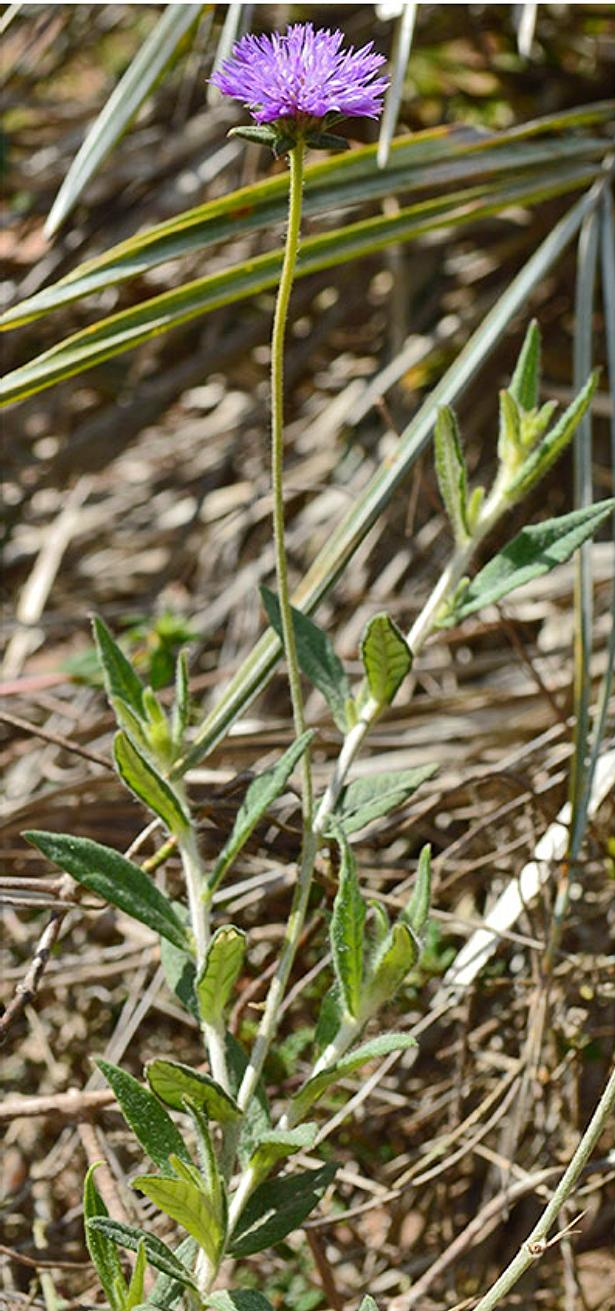
- Stilpnopappus semirianus

Scientific classification
- Kingdom: Plantae
- Clade: Tracheophytes
- Clade: Angiosperms
- Clade: Eudicots
- Clade: Asterids
- Order: Asterales
- Family: Asteraceae
- Subfamily: Cichorioideae
- Tribe: Vernonieae
- Genus: Stilpnopappus; Mart. ex DC.

Type species
- Stilpnopappus pratensis Mart. ex DC.

Synonyms
- Strophopappus (DC.) DC.

= Stilpnopappus =

Genus of plants

Stilpnopappus is a genus of Brazilian plants in the tribe Vernonieae within the family Asteraceae.

Species

- Stilpnopappus apurensis
- Stilpnopappus bicolor
- Stilpnopappus bullatus
- Stilpnopappus cearensis
- Stilpnopappus emarginatus
- Stilpnopappus ferrugineus
- Stilpnopappus glomeratus
- Stilpnopappus pantanalensis
- Stilpnopappus pittieri
- Stilpnopappus pohlii
- Stilpnopappus pratensis
- Stilpnopappus regnellii
- Stilpnopappus scaposus
- Stilpnopappus sellowianus
- Stilpnopappus semirianus
- Stilpnopappus speciosus
- Stilpnopappus suffruticosus
- Stilpnopappus tomentosus
- Stilpnopappus trichospiroides
- Stilpnopappus villosus

formerly included

see Caatinganthus, Xiphochaeta

- Stilpnopappus aquaticus - Xiphochaeta aquatica
- Stilpnopappus rubropappus - Caatinganthus rubropappus
- Stilpnopappus viridis - Xiphochaeta aquatica
