= Plesina zimini =

Scientific classification
- Kingdom: Animalia
- Phylum: Arthropoda
- Class: Insecta
- Order: Diptera
- Family: Tachinidae
- Subfamily: Tachininae
- Tribe: Minthoini
- Genus: Plesina
- Species: P. zimini

Binomial name
- Plesina zimini Richter, 1991

Species of fly

Plesina zimini is a species of bristle fly in the family Tachinidae.

== Distribution ==
Uzbekistan.
