= Actinochaeta columbiae =

Scientific classification
- Kingdom: Animalia
- Phylum: Arthropoda
- Class: Insecta
- Order: Diptera
- Family: Tachinidae
- Subfamily: Tachininae
- Tribe: Minthoini
- Genus: Actinochaeta
- Species: A. columbiae

Binomial name
- Actinochaeta columbiae Brauer & von Bergenstamm, 1889

Species of fly

Actinochaeta columbiae is a species of tachinid flies in the genus Actinochaeta of the family Tachinidae.
