= Paradidyma validinervis =

Scientific classification
- Kingdom: Animalia
- Phylum: Arthropoda
- Class: Insecta
- Order: Diptera
- Family: Tachinidae
- Tribe: Minthoini
- Genus: Paradidyma
- Species: P. validinervis

Binomial name
- Paradidyma validinervis (Wulp, 1890)

Synonyms
- Didyma validinervis Wulp, 1890

Species of fly

Paradidyma validinervis is a species of bristle fly in the family Tachinidae.

== Distribution ==
Mexico.
