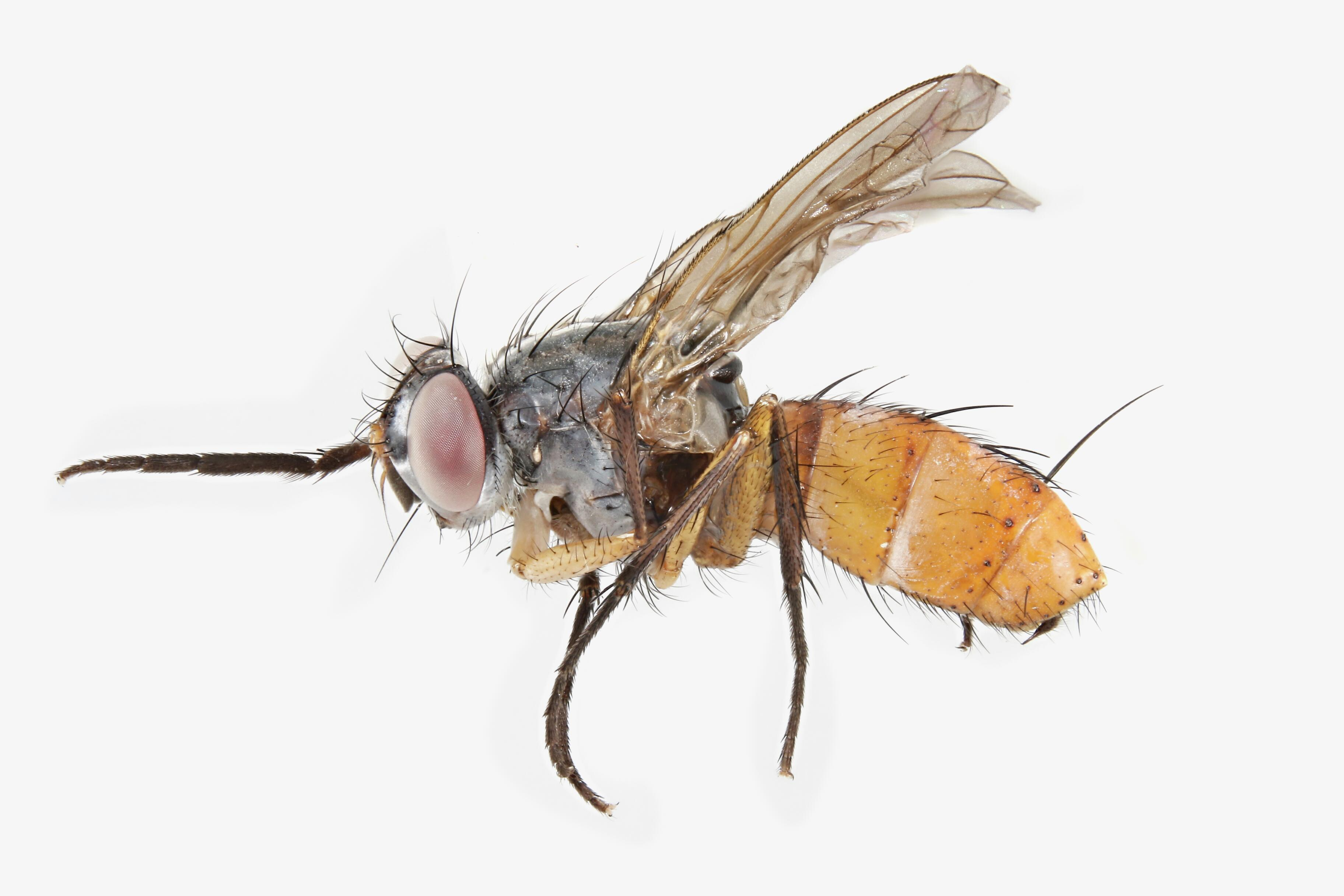

Scientific classification
- Kingdom: Animalia
- Phylum: Arthropoda
- Clade: Pancrustacea
- Class: Insecta
- Order: Diptera
- Family: Tachinidae
- Subfamily: Tachininae
- Tribe: Minthoini
- Genus: Mintho
- Species: M. compressa

Binomial name
- Mintho compressa (Fabricius, 1787)

Synonyms
- Musca compressa Fabricius, 1787

= Mintho compressa =

Species of fly

Mintho compressa is a European species of fly in the family Tachinidae.
