= Paradidyma bicincta =

Scientific classification
- Kingdom: Animalia
- Phylum: Arthropoda
- Class: Insecta
- Order: Diptera
- Family: Tachinidae
- Subfamily: Tachininae
- Tribe: Minthoini
- Genus: Paradidyma
- Species: P. bicincta

Binomial name
- Paradidyma bicincta Reinhard, 1934

Synonyms
- Ceratomyiella bicincta Reinhard, 1934

Species of fly

Paradidyma bicincta is a species of bristle fly in the family Tachinidae.

== Distribution ==
The species is found in the United States and Mexico.
