= Sumpigaster fasciatus =

Scientific classification
- Kingdom: Animalia
- Phylum: Arthropoda
- Class: Insecta
- Order: Diptera
- Family: Tachinidae
- Subfamily: Tachininae
- Tribe: Minthoini
- Genus: Sumpigaster
- Species: S. fasciatus

Binomial name
- Sumpigaster fasciatus Macquart, 1855

Synonyms
- Atractodexia argentifera Bigot, 1885; Mesembriomintho compressa Townsend, 1916

Species of fly

Sumpigaster fasciatus is a species of bristle fly in the family Tachinidae.

== Distribution ==
The species is found in New Caledonia and Australia.
