= Actinochaeta amazonica =

Scientific classification
- Kingdom: Animalia
- Phylum: Arthropoda
- Class: Insecta
- Order: Diptera
- Family: Tachinidae
- Subfamily: Tachininae
- Tribe: Minthoini
- Genus: Actinochaeta
- Species: A. amazonica

Binomial name
- Actinochaeta amazonica Townsend, 1934

Species of fly

Actinochaeta amazonica is a species of tachinid flies in the genus Actinochaeta of the family Tachinidae.

== Distribution ==
Brazil
