= Dyshypostena tarsalis =

Scientific classification
- Kingdom: Animalia
- Phylum: Arthropoda
- Class: Insecta
- Order: Diptera
- Family: Tachinidae
- Subfamily: Tachininae
- Tribe: Minthoini
- Genus: Dyshypostena
- Species: D. tarsalis

Binomial name
- Dyshypostena tarsalis Villeneuve, 1939

Species of fly

Dyshypostena tarsalis is a species of tachinid flies in the genus Dyshypostena of the family Tachinidae.

== Distribution ==
Congo, Ghana, Tanzania, Zimbabwe
