= Vanderwulpia sororcula =

Scientific classification
- Kingdom: Animalia
- Phylum: Arthropoda
- Class: Insecta
- Order: Diptera
- Family: Tachinidae
- Subfamily: Tachininae
- Tribe: Minthoini
- Genus: Vanderwulpia
- Species: V. sororcula

Binomial name
- Vanderwulpia sororcula (Reinhard, 1975)

Synonyms
- Catemophrys sororcula Reinhard, 1975

Species of fly

Vanderwulpia sororcula is a species of bristle fly in the family Tachinidae. It is diurnal

== Distribution ==
Mexico.
