= Mongolomintho =

Scientific classification
- Kingdom: Animalia
- Phylum: Arthropoda
- Class: Insecta
- Order: Diptera
- Family: Tachinidae
- Subfamily: Tachininae
- Tribe: Minthoini
- Genus: Mongolomintho; Richter, 1976

Type species
- Mongolomintho longipes Richter, 1976

Genus of flies

Mongolomintho is a genus of flies in the family Tachinidae.

== Species ==
- Mongolomintho longipes Richter, 1976

== Distribution ==
Mongolia.
