= Dolichopodomintho =

Scientific classification
- Kingdom: Animalia
- Phylum: Arthropoda
- Clade: Pancrustacea
- Class: Insecta
- Order: Diptera
- Family: Tachinidae
- Subfamily: Tachininae
- Tribe: Minthoini
- Genus: Dolichopodomintho; Townsend, 1927

Type species
- Dolichopodomintho dolichopiformis Townsend, 1927

Genus of flies

Dolcihopodomintho is a genus of flies in the family Tachinidae.

== Species ==
- Dolichopodomintho dolichopiformis Townsend, 1927
- Dolichopodomintho takanoi Mesnil, 1973
