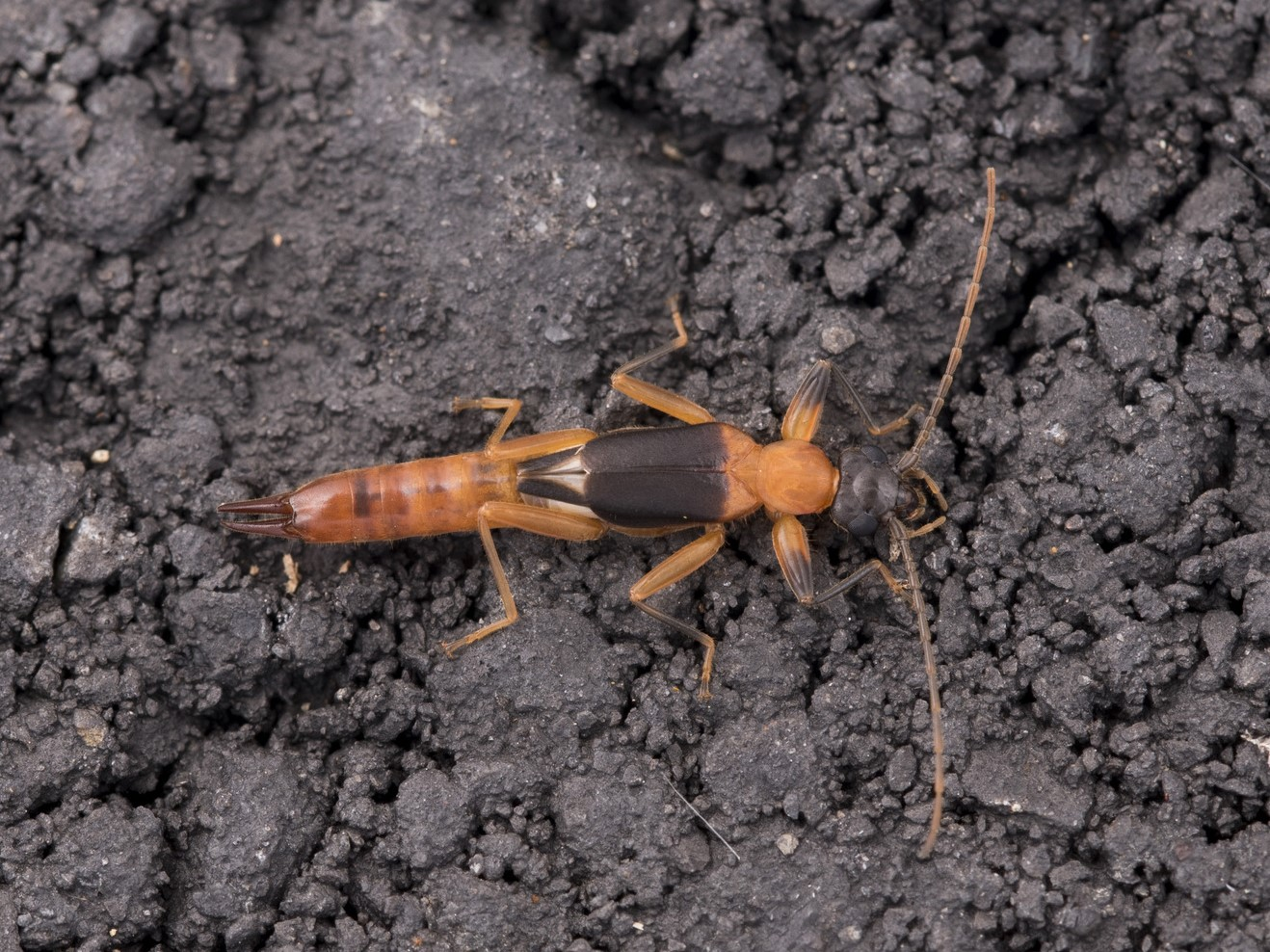
- Diplatys flavicollis

Scientific classification
- Kingdom: Animalia
- Phylum: Arthropoda
- Class: Insecta
- Order: Dermaptera
- Infraorder: Protodermaptera
- Superfamily: Pygidicranoidea
- Family: Diplatyidae
- Subfamily: Diplatyinae
- Genus: Diplatys; Audinet-Serville, 1831

= Diplatys =

Genus of earwigs

Diplatys is a genus of Asian earwigs, in the family Diplatyidae, erected by Jean Guillaume Audinet-Serville in 1831. The recorded distribution of species is from India, southern China and Indochina, although this may be incomplete; it is also worth noting that other genera in subfamily Diplatyinae and the genus Haplodiplatys historically have been placed here.

== Species ==
The Dermaptera Species File lists:

subgenus Diplatys Audinet-Serville, 1831

1. Diplatys baijali Duda & Malhotra, 1970
2. Diplatys beroni Brindle, 1982
3. Diplatys coerulescens Brindle, 1979
4. Diplatys croixi Burr, 1904
5. Diplatys degerboliae Ramamurthi, 1973
6. Diplatys dohrni Burr, 1911
7. Diplatys fella Burr, 1911
8. Diplatys flavobrunneus Chopard, 1924
9. Diplatys hakasonei Nishikawa, 1973
10. Diplatys hayashidai Nishikawa, 1973
11. Diplatys himalayanus Baijal & Singh, 1954
12. Diplatys jawalagiriensis Kapoor, Bharadwaj & Banerjee, 1971
13. Diplatys leleupi Brindle, 1966
14. Diplatys macrocephalus (Palisot de Beauvois, 1805) - type species (as Forficula macrocephala Palisot de Beauvois)
15. Diplatys menoni Kapoor & Bharadwaj, 1968
16. Diplatys nathani Hincks, 1960
17. Diplatys raffrayi Dubrony, 1879
18. Diplatys rehni Hincks, 1955
19. Diplatys ridleyi Kirby, 1903
20. Diplatys saxeus Brindle, 1982
21. Diplatys shirakii Nishikawa, 1973
22. Diplatys taurinus Brindle, 1982
23. Diplatys torrevillasi Srivastava, 1976
24. Diplatys ugandanus Hincks, 1955
25. Diplatys vittatus Bey-Bienko, 1970

subgenus Hypodiplatys Steinmann, 1986

1. Diplatys podiplatys Steinmann, 1986
2. Diplatys bormansi Burr, 1910
3. Diplatys denticulatus Hincks, 1957
4. Diplatys deviensis Srivastava, 1974
5. Diplatys fletcheri Burr, 1910
6. Diplatys javanicus Hincks, 1955

subgenus Neodiplatys Steinmann, 1986

synonym Verhoeffiella Zacher, 1910

1. Diplatys aethiops Burr, 1904
2. Diplatys annandalei Burr, 1911
3. Diplatys borellii Hincks, 1955
4. Diplatys brindlei Steinmann, 1974
5. Diplatys chopardi Hincks, 1955
6. Diplatys dolens Hincks, 1957
7. Diplatys excidens Hincks, 1954
8. Diplatys gedyei Hincks, 1955
9. Diplatys lefroyi Burr, 1910
10. Diplatys longipennis Brindle, 1969
11. Diplatys pictus (Zacher, 1911)
12. Diplatys poonaensis Kapoor, 1968
13. Diplatys popovi Bey-Bienko, 1959
14. Diplatys simplex Hincks, 1961

subgenus Syndiplatys Steinmann, 1986

1. Diplatys adjacens Hincks, 1955
2. Diplatys anamalaiensis Srivastava, 1969
3. Diplatys coelebs Hincks, 1955
4. Diplatys confusus Hincks, 1955
5. Diplatys ernesti Burr, 1910
6. Diplatys fallax Borelli, 1926
7. Diplatys flavicollis Shiraki, 1907
8. Diplatys greeni Burr, 1904
9. Diplatys griffithsi Burr, 1911
10. Diplatys incisus Brindle, 1975
11. Diplatys jacobsoni Burr, 1911
12. Diplatys jogiensis Kapoor, 1968
13. Diplatys liberatus Burr, 1910
14. Diplatys nilgiriensis Hincks, 1955
15. Diplatys propinquus Hincks, 1955
16. Diplatys reconditus Hincks, 1955
17. Diplatys santoshi Srivastava, 1975
18. Diplatys singularis Steinmann, 1986
19. Diplatys sinuatus Hincks, 1955
20. Diplatys truncatus Hincks, 1947
21. Diplatys yunnaneus Bey-Bienko, 1959

incertae sedis

1. Diplatys flavithoracicus Ma & Chen, 1991
2. Diplatys forcipatus Ma & Chen, 1991
3. Diplatys kabakovi Anisyutkin, 1997
4. Diplatys mutiara Kamimura & Nishikawa, 2016
5. Diplatys sahyadriensis Karthik, Kamimura & Kalleshwaraswamy, 2022
6. Diplatys sakaii Gorokhov & Anisyutkin, 1994
7. Diplatys trilous Ma & Chen, 1991
