= Museum of Saint Helena =

Coordinates: 15.9250°S 5.7183°W

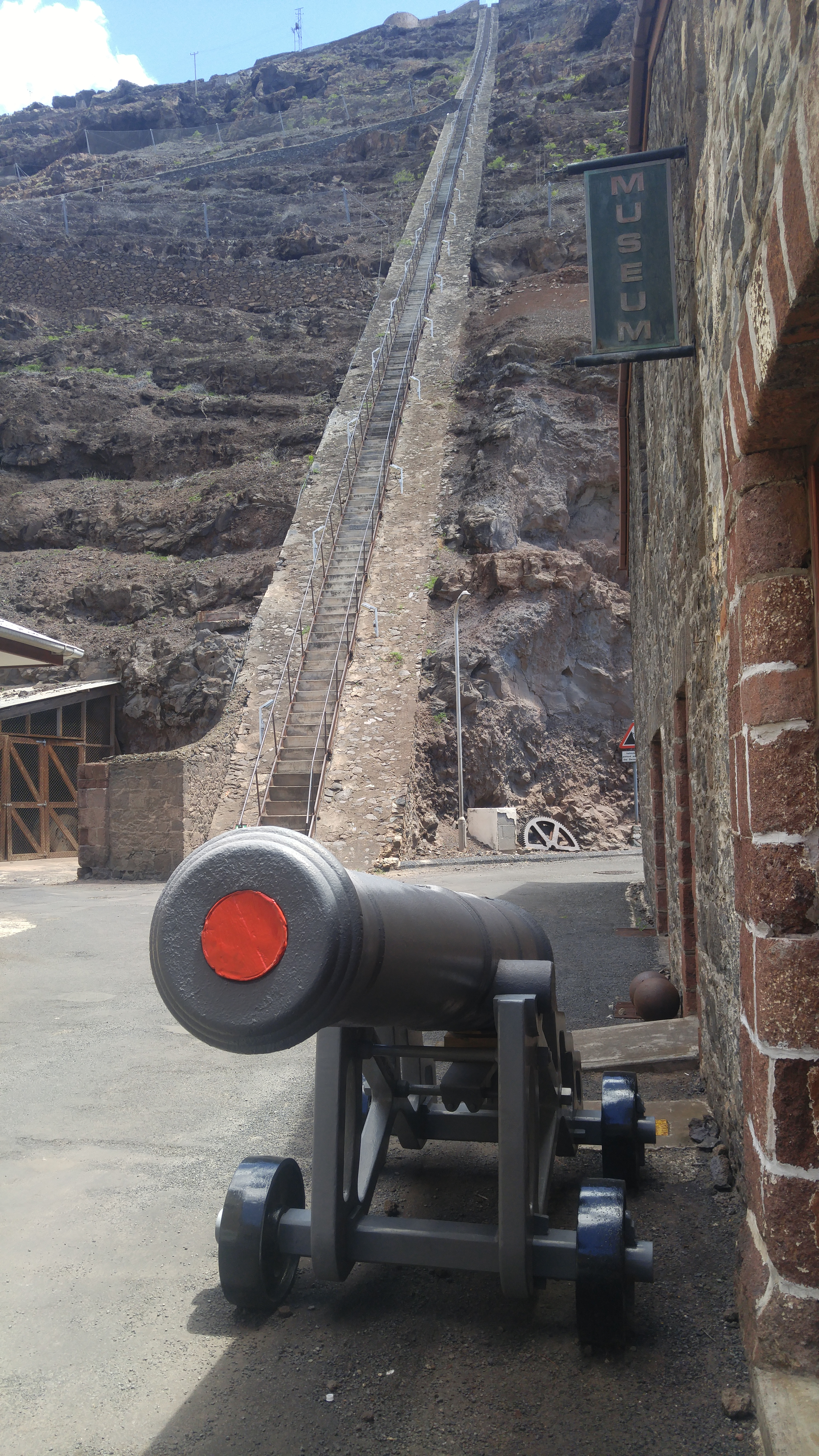
The Museum of Saint Helena is at the foot of Jacob's Ladder (in the background)

The Museum of Saint Helena is a museum on the island of Saint Helena, a British Overseas Territory in the south Atlantic Ocean. It has an extensive collection covering the maritime, military and social history of the island over two floors. It also has a small gift and book shop and an adjoining gallery for temporary exhibits.

== History ==
The museum is managed by the Saint Helena Heritage Society, who were established in November 1979. They opened the museum on 23 May 1980. The museum was originally housed in Broadway House, however as the collection grew significantly, there was the need to find larger premises, and campaigns for a new museum began in 1996. The museum later moved to a late-18th-century stone building, formerly the old power station, at the foot of the hillside stairway, Jacob's Ladder, in lower Jamestown, Saint Helena's capital. Work started in March 2000, and the new museum was officially opened on 21 May 2002, the quincentennial anniversary of the island's discovery, by the Governor, David Hollamby.

Many exhibits in the museum were salvaged from shipwrecks around the island.

The museum is one of two on the island, the other being Longwood House, the house that Napoleon Bonaparte stayed in during his incarceration on St Helena.

There are plans to expand the museum into the adjacent 'PWD Stores' building, to create the St Helena Cultural Centre, which would also incorporate a library and archives.

== Gallery ==
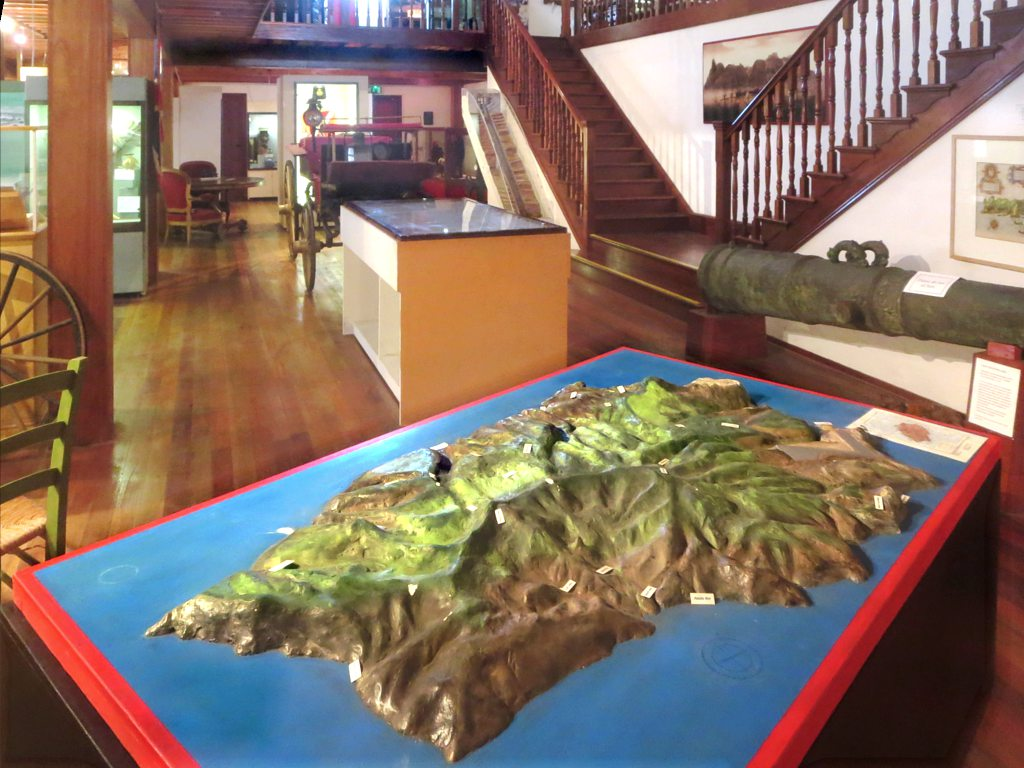
interior

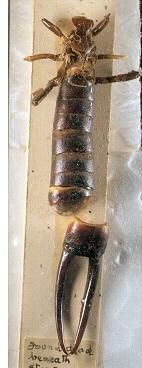
specimen of Labidura herculeana

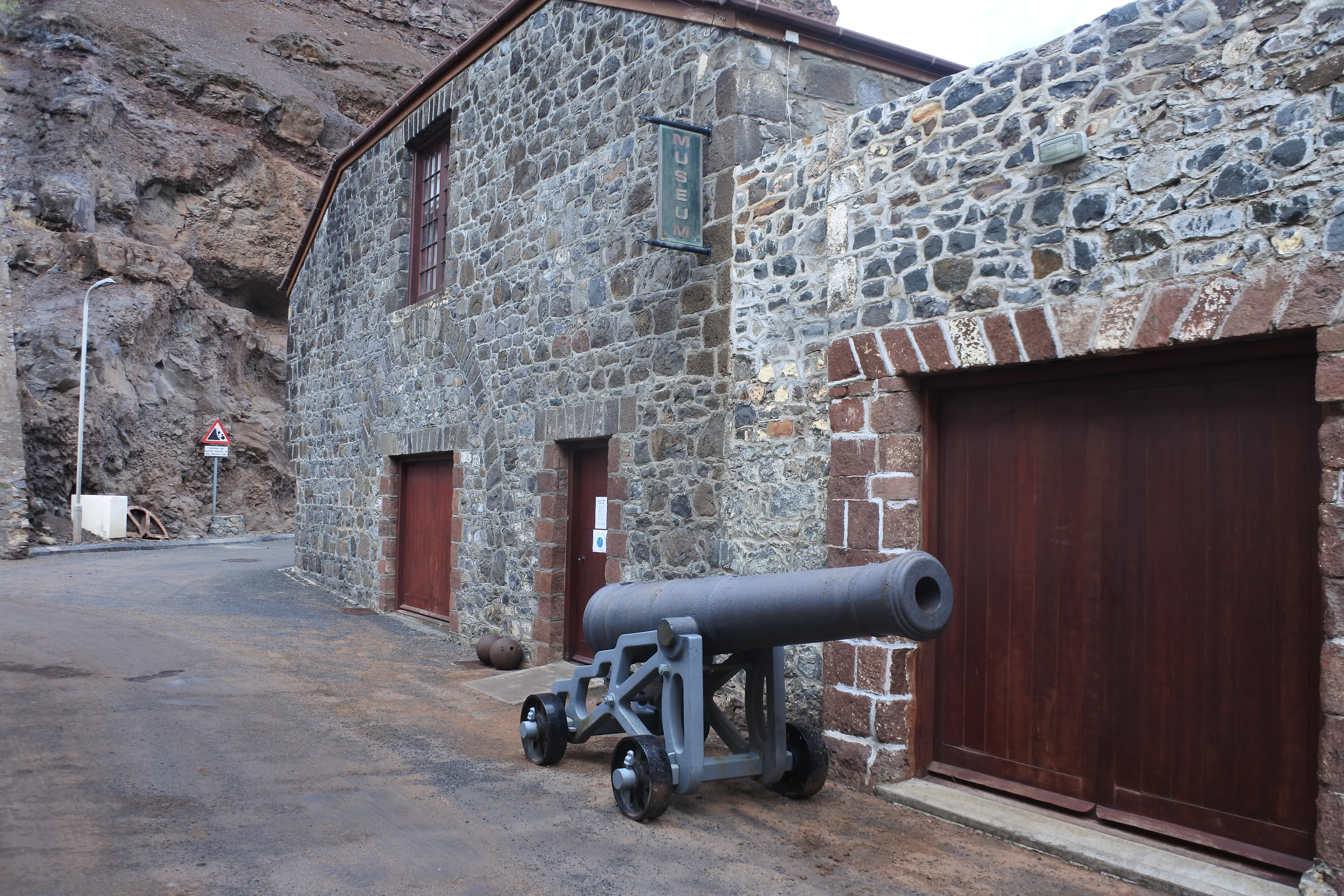
exterior
