= Melanasomyia =

Scientific classification
- Kingdom: Animalia
- Phylum: Arthropoda
- Class: Insecta
- Order: Diptera
- Family: Tachinidae
- Subfamily: Tachininae
- Tribe: Minthoini
- Genus: Melanasomyia; Malloch, 1935

Type species
- Melanasomyia flavipalpis Malloch, 1935

Genus of flies

Melanasomyia is a genus of flies in the family Tachinidae.

== Species ==
- Melanasomyia aberrans (Mesnil, 1957)
- Melanasomyia flavipalpis Malloch, 1935
