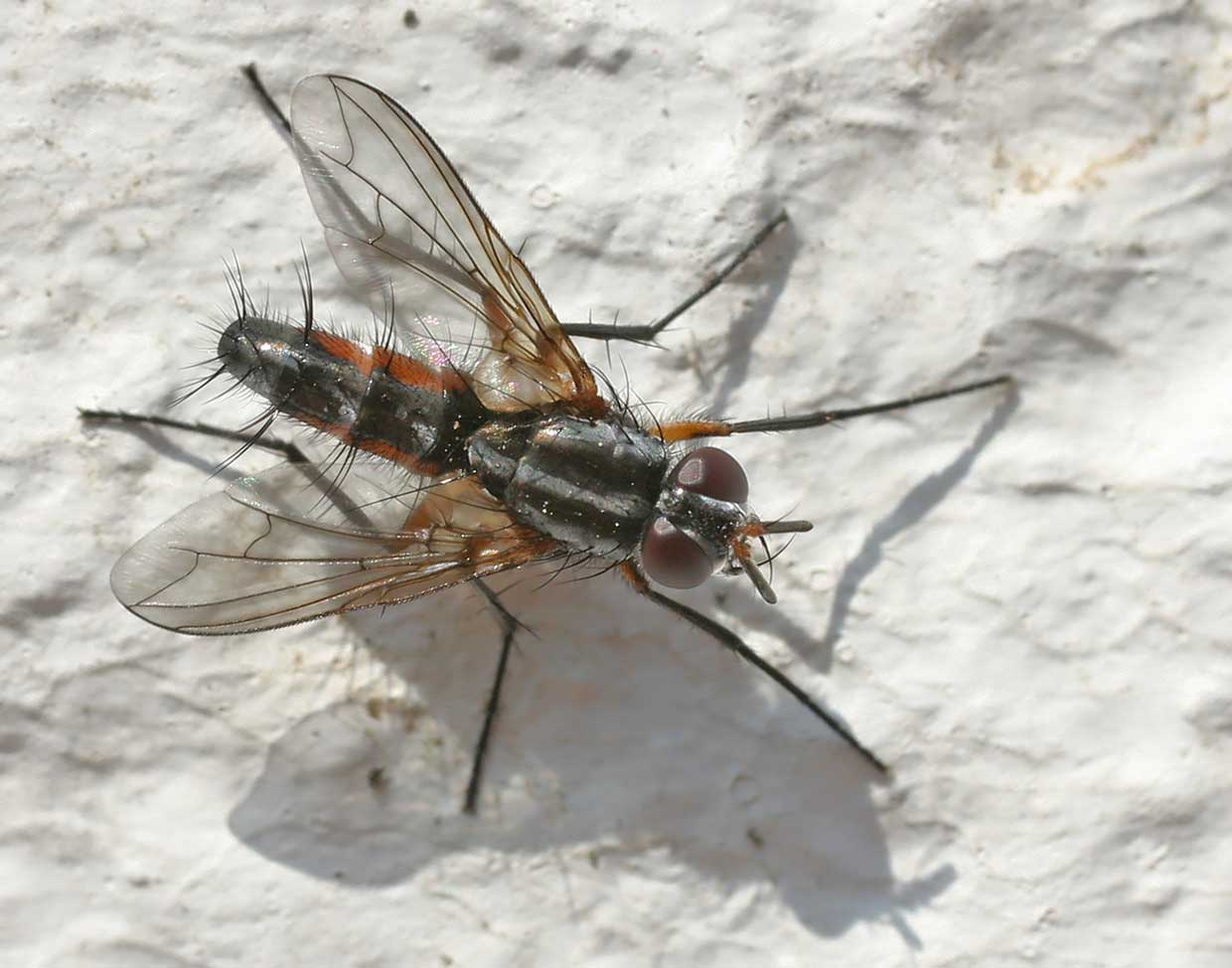
- Macquartia rufiventris
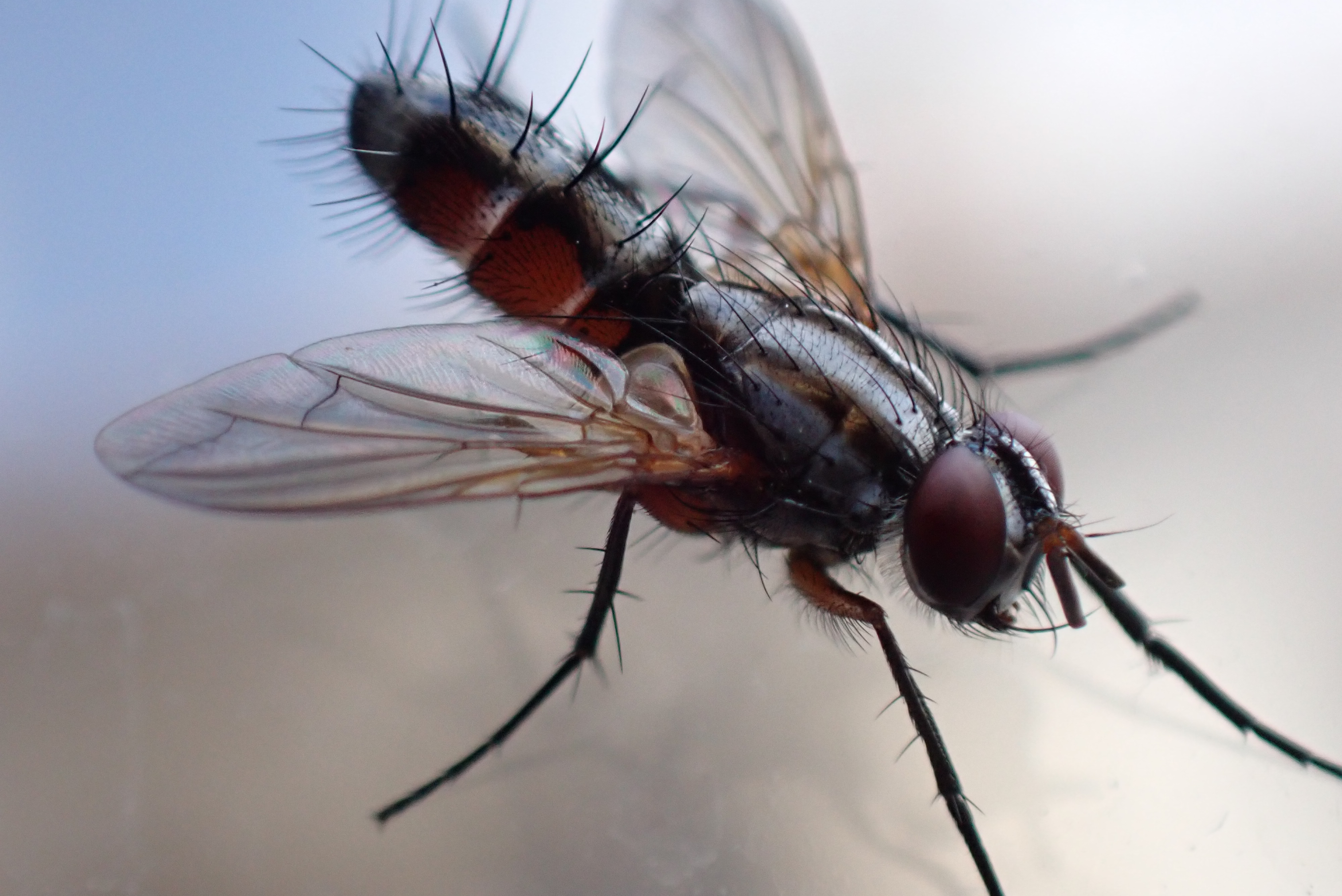
- Mintho rufiventris

Scientific classification
- Kingdom: Animalia
- Phylum: Arthropoda
- Clade: Pancrustacea
- Class: Insecta
- Order: Diptera
- Family: Tachinidae
- Subfamily: Tachininae
- Tribe: Minthoini
- Genus: Mintho
- Species: M. rufiventris

Binomial name
- Mintho rufiventris (Fallén, 1817)

Synonyms
- Musca rufiventris Fallén, 1817; Dexia compressa Walker, 1853

= Mintho rufiventris =

Species of fly

Mintho rufiventris is a European species of fly in the family Tachinidae.
