= Minthoxia =

Scientific classification
- Kingdom: Animalia
- Phylum: Arthropoda
- Clade: Pancrustacea
- Class: Insecta
- Order: Diptera
- Family: Tachinidae
- Subfamily: Tachininae
- Tribe: Minthoini
- Genus: Minthoxia; Mesnil, 1968

Type species
- Minthoxia dasyops Mesnil, 1968

Genus of flies

Minthoxia is a genus of flies in the family Tachinidae.

== Species ==
- Minthoxia dasyops Mesnil, 1968
