= Vanderwulpia =

Scientific classification
- Kingdom: Animalia
- Phylum: Arthropoda
- Class: Insecta
- Order: Diptera
- Family: Tachinidae
- Subfamily: Tachininae
- Tribe: Minthoini
- Genus: Vanderwulpia; Townsend, 1891

Type species
- Vanderwulpia atrophopodoides Townsend, 1891

Synonyms
- Catemophrys Townsend, 1908; Wulpia Brauer & von Berganstamm, 1893

Genus of flies

Vanderwulpia is a genus of flies in the family Tachinidae.

== Species ==
- Vanderwulpia atrophopodoides Townsend, 1891
- Vanderwulpia sequens Townsend, 1892
- Vanderwulpia sororcula (Reinhard, 1975)
