= Promintho =

Scientific classification
- Kingdom: Animalia
- Phylum: Arthropoda
- Clade: Pancrustacea
- Class: Insecta
- Order: Diptera
- Family: Tachinidae
- Subfamily: Tachininae
- Tribe: Minthoini
- Genus: Promintho; Townsend, 1926

Type species
- Promintho sungayana Townsend, 1926

Genus of flies

Promintho is a genus of flies in the family Tachinidae.

== Species ==
- Promintho sungayana Townsend, 1926

== Distribution ==
Sumatra.
