= Ventoplagia =

Scientific classification
- Kingdom: Animalia
- Phylum: Arthropoda
- Class: Insecta
- Order: Diptera
- Family: Tachinidae
- Subfamily: Tachininae
- Tribe: Minthoini
- Genus: Ventoplagia; Richter, 2009

Type species
- Ventoplagia brevirostris Richter, 2009

Genus of flies

Ventoplagia is a genus of flies in the family Tachinidae.

== Species ==
- Ventoplagia brevirostris Richter, 2009

== Distribution ==
Turkmenistan
