= Plesina =

Scientific classification
- Kingdom: Animalia
- Phylum: Arthropoda
- Class: Insecta
- Order: Diptera
- Family: Tachinidae
- Subfamily: Tachininae
- Tribe: Minthoini
- Genus: Plesina; Meigen, 1838

Type species
- Tachina phalerata Meigen, 1824

Synonyms
- Kugleria Verbeke, 1970; Xanthopetia Townsend, 1933

Genus of flies

Plesina is a genus of flies in the family Tachinidae.

== Species ==
- Plesina africana Kugler, 1978
- Plesina asiatica Richter, 1988
- Plesina claripennis Mesnil, 1953
- Plesina deserticola Kugler, 1978
- Plesina fascipennis (Wiedemann, 1830)
- Plesina nepalensis Kugler, 1982
- Plesina nigroscutellata Cerretti & Tschorsnig, 2008
- Plesina phalerata (Meigen, 1824)
- Plesina zimini Richter, 1991
