= Pseudominthodes =

Scientific classification
- Kingdom: Animalia
- Phylum: Arthropoda
- Class: Insecta
- Order: Diptera
- Family: Tachinidae
- Subfamily: Tachininae
- Tribe: Minthoini
- Genus: Pseudominthodes; Townsend, 1933

Type species
- Pseudominthodes scutellaris Townsend, 1933

Genus of flies

Pseudominthodes is a genus of flies in the family Tachinidae.

== Species ==
- Pseudominthodes scutellaris Townsend, 1933

== Distribution ==
South Africa.
