= Rossimyiops =

Scientific classification
- Kingdom: Animalia
- Phylum: Arthropoda
- Class: Insecta
- Order: Diptera
- Family: Tachinidae
- Subfamily: Tachininae
- Tribe: Minthoini
- Genus: Rossimyiops; Mesnil, 1953

Type species
- Rossimyiops whiteheadi Mesnil, 1953

Synonyms
- Mesnilomyia Kugler, 1972; Persedea Richter, 2001

Genus of flies

Rossimyiops is a genus of flies in the family Tachinidae.

== Species ==
- Rossimyiops achilleae (Kugler, 1972)
- Rossimyiops austrinus Cerretti, 2009
- Rossimyiops djerbaensis Cerretti, 2009
- Rossimyiops exquisita (Richter, 2001)
- Rossimyiops longicornis (Kugler, 1972)
- Rossimyiops magnificus (Kugler, 1972)
- Rossimyiops whiteheadi Mesnil, 1953
