= Megistogastropsis =

Scientific classification
- Kingdom: Animalia
- Phylum: Arthropoda
- Clade: Pancrustacea
- Class: Insecta
- Order: Diptera
- Family: Tachinidae
- Subfamily: Tachininae
- Tribe: Minthoini
- Genus: Megistogastropsis; Townsend, 1916

Type species
- Megistogaster wallacei Brauer & von Berganstamm, 1889

Genus of flies

Megistogastropsis is a genus of flies in the family Tachinidae.

== Species ==
- Megistogastropsis alulifera (Walker, 1860)
- Megistogastropsis invita (Walker, 1861)
