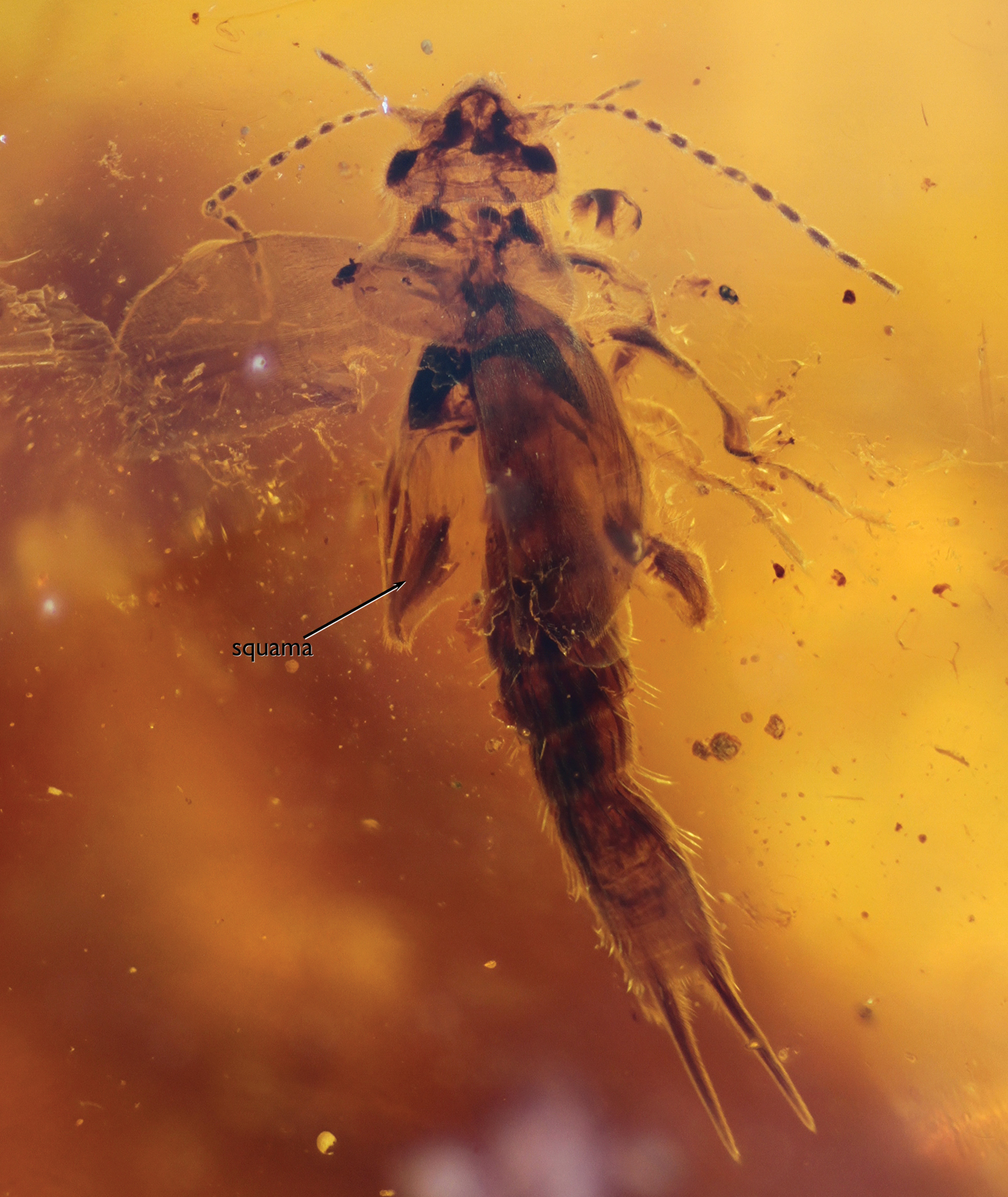
- Astreptolabis ethirosomatia
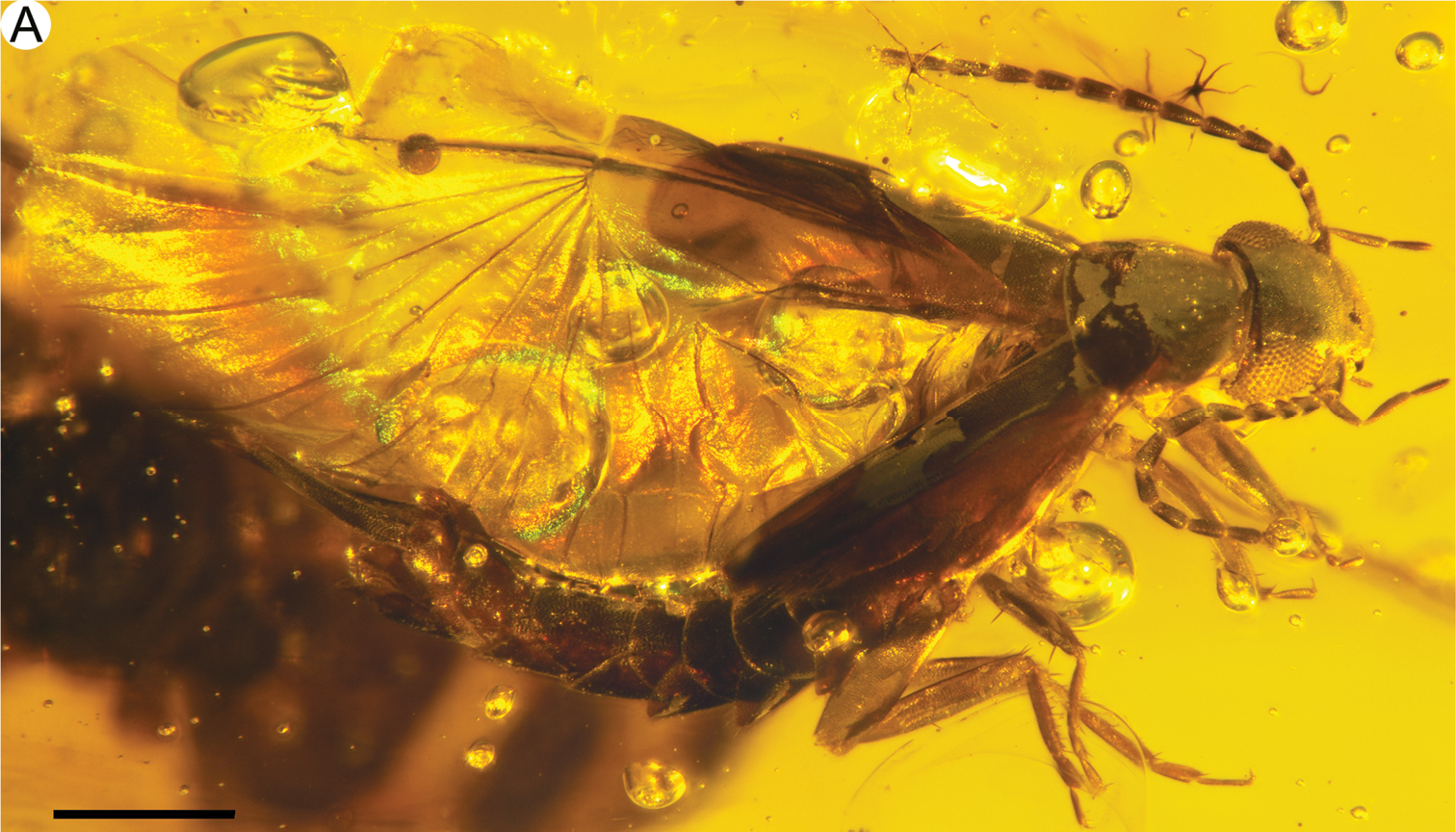
- Astreptolabis laevis holotype

Scientific classification
- Kingdom: Animalia
- Phylum: Arthropoda
- Class: Insecta
- Order: Dermaptera
- Family: Pygidicranidae
- Subfamily: †Astreptolabidinae
- Genus: †Astreptolabis; Engel, 2011

Species
- Astreptolabis ethirosomatia Engel, 2011; Astreptolabis laevis Mao et al, 2020

= Astreptolabis =

Astreptolabis Temporal range: Earliest Cenomanian 99 Ma

Extinct genus of earwigs

Astreptolabis is an extinct genus of earwig in the Dermaptera family Pygidicranidae known from a group of Cretaceous fossils found in Myanmar. The genus contains two described species, Astreptolabis ethirosomatia and Astreptolabis laevis and is the sole member of the subfamily Astreptolabidinae.

== History and classification ==
Astreptolabis ethirosomatia is known only from a single fossil, the holotype, specimen number AMNH Bu-FB20, which is housed in the Amber Fossil Collection of the American Museum of Natural History in New York City. The specimen is composed of a fully complete adult female earwig which has been preserved as an inclusion in a transparent chunk of Burmese amber. The age of the amber deposits in Kachin State of northernmost Burma are understood to be about 100 million years old, placing them in the earliest part of the Cenomanian stage of the Cretaceous. The Astreptolabis ethirosomatia holotype was recovered from outcrops near the city of Myitkyina in Kachin State and was first studied by paleoentomologist Michael S. Engel of the Division of Entomology at the University of Kansas in Lawrence, Kansas. Engel's 2011 type description of the new species was published in the online journal ZooKeys. The genus name Astreptolabis was coined by Engel as a combination of Greek words astreptos, which means "not curved" and labis, which means "forceps". This is in reference to the distinct structuring of the type specimens cerci or "pincers". The specific epithet ethirosomatia is from the Greek words etheira, meaning "hairy" and somation, the diminutive of the Greek word for "body". The subfamily name Astreptolabidinae is derived from the genus name with the suffix -inae added. In 2020 a second species. A. laevis was described.

Several other earwing species have been found in Burmese amber. One other species Tytthodiplatys mecynocercus was described by Engel in the same 2011 paper, while Burmapygia resinata was described by Engel and David Grimaldi in 2004, with a fourth species Myrrholabia electrina first described by Theodore Cockerell in 1920. An additional fifth and sixth species Zigrasolabis speciosa and Toxolabis zigrasi were described by Engel and Grimaldi in 2014 paper.

== Description ==
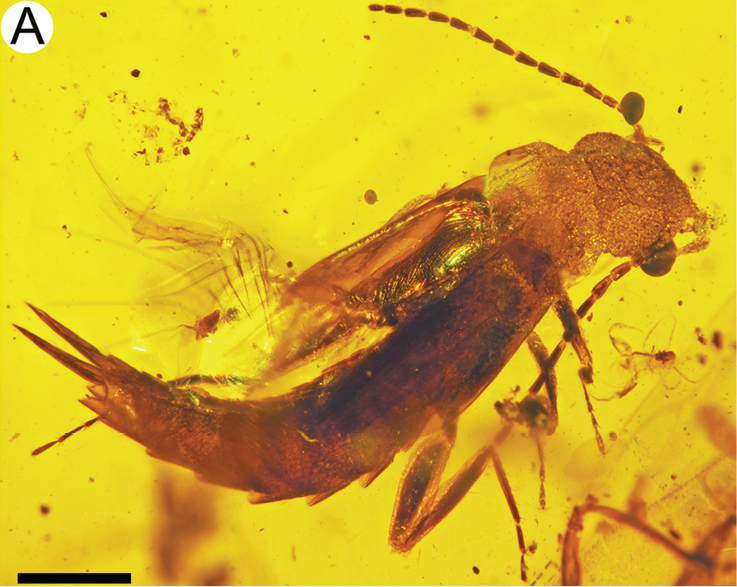
A. laevis paratype

The holotype specimen of Astreptolabis ethirosomatia is a complete adult female with an overall coloration that appears to be mat brown to dark brown. The female is approximately 3.5 millimetres (0.14 in) in length when the cerci are included. The body is overall densely covered in setae that are not thickened enough to be chaetulose. The antennae have a stout scape and are at least fourteen flagellomeres long. As is typical with earwigs, the forewings have been modified into tegma. The tegma cover the four first segments of the abdomen and the abdomen comprises eight visible segments, also typical for female earwigs. The hind wings are present, but due to positioning of the tegma, are mostly obscured. The slender cerci are tubular and straight, tapering along the length to sharp points at the ends. A. laevis is known from a holotype male, it is distinguished from A. ethirosomatia by more sparse setation on the head, pronotum, and tegmina, larger compound eyes and absence of ocular setae.
