= Minthodes =

Scientific classification
- Kingdom: Animalia
- Phylum: Arthropoda
- Class: Insecta
- Order: Diptera
- Family: Tachinidae
- Subfamily: Tachininae
- Tribe: Minthoini
- Genus: Minthodes; Brauer & von Berganstamm, 1889

Type species
- Minthodes pictipennis Brauer & von Berganstamm, 1889

Synonyms
- Myxominthodes Villeneuve, 1932; Pseudomintho Brauer & von Berganstamm, 1889

Genus of flies

Minthodes is a genus of flies in the family Tachinidae.

== Species ==
- Minthodes atra (Kugler, 1971)
- Minthodes brevipennis (Brauer & von Berganstamm, 1889)
- Minthodes diversipes (Strobl, 1899)
- Minthodes latifacies Herting, 1983
- Minthodes numidica Villeneuve, 1932
- Minthodes picta (Zetterstedt, 1844)
- Minthodes pictipennis Brauer & von Berganstamm, 1889
- Minthodes rhodesiana Villeneuve, 1942
- Minthodes rossica (Mesnil, 1963)
- Minthodes setifacies Mesnil, 1939
- Minthodes simulans Herting, 1987
- Minthodes susae Gilasian & Ziegler, 2016
- Minthodes transiens Herting, 1987
