= Actinochaeta =

Scientific classification
- Kingdom: Animalia
- Phylum: Arthropoda
- Class: Insecta
- Order: Diptera
- Family: Tachinidae
- Subfamily: Tachininae
- Tribe: Minthoini
- Genus: Actinochaeta; Brauer & Bergenstamm, 1889

Type species
- Actinochaeta columbiae Brauer & Bergenstamm, 1889

Synonyms
- Actinochaetopsis Townsend, 1934; Paractinochaeta Townsend, 1934; Tapajomintho Townsend, 1934

Genus of flies

Actinochaeta is a genus of tachinid flies in the family Tachinidae.

== Species ==
- Actinochaeta amazonica (Townsend, 1934)
- Actinochaeta carlosalbertoi (Costa Lima, 1926)
- Actinochaeta columbiae Brauer & Bergenstamm, 1889
- Actinochaeta nigriventris (Townsend, 1934)
