= Dyshypostena =

Scientific classification
- Kingdom: Animalia
- Phylum: Arthropoda
- Class: Insecta
- Order: Diptera
- Family: Tachinidae
- Subfamily: Tachininae
- Tribe: Minthoini
- Genus: Dyshypostena; Villeneuve, 1939

Type species
- Dyshypostena tarsalis Villeneuve, 1939

Synonyms
- Kinangopana van Emden, 1960

Genus of flies

Dyshypostena is a genus of flies in the family Tachinidae.

== Species ==
- Dyshypostena edwardsi (van Emden, 1960)
- Dyshypostena tarsalis Villeneuve, 1939
