= Austrophasiopsis =

Scientific classification
- Kingdom: Animalia
- Phylum: Arthropoda
- Class: Insecta
- Order: Diptera
- Family: Tachinidae
- Subfamily: Tachininae
- Tribe: Minthoini
- Genus: Austrophasiopsis; Townsend, 1933

Type species
- Austrophasiopsis formosensis Townsend, 1933

Synonyms
- Kosempomyiella Baranov, 1934

Genus of flies

Austrophasiopsis is a genus of flies in the family Tachinidae.

== Species ==
- Austrophasiopsis caliginosa Shima & Tachi, 2022
- Austrophasiopsis formosensis Townsend, 1933
- Austrophasiopsis luteipennis Mesnil, 1953
