= Sumpigaster =

Scientific classification
- Kingdom: Animalia
- Phylum: Arthropoda
- Class: Insecta
- Order: Diptera
- Family: Tachinidae
- Subfamily: Tachininae
- Tribe: Minthoini
- Genus: Sumpigaster; Macquart, 1855

Type species
- Sumpigaster fasciatus Macquart, 1855

Synonyms
- Atractodexia Bigot, 1885; Eomintho Townsend, 1926; Megistodexia Townsend, 1933; Mesembriomintho Townsend, 1916; Stenodexiopsis Townsend, 1926; Syneplaca Villeneuve, 1938; Synhypostena Villeneuve, 1939; Tachinodexia Townsend, 1933

Genus of flies

Sumpigaster is a genus of flies in the family Tachinidae.

== Species ==
- Sumpigaster bicoloripes (Malloch, 1935)
- Sumpigaster brunnea (Mesnil, 1952)
- Sumpigaster diaristata (Townsend, 1933)
- Sumpigaster equatorialis (Townsend, 1926)
- Sumpigaster fasciatus Macquart, 1855
- Sumpigaster flavipennis (Wiedemann, 1824)
- Sumpigaster pedestris (Villeneuve, 1939)
- Sumpigaster plumicornis (Mesnil, 1957)
- Sumpigaster ruwenzorica (Emden, 1960)
- Sumpigaster subcompressa (Walker, 1853)
- Sumpigaster sumatrensis Townsend, 1926
