= Haplodiplatys =

Scientific classification
- Kingdom: Animalia
- Phylum: Arthropoda
- Class: Insecta
- Order: Dermaptera
- Suborder: Neodermaptera
- Infraorder: Protodermaptera
- Superfamily: Pygidicranoidea
- Family: Haplodiplatyidae; Engel, 2017
- Genus: Haplodiplatys; Hincks, 1955

Genus of earwigs

Haplodiplatys is a genus of Asian earwigs erected by Walter Douglas Hincks in 1955. It is the only member of the monotypic family Haplodiplatyidae, with many species originally placed in the genus Diplatys; a key to them was prepared by Alan Brindle.

== Species ==
The Dermaptera Species File lists:

1. Haplodiplatys basilewskyi (Brindle, 1966)
2. Haplodiplatys bhowmiki (Srivastava & Saha, 1975)
3. Haplodiplatys bhutanensis (Brindle, 1975)
4. Haplodiplatys bidentatus (Hincks, 1955)
5. Haplodiplatys bilobus Bey-Bienko, 1959
6. Haplodiplatys brancuccii Srivastava, 1983
7. Haplodiplatys chinensis (Hincks, 1955)
8. Haplodiplatys convexiusculus Brindle, 1984
9. Haplodiplatys crightoni Ross & Engel, 2013
10. Haplodiplatys darwini Bey-Bienko, 1959
11. Haplodiplatys fengyangensis (Wenbao, 1985)
12. Haplodiplatys flavens (Hincks, 1955)
13. Haplodiplatys glenis (Kapoor, 1968)
14. Haplodiplatys hamatus (Brindle, 1972)
15. Haplodiplatys hincksi Steinmann, 1974
16. Haplodiplatys jansoni (Kirby, 1891)
17. Haplodiplatys kivuensis (Hincks, 1951)
18. Haplodiplatys malaisei (Hincks, 1947)
19. Haplodiplatys niger Hincks, 1955 - type species
20. Haplodiplatys olsufiewi (Borelli, 1932)
21. Haplodiplatys orientalis Steinmann, 1974
22. Haplodiplatys rileyi (Hincks, 1955)
23. Haplodiplatys rufescens (Kirby, 1896)
24. Haplodiplatys ruwenzoricus (Hincks, 1955)
25. Haplodiplatys schawalleri Brindle, 1987
26. Haplodiplatys severus (de Bormans, 1893)
27. Haplodiplatys simlaensis (Kapoor, 1968)
28. Haplodiplatys siva (Burr, 1904)
29. Haplodiplatys srivastavai (Kapoor, 1974)
30. Haplodiplatys stemmleri (Brindle, 1975)
31. Haplodiplatys tibetanus (Hincks, 1955)
32. Haplodiplatys tonkinensis (Hincks, 1955)
33. Haplodiplatys transversalis (Brindle, 1983)
34. Haplodiplatys triangulatus Brindle, 1987
35. Haplodiplatys urbanii (Brindle, 1975)
36. Haplodiplatys viator (Burr, 1904)
