= Magripa =

Scientific classification
- Kingdom: Animalia
- Phylum: Arthropoda
- Class: Insecta
- Order: Diptera
- Family: Tachinidae
- Subfamily: Tachininae
- Tribe: Minthoini
- Genus: Magripa; Richter, 1988

Type species
- Magripa autumnalis Richter, 1988

Genus of flies

Magripa is a genus of flies in the family Tachinidae.

== Species ==
- Magripa autumnalis Richter, 1988
- Magripa persica Gilasian & Ziegler, 2022
