= Diaphoropeza =

Scientific classification
- Kingdom: Animalia
- Phylum: Arthropoda
- Clade: Pancrustacea
- Class: Insecta
- Order: Diptera
- Family: Tachinidae
- Subfamily: Tachininae
- Tribe: Minthoini
- Genus: Diaphoropeza; Townsend, 1908

Type species
- Atrophopoda braueri Williston, 1896

Genus of flies

Diaphoropeza is a genus of flies in the family Tachinidae.

== Species ==
- Diaphoropeza braueri (Williston, 1896)
- Diaphoropeza mayensis Townsend, 1929
- Diaphoropeza peruana Townsend, 1911
