= Ziminia =

Scientific classification
- Kingdom: Animalia
- Phylum: Arthropoda
- Clade: Pancrustacea
- Class: Insecta
- Order: Diptera
- Family: Tachinidae
- Subfamily: Tachininae
- Tribe: Minthoini
- Genus: Ziminia; Mesnil, 1963

Type species
- Ziminia grandipennis Mesnil, 1963

Genus of flies

Ziminia is a genus of flies in the family Tachinidae.

== Species ==
- Ziminia masiceraeformis (Portschinsky, 1881)

== Distribution ==
Tajikistan, Bulgaria, Croatia, Italy, Portugal, Switzerland, Israel, Azerbaijan.
