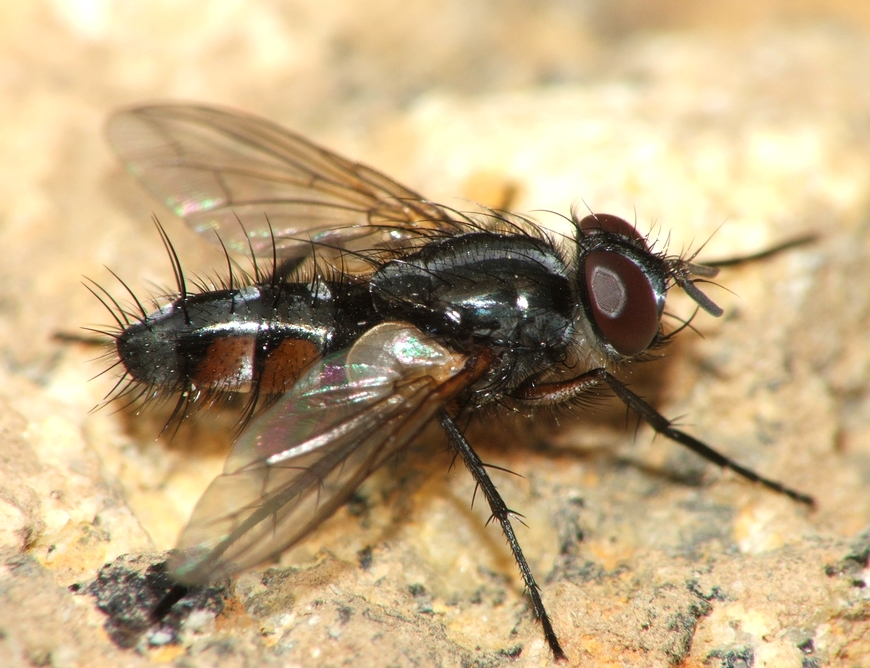
- Mintho rufiventris

Scientific classification
- Kingdom: Animalia
- Phylum: Arthropoda
- Class: Insecta
- Order: Diptera
- Family: Tachinidae
- Subfamily: Tachininae
- Tribe: Minthoini
- Genus: Mintho; Robineau-Desvoidy, 1830

Type species
- Musca compressa Fabricius, 1787

Synonyms
- Mentho Westwood, 1840; Wiedemania Robineau-Desvoidy, 1863; Wiedemannia Meigen, 1838; Agyrtomyia Gistel, 1848

= Mintho =

Genus of flies

Mintho is a genus of flies in the family Tachinidae.

== Species ==
- Mintho argentea Bezzi, 1908
- Mintho compressa (Fabricius, 1787)
- Mintho flavicoxa Bezzi, 1911
- Mintho praeceps (Scopoli, 1763)
- Mintho rufiventris (Fallén, 1817)
