= Palmonia =

Scientific classification
- Kingdom: Animalia
- Phylum: Arthropoda
- Class: Insecta
- Order: Diptera
- Family: Tachinidae
- Subfamily: Tachininae
- Tribe: Minthoini
- Genus: Palmonia; Kugler, 1972

Type species
- Palmonia hermonensis Kugler, 1972

Genus of flies

Palmonia is a genus of flies in the family Tachinidae.

== Species ==
- Palmonia hermonensis Kugler, 1972

== Distribution ==
Sumatera utara
