= Mesnilus =

Scientific classification
- Kingdom: Animalia
- Phylum: Arthropoda
- Class: Insecta
- Order: Diptera
- Family: Tachinidae
- Subfamily: Tachininae
- Tribe: Minthoini
- Genus: Mesnilus; Özdikmen, 2007

Type species
- Ziminiola nigella Mesnil, 1978

Synonyms
- Ziminiola Mesnil, 1978

Genus of flies

Mesnilus is a genus of flies in the family Tachinidae.

== Species ==
- Mesnilus cyanella (Mesnil, 1978)
- Mesnilus hexachaeta (Mesnil, 1978)
- Mesnilus nigella (Mesnil, 1978)
- Mesnilus plumosus (Mesnil, 1978)
- Mesnilus prasinus (Mesnil, 1978)
- Mesnilus setosus (Mesnil, 1978)
