= Actinominthella =

Scientific classification
- Kingdom: Animalia
- Phylum: Arthropoda
- Clade: Pancrustacea
- Class: Insecta
- Order: Diptera
- Family: Tachinidae
- Subfamily: Tachininae
- Tribe: Minthoini
- Genus: Actinominthella; Townsend, 1928

Type species
- Actinominthella atrophopodella Townsend, 1928

Genus of flies

Actinominthella is a genus of flies in the family Tachinidae.

== Species ==
- Actinominthella atrophopodella Townsend, 1928

== Distribution ==
Peru.
