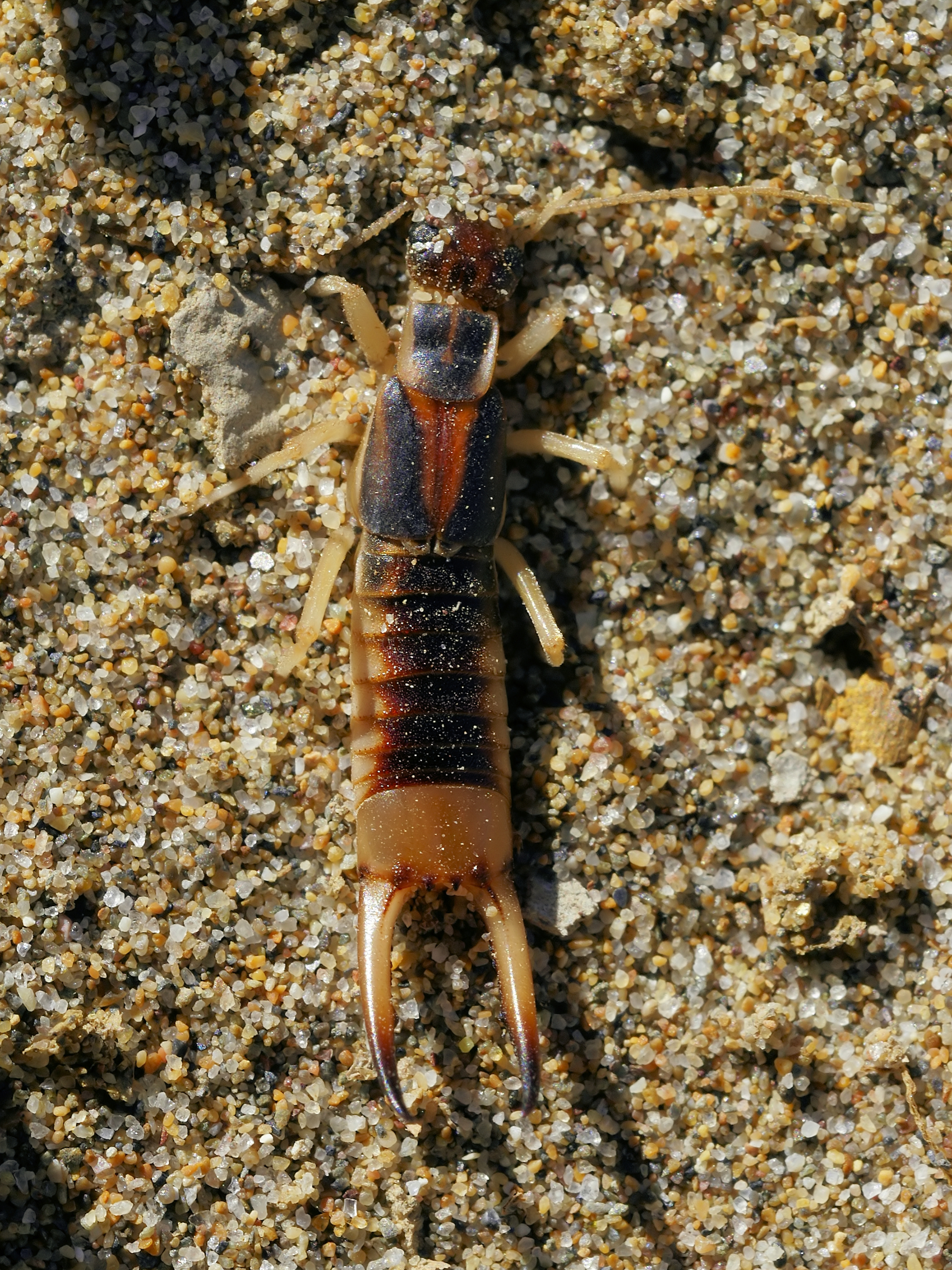
- A Labidura riparia specimen in Ebro Delta, Spain

Scientific classification
- Kingdom: Animalia
- Phylum: Arthropoda
- Clade: Pancrustacea
- Class: Insecta
- Order: Dermaptera
- Family: Labiduridae
- Genus: Labidura
- Species: L. riparia

Binomial name
- Labidura riparia (Pallas, 1773)

= Labidura riparia =

Species of earwig

Labidura riparia is a species of earwig in the family Labiduridae characterized by their modified cerci as forceps, and light tan color. They are commonly known as the shore earwig, tawny earwig, riparian earwig, or the striped earwig due to two dark longitudinal stripes down the length of the pronotum. They are sometimes wrongly referred to as Labidura japonica, although said species is actually a subspecies, Labidura riparia japonica, found from Japan and India to Papua New Guinea. L. riparia are a cosmopolitan species primarily in tropical to subtropical regions. Body size varies greatly, ranging from 16 mm to 30 mm, with 10 abdominal segments. Males and females differ in forcep size, with males having much larger and stronger curve, while females have smaller, straighter forceps with a slight curve at the end. Earwigs use these forceps to assist in predation, defense, sexual selection, courtship and mating, and wing folding.

L. riparia are a subsocial earwig with complex maternal habits. They are voracious predators, and highly regarded as efficient for pest control in many situations. Repugnitory glands in the earwigs cause them to secrete a foul smelling pheromone to deter predators, which is said to smell like decomposition.

Males of this species have two penises in which they can use interchangeably. Individuals have a preference on which they dominantly use though. Just like humans’ limb dexterity, L. riparia have a 90% prevalence of “right-handed” penises. This unequal proportion is unique to this species compared to all other earwigs, and may have a relationship with the spermatheca location on females.

== Ecology ==
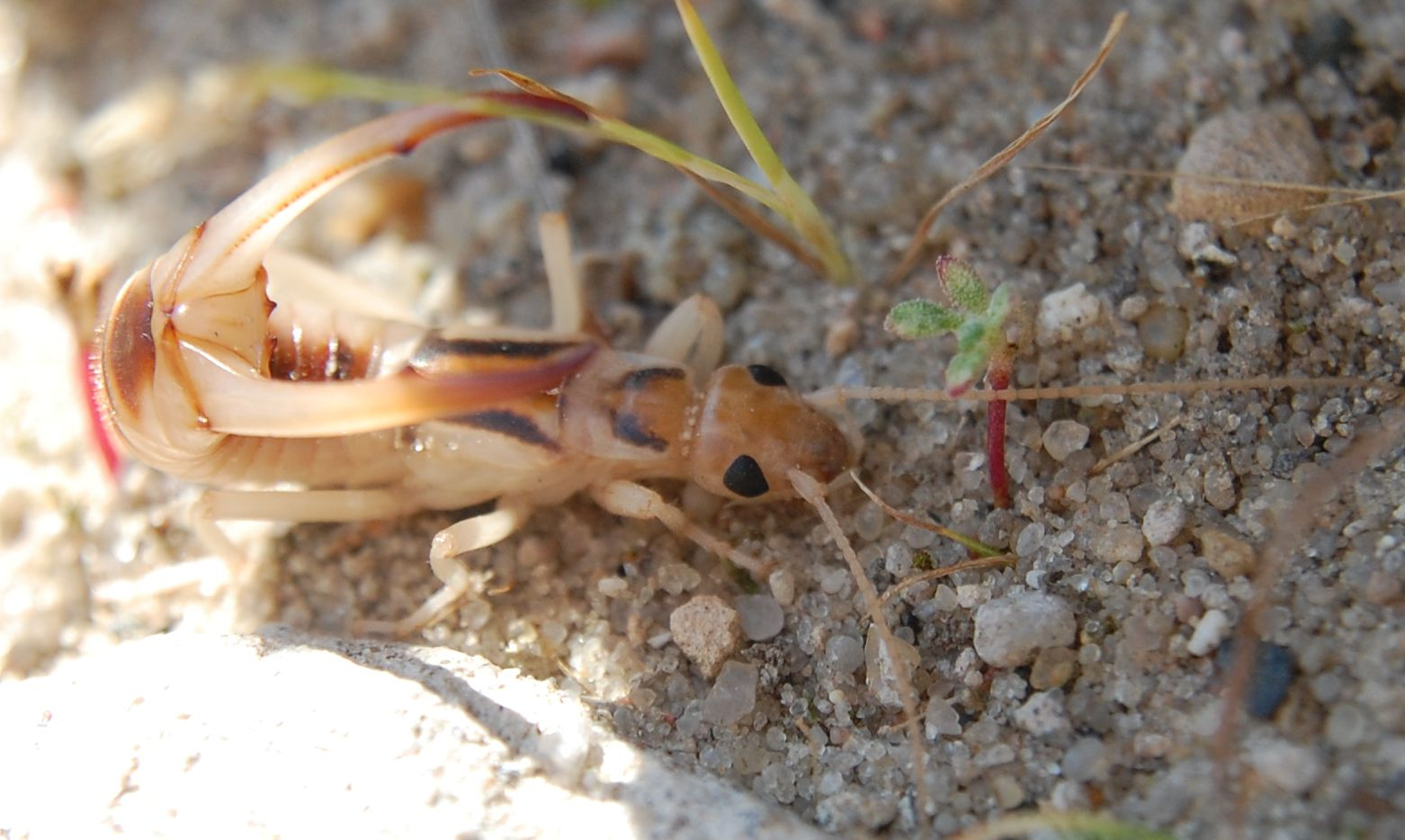
A male Labidura riparia specimen in Köpenick, Berlin, in a threatening pose

The striped earwig prefers dark, moist environments with shelter that it can hide in during the daytime. They can be found in a variety of niches though, from cultured and uncultured farmlands, woodlands, and the margins of ponds and lakes. To save energy, the earwigs will occupy abandoned mole cricket burrows for brooding nests. Individuals are known to fly after a disturbance in search of a new nest as theirs may have become waterlogged or destroyed. Flight towards light has been observed due to their methods of orientation via the moon.

L. riparia are generalist predators whose diet consists entirely of insects or scavenged meat. They have a preference to Lepidoptera larvae and insect eggs, but will eat any available insect. The earwig may use its long and powerful cerci to kill and immobilise larger insects. Because of their flexible eating habits, they easily adapt to any habit as long as there are insect around. In absence of a ready food supply, they have been known to eat nymphs and eggs of their own species. As nocturnal insects, earwigs only hunt after sunset, but feed primarily just after sunset occurs. Feeding habits of females depend more on their ovulatory cycle, and will go long periods of time without eating in preparation of egg laying.

The primary predator to L. riparia is ants, as they prey on unattended eggs. Overlap of predation does occur between organisms though as the earwigs prey on the ant eggs as well, the effect of ants on earwigs seems to be greater than the reverse relationship, as populations of earwigs increase if the ants decrease.

== Nesting and life cycle ==
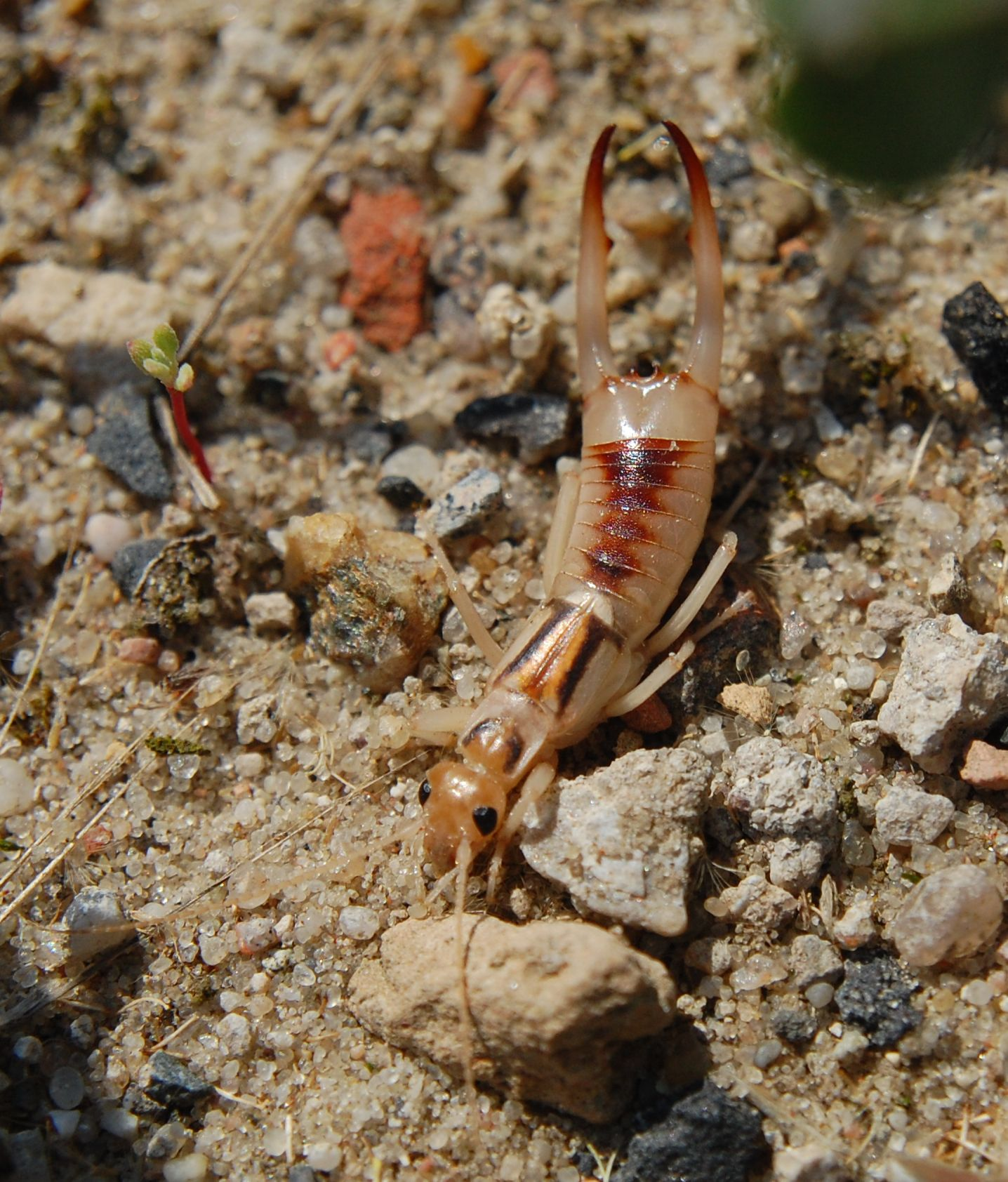
A male Labidura riparia specimen in Köpenick, Berlin

Nests are essential for protection from the environment, and predators, and needed for the success of their offspring's survival. Special nests are dug for molting, feeding, and egg laying. A suitable nest is chosen and dug out by the female under a rock or tree bark. Female earwigs are the primary caregivers as they become hostile to males while in their brooding chambers. While the female is laying her eggs she grabs them and cleans them of any fungi or dirt one by one as they are laid. They do this to 60-100 eggs, and once finished they lay over top of the eggs much like a hen. The female continues to groom the eggs and stay guarding them for 10 days until they begin to hatch. At this time the mother goes in search of food for her young, and continues feeding and grooming them until they leave the nest themselves 2–5 days later. Each female will do this up to three times in her life, sometimes more than one at a time. Some females get lost returning to their brood and start caring for another individual clutch as they are not able to distinguish between their own young and another's. The young will go on to dig their own nest for molting taking anywhere from 4 to 50 days to reach the next instar, repeating to a total of 6 instars before adulthood. Once adults, the individuals will live for only 2–3 months, and begin courting immediately. This is done by a feeling of antennae, and mutual grabbing of each other's abdomens with their forceps until copulation occurs. 2-3 generations will occur in a year, with the last generation hibernating underground through winter.

== See also ==
- List of Dermapterans of Australia
- List of Dermapterans of Sri Lanka
