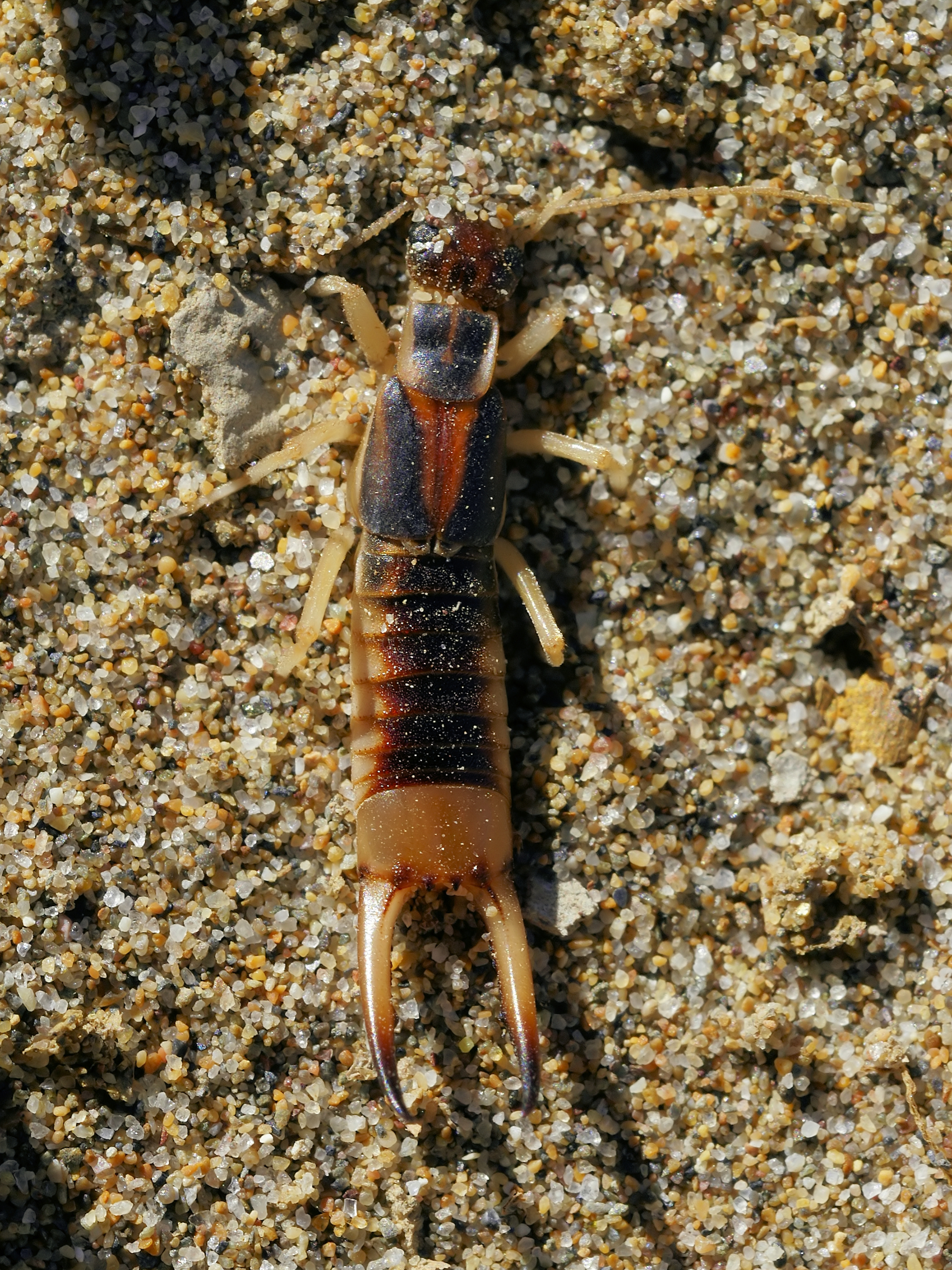
- Labidura riparia

Scientific classification
- Domain: Eukaryota
- Kingdom: Animalia
- Phylum: Arthropoda
- Class: Insecta
- Order: Dermaptera
- Family: Labiduridae
- Subfamily: Labidurinae
- Genus: Labidura; Leach, 1815

Species
- See text

Synonyms
- Demogorgon Kirby, 1891; Forficesila Audinet-Serville, 1831

= Labidura =

Labidura Temporal range: Eocene-Quaternary

Genus of earwigs

Labidura is a genus of earwigs in the family Labiduridae. Probably the earliest specimen of Labidura was found in Eocene amber. Among the Labidura species, Labidura riparia is cosmopolitan, but the Saint Helena earwig (Labidura herculeana) was the largest of all earwigs before its possible extinction after the year of 1967.

== Species ==
The genus contains the following species:

- Labidura cryptera Liu, 1946
- Labidura dharchulensis Gangola, 1968
- Labidura elegans Liu, 1946
- Labidura japonica (Haan, 1842)
- Labidura minor Boeseman, 1954
- Labidura orientalis Steinmann, 1979
- Labidura riparia (Pallas, 1773)
- Labidura xanthopus (Stal, 1855)
- †Labidura herculeana (Fabricius, 1798)
