= Hyperaea =

Scientific classification
- Kingdom: Animalia
- Phylum: Arthropoda
- Class: Insecta
- Order: Diptera
- Family: Tachinidae
- Subfamily: Tachininae
- Tribe: Minthoini
- Genus: Hyperaea; Robineau-Desvoidy, 1863

Synonyms
- Cylindrogaster Rondani, 1861; Cylindrosoma Rondani, 1856

Genus of flies

Hyperaea is a genus of flies in the family Tachinidae.

== Species ==
- Hyperaea femoralis (Meigen, 1824)
- Hyperaea fuscipennis (Macquart, 1847)
- Hyperaea sanguinea (Meigen, 1824)
- Hyperaea tonsa (Loew, 1847)
