= Xiphochaeta (fly) =

Scientific classification
- Kingdom: Animalia
- Phylum: Arthropoda
- Class: Insecta
- Order: Diptera
- Family: Tachinidae
- Subfamily: Tachininae
- Tribe: Minthoini
- Genus: Xiphochaeta; Mesnil, 1968

Type species
- Xiphochaeta longicornis Mesnil, 1968

Genus of flies

Xiphochaeta is a genus of flies in the family Tachinidae.

== Species ==
- Xiphochaeta atratula Mesnil, 1968
- Xiphochaeta delicatula Mesnil, 1968
- Xiphochaeta heteronychia Mesnil, 1968
- Xiphochaeta longicornis Mesnil, 1968
- Xiphochaeta macronychia Mesnil, 1968
- Xiphochaeta paucibarba Mesnil, 1968
- Xiphochaeta reducta Mesnil, 1968
- Xiphochaeta velutina Mesnil, 1968
