= Paradidyma =

Scientific classification
- Kingdom: Animalia
- Phylum: Arthropoda
- Clade: Pancrustacea
- Class: Insecta
- Order: Diptera
- Family: Tachinidae
- Subfamily: Tachininae
- Tribe: Minthoini
- Genus: Paradidyma; Brauer & von Berganstamm, 1891

Type species
- Didyma validinervis Wulp, 1890

Synonyms
- Atrophopalpus Townsend, 1892; Atrophopoda Townsend, 1891; Ceratomyiella Townsend, 1891; Lachnomma Townsend, 1892; Lachnommopsis Townsend, 1915; Lachnomopsis Guimarães, 1971; Metallicomintho Townsend, 1919; Microchira Brauer & von Berganstamm, 1893; Micromintho Townsend, 1919; Phytoadmontia Townsend, 1916

Genus of flies

Paradidyma is a genus of flies in the family Tachinidae.

== Species ==
- Paradidyma affinis Reinhard, 1934
- Paradidyma albifacies (Wulp, 1892)
- Paradidyma aldrichi Reinhard, 1934
- Paradidyma angusticornis (Townsend, 1892)
- Paradidyma apicalis Reinhard, 1934
- Paradidyma aristalis Reinhard, 1934
- Paradidyma armata (Townsend, 1915)
- Paradidyma atatula (Walker, 1853)
- Paradidyma bicincta (Reinhard, 1934)
- Paradidyma brasiliana (Brauer & von Berganstamm, 1891)
- Paradidyma brasiliana Reinhard, 1934
- Paradidyma cinerescens Reinhard, 1934
- Paradidyma conica (Townsend, 1891)
- Paradidyma contigua (Wulp, 1890)
- Paradidyma crassiseta Reinhard, 1934
- Paradidyma derelicta Reinhard, 1934
- Paradidyma jamaicensis (Curran, 1928)
- Paradidyma melania (Townsend, 1919)
- Paradidyma merista Reinhard, 1953
- Paradidyma mexicana (Brauer & von Berganstamm, 1893)
- Paradidyma neglecta (West, 1925)
- Paradidyma neomexicana Reinhard, 1934
- Paradidyma obliqua Reinhard, 1934
- Paradidyma orbitalis (Reinhard, 1934)
- Paradidyma orbitalis Coquillett, 1904
- Paradidyma peruana (Townsend, 1928)
- Paradidyma peruviana Townsend, 1928
- Paradidyma petiolata Reinhard, 1934
- Paradidyma piliventris Reinhard, 1934
- Paradidyma recincta Reinhard, 1964
- Paradidyma reinhardi Wood, 1998
- Paradidyma rufipes (Curran, 1926)
- Paradidyma rufopalpus (Curran, 1926)
- Paradidyma setigera (Coquillett, 1904)
- Paradidyma townsendi (Williston, 1896)
- Paradidyma trifasciata (Wulp, 1890)
- Paradidyma validinervis (Wulp, 1890)
