= Xiphochaeta aquatica =

Scientific classification
- Kingdom: Plantae
- Clade: Embryophytes
- Clade: Tracheophytes
- Clade: Angiosperms
- Clade: Eudicots
- Clade: Asterids
- Order: Asterales
- Family: Asteraceae
- Subfamily: Vernonioideae
- Tribe: Vernonieae
- Genus: Xiphochaeta; Poepp.
- Species: X. aquatica

Binomial name
- Xiphochaeta aquatica Poepp.

Synonyms
- Stilpnopappus viridis Benth. ex Baker; Stilpnopappus aquaticus (Poepp.) M.O.Dillon

Genus of flowering plants

Xiphochaeta is a genus of South American plants in the tribe Vernonieae within the family Asteraceae.

Species

The only known species is Xiphochaeta aquatica, native to Peru, Bolivia, Brazil, Venezuela, Guyana, Suriname, and French Guiana.
