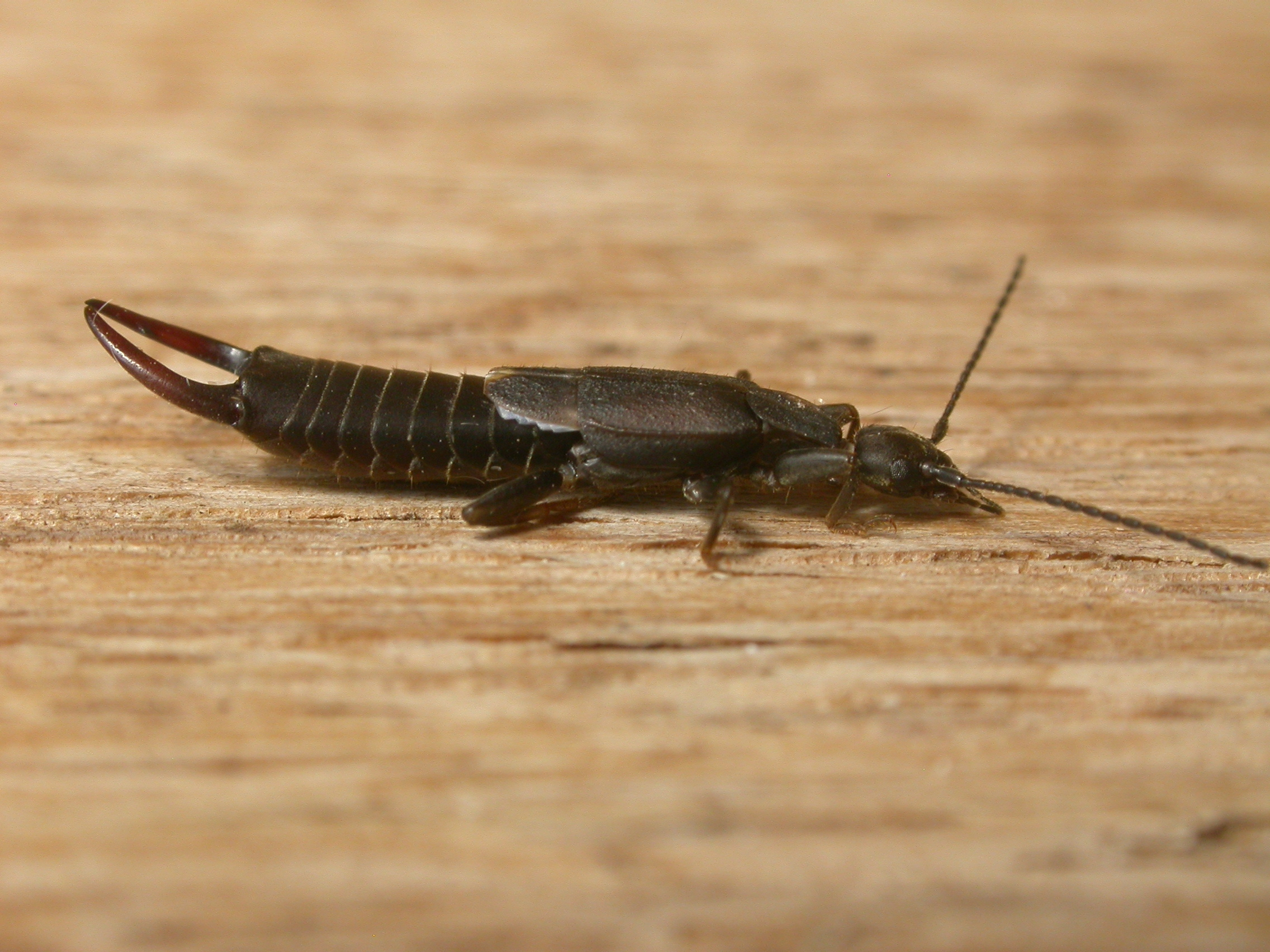
- Nala lividipes

Scientific classification
- Kingdom: Animalia
- Phylum: Arthropoda
- Class: Insecta
- Order: Dermaptera
- Suborder: Neodermaptera
- Infraorder: Epidermaptera
- Superfamily: Labiduroidea; Verhoeff, 1902
- Family: Labiduridae; Verhoeff, 1902

Genera
- See text

= Labiduridae =

Labiduridae Temporal range: Albian–recent

Family of earwigs

Labiduridae, whose members are known commonly as striped earwigs, is a relatively large family of earwigs in the suborder Neodermaptera.

== Taxonomy ==
The family contains a total of approximately 72 species, spread across seven genera in three subfamilies. Some well-known members of the family include Labidura riparia, commonly known as the tawny earwig, and Gonolabidura meteor. The family is mostly cosmopolitan, so it can be found around the world. At least two species have been described from middle Cretaceous aged Burmese amber, Myrrholabia and Zigrasolabis.

== Description ==
The family's members are moderate to large earwigs, and are cylindrically shaped with well-developed wings. They have especially long antennae, while some segments can be shorter, and large cerci.

== Genera ==
The family contains the following genera:

- Subfamily Allostethinae Verhoeff, 1904
  - Allostethella Zacher, 1910
  - Allostethus Verhoeff, 1904
  - Gonolabidura Zacher, 1910
  - Protolabidura Steinmann, 1985
- Subfamily Labidurinae Verhoeff, 1902
  - Forcipula Bolivar, 1897
  - Labidura Leach, 1815
  - Tomopygia Burr, 1904
  - †Myrrholabia Engel & Grimaldi, 2004 Burmese amber, Myanmar, Cenomanian
  - †Zigrasolabis Engel and Grimaldi 2014 Burmese amber, Myanmar, Cenomanian
- Subfamily Nalinae Steinmann, 1975
  - Nala Zacher, 1910
- Incertae sedis
  - †Caririlabia Martins-Neto, 1990 Crato Formation, Brazil, Aptian
  - †Labiduromma Scudder 1885 Florissant, Colorado, Eocene
