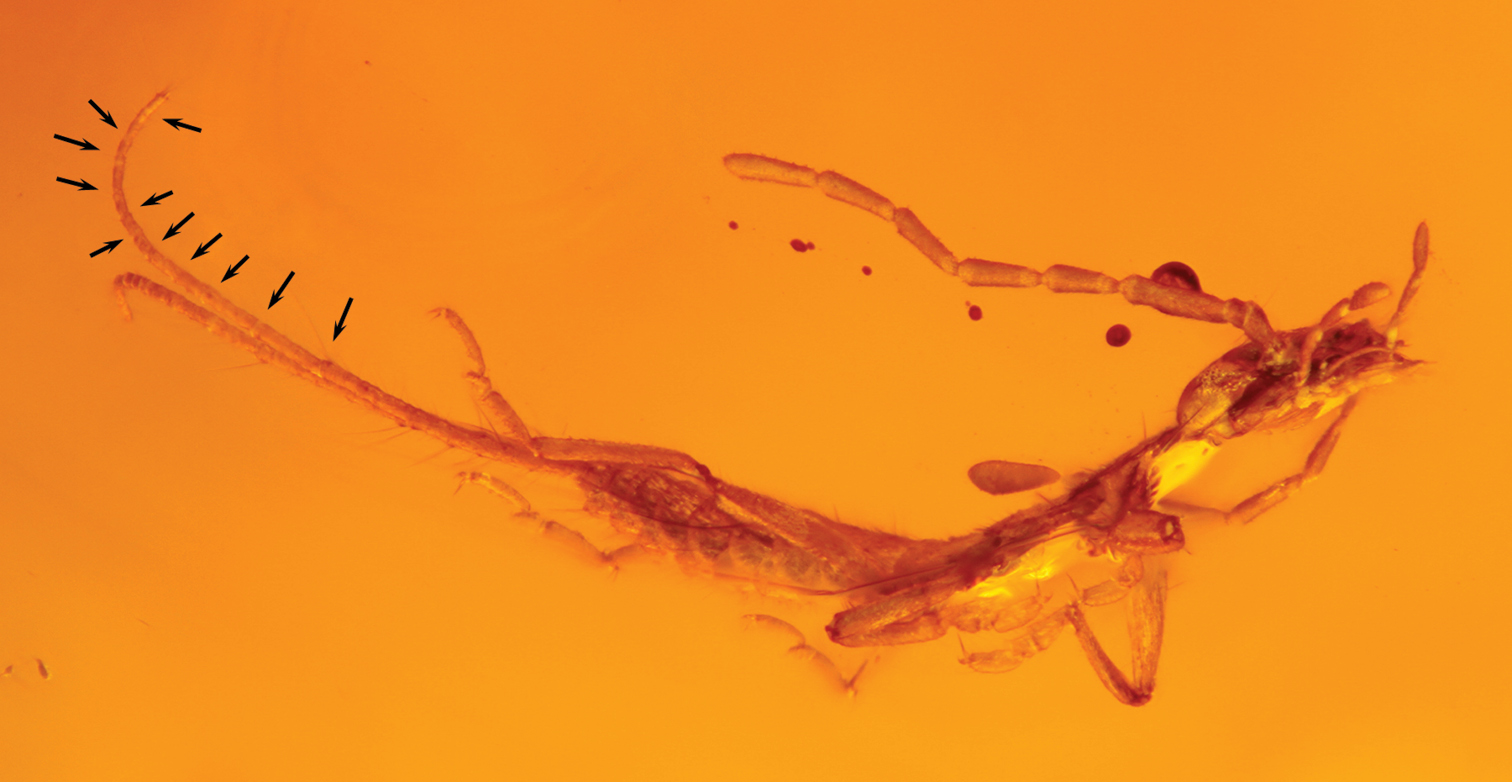

Scientific classification
- Kingdom: Animalia
- Phylum: Arthropoda
- Class: Insecta
- Order: Dermaptera
- Family: Diplatyidae
- Genus: †Tytthodiplatys
- Species: †T. mecynocercus

Binomial name
- †Tytthodiplatys mecynocercus Engel, 2011

= Tytthodiplatys =

Tytthodiplatys Temporal range: Albian

Extinct genus of earwigs

Tytthodiplatys is an extinct genus of earwig in the family Diplatyidae known from a Cretaceous fossil found in Myanmar. The genus contains a single described species, Tytthodiplatys mecynocercus.

== History and classification ==
Tytthodiplatys is known only from a single fossil, the holotype, specimen number AMNH Bu-FB75, which is housed in the Amber Fossil Collection of the American Museum of Natural History in New York City. The specimen is composed of a fully complete first instar female earwig which has been preserved as an inclusion in a transparent chunk of Burmese amber. The age of the amber deposits in Kachin State in northernmost Burma are understood to be at least 100 million years old, placing them in the Albian age of the Cretaceous. The Tytthodiplatys holotype was recovered from outcrops near the city of Myitkyina in Kachin State and was first studied by paleoentomologist Michael S. Engel of the Division of Entomology at the University of Kansas in Lawrence, Kansas. Engel's 2011 type description of the new species was published in the online journal ZooKeys. The genus name Tytthodiplatys was coined by Engel as a combination of three Greek words, tytthos which means "small" or "young", di which means "two" and platys meaning "broad". The specific epithet mecynocercus is from the Greek words mekyno and kerkos which translate as "prolong" and "tail" respectively. Tytthodiplatys is one of four described earwig species found in Burmese amber. One other species Astreptolabis ethirosomatia was described by Engel in the same 2011 paper, while Burmapygia resinata was described by Engel and David Grimaldi in 2004, with the last species Myrrholabia electrina first being described by Theodore Cockerell in 1920. At the time of description, Tytthodiplatys was the oldest confirmed member of the family Diplatyidae.

== Description ==
The holotype specimen of Tytthodiplatys is a first instar female with an overall coloration that appears to be matt brown. The female is approximately 1.9 millimetres (0.075 in) in length when the cerci are excluded, and a total of 3.48 millimetres (0.137 in) in length when the cerci are included. The body is overall dotted with sparsely scattered groups of setae which are not thickened enough to be chaetulose. The antennae have a fairly slender scape and are the typical eight flagellomeres long as normally seen in first instar earwigs. The legs are uniformly smooth, lacking any bristles or spines, except for a few scattered setae that are found on the upper side of the profemora. The cerci host a number of stiff and elongated setae on the cercomeres.
