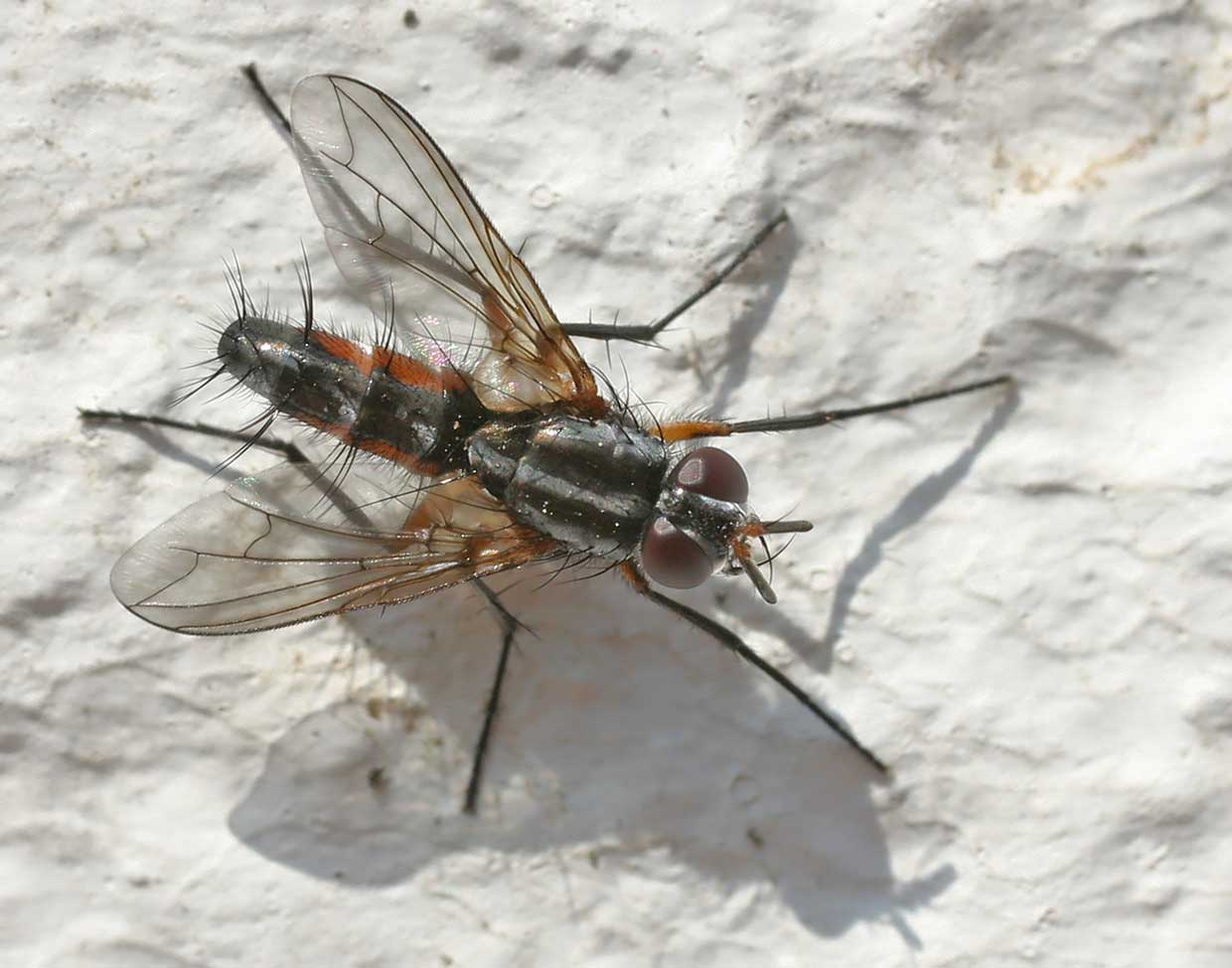
- Mintho rufiventris

Scientific classification
- Kingdom: Animalia
- Phylum: Arthropoda
- Clade: Pancrustacea
- Class: Insecta
- Order: Diptera
- Family: Tachinidae
- Subfamily: Tachininae
- Tribe: Minthoini

= Minthoini =

Tribe of flies

Minthoini is a tribe of flies in the family Tachinidae.

== Genera ==
- Actinochaeta Brauer & von Bergenstamm, 1889
- Actinominthella Townsend, 1928
- Austrophasiopsis Townsend, 1933
- Diaphoropeza Townsend, 1908
- Dolichopodomintho Townsend, 1927
- Dyshypostena Villeneuve, 1939
- Hyperaea Robineau-Desvoidy, 1863
- Magripa Richter, 1988
- Megistogastropsis Townsend, 1916
- Melanasomyia Malloch, 1935
- Mesnilus Özdikmen, 2007
- Mintho Robineau-Desvoidy, 1830
- Minthodes Brauer & von Bergenstamm, 1889
- Minthoxia Mesnil, 1968
- Mongolomintho Richter, 1976
- Neometachaeta Townsend, 1915
- Palmonia Kugler, 1972
- Paradidyma Brauer & von Bergenstamm, 1891
- Plesina Meigen, 1838
- Promintho Townsend, 1926
- Pseudominthodes Townsend, 1933
- Rossimyiops Mesnil, 1953
- Sumpigaster Macquart, 1855
- Tipulidomima Townsend, 1933
- Vanderwulpia Townsend, 1891
- Ventoplagia Richter, 2009
- Xiphochaeta Mesnil, 1968
- Ziminia Mesnil, 1963
