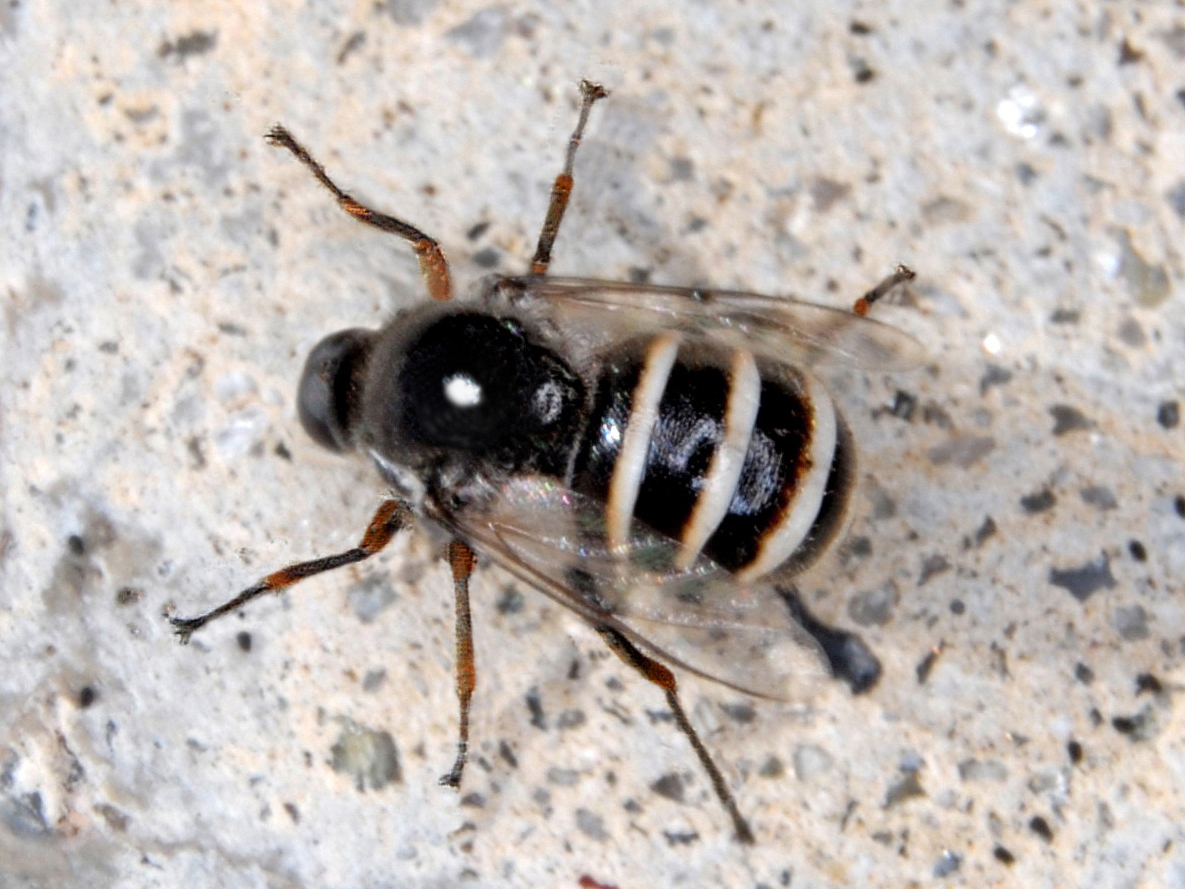
- Ogcodes zonatus. Dorsal view
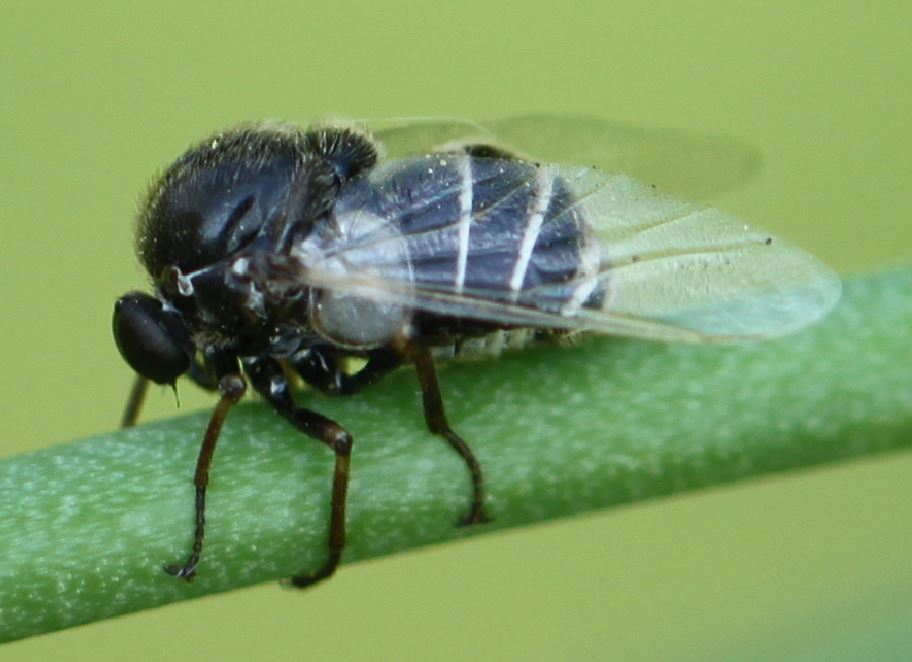
- Side view

Scientific classification
- Kingdom: Animalia
- Phylum: Arthropoda
- Class: Insecta
- Order: Diptera
- Family: Acroceridae
- Genus: Ogcodes
- Species: O. zonatus

Binomial name
- Ogcodes zonatus Erichson, 1840

= Ogcodes zonatus =

Species of fly

Ogcodes zonatus is a species of insect in the family Acroceridae, the small-headed flies.

== Distribution ==
This species is present in Europe, Russia, Turkey, Iran, Algeria and Mongolia.

== Description ==
Ogcodes zonatus can reach a body length of approximately 4–7 millimetres (0.16–0.28 in). These flies are characterized by a globular body, very small and dark heads and by translucent wings. The contiguous eyes occupy in both sexes the entire head. A long ventral proboscis is present only in the feeding imagos. The domed thorax is black, with partly brown hairs, where as the abdomen has black and white transversal bands. The rear pair of legs is curved, thickened at the end, with a brown colour.

This species is very similar to Ogcodes pallipes, that has monocolor femurs, and to Ogcodes gibbosus, that shows different shapes of the bands on tergites, yellowish halteres knob and transparent margin of the calypter.

== Biology ==
Adults are active from June to August. This species is a parasitoid of Salticidae spiders (Heliophanus species).
