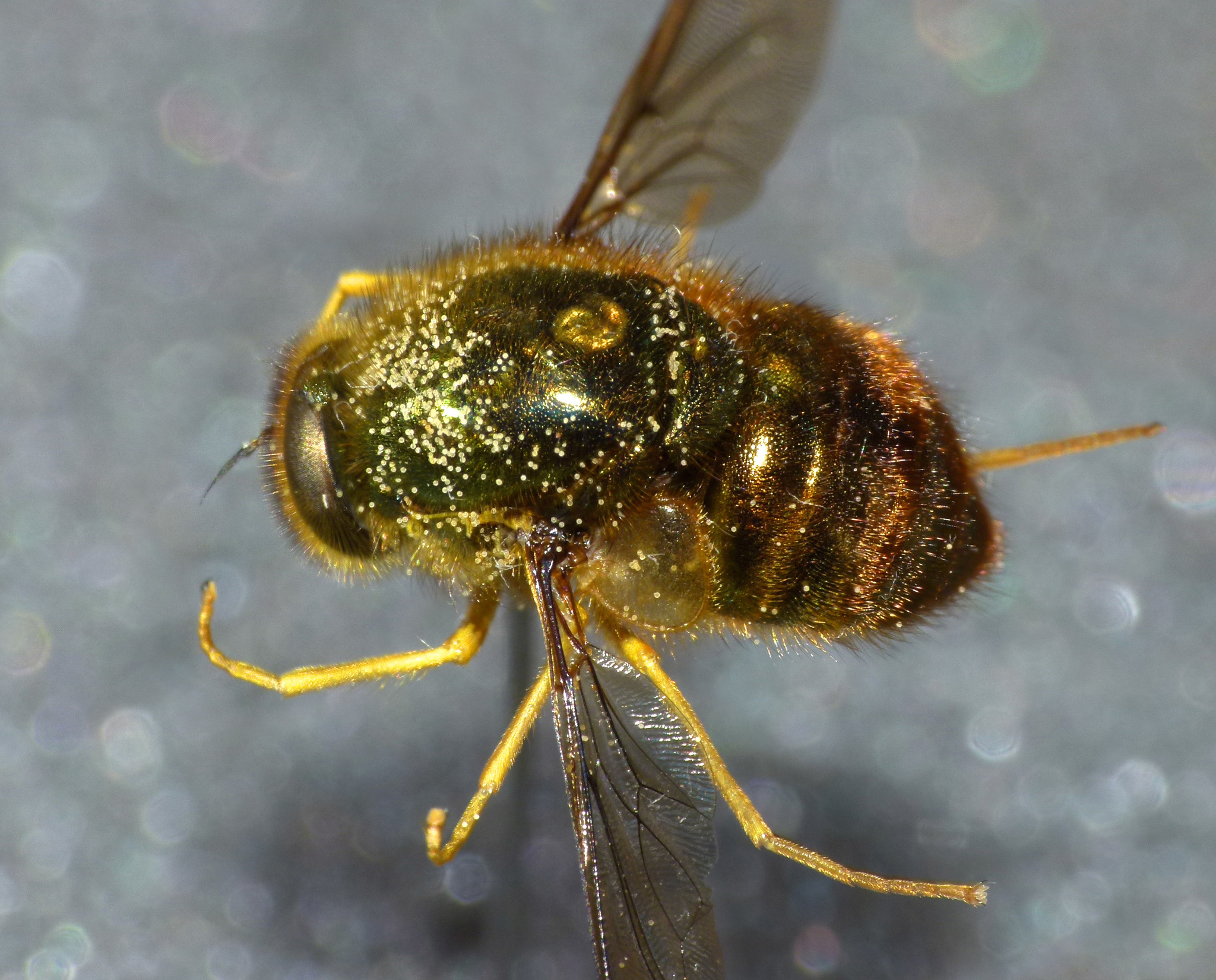

Conservation status
- Naturally Uncommon (NZ TCS)

Scientific classification
- Kingdom: Animalia
- Phylum: Arthropoda
- Clade: Pancrustacea
- Class: Insecta
- Order: Diptera
- Family: Acroceridae
- Subfamily: Panopinae
- Genus: Apsona; Westwood, 1876
- Species: A. muscaria

Binomial name
- Apsona muscaria Westwood, 1876

= Apsona =

Genus of flies

Apsona is a genus of small-headed flies. It contains only one species, Apsona muscaria, which is endemic to New Zealand. It is very similar to the North American species Eulonchus smaragdinus.

A second species, Apsona caerulea, was described from Brazil by Enrico Brunetti in 1926, but its true placement is not clear. In a 1957 PhD thesis by Evert I. Schlinger, Apsona caerulea was transferred to the genus Lasia. Because the dissertation is considered to be unpublished according to the International Code of Zoological Nomenclature, this nomenclatural act is not valid.
