= Mesophysa =

Scientific classification
- Domain: Eukaryota
- Kingdom: Animalia
- Phylum: Arthropoda
- Class: Insecta
- Order: Diptera
- Family: Acroceridae
- Subfamily: Panopinae
- Genus: Mesophysa; Macquart, 1838

Type species
- Mesophysa scapularis (= Panops flavipes Latreille, 1811) Macquart, 1838

Genus of flies

Mesophysa is a genus of small-headed flies endemic to eastern Australia. It has been treated as a synonym of Panops by some authors, and a separate genus by others. Males and females measure 8–10 mm and 9–11 mm, respectively.

== Species ==
- Mesophysa flavipes (Latreille, 1811)
- Mesophysa ilzei Neboiss, 1971
- Mesophysa tenaria Neboiss, 1971
- Mesophysa ultima Neboiss, 1971
