= Acrocera melanderi =

Scientific classification
- Kingdom: Animalia
- Phylum: Arthropoda
- Class: Insecta
- Order: Diptera
- Family: Acroceridae
- Subfamily: Acrocerinae
- Genus: Acrocera
- Species: A. melanderi

Binomial name
- Acrocera melanderi Cole, 1919

Synonyms
- Acrocera steyskali Sabrosky, 1944

Species of fly

Acrocera melanderi is a species of small-headed flies in the family Acroceridae.
