= Acrocera unguiculata =

Scientific classification
- Kingdom: Animalia
- Phylum: Arthropoda
- Clade: Pancrustacea
- Class: Insecta
- Order: Diptera
- Family: Acroceridae
- Subfamily: Acrocerinae
- Genus: Acrocera
- Species: A. unguiculata

Binomial name
- Acrocera unguiculata Westwood, 1848

Species of fly

Acrocera unguiculata is a species of small-headed flies in the family Acroceridae.

== Distribution ==
United States.
