= Apelleia =

Scientific classification
- Kingdom: Animalia
- Phylum: Arthropoda
- Clade: Pancrustacea
- Class: Insecta
- Order: Diptera
- Family: Acroceridae
- Subfamily: Panopinae
- Genus: Apelleia; Bellardi, 1862

Type species
- Apelleia vittata Bellardi, 1862

Synonyms
- Appeleia Aldrich, 1905

Genus of flies

Apelleia is a genus of small-headed flies (insects in the family Acroceridae). It differs from Ocnaea by its glabrous eyes.

== Species ==
- Apelleia grossa (Osten Sacken, 1887) – Costa Rica
- Apelleia vittata Bellardi, 1862 – Mexico
