= Schizocosa rovneri =

Scientific classification
- Kingdom: Animalia
- Phylum: Arthropoda
- Subphylum: Chelicerata
- Class: Arachnida
- Order: Araneae
- Infraorder: Araneomorphae
- Family: Lycosidae
- Genus: Schizocosa
- Species: S. rovneri

Binomial name
- Schizocosa rovneri Uetz & Dondale, 1979

Species of spider

Schizocosa rovneri is a species of wolf spider found in the United States. Its habitat is primarily leaf litter along floodplains.

== Courtship ==
During courtship, males will bounce and audibly stridulate. Females are more likely to cannibalize males at high temperatures.

== Ecology ==
This species is a host for multiple species of Ogcodes parasitoid larvae, including Ogcodes borealis and Ogcodes pallidipennis.
