= Eulonchus tristis =

Scientific classification
- Domain: Eukaryota
- Kingdom: Animalia
- Phylum: Arthropoda
- Class: Insecta
- Order: Diptera
- Family: Acroceridae
- Subfamily: Panopinae
- Genus: Eulonchus
- Species: E. tristis

Binomial name
- Eulonchus tristis Loew, 1872

Species of fly

Eulonchus tristis is a species of small-headed flies in the family Acroceridae.

A study in 2008 found that individuals of the species visiting flowers of Brodiaea elegans and Iris douglasiana in California carried large pollen loads, with no differences in amount or diversity with respect to sex. The species may be an important pollinator, particularly of Brodiaea elegans and Iris bracteata.
