= Acrocera bimaculata =

Scientific classification
- Kingdom: Animalia
- Phylum: Arthropoda
- Class: Insecta
- Order: Diptera
- Family: Acroceridae
- Subfamily: Acrocerinae
- Genus: Acrocera
- Species: A. bimaculata

Binomial name
- Acrocera bimaculata Loew, 1866

Species of fly

Acrocera bimaculata is a species of small-headed flies in the family Acroceridae.

== Distribution ==
Canada, United States.
