= Eulonchus marginatus =

Scientific classification
- Kingdom: Animalia
- Phylum: Arthropoda
- Class: Insecta
- Order: Diptera
- Family: Acroceridae
- Subfamily: Panopinae
- Genus: Eulonchus
- Species: E. marginatus

Binomial name
- Eulonchus marginatus Osten Sacken, 1877

Species of fly

Eulonchus marginatus is a species of small-headed flies in the family Acroceridae. It has a Nearctic distribution and visits flowers from over ten different families.
