= Eulonchus halli =

Scientific classification
- Domain: Eukaryota
- Kingdom: Animalia
- Phylum: Arthropoda
- Class: Insecta
- Order: Diptera
- Family: Acroceridae
- Subfamily: Panopinae
- Genus: Eulonchus
- Species: E. halli

Binomial name
- Eulonchus halli Schlinger, 1960

Species of fly

Eulonchus halli is a species of small-headed flies in the family Acroceridae. It was named after one of its original collectors, Jack C. Hall, who was also a colleague of the species's author, Evert I. Schlinger, at the University of California.
