= Arrhynchus =

Scientific classification
- Kingdom: Animalia
- Phylum: Arthropoda
- Clade: Pancrustacea
- Class: Insecta
- Order: Diptera
- Family: Acroceridae
- Subfamily: Panopinae
- Genus: Arrhynchus; Philippi, 1871

Type species
- Arrhynchus vittatus Philippi, 1871

Genus of flies

Arrhynchus is a genus of small-headed flies in the family Acroceridae. It was formerly considered a synonym of Ocnaea, but was reinstated as a valid genus by Schlinger in 1968. It is endemic to Chile.

== Species ==
- Arrhynchus maculatus Schlinger, 1968
- Arrhynchus meridionalis (Sabrosky, 1946)
- Arrhynchus penai Schlinger, 1968
- Arrhynchus stuardoi (Sabrosky, 1946)
- Arrhynchus vittatus Philippi, 1871
