= Acrocera subfasciata =

Scientific classification
- Kingdom: Animalia
- Phylum: Arthropoda
- Class: Insecta
- Order: Diptera
- Family: Acroceridae
- Subfamily: Acrocerinae
- Genus: Acrocera
- Species: A. subfasciata

Binomial name
- Acrocera subfasciata Westwood, 1848

Synonyms
- Acrocera liturata Williston, 1886

Species of fly

Acrocera subfasciata is a species of small-headed flies in the family Acroceridae.

== Distribution ==
United States.
