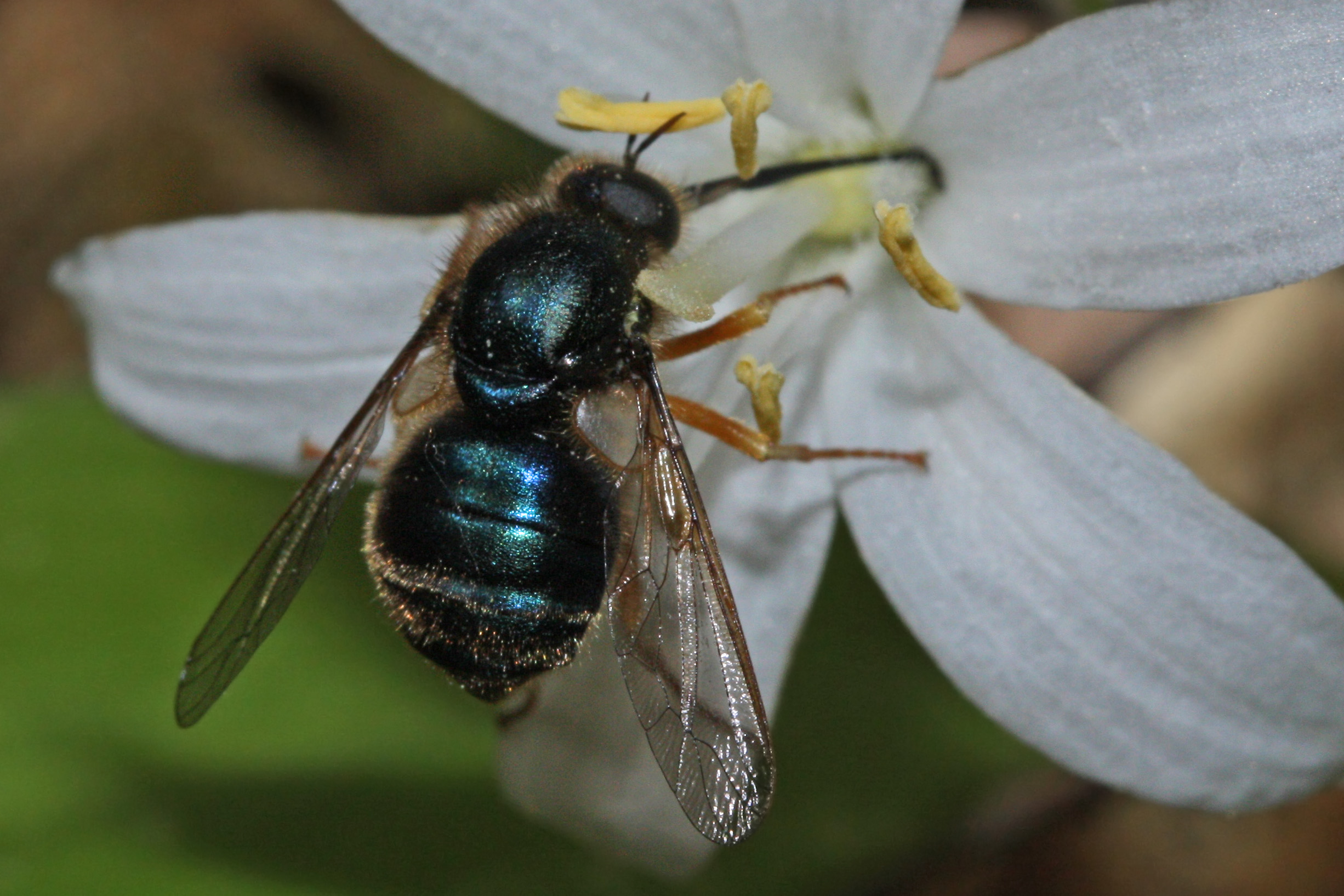

Scientific classification
- Domain: Eukaryota
- Kingdom: Animalia
- Phylum: Arthropoda
- Class: Insecta
- Order: Diptera
- Family: Acroceridae
- Subfamily: Panopinae
- Genus: Eulonchus
- Species: E. sapphirinus

Binomial name
- Eulonchus sapphirinus Osten Sacken, 1877

= Eulonchus sapphirinus =

Species of fly

Eulonchus sapphirinus is a species of small-headed flies in the family Acroceridae.

A study in 2008 found that the species is a potentially important pollinator in certain habitats. Individuals of the species were found to form the majority of insect visitors to Geranium robertianum flowers. Males and females were found to differ in their flower-visiting behaviour, which appears to relate to mating behaviour.

== Gallery ==
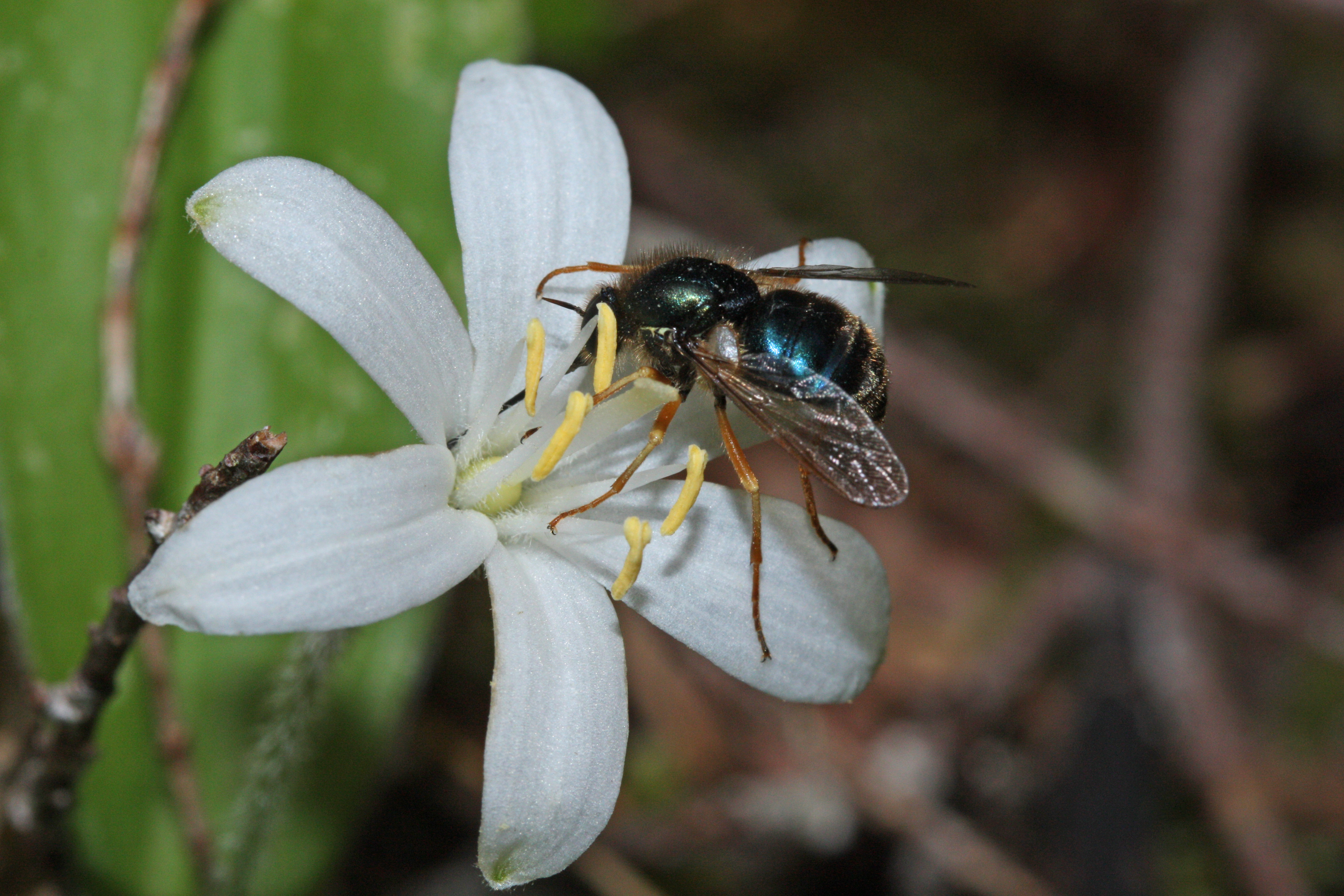
