= Acrocera obsoleta =

Scientific classification
- Kingdom: Animalia
- Phylum: Arthropoda
- Class: Insecta
- Order: Diptera
- Family: Acroceridae
- Subfamily: Acrocerinae
- Genus: Acrocera
- Species: A. obsoleta

Binomial name
- Acrocera obsoleta Van der Wulp, 1867

Species of fly

Acrocera obsoleta is a species of small-headed flies in the family Acroceridae.

== Distribution ==
Canada, United States.
