= Pterodontia misella =

Scientific classification
- Kingdom: Animalia
- Phylum: Arthropoda
- Class: Insecta
- Order: Diptera
- Family: Acroceridae
- Genus: Pterodontia
- Species: P. misella

Binomial name
- Pterodontia misella Osten Sacken, 1877

Synonyms
- Nothra americana Bigot, 1889

Species of fly

Pterodontia misella is a species of small-headed flies (insects in the family Acroceridae). It is very close in appearance to Pterodontia flavipes, and was considered a synonym of it by Curtis Williams Sabrosky in 1948. However, this synonymy has not been adopted by later authors, and P. misella is still recognised as a distinct species.
