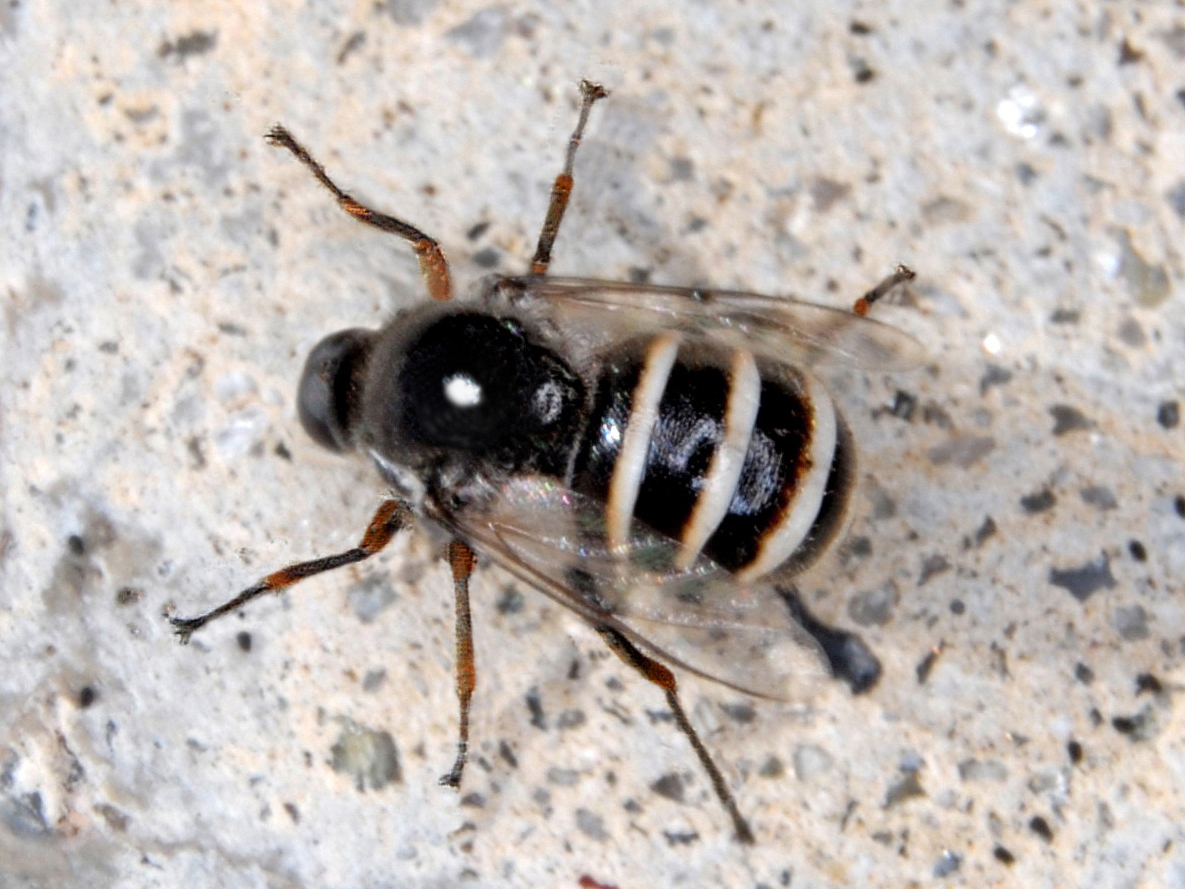
- Ogcodes zonatus

Scientific classification
- Kingdom: Animalia
- Phylum: Arthropoda
- Class: Insecta
- Order: Diptera
- Family: Acroceridae
- Subfamily: Ogcodinae
- Genus: Ogcodes; Latreille, 1796

Type species
- Musca gibbosa Linnaeus, 1758

Synonyms
- Henops Illiger, 1798; Oncodes Meigen, 1822 (unjustified emendation); Thersites Philippi, 1871 (nec Pfeiffer, 1855); Thersitomyia Hunter, 1901

= Ogcodes =

Genus of flies

Ogcodes is a cosmopolitan genus of small-headed flies in the family Acroceridae. About 90 species have been described for the genus. It is the most common and speciose genus in its family. These flies are endoparasitoids of ground-dwelling entelegyne spiders.

== Characteristics ==
Flies in this genus can be distinguished from other genera in the family Acroceridae by the following combination of characteristics:

- Antennae positioned on the ventral surface of the head, slightly above the mouth
- Tibiae lacking apical spurs
- Eyes always holoptic
- Short, rod-like antennal flagellum
- Mouthparts hidden by a membrane
- Reduced wing venation

Adult Ogcodes are small to medium in size, with rounded heads and abdomens. They are often brown or black in color, with a pale horizontal band at the posterior edge of each abdominal tergite.

== Life History ==
Soon after mating, females lay their eggs around dead twigs. These eggs are brown or black in color, and usually under 0.35 millimeters in length. Larvae are endoparasitoids in spiders. Upon emerging, planidial larvae wait to come in contact with a host spider. If a host is not found, the larvae can move to nearby sites by springing into the air or moving similarly to an inchworm. If a host is found, the larva will typically enter it through the abdomen, or occasionally through the intersegmental membranes of the legs. Upon attaching to the inside of the host, the larva will molt twice at a rate that depends on the developmental pace of the host. The site of attachment is in an air pocket between the lamellae of the spider's book lungs. The third-instar larva will consume most of the host spider’s internal contents, then emerge by making a hole along the host’s epigastric furrow. Evidence that acrocerid flies deliberately influence host behavior is limited, but flies in this genus have been observed emerging shortly after their hosts create webbing and clinging to the new webbing using adhesives on their bodies. One to three days after emerging, the larva pupates. Adults can be encountered around dead twigs, or in grassy, wet areas. They have not been observed feeding, though it is possible that the oral membrane in place of functioning mouthparts may be used to collect moisture from the air. Adults are thought to live for three to four weeks at maximum in nature.

== Hosts ==
Larval Ogcodes have been documented developing in spiders from the following taxonomic families:

- Araneidae
- Theridiidae
- Lycosidae
- Agelenidae
- Psechridae
- Amaurobiidae
- Oxyopidae
- Anyphaenidae
- Clubionidae
- Gnaphosidae
- Philodromidae
- Thomisidae
- Salticidae

Like many acrocerids, planidial Ogcodes tend to target hosts that wander or build webs on the ground. Several species within the genus can develop in spiders from three or more different taxonomic families, namely O. adaptus, O. dispar, O. eugonatus, and O. pallidipennis.

== Distribution ==
Ogcodes as a whole is cosmopolitan in distribution. Species richness in Ogcodes is highest in Australia and the Nearctic and Palearctic regions. Species in this genus have not been collected from deserts and certain islands, such as Madagascar and Iceland. The majority of species are found in only one geographic region, with the exceptions of O. pallidipennis, O. dispar, and O. guttatus. Alongside Pterodontia, Ogcodes is one of the two acrocerid genera present in every zoogeographic region.

== Taxonomy ==
Ogcodes is the only extant genus within the subfamily Ogcodinae. Based on its morphology, the genus was previously placed within Acrocerinae. While many species in Acrocerinae target haplogyne spiders, not a single species in Ogcodes does. Despite sharing morphological characteristics with the acrocerid genus Pterodontia, such as having antennae located on the ventral surface of the head and reduced mouthparts, molecular data indicates that these two genera are not particularly closely related.

== Subgenera and species ==
The genus is split into three subgenera: Ogcodes, Protogcodes and Neogcodes. Ogcodes is cosmopolitan in distribution, Protogcodes is endemic to Australia, and Neogcodes is restricted to the Nearctic.

Subgenus Ogcodes Latreille, 1796

- Ogcodes acroventris Nartshuk, 1982
- Ogcodes adaptatus Schlinger, 1960
- Ogcodes alluaudi Becker, 1914
- Ogcodes angustimarginatus Brunetti, 1920
- Ogcodes asiaticus Nartshuk, 1975
- Ogcodes argentinensis Schlinger, 1960
- Ogcodes argigaster Schlinger, 1960
- Ogcodes armstrongi Paramonov, 1957
- Ogcodes ater White, 1915
- Ogcodes basalis (Walker, 1852)
- Ogcodes bigoti Nartshuk, 1982
- Ogcodes boharti Schlinger, 1960
- Ogcodes borneoensis Schlinger, 1971
- Ogcodes borealis Cole, 1919
- Ogcodes brasilensis Schlinger, 1960
- Ogcodes brunneus (Hutton, 1881)
- Ogcodes caffer Loew, 1857
- Ogcodes canadensis Schlinger, 1960
- Ogcodes canberranus Paramonov, 1957
- Ogcodes castaneus Brunetti, 1926
- Ogcodes chilensis Sabrosky, 1945
- Ogcodes cingulatus Erichson, 1840
- Ogcodes clavatus Becker, 1909
- Ogcodes coffeatus Speiser, 1920
- Ogcodes colei Sabrosky, 1948
- Ogcodes colombiensis Schlinger, 1960
- Ogcodes congoensis Brunetti, 1926
- Ogcodes consimilis Brunetti, 1926
- Ogcodes costalis (Walker, 1852)
- Ogcodes crassitibialis Brunetti, 1926
- Ogcodes croucampi Barraclough, 1997
- Ogcodes deserticola Paramonov, 1957
- Ogcodes diligens Osten Sacken, 1877
- Ogcodes dispar (Macquart, 1855)
- Ogcodes distinctus Brunetti, 1926
- Ogcodes doddi Wandolleck, 1906
- Ogcodes dusmeti Arias, 1920
- Ogcodes esakii Ôuchi, 1942
- Ogcodes etruscus Griffini, 1896
- Ogcodes eugonatus Loew, 1872
- †Ogcodes exotica Grimaldi, 1995
- Ogcodes flavescens White, 1915
- Ogcodes floridensis Sabrosky, 1948
- Ogcodes formosus Loew, 1873
- Ogcodes fortnumi Westwood, 1876
- Ogcodes fratellus Brunetti, 1926
- Ogcodes fraternus Brunetti, 1926
- Ogcodes froggatti Schlinger in Schlinger & Jeffries, 1989
- Ogcodes fumatus Erichson, 1846
- Ogcodes fuscus Brunetti, 1912
- Ogcodes gibbosus (Linnaeus, 1758)
- Ogcodes glomerosus Paramonov, 1957
- Ogcodes gressiti Schlinger, 1971
- Ogcodes guttatus Costa, 1854
- Ogcodes hennigi Schlinger, 1960
- Ogcodes hirtus Sack, 1936
- Ogcodes hungaricus (Szilády, 1941)
- Ogcodes ignavus Westwood, 1876
- Ogcodes insignis Brunetti, 1926
- Ogcodes jacobaeus (Philippi, 1871)
- Ogcodes jacutensis Pleske, 1930
- Ogcodes javanus De Meijere, 1924
- Ogcodes kunkunche Barahona-Segovia in Barahona-Segovia et al., 2020
- Ogcodes kuscheli Sabrosky, 1951
- Ogcodes lautereri Chvála, 1980
- Ogcodes leptisoma Schlinger, 1960
- Ogcodes lineatus Brunetti, 1926
- Ogcodes longicolus Schlinger, 1971
- Ogcodes luzonensis Schlinger, 1971
- Ogcodes lucidus Paramonov, 1957
- Ogcodes maai Schlinger, 1971
- Ogcodes marginifasciatus Brunetti, 1926
- Ogcodes melampus Loew, 1872
- Ogcodes merens Nartshuk, 1982
- Ogcodes neavei Brunetti, 1926
- Ogcodes niger Cole, 1919
- Ogcodes nigrinervis White, 1915
- Ogcodes nigripes (Zetterstedt, 1838)
- Ogcodes nigritarsis Shiraki, 1932
- Ogcodes nitens (Hutton, 1901)
- Ogcodes nyasae Brunetti, 1926
- Ogcodes obscuripes Chvála, 1980
- Ogcodes orientalis Schlinger, 1960
- Ogcodes ottuc Nartshuk, 1982
- Ogcodes pallidipennis Loew, 1865
- Ogcodes pallipes Latreille in Olivier, 1812
- Ogcodes pamiricus Nartshuk, 1982
- Ogcodes philippinensis Schlinger, 1960
- Ogcodes porteri Schlinger, 1953
- Ogcodes pusillus Paramonov, 1957
- Ogcodes pygmaeus White, 1915
- Ogcodes reginae Trojan, 1956
- Ogcodes respersus Seguy, 1935
- Ogcodes rufoabdominalis Cole, 1919
- Ogcodes rufomarginatus Brunetti, 1926
- Ogcodes sabroskyi Schlinger, 1960
- Ogcodes schembrii Chvála, 1980
- Ogcodes sexmaculatus Brunetti, 1926
- Ogcodes shewelli Sabrosky, 1948
- Ogcodes shirakii Schlinger, 1960
- Ogcodes similis Schlinger, 1960
- Ogcodes taiwanensis Schlinger, 1971
- Ogcodes tasmannicus Westwood, 1876
- Ogcodes tenuipes Paramonov, 1957
- Ogcodes triangularis Sabrosky, 1945
- Ogcodes trifasciatus De Meijere, 1915
- Ogcodes trilineatus Brunetti, 1926
- Ogcodes variegatus Brunetti, 1926
- Ogcodes varius Latreille in Olivier, 1812
- Ogcodes victoriensis Brunetti, 1926
- Ogcodes vittisternum Sabrosky, 1948
- Ogcodes waterhousei Paramonov, 1957
- Ogcodes wilsoni Paramonov, 1957
- Ogcodes zonatus Erichson, 1840

Subgenus Protogcodes Schlinger, 1960

- Ogcodes hirtifrons Paramonov, 1957
- Ogcodes paramonovi Schlinger, 1960

Subgenus Neogcodes Schlinger, 1960

- Ogcodes albiventris Johnson, 1904

The following species are synonyms:

- Ogcodes darwinii Westwood, 1876: synonym of Ogcodes basalis (Walker, 1852)
- Ogcodes fumatus Froggatt, 1907 (preoccupied by O. fumatus Erichson, 1846): renamed to Ogcodes froggatti Schlinger in Schlinger & Jeffries, 1989
- Ogcodes limbatus Bigot, 1888 (preoccupied by Henops limbatus Meigen, 1822, now Ogcodes pallipes Latreille in Olivier, 1812): renamed to Ogcodes bigoti Nartshuk, 1982
