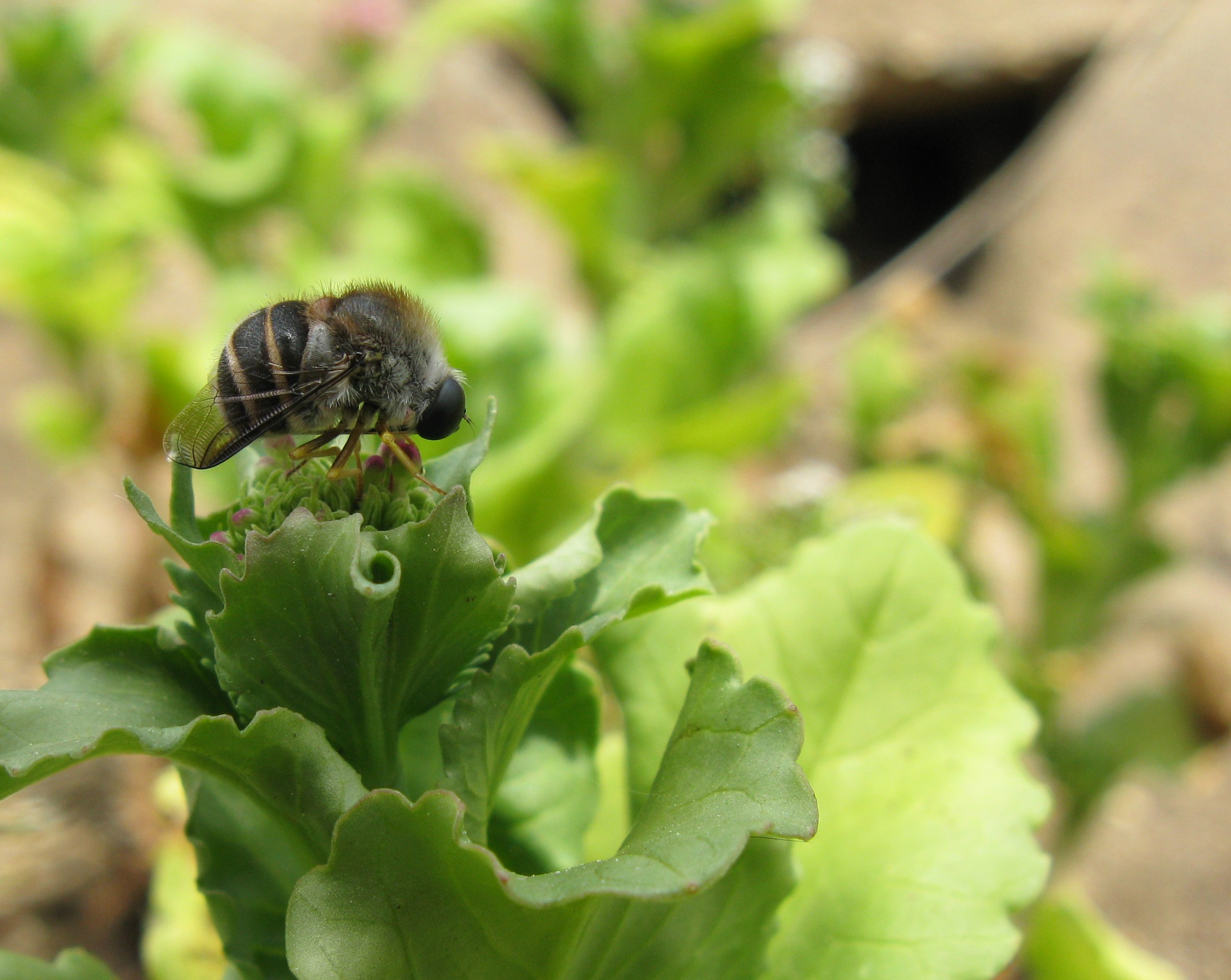
- Psilodera fasciata

Scientific classification
- Kingdom: Animalia
- Phylum: Arthropoda
- Class: Insecta
- Order: Diptera
- Family: Acroceridae
- Subfamily: Panopinae
- Genus: Psilodera; Gray, 1832

= Psilodera =

Genus of small-headed flies

Psilodera is a genus of flies within the family Acroceridae. Members of this genus are found distributed in South Africa.

== Species ==
- Psilodera affinis Westwood, 1848
- Psilodera bipunctata (Wiedemann, 1819)
- Psilodera confusa Schlinger, 1960
- Psilodera fasciata (Wiedemann, 1819)
- Psilodera hessei Schlinger, 1960
- Psilodera natalensis Schlinger, 1960
- Psilodera nhluzane Schlinger, 1960
- Psilodera orbifer (Walker, 1860)
- Psilodera pallidiventris Schlinger, 1960
- Psilodera valida (Wiedemann, 1830)
