= Carvalhoa (fly) =

Scientific classification
- Kingdom: Animalia
- Phylum: Arthropoda
- Clade: Pancrustacea
- Class: Insecta
- Order: Diptera
- Family: Acroceridae
- Subfamily: Acrocerinae
- Genus: Carvalhoa; Koçak & Kemal, 2013

Type species
- Sphaerops appendiculatus Philippi, 1865

Synonyms
- Sphaerops Philippi, 1865 (nec Gray, 1845)

Genus of flies

Carvalhoa is a genus of small-headed flies in the family Acroceridae. The genus is endemic to Chile. It was originally known as Sphaerops, named by Rodolfo Amando Philippi in 1865. This name was found to be preoccupied by the reptile genus Sphaerops Gray, 1845, so it was renamed to Carvalhoa by Ahmet Ömer Koçak and Muhabbet Kemal in 2013. The genus is named after the Brazilian dipterist Claudio José Barros de Carvalho.

Unlike the larvae of other acrocerids, which are endoparasitoids (internal parasitoids) of spiders, the larvae of Carvalhoa appendiculata can develop as ectoparasitoids (external parasitoids) on their host spiders.

== Species ==
- Carvalhoa appendiculata (Philippi, 1865)
- Carvalhoa micella (Schlinger in Schlinger, Gillung & Borkent, 2013)
