= Corononcodes =

Scientific classification
- Kingdom: Animalia
- Phylum: Arthropoda
- Class: Insecta
- Order: Diptera
- Family: Acroceridae
- Subfamily: Panopinae
- Genus: Corononcodes; Speiser, 1920

Type species
- Corononcodes coronatus Speiser, 1920

Genus of flies

Corononcodes is a genus of small-headed flies. It is known from South Africa and the Palearctic realm.

== Species ==
- Corononcodes coronatus Speiser, 1920
- Corononcodes dimorpha Barraclough, 2001
- Corononcodes homalostemma Barraclough, 1984
- Corononcodes manningi Barraclough, 2001
- Corononcodes siculus Bezzi, 1923
- Corononcodes ziegleri Kehlmaier, Gharali & Majnon Jahromi, 2014
