= Ogcodes borealis =

Scientific classification
- Kingdom: Animalia
- Phylum: Arthropoda
- Class: Insecta
- Order: Diptera
- Family: Acroceridae
- Genus: Ogcodes
- Species: O. borealis

Binomial name
- Ogcodes borealis Cole, 1919

Species of fly

Ogcodes borealis is a species of small-headed flies (insects in the family Acroceridae). Hosts include spiders of the genus Pardosa as well as the species Schizocosa rovneri.
