= Ogcodes rufoabdominalis =

Scientific classification
- Kingdom: Animalia
- Phylum: Arthropoda
- Class: Insecta
- Order: Diptera
- Family: Acroceridae
- Genus: Ogcodes
- Species: O. rufoabdominalis

Binomial name
- Ogcodes rufoabdominalis Cole, 1919

Species of fly

Ogcodes rufoabdominalis is a species of small-headed flies in the family Acroceridae.
