= Ogcodes schembrii =

Scientific classification
- Kingdom: Animalia
- Phylum: Arthropoda
- Class: Insecta
- Order: Diptera
- Family: Acroceridae
- Genus: Ogcodes
- Species: O. schembrii

Binomial name
- Ogcodes schembrii Chvála, 1980

Species of small-headed fly

Ogcodes schembrii is a species of fly in the family Acroceridae (small-headed flies). They are diurnal and endemic to Malta.

== Source ==
This article incorporates text from a free content work. Licensed under CC0 (license statement/permission). Text taken from Ogcodes schembrii. Encyclopedia of Life.
