= Glaesoncodes =

Glaesoncodes Temporal range: Eocene

Scientific classification
- Kingdom: Animalia
- Phylum: Arthropoda
- Clade: Pancrustacea
- Class: Insecta
- Order: Diptera
- Family: Acroceridae
- Subfamily: Ogcodinae
- Genus: †Glaesoncodes; Hennig, 1968
- Species: †G. completinervis

Binomial name
- †Glaesoncodes completinervis Hennig, 1968

Extinct genus of insects

Glaesoncodes is an extinct genus of small-headed flies in the family Acroceridae. It is known from Baltic amber from the Eocene, though the locality is unknown (possibly Russia). It contains only one species, Glaesoncodes completinervis.
