= Leucopsina =

Scientific classification
- Domain: Eukaryota
- Kingdom: Animalia
- Phylum: Arthropoda
- Class: Insecta
- Order: Diptera
- Family: Acroceridae
- Subfamily: Panopinae
- Genus: Leucopsina; Westwood, 1876

Type species
- Leucopsina odyneroides Westwood, 1876

Genus of flies

Leucopsina is a genus of small-headed flies endemic to Australia. Flies in the genus are colored black and yellow, mimicking the appearance of a wasp. Males and females measure 9.0 mm and 12.0 mm, respectively.

== Species ==
- Leucopsina burnsi (Paramonov, 1957)
- Leucopsina odyneroides Westwood, 1876
