= Pterodontia westwoodi =

Scientific classification
- Domain: Eukaryota
- Kingdom: Animalia
- Phylum: Arthropoda
- Class: Insecta
- Order: Diptera
- Family: Acroceridae
- Genus: Pterodontia
- Species: P. westwoodi

Binomial name
- Pterodontia westwoodi Sabrosky, 1948

Synonyms
- Pterodontia analis Westwood, 1848 (nec Macquart, 1846)

Species of fly

Pterodontia westwoodi is a species of small-headed flies (insects in the family Acroceridae).
