= Pterodontia notomaculata =

Scientific classification
- Domain: Eukaryota
- Kingdom: Animalia
- Phylum: Arthropoda
- Class: Insecta
- Order: Diptera
- Family: Acroceridae
- Genus: Pterodontia
- Species: P. notomaculata

Binomial name
- Pterodontia notomaculata Sabrosky, 1948

Species of fly

Pterodontia notomaculata is a species of small-headed flies (insects in the family Acroceridae).
