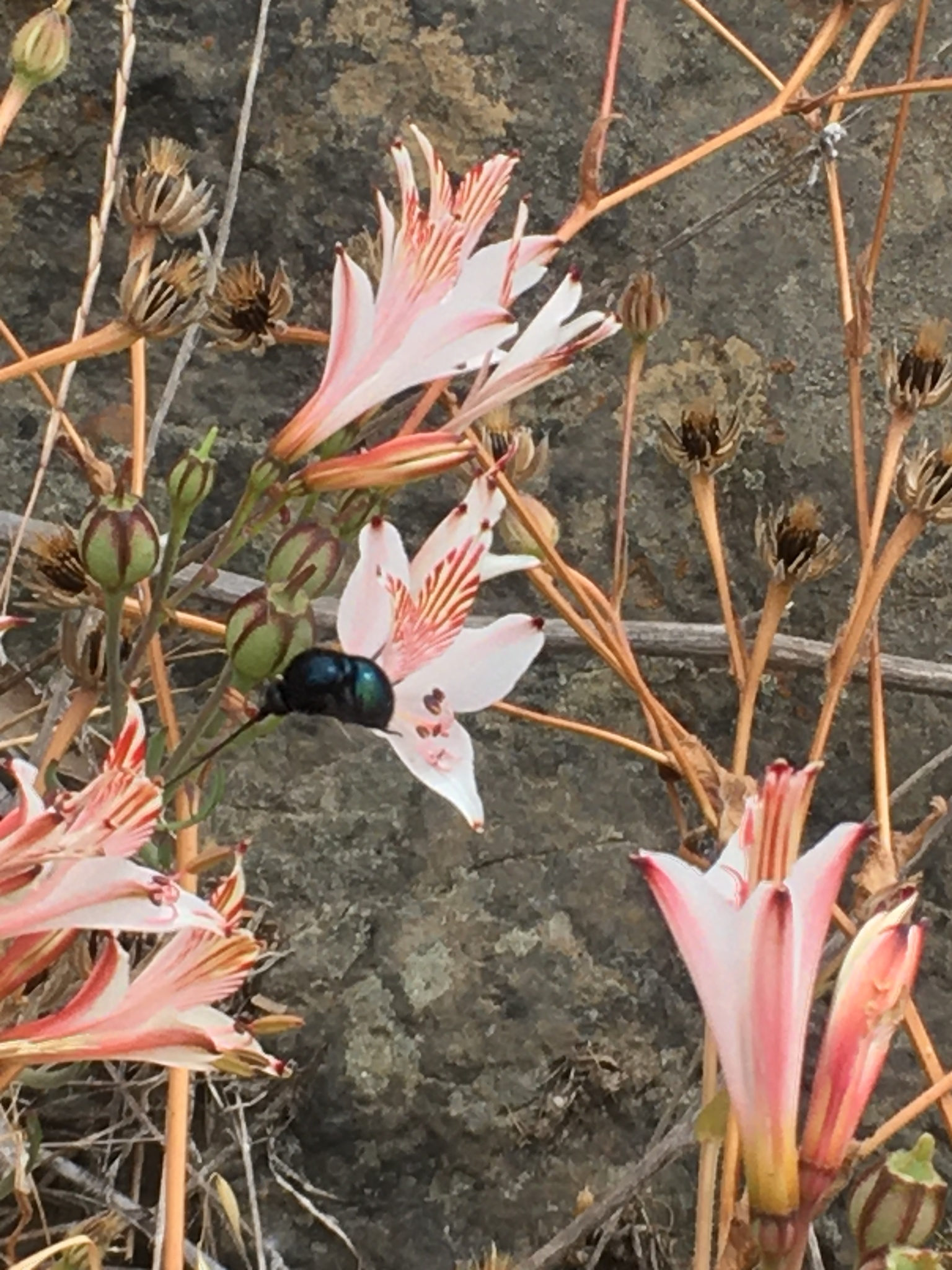

Scientific classification
- Kingdom: Animalia
- Phylum: Arthropoda
- Clade: Pancrustacea
- Class: Insecta
- Order: Diptera
- Family: Acroceridae
- Genus: Lasia
- Species: L. corvina

Binomial name
- Lasia corvina Erichson, 1840

Synonyms
- Panops carbonarius Philippi, 1865; Lasia superba Schiner, 1868

= Lasia corvina =

Species of fly

Lasia corvina is a species of fly from the genus Lasia in the family Acroceridae. The species was originally described by Wilhelm Ferdinand Erichson in 1840. It is known from Chile and Argentina.
