= Lasia purpurata =

Scientific classification
- Kingdom: Animalia
- Phylum: Arthropoda
- Class: Insecta
- Order: Diptera
- Family: Acroceridae
- Genus: Lasia
- Species: L. purpurata

Binomial name
- Lasia purpurata Bequaert, 1933

Species of fly

Lasia purpurata, the purple small-headed fly, is a species of small-headed flies in the family Acroceridae. It was first described by Joseph Charles Bequaert in 1933, from a single specimen collected from Oklahoma. It is now known to occur in Arkansas and Texas as well.
