= Ocnaea boharti =

Scientific classification
- Kingdom: Animalia
- Phylum: Arthropoda
- Class: Insecta
- Order: Diptera
- Family: Acroceridae
- Genus: Ocnaea
- Species: O. boharti

Binomial name
- Ocnaea boharti Schlinger, 1983

Species of fly

Ocnaea boharti is a species of small-headed flies in the family Acroceridae.
