= Ocnaea sequoia =

Scientific classification
- Domain: Eukaryota
- Kingdom: Animalia
- Phylum: Arthropoda
- Class: Insecta
- Order: Diptera
- Family: Acroceridae
- Genus: Ocnaea
- Species: O. sequoia

Binomial name
- Ocnaea sequoia Sabrosky, 1948

Species of fly

Ocnaea sequoia is a species of small-headed flies in the family Acroceridae.
