= Ogcodes eugonatus =

Scientific classification
- Kingdom: Animalia
- Phylum: Arthropoda
- Class: Insecta
- Order: Diptera
- Family: Acroceridae
- Genus: Ogcodes
- Species: O. eugonatus

Binomial name
- Ogcodes eugonatus Loew, 1872

Synonyms
- Ogcodes albicinctus Cole, 1923; Ogcodes marginatus Cole, 1919; Oncodes eugonatus Loew, 1872

Species of fly

Ogcodes eugonatus is a species of small-headed flies (insects in the family Acroceridae). Larvae are parasites with hosts in five spider families: Lycosidae, Oxyopidae, Thomisidae, Salticidae, and Agelenidae.
