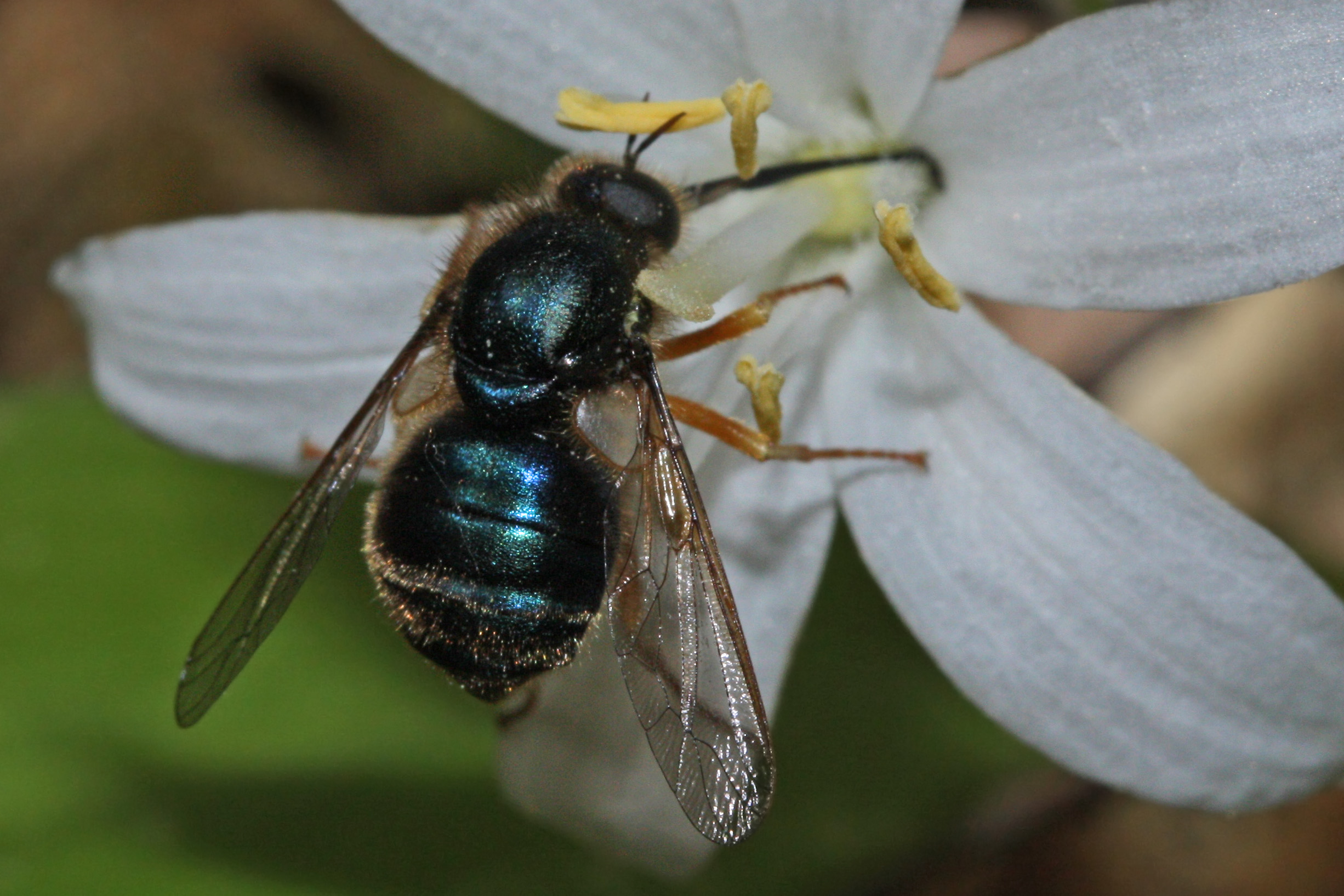
- Eulonchus sapphirinus

Scientific classification
- Kingdom: Animalia
- Phylum: Arthropoda
- Class: Insecta
- Order: Diptera
- Family: Acroceridae
- Subfamily: Panopinae
- Genus: Eulonchus; Gerstaecker, 1856

Type species
- Eulonchus smaragdinus Gerstaecker, 1856

= Eulonchus =

Genus of flies

Eulonchus is a genus of small-headed flies in the family Acroceridae. There are six described species in Eulonchus. The genus is found in North America. Adults have a metallic blue, green or sometimes purple coloration, giving them a jewel-like appearance. A common name for flies in the genus is the North American jewelled spider flies. Adults are also known as "sapphires" or "emeralds".

== Species ==
These six species belong to the genus Eulonchus:

- Eulonchus halli Schlinger, 1960 (Hall's sapphire)
- Eulonchus marginatus Osten-Sacken, 1877 (Sombre Sapphire or Emerald)
- Eulonchus marialiciae Brimley, 1925 (Mary-Alice’s Emerald, Mary Alice's small-headed fly)
- Eulonchus sapphirinus Osten Sacken, 1877 (Northern Sapphire or Emerald)
- Eulonchus smaragdinus Gerstaecker, 1856 (Synonym: E. smaragdinus pilosus Schlinger, 1960^{i c g}) (Southern Emerald or Sapphire)
- Eulonchus tristis Loew, 1872 (Dusky Sapphire)

== Distribution ==
Most species of Eulonchus are distributed west of the Rocky Mountains in the United States, northwards to Canada and southwards to Baja California, Mexico. The exception is Eulonchus marialiciae, which is known only from a small area in the Great Smoky Mountains in North Carolina, though future studies are needed to confirm the species' true range.

== Hosts ==
Flies in the genus attack spiders in the families Euctenizidae and Antrodiaetidae.

== Gallery ==
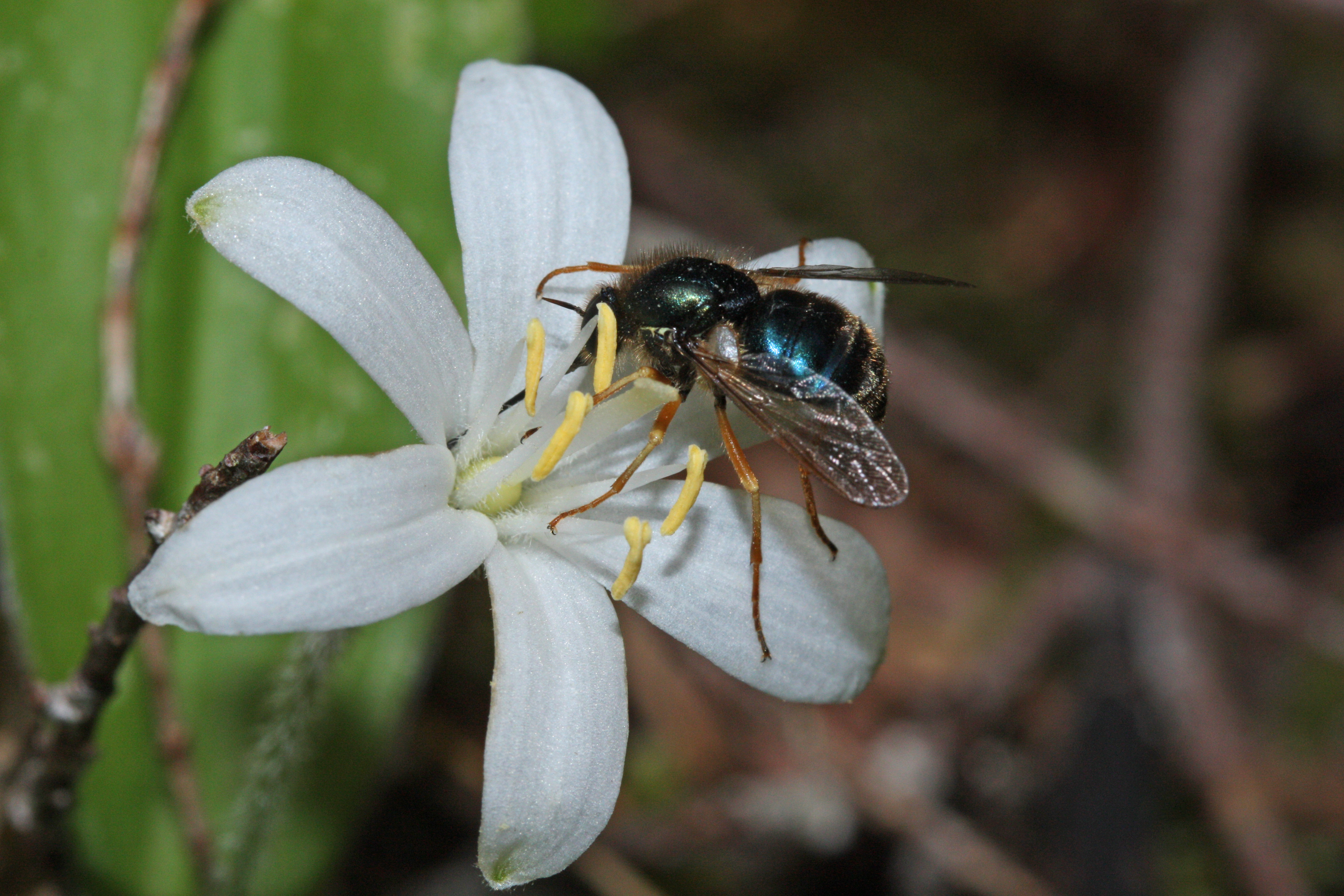
Eulonchus sapphirinus
