= Exetasis =

Scientific classification
- Kingdom: Animalia
- Phylum: Arthropoda
- Clade: Pancrustacea
- Class: Insecta
- Order: Diptera
- Family: Acroceridae
- Subfamily: Panopinae
- Genus: Exetasis; Walker, 1852

Type species
- Exetasis tumens Walker, 1852

Genus of flies

Exetasis is a genus of small-headed flies. It is known from Brazil and Argentina.

== Species ==
- Exetasis brasiliensis Carrera, 1947
- Exetasis calida (Wiedemann, 1830)
- Exetasis caparaoensis Lovati in Lovati & Alves, 2023
- Exetasis eickstedtae Schlinger, 1972
- Exetasis jujuyensis Gillung in Barneche, Gillung & González, 2013
- Exetasis longicornis (Erichson, 1840)
- Exetasis teresensis Cordeiro, 2025
- Exetasis tumens Walker, 1852
