= Pterodontia johnsoni =

Scientific classification
- Domain: Eukaryota
- Kingdom: Animalia
- Phylum: Arthropoda
- Class: Insecta
- Order: Diptera
- Family: Acroceridae
- Genus: Pterodontia
- Species: P. johnsoni

Binomial name
- Pterodontia johnsoni Cole, 1919

Species of fly

Pterodontia johnsoni is a species of small-headed flies (insects in the family Acroceridae).
