= Archipialea =

Scientific classification
- Kingdom: Animalia
- Phylum: Arthropoda
- Clade: Pancrustacea
- Class: Insecta
- Order: Diptera
- Family: Acroceridae
- Subfamily: Panopinae
- Genus: Archipialea; Schlinger, 1973

Type species
- Archipialea chilensis Schlinger, 1973

Genus of flies

Archipialea is a genus of small-headed flies in the family Acroceridae. It is endemic to Chile.

== Species ==
- Archipialea chilensis Schlinger, 1973
- Archipialea irwini Schlinger, 1973
- Archipialea penai Schlinger, 1973
- Archipialea setipennis Schlinger, 1973
