= Ocnaea auripilosa =

Scientific classification
- Kingdom: Animalia
- Phylum: Arthropoda
- Class: Insecta
- Order: Diptera
- Family: Acroceridae
- Genus: Ocnaea
- Species: O. auripilosa

Binomial name
- Ocnaea auripilosa Johnson, 1923

Species of fly

Ocnaea auripilosa is a species of small-headed flies in the family Acroceridae.
