= Camposella =

Scientific classification
- Kingdom: Animalia
- Phylum: Arthropoda
- Clade: Pancrustacea
- Class: Insecta
- Order: Diptera
- Family: Acroceridae
- Subfamily: Panopinae
- Genus: Camposella; Cole, 1919
- Species: C. insignata

Binomial name
- Camposella insignata Cole, 1919

Genus of small-headed flies

Camposella is a genus of small-headed flies in the family Acroceridae. It contains only one species, Camposella insignata, known only from the Ecuadorian Andes. The species can be identified by its conspicuous enlarged antennal flagella, which form paddle-like plates about twice as long as the head, with a width less than half the length.
