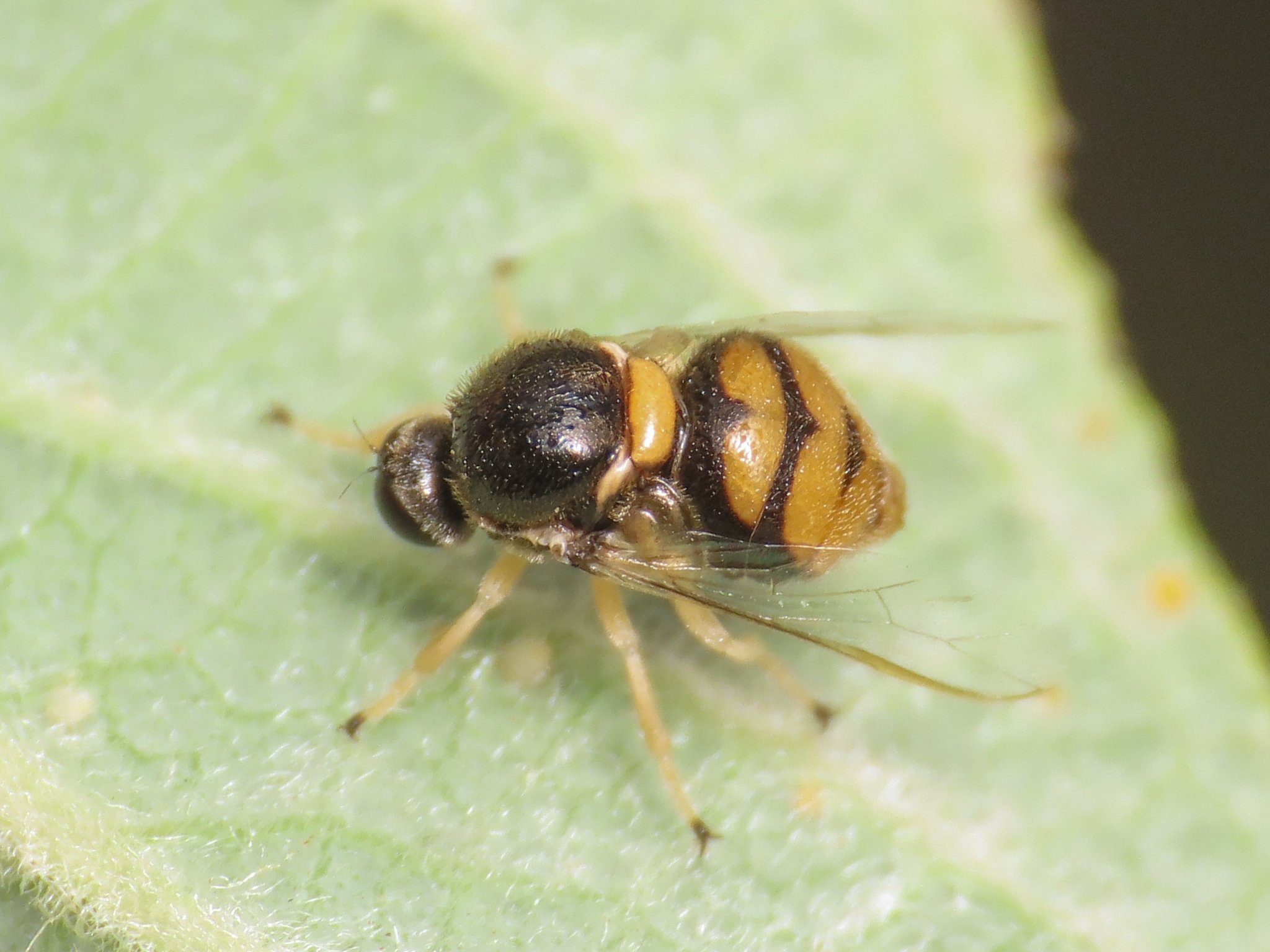
- Acrocera orbiculus, Italy

Scientific classification
- Kingdom: Animalia
- Phylum: Arthropoda
- Clade: Pancrustacea
- Class: Insecta
- Order: Diptera
- Family: Acroceridae
- Subfamily: Acrocerinae
- Genus: Acrocera; Meigen, 1803

Type species
- Syrphus globulus ( = Syrphus orbiculus Fabricius, 1787) Panzer, 1802

Synonyms
- Paracrocera Mik, 1886; Acrodes Froggatt, 1907

= Acrocera =

Genus of flies

Acrocera is a genus of small-headed flies in the family Acroceridae.

== Species ==
Subgenus Acrocera Meigen, 1803

- Acrocera ashleyi Barraclough, 2000
- Acrocera bacchulus (Frey, 1936)
- Acrocera bakeri Coquillett, 1904
- Acrocera bicolor Macquart, 1846
- Acrocera borealis Zetterstedt, 1838
- Acrocera bulla Westwood, 1848
- Acrocera brasiliensis Gil Collado, 1928
- Acrocera convexa Cole, 1919
- Acrocera fasciata Wiedemann, 1830
- Acrocera flaveola Sabrosky, 1944
- Acrocera fumipennis Westwood, 1848
- Acrocera honorati Brèthes, 1925
- Acrocera infurcata Brunetti, 1926
- Acrocera laeta Gerstaecker, 1856
- Acrocera londti Barraclough, 1984
- Acrocera nigrina Westwood, 1848
- Acrocera obsoleta Wulp, 1867
- Acrocera orbiculus (Fabricius, 1787)
- Acrocera paitana (Séguy, 1956)
- Acrocera pallidivena Schlinger, 1960
- Acrocera parva Yang, Liu & Dong, 2016
- Acrocera tenuistylus Yang, Liu & Dong, 2016
- Acrocera turneri Schlinger, 1960
- Acrocera unguiculata Westwood, 1848
- Acrocera vansoni Schlinger, 1960
- Acrocera wulingensis Yang, Liu & Dong, 2016

Subgenus Acrocerina Gil Collado, 1929:

- Acrocera altaica Pleske, 1930
- Acrocera arizonensis Cole, 1919
- Acrocera bimaculata Loew, 1866
- Acrocera braueri Pokorny, 1887
- Acrocera bucharica Nartshuk, 1982
- Acrocera cabrerae Frey, 1936
- Acrocera chiiensis Ôuchi, 1942
- Acrocera khamensis Pleske, 1930
- Acrocera lindneri Sabrosky, 1954
- Acrocera melanderi Cole, 1919
- Acrocera melanogaster Schlinger, 1961
- Acrocera mongolica Pleske, 1930
- Acrocera natalensis Schlinger, 1960
- Acrocera nigrofemorata Meigen, 1804
- Acrocera obnubila Nartshuk, 1979
- Acrocera obscura Gil Collado, 1929
- Acrocera plebeia Brunetti, 1926
- Acrocera prima Meijere, 1914
- Acrocera rhodesiensis Schlinger, 1960
- Acrocera sanguinea Meigen, 1804
- Acrocera sordida Pleske, 1930
- Acrocera stansburyi Johnson, 1923
- Acrocera stelviana Pokorny, 1886
- Acrocera subfasciata Westwood, 1848
- Acrocera tarsalis Nartshuk, 1975
- Acrocera transbaicalica Pleske, 1930
- Acrocera trifasciata Pleske, 1930
- Acrocera trigramma Loew, 1845
- Acrocera trigrammoides Pokorny, 1887

The fossil species Acrocera hirsuta Scudder, 1877 is not considered an acrocerid, instead appearing closer to the Mythicomyiidae.
