= Pialea =

Scientific classification
- Domain: Eukaryota
- Kingdom: Animalia
- Phylum: Arthropoda
- Class: Insecta
- Order: Diptera
- Family: Acroceridae
- Subfamily: Panopinae
- Genus: Pialea; Erichson, 1840

Type species
- Pialea lomata Erichson, 1840

Genus of flies

Pialea is a genus of small-headed flies. It is known from South America.

== Species ==
- Pialea antiqua Schlinger, 1956
- Pialea brunea Schlinger in Schlinger, Gillung & Borkent, 2013
- Pialea capitella Schlinger, 1956
- Pialea corbiculata Schlinger in Schlinger, Gillung & Borkent, 2013
- Pialea ecuadorensis Schlinger, 1956
- Pialea lomata Erichson, 1840
- Pialea lutescens Westwood, 1876
