= Coquena =

Scientific classification
- Kingdom: Animalia
- Phylum: Arthropoda
- Clade: Pancrustacea
- Class: Insecta
- Order: Diptera
- Family: Acroceridae
- Subfamily: Panopinae
- Genus: Coquena; Schlinger in Schlinger, Gillung & Borkent, 2013

Type species
- Coquena stangei Schlinger in Schlinger, Gillung & Borkent, 2013

Genus of flies

Coquena is a genus of small-headed fly found in Argentina and Chile. It was first established by Evert I. Schlinger in 2013.

The genus is named after the Coquena legend of north-western Argentina. The type species, Coquena stangei, is named after Dr. Lionel A. Stange, who collected the type series.

== Species ==
The genus includes two species:

- Coquena coquimbensis González & Ramírez, 2021 – Chile
- Coquena stangei Schlinger in Schlinger, Gillung & Borkent, 2013 – Argentina
