= Ogcodes dispar =

Scientific classification
- Kingdom: Animalia
- Phylum: Arthropoda
- Class: Insecta
- Order: Diptera
- Family: Acroceridae
- Genus: Ogcodes
- Species: O. dispar

Binomial name
- Ogcodes dispar (Macquart, 1855)

Synonyms
- Henops dispar Macquart, 1855; Ogcodes vittatus Johnson, 1923

Species of fly

Ogcodes dispar is a species of small-headed flies (insects in the family Acroceridae).
