= Ogcodes canadensis =

Scientific classification
- Kingdom: Animalia
- Phylum: Arthropoda
- Class: Insecta
- Order: Diptera
- Family: Acroceridae
- Genus: Ogcodes
- Species: O. canadensis

Binomial name
- Ogcodes canadensis Schlinger, 1960

Species of fly

Ogcodes canadensis is a species of small-headed flies (insects in the family Acroceridae).
