= Pterodontia vix =

Scientific classification
- Domain: Eukaryota
- Kingdom: Animalia
- Phylum: Arthropoda
- Class: Insecta
- Order: Diptera
- Family: Acroceridae
- Genus: Pterodontia
- Species: P. vix

Binomial name
- Pterodontia vix Townsend, 1895

Species of fly

Pterodontia vix is a species of small-headed flies (insects in the family Acroceridae).
