= Ogcodes pallidipennis =

Scientific classification
- Kingdom: Animalia
- Phylum: Arthropoda
- Class: Insecta
- Order: Diptera
- Family: Acroceridae
- Genus: Ogcodes
- Species: O. pallidipennis

Binomial name
- Ogcodes pallidipennis Loew, 1866

Synonyms
- Oncodes aedon Townsend, 1895; Oncodes costatus Loew, 1869; Oncodes humeralis Osten Sacken, 1887; Oncodes incultus Osten Sacken, 1877; Oncodes pallidipennis Loew, 1866

Species of fly

Ogcodes pallidipennis is a species of small-headed flies in the family Acroceridae. Larvae are parasites that develop within Pardosa lapidicina.
