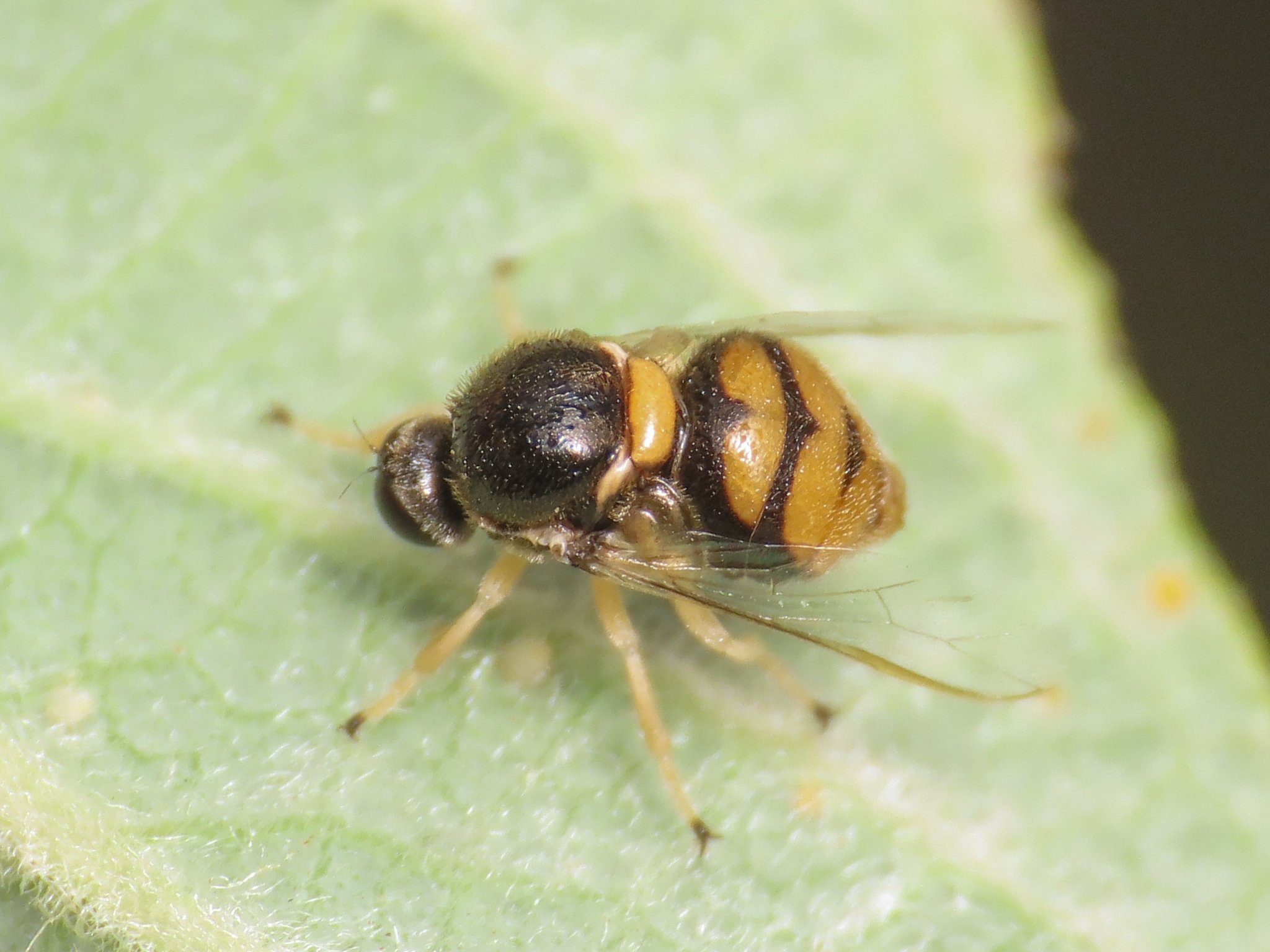
- Acrocera orbiculus, Italy

Scientific classification
- Kingdom: Animalia
- Phylum: Arthropoda
- Clade: Pancrustacea
- Class: Insecta
- Order: Diptera
- Family: Acroceridae
- Genus: Acrocera
- Species: A. orbiculus

Binomial name
- Acrocera orbiculus (Fabricius, 1787)

Synonyms
- Acrocera albipes Meigen, 1804; Acrocera borealis Zetterstedt, 1838; Acrocera hubbardi Cole, 1919; Acrocera hungerfordi Sabrosky, 1944; Acrocera tumida Erichson, 1840; Ogcodes pubescens Latreille, 1805; Paracrocera kaszabi Majer, 1977; Paracrocera manevali Séguy, 1926; Paracrocera minuscula Séguy, 1934; Syrphus globulus Panzer, 1802; Syrphus orbiculus Fabricius, 1787

= Acrocera orbiculus =

Species of fly

Acrocera orbiculus, also known as the top-horned hunchback, is a species of fly belonging to the family Acroceridae. The species has a holarctic distribution, ranging from North America to the Palaearctic.

== Etymology ==
The specific name is the Latin diminutive noun orbiculus, meaning 'a small disk'. As a noun in apposition, the suffix does not alter to reflect the gender of the genus.

== Description ==
"Antennae placed at the extreme top of the head, ending in a long thin arista. Venation very much reduced. Proboscis absent, or very short and stumpy"

== Biology ==
The larvae are endoparasites of spiders in the families Amaurobiidae, Clubionidae and Lycosidae.
