= Archocyrtus =

Archocyrtus Temporal range: Callovian

Scientific classification
- Kingdom: Animalia
- Phylum: Arthropoda
- Class: Insecta
- Order: Diptera
- Family: Acroceridae
- Subfamily: †Archocyrtinae; Ussatchov, 1968
- Genus: †Archocyrtus; Ussatchov, 1968

Type species
- †Archocyrtus gibbosus Ussatchov, 1968

Species
- †A. gibbosus; †A. kovalevi

Synonyms
- Juracyrtus Nartshuk, 1996

Extinct genus of flies

Archocyrtus is an extinct genus of small-headed flies in the family Acroceridae. The genus is known from compression fossils from the Late Jurassic Karabastau Formation of Kazakhstan. The genus is the only member of the subfamily Archocyrtinae.

A study on the holotype specimen of Archocyrtus kovalevi was published by Khramov & Lukashevich (2019). They reported evidence of an extremely long proboscis, almost twice the length of the body of the insect. They suggested that it was probably a pollinator of extinct seed plants belonging to the order Bennettitales.

== Species ==
Two species belong to the genus Archocyrtus:

- †A. gibbosus Ussatchov, 1968
- †A. kovalevi (Nartshuk, 1996)
