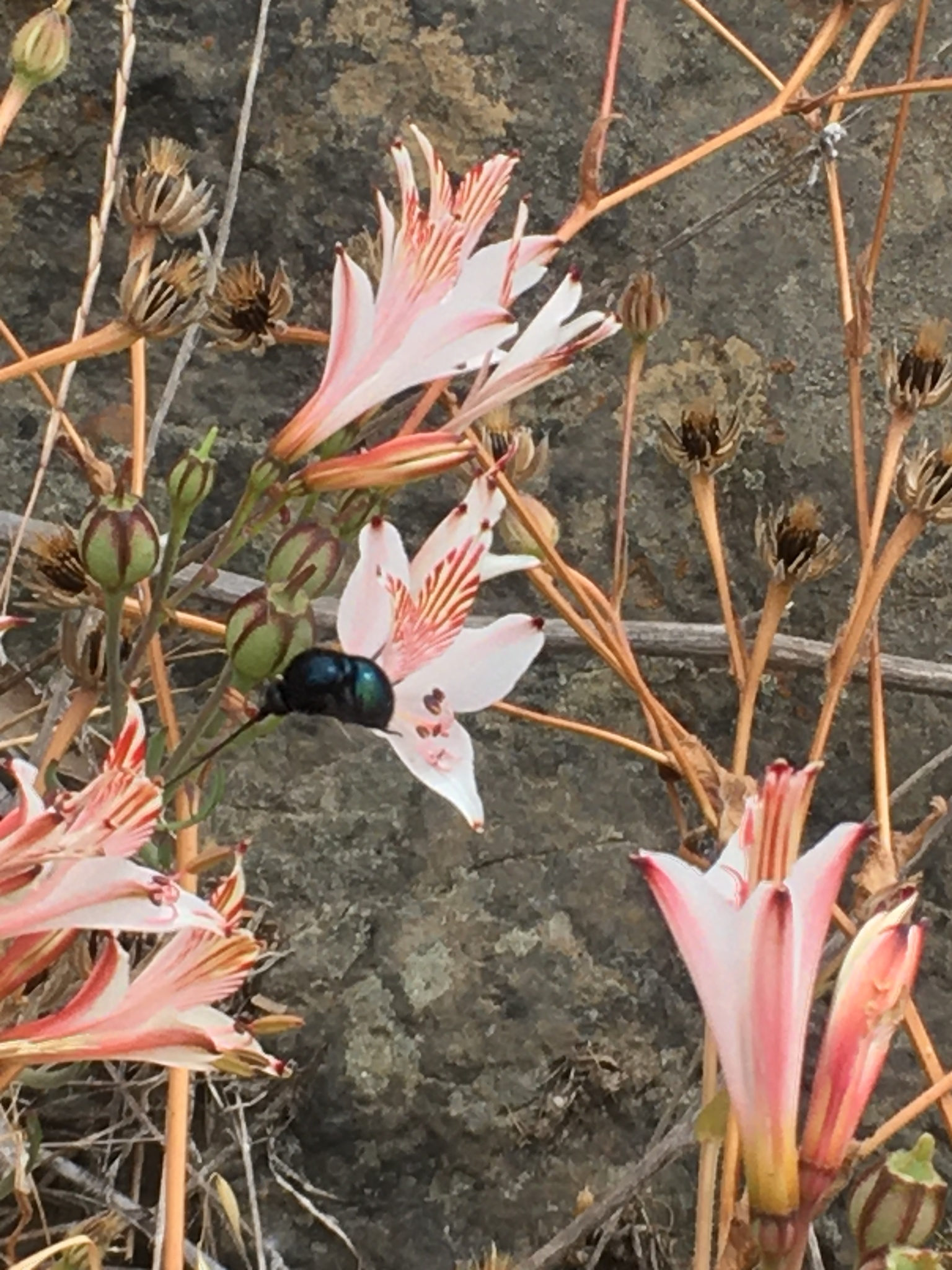
- Lasia corvina

Scientific classification
- Kingdom: Animalia
- Phylum: Arthropoda
- Class: Insecta
- Order: Diptera
- Family: Acroceridae
- Subfamily: Panopinae
- Genus: Lasia; Wiedemann, 1824

Type species
- Lasia splendens Wiedemann, 1824

Synonyms
- Vertexistemma Bigot, 1856

= Lasia (fly) =

Genus of flies

Lasia is a genus of small-headed flies in the family Acroceridae. There are about 19 described species in Lasia, which are distributed in the New World.

== Species ==
These 19 species belong to the genus Lasia:

- Lasia aenea Rondani, 1863 – Chile
- Lasia auricoma Westwood, 1848 – Brazil
- Lasia colei Aldrich, 1927 – Costa Rica
- Lasia corvina Erichson, 1840^{c g} – Chile
- Lasia cuprea Rondani, 1863 – Chile
- Lasia ecuadorensis Bequaert, 1931^{c g} – Ecuador
- Lasia klettii Osten Sacken, 1875^{i} – United States (Arizona)
- Lasia metallica Rondani, 1863^{c g} – Chile
- Lasia nigritarsis (Blanchard, 1852)^{c g} – Chile
- Lasia ocelliger (Wiedemann, 1830)^{c g} – Brazil
- Lasia pulla (Philippi, 1865)^{c g} – Chile
- Lasia purpurata Bequaert, 1933^{i b} (purple small-headed fly) – United States (Arkansas, Oklahoma, Texas)
- Lasia rostrata Aldrich, 1927^{c g} – Costa Rica
- Lasia rufa (Philippi, 1865)^{c g} – Chile
- Lasia rufipes Westwood, 1848^{c g} – Brazil
- Lasia rufovestita (Blanchard, 1852)^{c g} – Chile
- Lasia scribae Osten Sacken, 1887 – Guatemala
- Lasia splendens Wiedemann, 1824^{c g} – Brazil
- Lasia yucatanensis Bequaert, 1931 – Mexico (Yucatán)

Synonyms:

- Lasia aenea (Philippi, 1865)^{c g}: synonym of Lasia aenea Rondani, 1863
- Lasia nigripes (Philippi, 1865)^{c g}: synonym of Lasia cuprea Rondani, 1863

Data sources: i = ITIS, c = Catalogue of Life, g = GBIF, b = Bugguide.net
