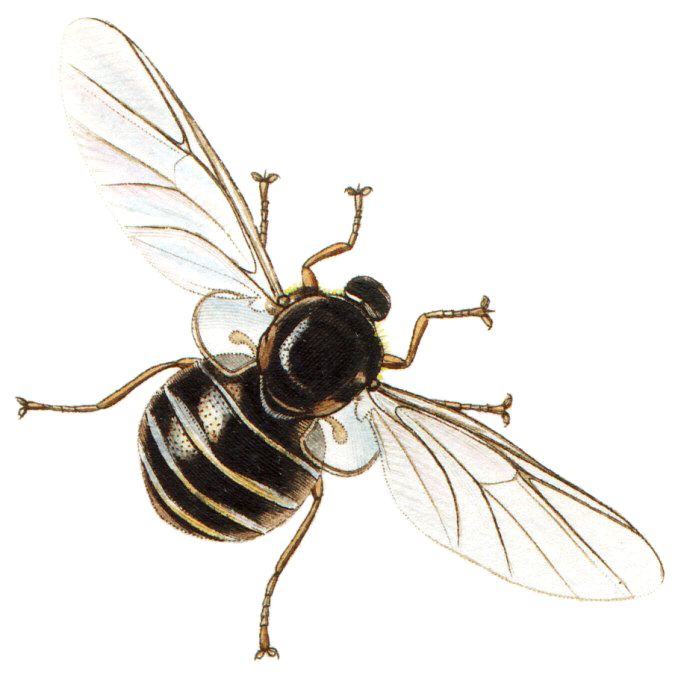
- Ogcodes gibbosus

Scientific classification
- Domain: Eukaryota
- Kingdom: Animalia
- Phylum: Arthropoda
- Class: Insecta
- Order: Diptera
- Family: Acroceridae
- Subfamily: Ogcodinae; Rondani, 1834

Genera
- See text

= Ogcodinae =

Subfamily of flies

Ogcodinae is a subfamily of the Acroceridae (small-headed flies). Their larvae are endoparasites of araneomorph spiders in the subgroup Entelegynae.

== Genera ==
The subfamily includes one extant genus and one extinct:

- †Glaesoncodes Hennig, 1968
- Ogcodes Latreille, 1796
