= Pterodontia flavipes =

Scientific classification
- Domain: Eukaryota
- Kingdom: Animalia
- Phylum: Arthropoda
- Class: Insecta
- Order: Diptera
- Family: Acroceridae
- Genus: Pterodontia
- Species: P. flavipes

Binomial name
- Pterodontia flavipes Gray, 1832

Synonyms
- Pterodontia flavoscutellata Steyskal, 1941

Species of fly

Pterodontia flavipes is a species of small-headed flies (insects in the family Acroceridae). Adult males are 5.5–10.5 mm in size, while adult females are 5–9 mm. The larvae are thought to enter their host spiders at the leg articulations. First instar larvae of the species have also been recorded attacking the mites Podothrombium and Abrolophus.
