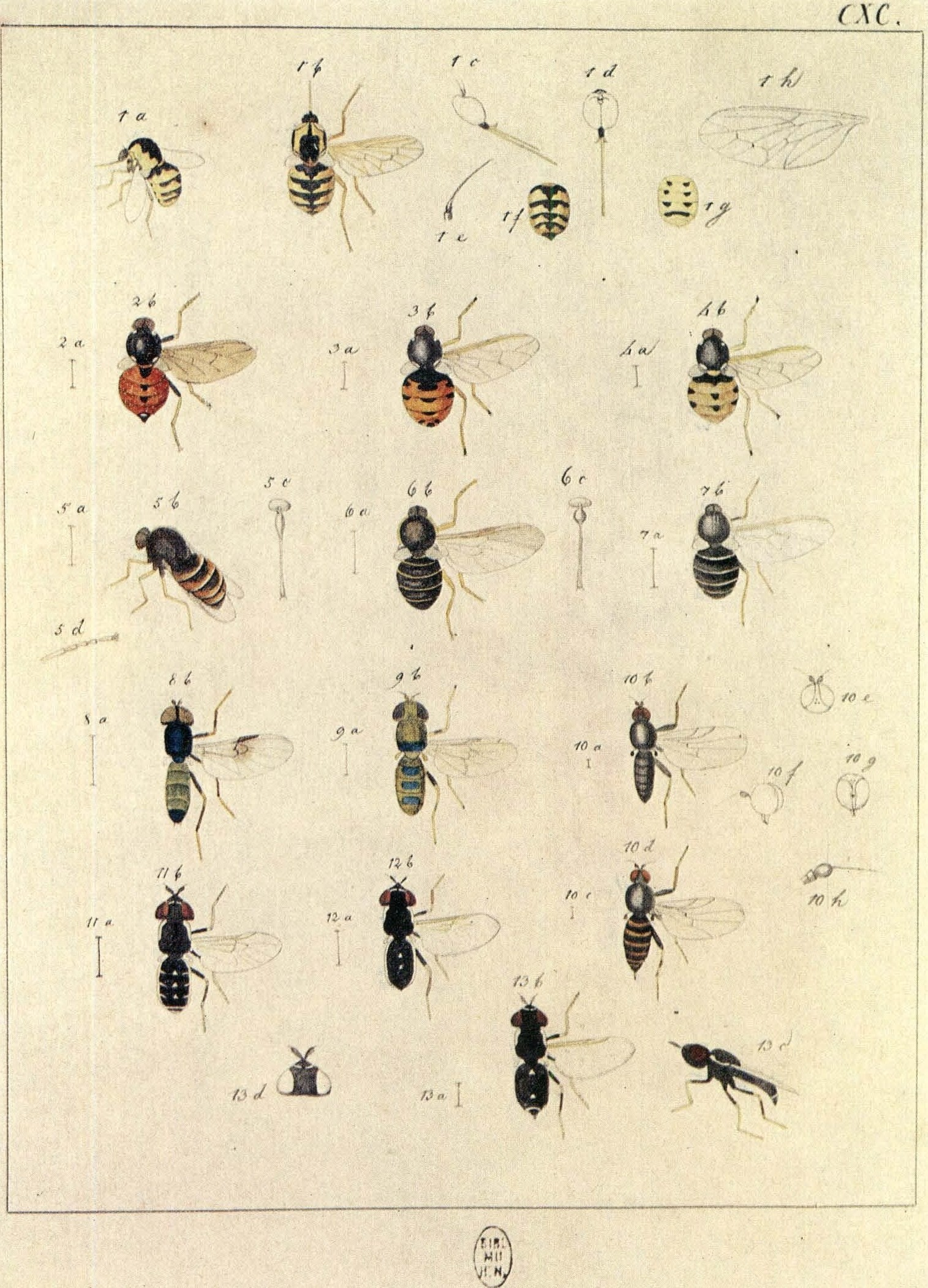
- Ogcodes gibbosus in Meigen 1790 Abbildung der europäischen zweiflügeligen Insekten nach der Natur fig 5

Scientific classification
- Kingdom: Animalia
- Phylum: Arthropoda
- Class: Insecta
- Order: Diptera
- Family: Acroceridae
- Genus: Ogcodes
- Species: O. pallipes

Binomial name
- Ogcodes pallipes Latreille in Olivier, 1812

Synonyms
- Henops limbatus Meigen, 1822; Henops marginatus Meigen, 1822

= Ogcodes pallipes =

Species of fly

Ogcodes pallipes is a Palearctic species of fly in the family Acroceridae.
