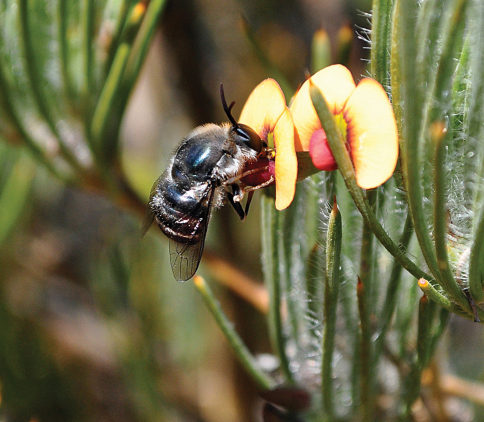
- Panops baudini

Scientific classification
- Domain: Eukaryota
- Kingdom: Animalia
- Phylum: Arthropoda
- Class: Insecta
- Order: Diptera
- Family: Acroceridae
- Subfamily: Panopinae
- Genus: Panops; Lamarck, 1804

Type species
- Panops baudini Lamarck, 1804

Synonyms
- Epicerina Macquart, 1850; Neopanops Schlinger, 1959; Panocalda Neboiss, 1971

= Panops =

Genus of flies

Panops is a genus of small-headed flies. It is endemic to Australia and the Papua region of Indonesia. Males and females measure 8.0–12.5 mm and 9.5–14.5 mm, respectively. Their larvae are thought to be endoparasites of spiders in the infraorder Mygalomorphae, a trait shared by most other members of the subfamily Panopinae.

== Species ==
- Panops aurum Winterton, 2012 – Western Australia
- Panops austrae Neboiss, 1971 – Western Australia
- Panops baudini Lamarck, 1804 – widely distributed in Australia
- Panops boharti (Schlinger, 1959) – Indonesia (Papua)
- Panops conspicuus (Brunetti, 1926) – Western Australia, Victoria
- Panops danielsi Winterton, 2012 – Queensland
- Panops grossi (Neboiss, 1971) – South Australia
- Panops infrequens Glatz, 2023 – South Australia (Kangaroo Island)
- Panops jade Winterton, 2012 – Queensland
- Panops schlingeri Winterton, 2012 – Northern Territory
