= Psilodera fasciata =

Banded humpback fly

Scientific classification
- Kingdom: Animalia
- Phylum: Arthropoda
- Clade: Pancrustacea
- Class: Insecta
- Order: Diptera
- Family: Acroceridae
- Genus: Psilodera
- Species: P. fasciata

Binomial name
- Psilodera fasciata (Wiedemann, 1819)

Synonyms
- Cyrtus fasciatus Wiedemann, 1819; Psilodera contigua Brunetti, 1926

Species of fly

Psilodera fasciata, also known as the banded humpback fly, is a species of small-headed fly found in South Africa. It is the most common species in its genus.

== Taxonomy ==
The species was described by Christian Rudolph Wilhelm Wiedemann in 1819.

== Description ==
Psilodera fasciata is a medium-to-large fly, ranging from 5 to 14 mm (0.20 to 0.55 in). It is either black or brown with yellow, orange, or white markings. It has bare eyes, with its large head placed about halfway from the thorax's dorsum. Its antennae are found in the middle of the insect's head, above the anteclypeus.

== Distribution ==
Psilodera fasciata is mainly found in the South African provinces of Western Cape and Eastern Cape, along with southern Free State.
