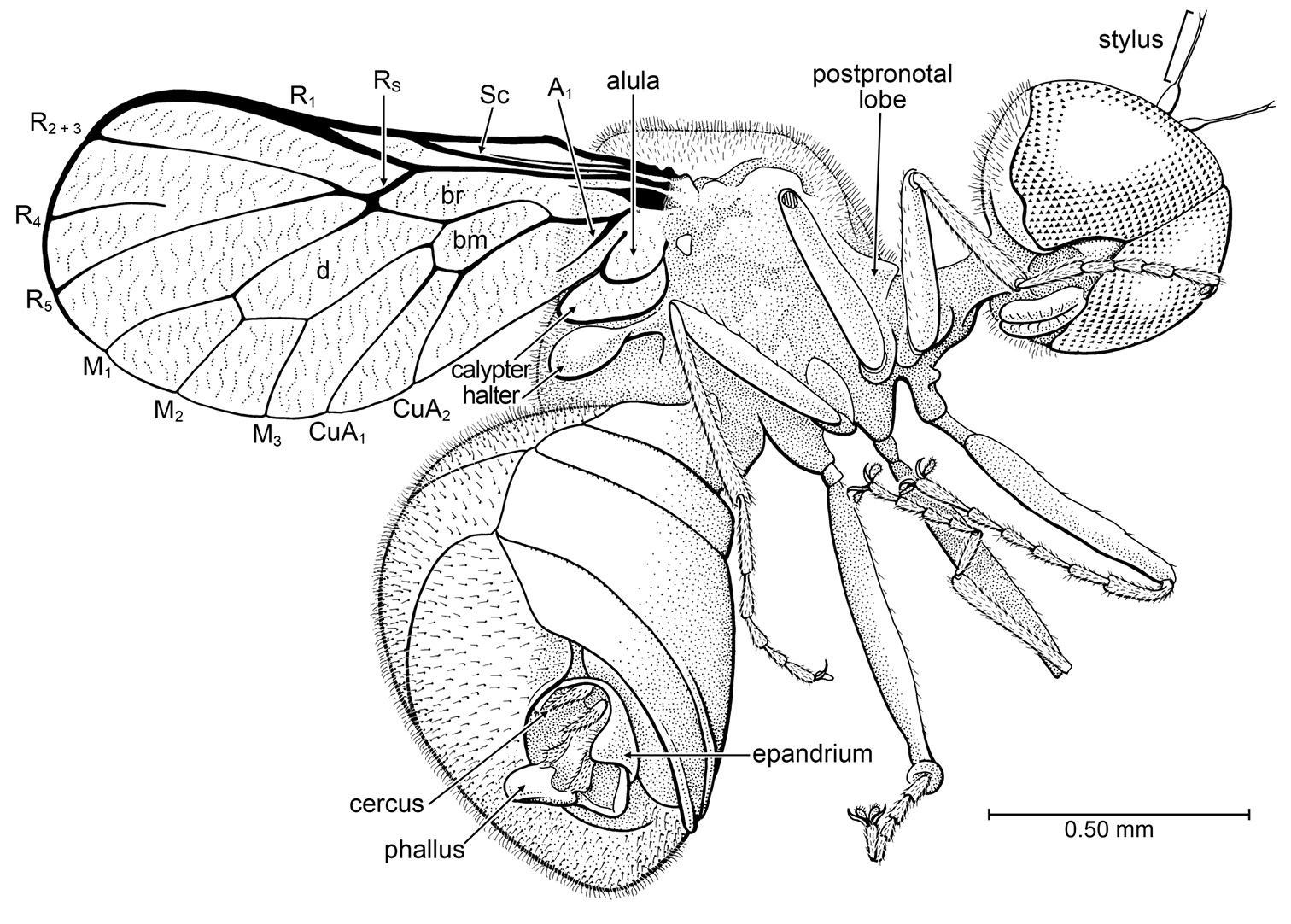

Scientific classification
- Kingdom: Animalia
- Phylum: Arthropoda
- Class: Insecta
- Order: Diptera
- Family: Acroceridae (?)
- Genus: †Burmacyrtus; Grimaldi & Hauser in Grimaldi, Arillo, Cumming & Hauser, 2011
- Species: †B. rusmithi

Binomial name
- †Burmacyrtus rusmithi Grimaldi & Hauser in Grimaldi, Arillo, Cumming & Hauser, 2011

= Burmacyrtus =

Burmacyrtus Temporal range: Cenomanian

Extinct genus of flies

Burmacyrtus is an extinct genus of small-headed flies of uncertain placement. The genus is known from Upper Cretaceous fossils in amber from Myanmar. It contains only one species, Burmacyrtus rusmithi.

The genus was originally placed in the family Acroceridae, though it was later reassessed and considered not to be an acrocerid. Instead, it could possibly be a stem group acrocerid or placed in Heterodactyla (a proposed clade of flies uniting Asiloidea and Eremoneura).

The generic name is a combination of "Burma" (another name for Myanmar) and Cyrtus, an extant genus. The species is named in honor of R.D.A. Ru Smith, who donated the holotype to the AMNH from his personal collection.
