= Ocnaea =

Scientific classification
- Kingdom: Animalia
- Phylum: Arthropoda
- Class: Insecta
- Order: Diptera
- Family: Acroceridae
- Subfamily: Panopinae
- Genus: Ocnaea; Erichson, 1840

Type species
- Ocnaea micans Erichson, 1840

Synonyms
- Eriosoma Macquart, 1838 (nec Leach, 1818); Pialeoidea Westwood, 1876

Genus of flies

Ocnaea is a genus of small-headed flies (insects in the family Acroceridae). There are 20 described species in Ocnaea.

== Species ==
- Ocnaea auripilosa Johnson, 1923
- Ocnaea boharti Schlinger, 1983
- Ocnaea cisnerosi James, 1950
- Ocnaea coerulea Cole, 1919
- Ocnaea falcifer Aldrich, 1928
- Ocnaea flavipes Aldrich, 1926
- Ocnaea gigas Aldrich, 1928
- Ocnaea gloriosa (Sabrosky, 1943)
- Ocnaea helluo Osten Sacken, 1877
- Ocnaea loewi Cole, 1919
- Ocnaea lugubris Gerstaecker, 1856
- Ocnaea magna (Walker, 1849)
- Ocnaea metallica (Osten Sacken, 1887)
- Ocnaea micans Erichson, 1840
- Ocnaea schwarzi Cole, 1919
- Ocnaea sequoia Sabrosky, 1948
- Ocnaea smithi Sabrosky, 1948
- Ocnaea trichocera Osten Sacken, 1887
- Ocnaea trivittata Aldrich, 1932
- Ocnaea xuthogaster Schlinger, 1961
