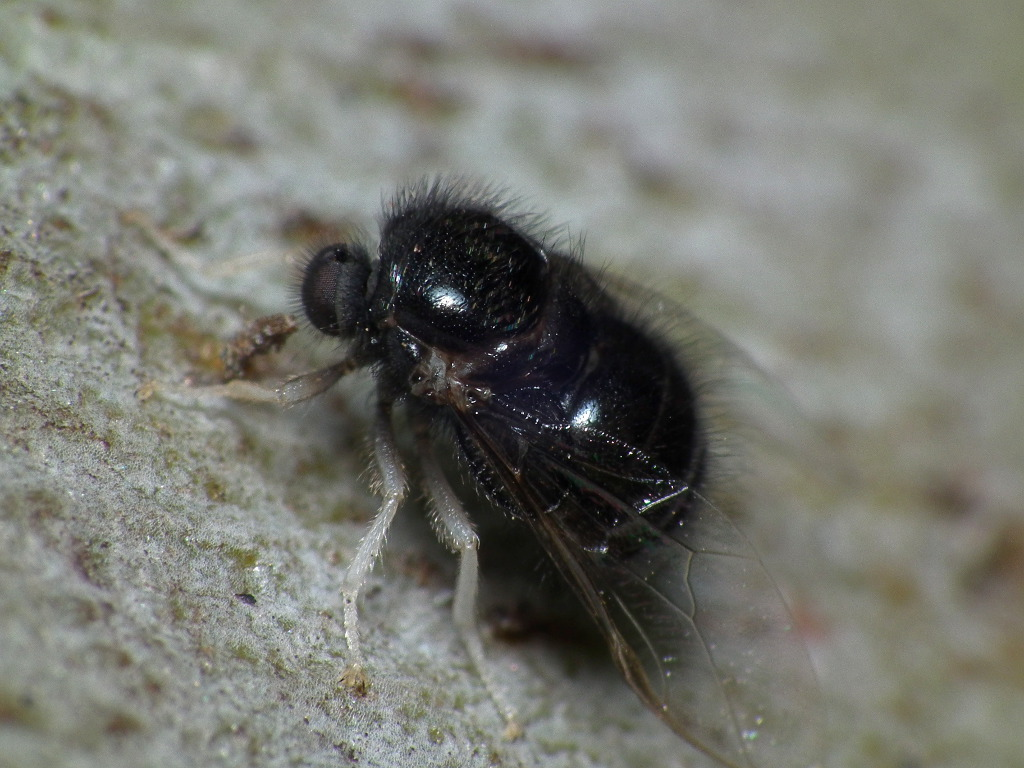

Scientific classification
- Domain: Eukaryota
- Kingdom: Animalia
- Phylum: Arthropoda
- Class: Insecta
- Order: Diptera
- Family: Acroceridae
- Subfamily: Panopinae
- Genus: Pterodontia; Gray in Griffith & Pidgeon, 1832

Type species
- Pterodontia flavipes Gray, 1832

Synonyms
- Nothra Westwood, 1876

= Pterodontia =

Genus of flies

Pterodontia is a genus of small-headed flies (insects in the family Acroceridae). There are at least 20 described species in Pterodontia.

== Description ==
Pterodontia have eyes that are covered in hairs. Their antennae are attached below the middle of the head, and are small, short and inconspicuous. Their mouthparts are small and nearly imperceptible. The tibia have small, atypical spurs. The males have a tooth-like projection on the costal edge of the wing.

== Species ==
These 19 species belong to the genus Pterodontia:

- Pterodontia aerivaga Seguy, 1962^{c g}
- Pterodontia analis Macquart, 1846^{c g}
- Pterodontia andina Brèthes, 1910^{c g}
- Pterodontia davisi Paramonov, 1957^{c g}
- Pterodontia dimidiata Westwood, 1876^{c g}
- Pterodontia ezoensis Ouchi, 1942^{c g}
- Pterodontia flavipes Gray, 1832^{i c g b}
- Pterodontia flavonigra Carrera, 1947^{c g}
- Pterodontia johnsoni Cole, 1919^{i c g b}
- Pterodontia kashmirensis Lichtwardt, 1909^{c g}
- Pterodontia longisquama Sabrosky, 1947^{c g}
- Pterodontia mellii Erichson, 1840^{c g}
- Pterodontia misella Osten Sacken, 1877^{i c g b}
- Pterodontia notomaculata Sabrosky, 1948^{i c g b}
- Pterodontia smithi Johnson, 1898^{c g}
- Pterodontia virmondii Erichson, 1840^{c g}
- Pterodontia vix Townsend, 1895^{i c g b}
- Pterodontia waxelii (Klug, 1807)^{c g}
- Pterodontia westwoodi Sabrosky, 1948^{i c g b}

Pterodontia variegata White, 1914^{c g} is considered to be a synonym of Pterodontia mellii Erichson, 1840.

Data sources: i = ITIS, c = Catalogue of Life, g = GBIF, b = Bugguide.net
