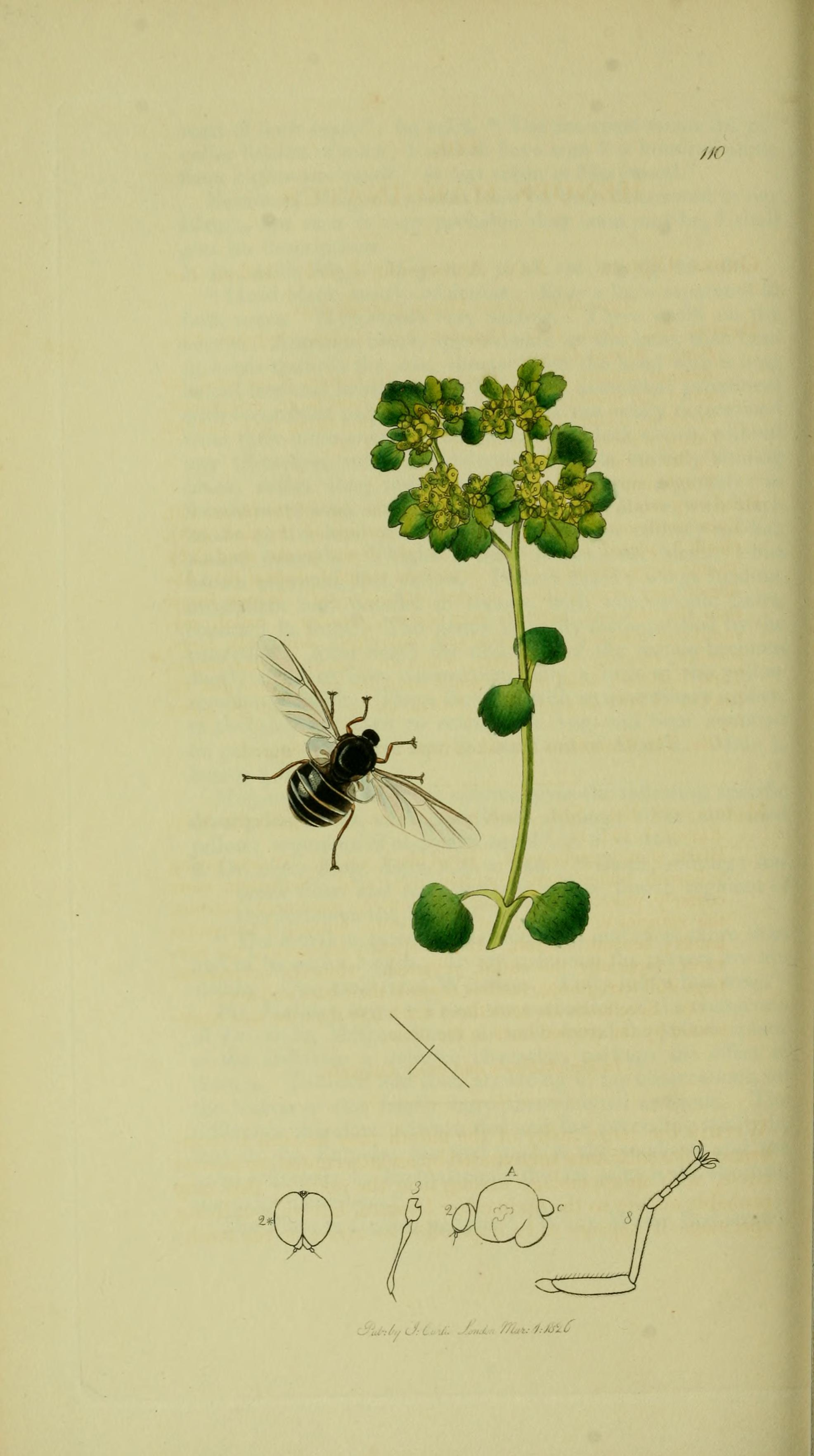
- Ogcodes gibbosus in British Entomology

Scientific classification
- Kingdom: Animalia
- Phylum: Arthropoda
- Clade: Pancrustacea
- Class: Insecta
- Order: Diptera
- Family: Acroceridae
- Genus: Ogcodes
- Species: O. gibbosus

Binomial name
- Ogcodes gibbosus (Linnaeus, 1758)

Synonyms
- Musca gibbosa Linnaeus, 1758

= Ogcodes gibbosus =

Species of fly

Ogcodes gibbosus is a Palearctic species of fly in the family Acroceridae.

A fly with a body length of 3 to 7 mm. Its shiny black body is covered with grayish-yellow hair. The entire surface of the thoracic scales is white. The wings are transparent, and the halteres have yellow heads.Squamae with pale border. The legs have dark brown femora with yellow tips. Males have yellow abdominal tergites with black bands widened in the middle on the front edges or with extensive bone-yellow patches, forming a distinctive pattern. The female's abdomen is black with narrow yellow bands on the rear edges of the tergites.
