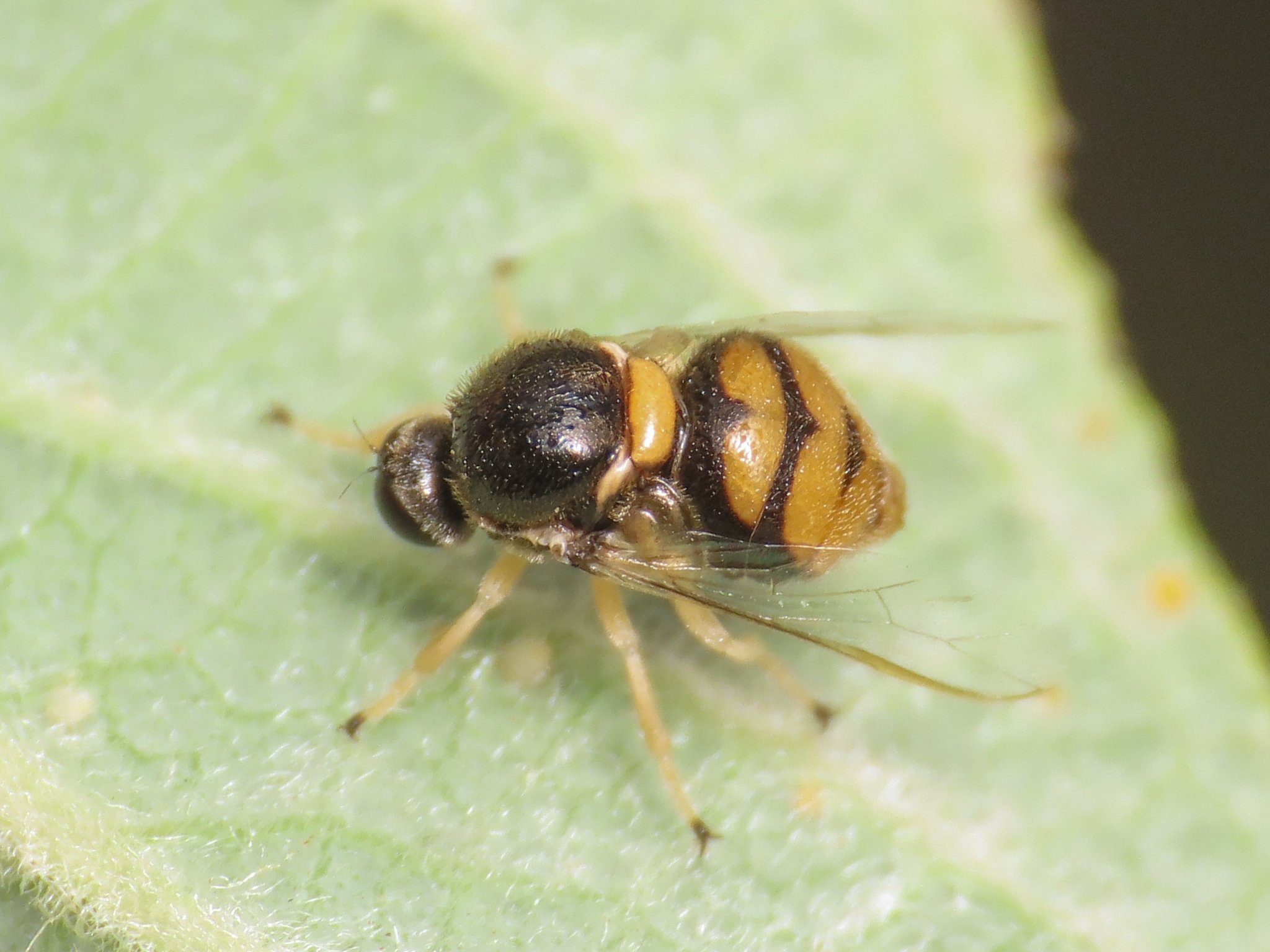
- Acrocera orbiculus, Italy

Scientific classification
- Domain: Eukaryota
- Kingdom: Animalia
- Phylum: Arthropoda
- Class: Insecta
- Order: Diptera
- Family: Acroceridae
- Subfamily: Acrocerinae; Leach, 1815

Genera
- See text

= Acrocerinae =

Subfamily of flies

Acrocerinae is a subfamily of small-headed flies in the family Acroceridae. Their larvae are endoparasites of araneomorph spiders, with the exception of Carvalhoa appendiculata which can develop as ectoparasitoids on their host spiders. Traditionally, the subfamily included the genera now placed in Cyrtinae and Ogcodinae, but the subfamily in this sense was found to be polyphyletic and was split up in 2019.

== Systematics ==
The subfamily includes two extant genera and one extinct:

- Acrocera Meigen, 1803
- Carvalhoa Koçak & Kemal, 2013
- †Schlingeromyia Grimaldi & Hauser in Grimaldi, Arillo, Cumming & Hauser, 2011

The extinct fly genus †Burmacyrtus Grimaldi & Hauser in Grimaldi, Arillo, Cumming & Hauser, 2011 was originally placed in this subfamily as well, but according to Gillung & Winterton (2017) it is not considered an acrocerid.
