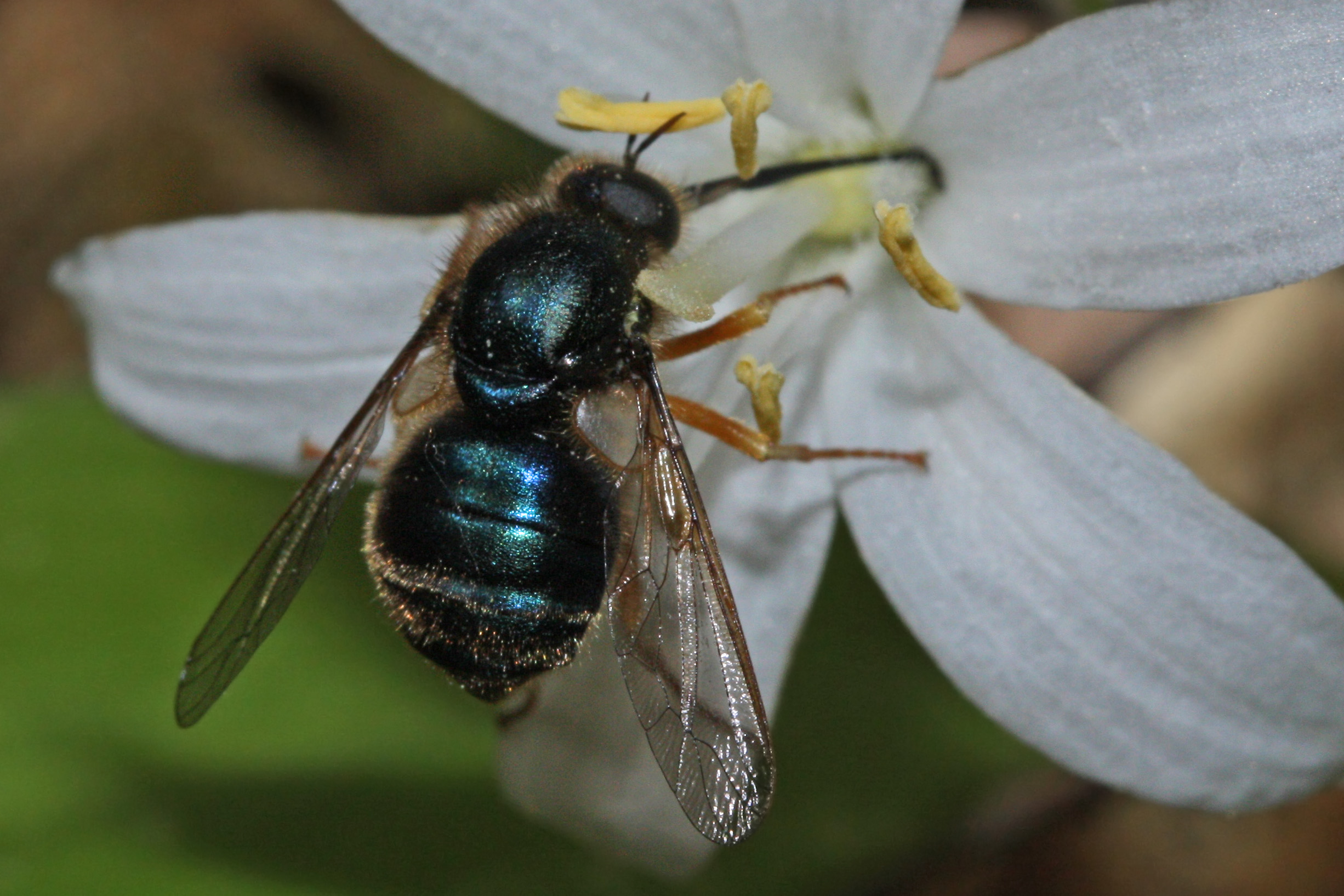
- Eulonchus sapphirinus

Scientific classification
- Domain: Eukaryota
- Kingdom: Animalia
- Phylum: Arthropoda
- Class: Insecta
- Order: Diptera
- Family: Acroceridae
- Subfamily: Panopinae; Schiner, 1867

Genera
- See text

= Panopinae =

Subfamily of flies

Panopinae is a subfamily of small-headed flies (Acroceridae). Their larvae are endoparasites of spiders in the infraorder Mygalomorphae.

== Genera ==
The subfamily includes 24 extant genera:

- Apelleia Bellardi, 1862
- Apsona Westwood, 1876
- Archipialea Schlinger, 1973
- Arrhynchus Philippi, 1871
- Astomella Latreille, 1809
- Astomelloides Schlinger, 1959
- Camposella Cole, 1919
- Coquena Schlinger in Schlinger, Gillung & Borkent, 2013
- Corononcodes Speiser, 1920
- Eulonchus Gerstaecker, 1856
- Exetasis Walker, 1852
- Lasia Wiedemann, 1824
- Lasioides Gil Collado, 1928
- Leucopsina Westwood, 1876
- Mesophysa Macquart, 1838
- Ocnaea Erichson, 1840
- Panops Lamarck, 1804
- Physegastrella Brunetti, 1926
- Pialea Erichson, 1840
- Psilodera Gray in Griffith & Pidgeon, 1832
- Pterodontia Gray in Griffith & Pidgeon, 1832
- Pteropexus Macquart, 1846
- Rhysogaster Aldrich, 1927
- Stenopialea Speiser, 1920
