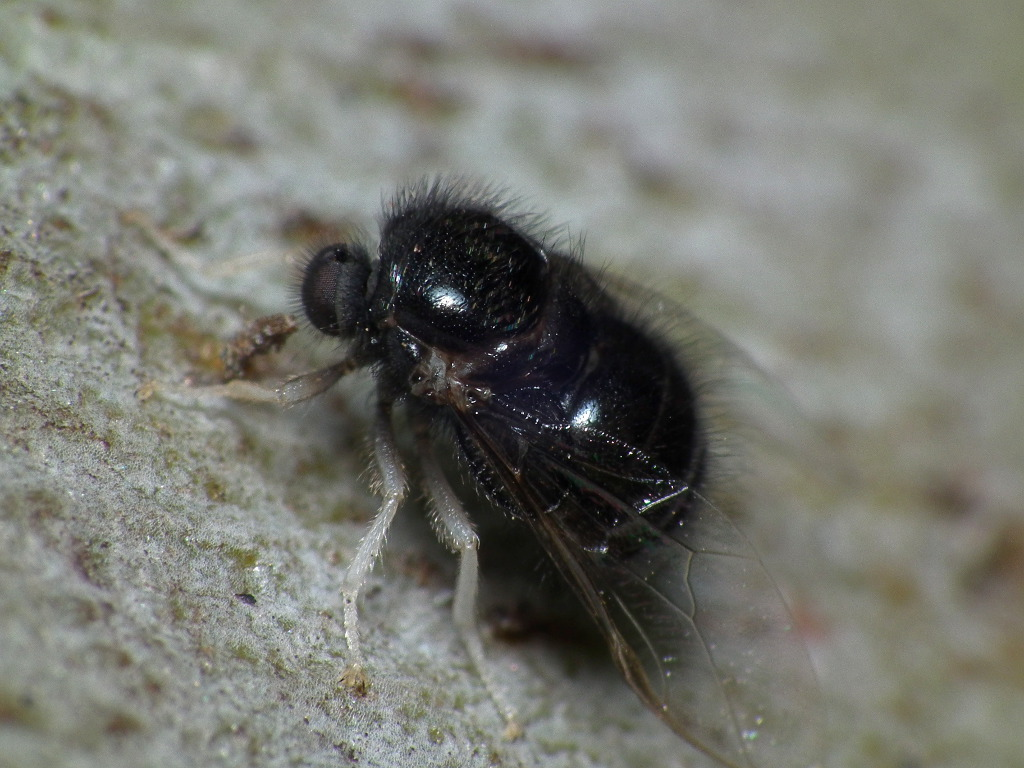
- Pterodontia sp. fly

Scientific classification
- Kingdom: Animalia
- Phylum: Arthropoda
- Clade: Pancrustacea
- Class: Insecta
- Superorder: Panorpida
- Clade: Antliophora
- Order: Diptera
- Suborder: Brachycera
- Superfamily: Nemestrinoidea
- Family: Acroceridae; Leach, 1815

Subfamilies
- Acrocerinae; †Archocyrtinae; Cyrtinae; Ogcodinae; Panopinae; Philopotinae

Synonyms
- Cyrtidae; Ogcodidae; Oncodidae

= Acroceridae =

Small-headed flies Temporal range: Late Jurassic–Present

Family of flies

The Acroceridae are a small family of flies. They have a hump-backed appearance with a strikingly small head, generally with a long proboscis for accessing nectar. They are rare and not widely known. The most frequently applied common names are small-headed flies or hunch-back flies. Many are bee or wasp mimics. Because they are parasitoids of spiders, they also are sometimes known as spider flies.

== Description ==
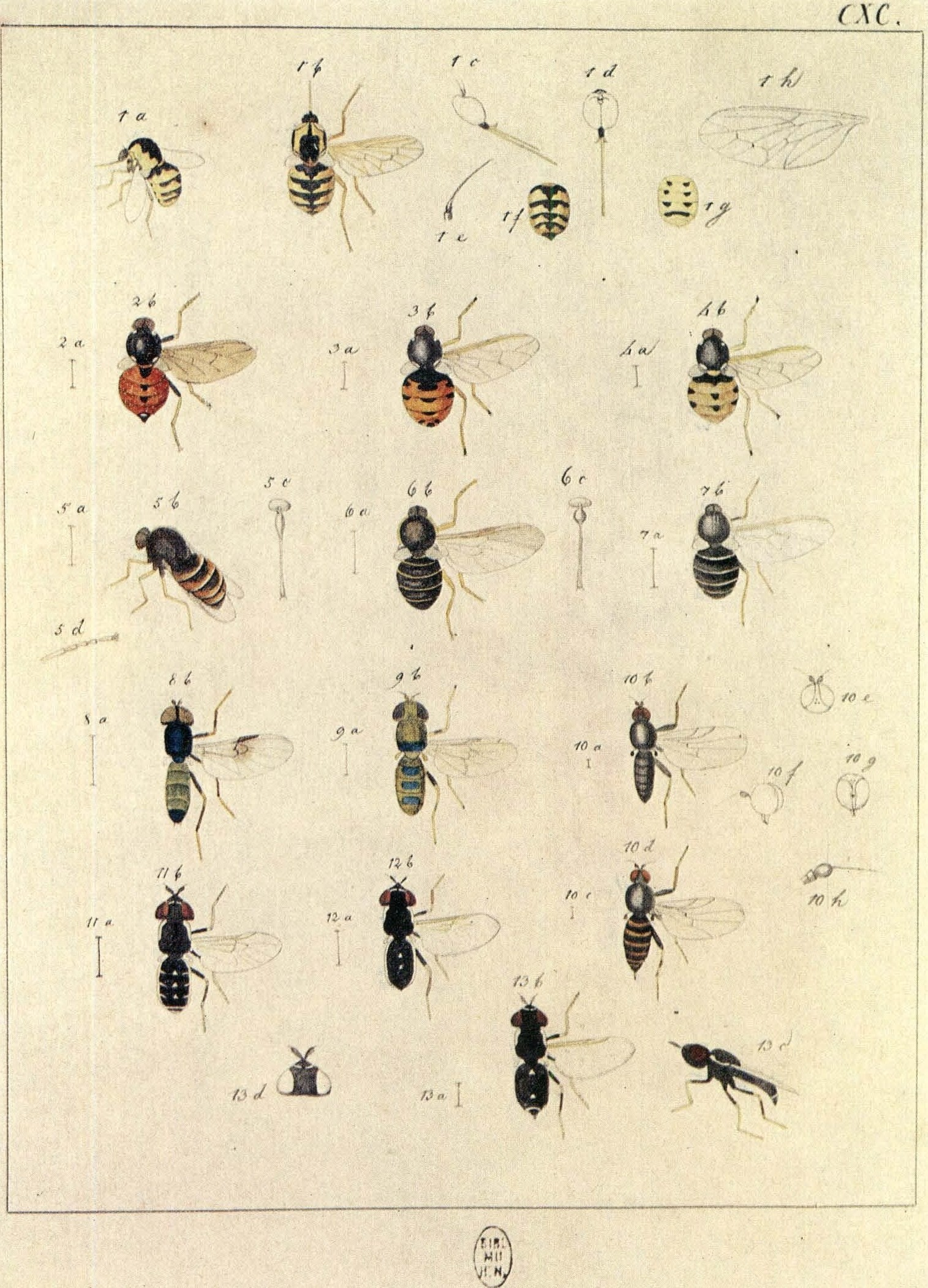
Acroceridae plate from Johann Wilhelm Meigen's Europäischen Zweiflügeligen

The Acroceridae vary in size from small to fairly large, about the size of large bees, with a wingspan over 25 mm in some species. As a rule, both sexes have tiny heads and a characteristic hump-backed appearance because of the large, rounded thorax.

In appearance, they are compact flies without major bristles, but many species have a bee-like hairiness on their bodies, and some are bee or wasp mimics. In most species, the eyes are holoptic in both sexes, the heads seemingly composed mainly of the large faceted eyes. This is in contrast to many insects in which the males have larger (even holoptic) eyes, whereas the females have normal eyes. The squamae are disproportionately large, completely covering the halteres, and the abdomen has an inflated appearance, often practically globular. The tarsi are equipped with large claws with three pulvilli below them.

== Taxonomy ==
The Acroceridae are a small family in the Brachycera. They are members of the infraorder Muscomorpha, and DNA studies suggest that they are most closely related to the families Nemestrinidae and Bombyliidae. A 2013 analysis of morphological data suggested the Acroceridae were a sister group to the Asiloidea and Eremoneura.

The roughly 520 species are placed in 50 genera. In 2019, a revised classification of the family based on phylogenetic studies was published, listing five extant subfamilies and one extinct subfamily containing Archocyrtus from the Late Jurassic Karabastau Formation of Kazakhstan.

Obsolete synonyms for Acroceridae include Cyrtidae, Oncodidae, and Ogcodidae.

== Distribution and habitat ==
Acroceridae are cosmopolitan in distribution, but nowhere abundant. They appear episodically and in most places are rarely observed; of more than 500 species described, most are known from fewer than 10 specimens. They occur most commonly in semiarid tropical locations.

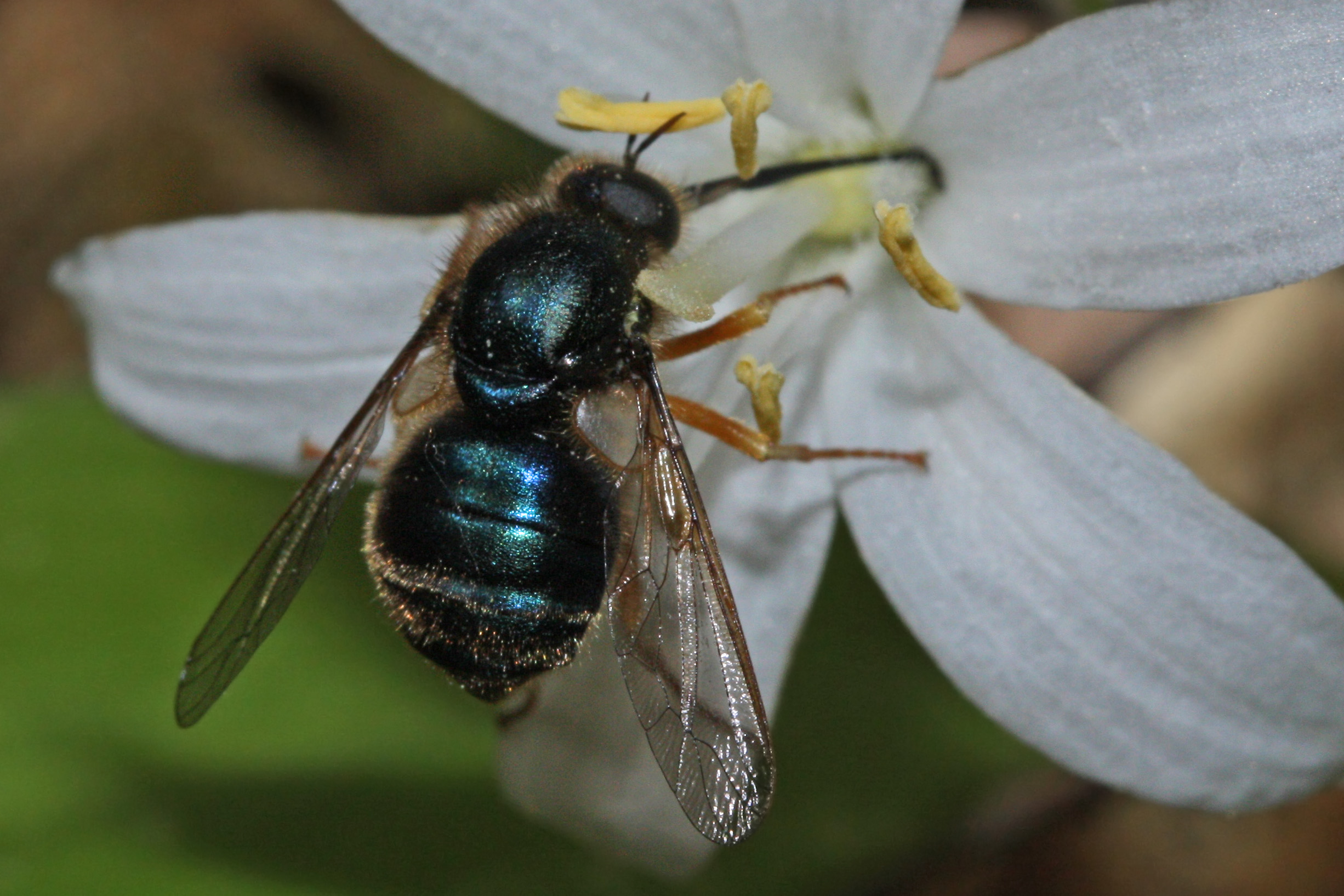
Eulonchus sapphirinus feeding on Clintonia uniflora

== Behaviour ==
As far as is known, all Acroceridae are parasitoids of spiders. They are most commonly collected when a spider from the field is brought into captivity. As in the related families, Bombyliidae and Nemestrinidae, members of the family undergo hypermetamorphosis: the adults do not seek out their hosts; instead, the first-instar larva is a planidium. Females lay large number of eggs, up to 5,000, and after hatching, the planidia seek out spiders. They do not resemble the triungulin of most beetles with a hypermetamorphosis, but do resemble the triungulin of Stylops. The larva can move with a looping movement like a leech or inchworm, and can leap several millimetres into the air. When a spider contacts an acrocerid planidium, the planidium grabs hold, crawls up the spider's legs to its body, and forces its way through the body wall, usually at an articulation membrane. Often, it lodges near a book lung, where it may remain for years before completing its development. Mature larvae pupate outside the host.

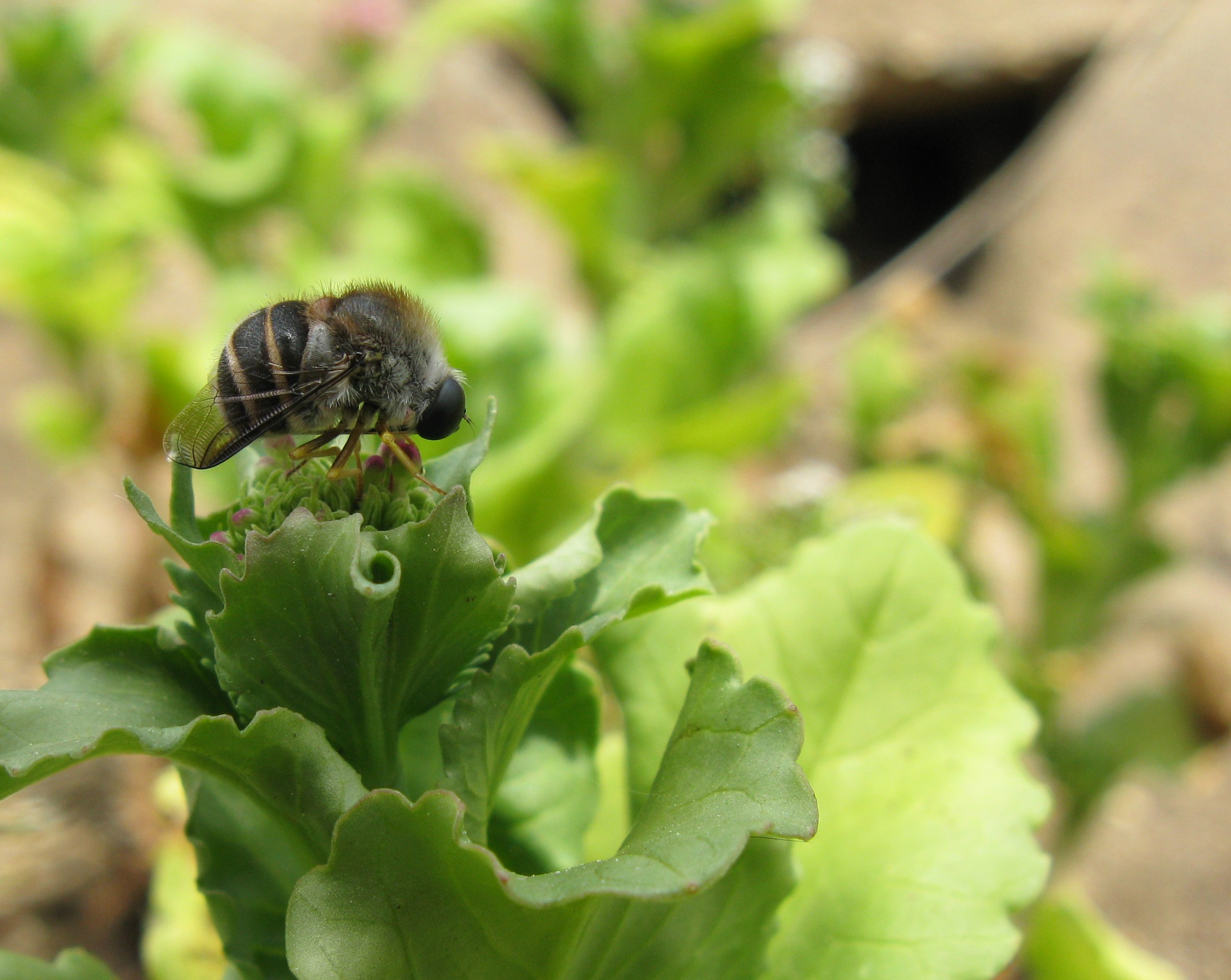
Psilodera fasciata, showing the proboscis below the body, holoptic eyes, texture of wings, and bee mimicry

The adults of most species, like various members of the Tabanidae, Nemestrinidae, and Bombyliidae, are nectar feeders with exceptionally long probosces, sometimes longer than the entire body length of the insect. Unlike the other families, however, when not deploying the proboscis for feeding, the Acroceridae carry it lengthwise medially beneath the body, instead of projecting forward. As a result, the proboscis might escape casual notice, though careful inspection may reveal it projecting slightly behind the abdomen.

Flies are usually found in small numbers on plants in July and August in the Palearctic realm.
