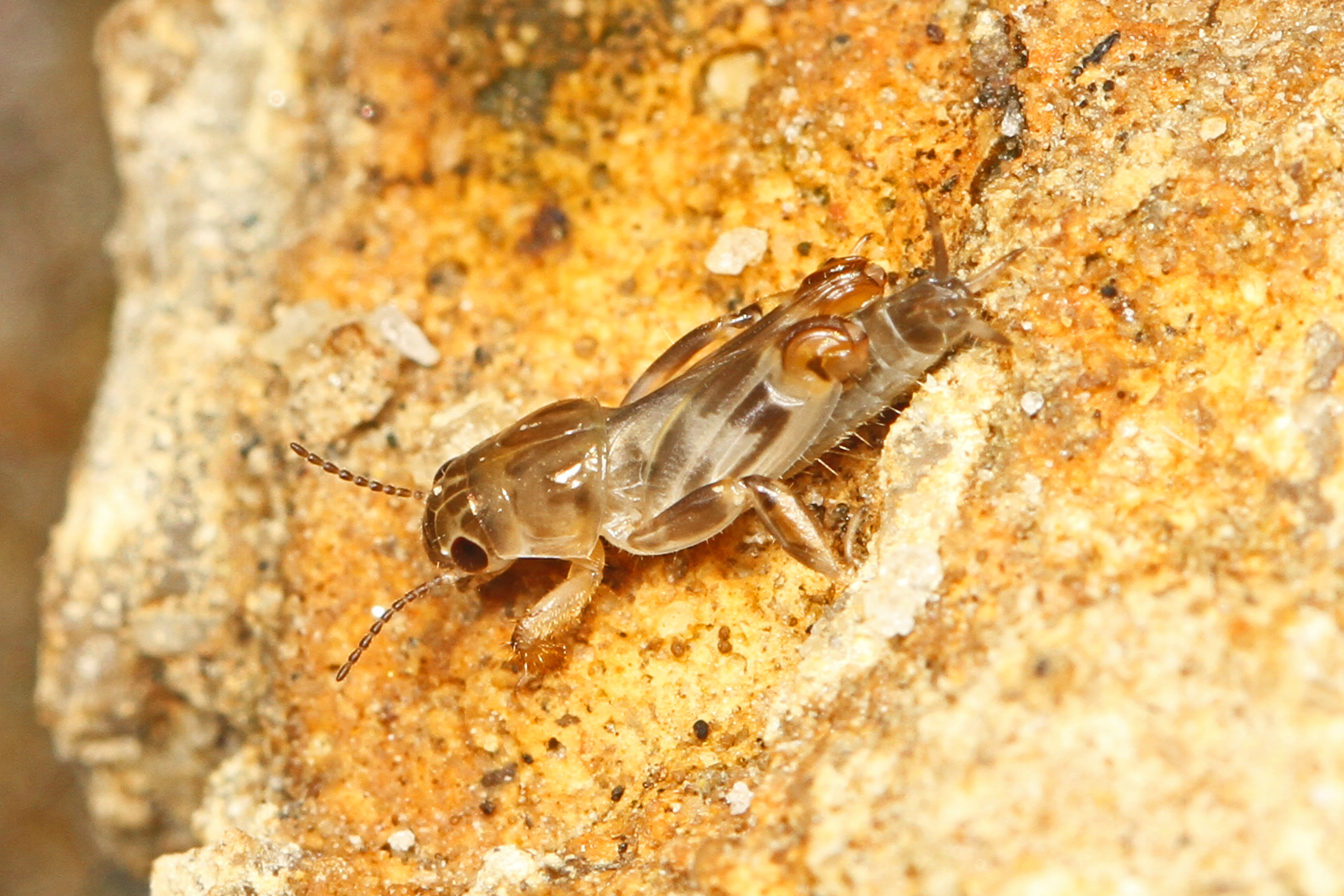

Scientific classification
- Domain: Eukaryota
- Kingdom: Animalia
- Phylum: Arthropoda
- Class: Insecta
- Order: Orthoptera
- Suborder: Caelifera
- Family: Tridactylidae
- Genus: Neotridactylus
- Species: N. apicialis

Binomial name
- Neotridactylus apicialis (Say, 1825)

Synonyms
- Tridactylus apicialis Say, 1825

= Neotridactylus apicialis =

Species of Caelifera

Neotridactylus apicialis, known generally as larger pygmy mole cricket, is a species of pygmy mole cricket in the family Tridactylidae. Other common names include the larger pygmy locust and larger sand cricket. It is found in North America and South America.
