= Neotridactylus archboldi =

Scientific classification
- Domain: Eukaryota
- Kingdom: Animalia
- Phylum: Arthropoda
- Class: Insecta
- Order: Orthoptera
- Suborder: Caelifera
- Family: Tridactylidae
- Genus: Neotridactylus
- Species: N. archboldi

Binomial name
- Neotridactylus archboldi Deyrup & Eisner, 1996

Species of Caelifera

Neotridactylus archboldi, the Archbold pygmy mole cricket, or scrub pygmy mole cricket, is a species of pygmy mole cricket in the family Tridactylidae. It is endemic to Florida, where it is found in Florida scrub on the Lake Wales Ridge.
