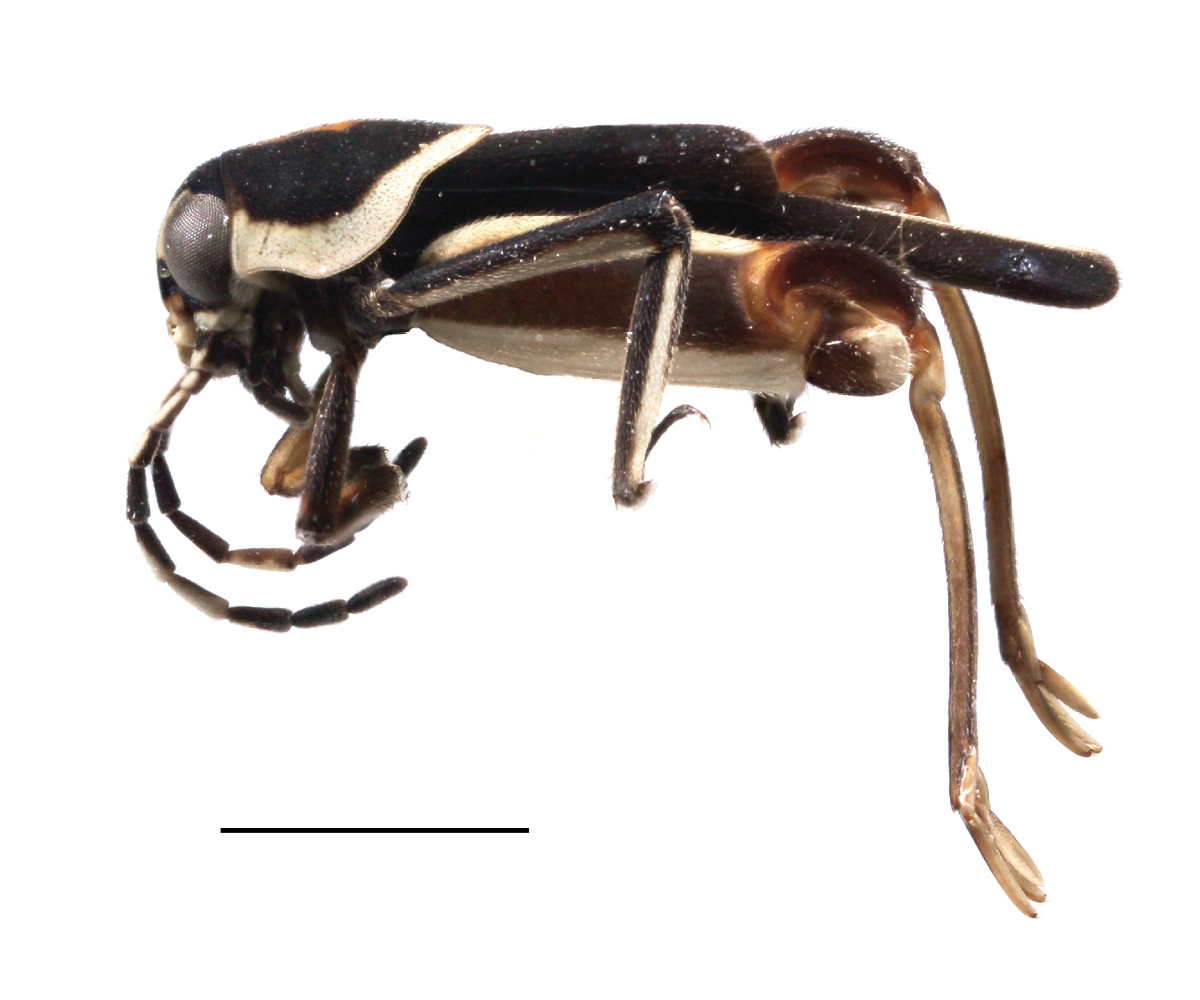
- Ripipteryx mopana

Scientific classification
- Kingdom: Animalia
- Phylum: Arthropoda
- Class: Insecta
- Order: Orthoptera
- Suborder: Caelifera
- Infraorder: Tridactylidea
- Superfamily: Tridactyloidea
- Family: Ripipterygidae; Ander, 1939

Genera
- †Archaicaripipteryx Xu, Zhang, Jarzembowski & Fang, 2020; Ripipteryginae; Mirhipipteryx Günther, 1969; Ripipteryx Newman, 1834

Synonyms
- Rhipipterygidae Ander, 1939 (incorrect original spelling)

= Ripipterygidae =

Mud crickets Temporal range: Cenomanian-Recent

Family of Caelifera

Ripipterygidae is a family of insects in the order Orthoptera. Members of the family are commonly known as mud crickets.

== Description ==
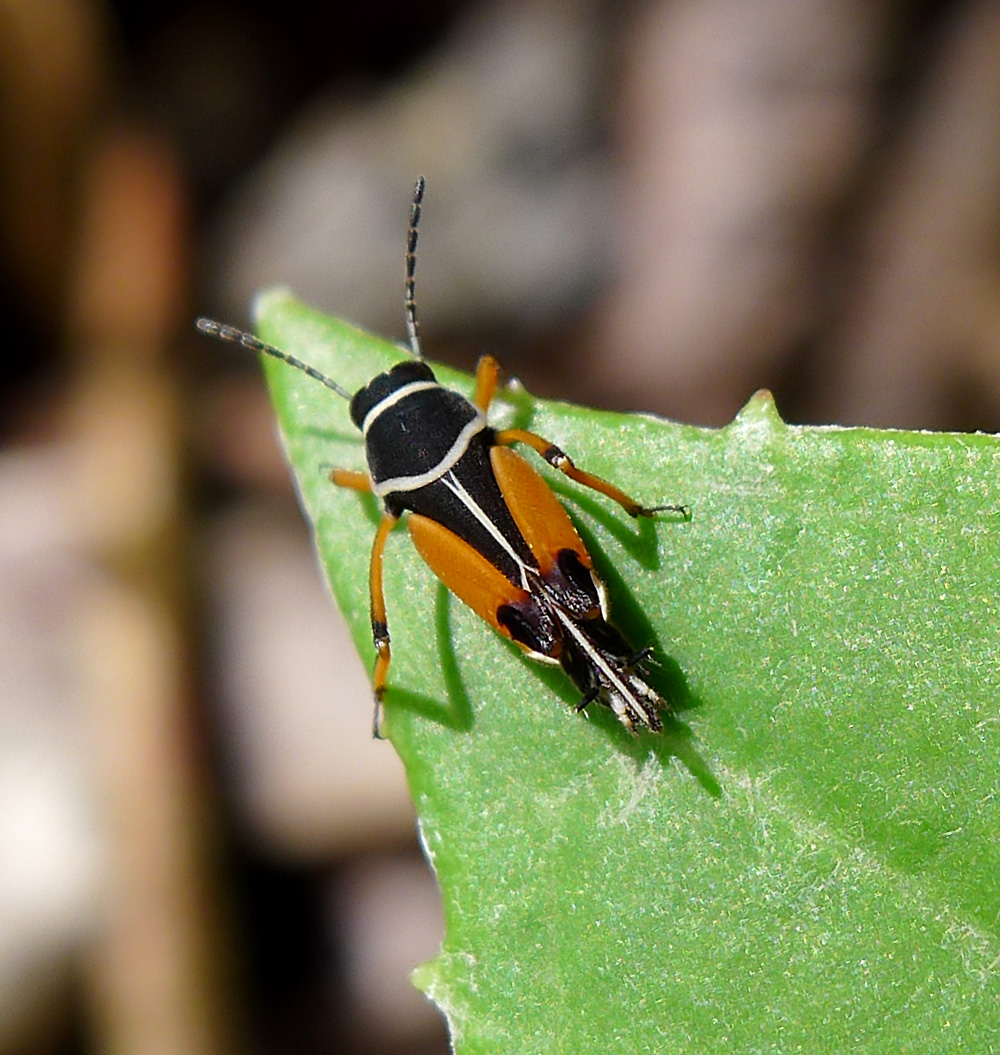
Ripipteryx sp. (possibly R. biolleyi), Cartago, Costa Rica

Ripipterygids are small, often dark-colored, cricket-like orthopterans, between 3 and 14 mm in length. They closely resemble the related tridactylids. Like tridactylids, they have greatly expanded hind femora, and have the ability to swim and jump from the surface of water. They can be distinguished from tridactylids by their uninflated tibiae on the middle pair of legs, unsegmented cerci, rows of comblike teeth on the epiproct, and setae at the tips of the cerciform lobes on the paraproct, as well as through characters of the genitalia.

Species in the genus Ripipteryx are typically black or dark brown and often metallic; many are boldly colored or strikingly patterned, with sharply contrasting white, yellow, and/or red markings. Members of the genus Mirhipipteryx are typically smaller and more drably colored.

== Distribution and habitat ==
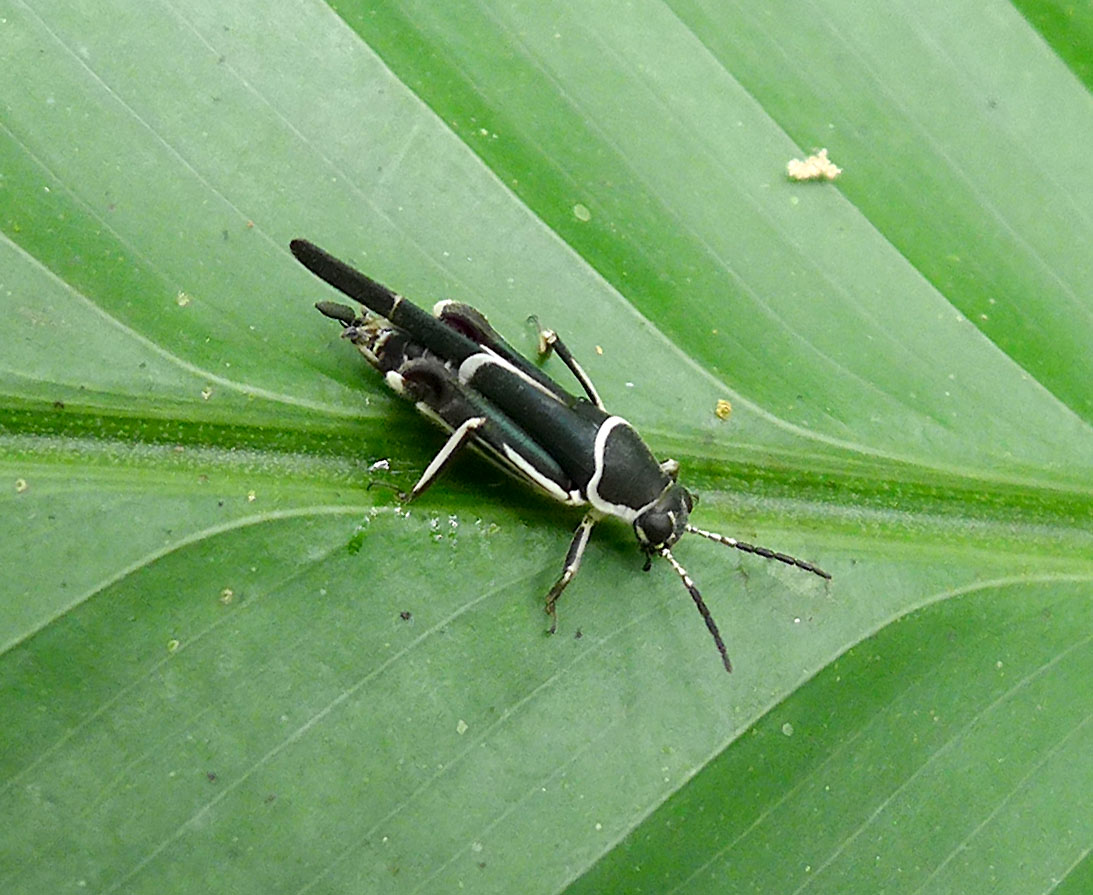
Ripipteryx limbata, Cartago, Costa Rica

Ripipterygids are restricted to the Neotropics. They can be found from southern Mexico south to central South America. Like tridactylids, they are typically found in riparian areas, on bare soil, sand, and mud, as well as on rocks, and – in some species – low vegetation in, near, or above water. In at least some species, individuals are not distributed evenly throughout appropriate habitat, but rather are found in groups.

== Biology ==
Ripipterygids have been comparatively little-studied, and many aspects of their biology are poorly known, with behavioral observations having only been made on a handful of species.

=== Locomotion ===
Like tridactylids, ripipterygids walk quadrupedally using only their first two pairs of legs, and the hind legs are only used for jumping and swimming. Ripipterygids fly when disturbed, often landing on water and swimming back to shore.

=== Diet and foraging ===
Ripipterygids are herbivorous, and have been recorded feeding on a variety of different plants, as well as foraging on the ground. Foraging ripipterygids may leave networks of shallow tracks in sandy or muddy soil near waterways.

=== Burrowing ===
At least some ripipterygids build short burrows or oval-shaped cells in clay soil or sand, on both flat ground and in vertical banks. These burrows are used for temporary shelter, and may also be used for protection while molting.

=== Daily activity pattern ===
Species vary in their activity patterns; some are most active during dawn and dusk, and others are active throughout the day even in direct sunlight. One species studied was nocturnal.

=== Breeding ===
In Ripipteryx notata in Uruguay (near the southern limit of the family's geographic distribution), females oviposit eggs singly in bare soil in spring and summer. Nymphs are present in summer and early autumn (whereas adults are present year-round). Unlike in grasshoppers, embryonic molt has not been observed to occur in ripipterygids.

=== Predation ===
Fish have been recorded preying on swimming ripipterygids.

== Taxonomy and evolution ==
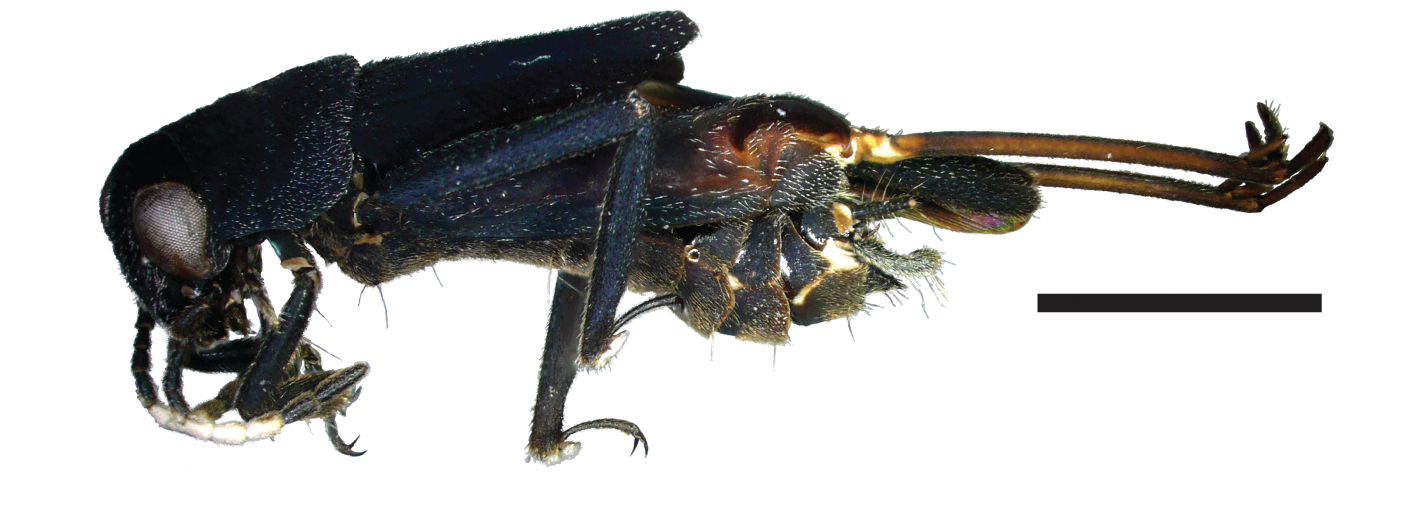
Ripipteryx diegoi

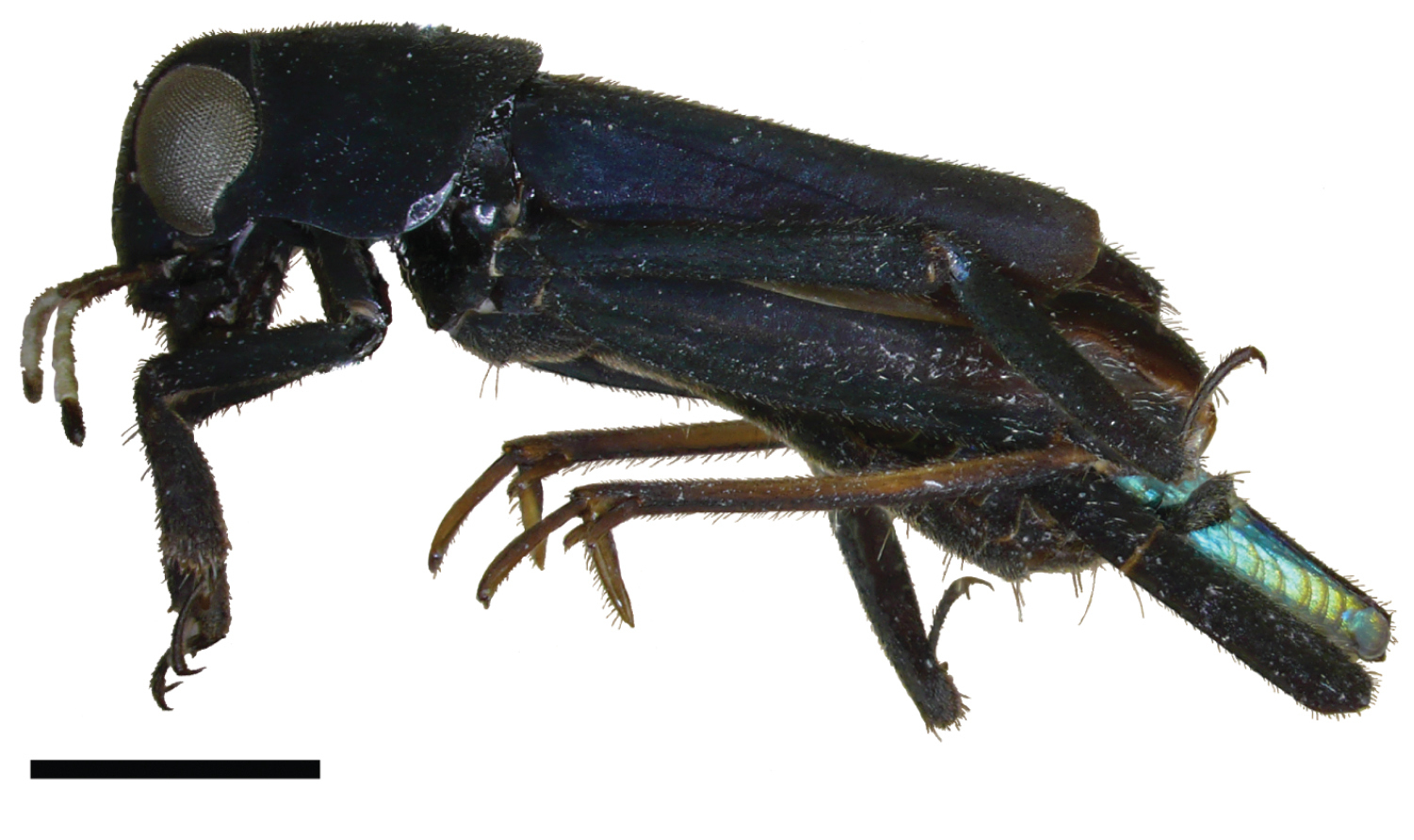
Ripipteryx gorgonaensis

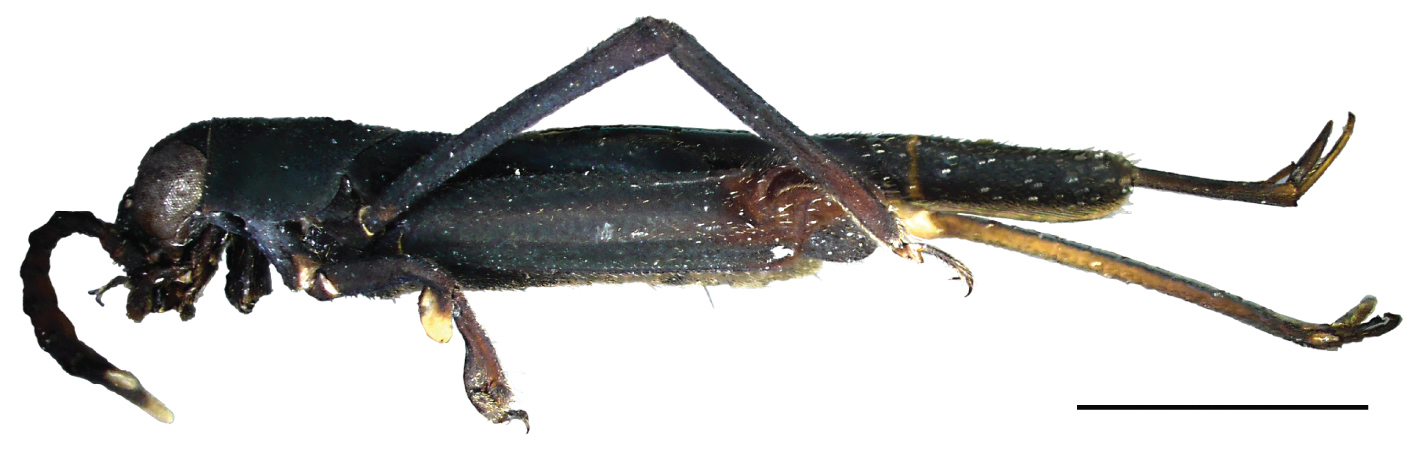
Ripipteryx guacharoensis

Ripipterygids, tridactylids, and sandgropers comprise the superfamily Tridactyloidea within the suborder Caelifera (grasshoppers and relatives). The tridactyloids are sister to the remainder of Caelifera. Within Tridactyloidea, ripipterygids are sister to tridactylids; the two families are estimated to have diverged between 150 and 175 million years ago.

Ripipterygids were initially included in the family Tridactylidae. They were first elevated to family rank (as Rhipipterygidae) in 1939. The classification of the family was extensively revised in a series of works by Kurt Günther between the 1960s and 1990s. However, the taxonomic diversity of the family, particularly in Central America, is still incompletely known.

Two extant genera of ripipterygids are recognized: Mirhipipteryx and Ripipteryx. Since the 1960s, the genus Ripipteryx has been divided into five species groups, based primarily on characters of the male genitalia. However, there is evidence that these groups are not monophyletic. In addition, Ripipteryx itself may be paraphyletic with respect to Mirhipipteryx, suggesting additional taxonomic revision of the family is required.

Both Mirhipipteryx and Ripipteryx have representatives distributed throughout the geographic distribution of the family, as do all of the Ripipteryx species groups apart from the Scrofulosa group, the members of which are all restricted to Central America.

=== List of species ===
The following recent genera, species and subspecies of Ripipterygidae are recognized by OSF:

- Mirhipipteryx Günther, 1969
  - Mirhipipteryx acuminata Günther, 1969
  - Mirhipipteryx andensis Günther, 1969
  - Mirhipipteryx biloba (Hebard, 1928)
    - M. b. aberrans Günther, 1989
    - M. b. biloba (Hebard, 1928)
    - M. b. chiriquensis Günther, 1969
    - M. b. incurvata Günther, 1989
    - M. b. riofriensis Günther, 1969
    - M. b. sevillensis Günther, 1969
  - Mirhipipteryx columbiana (Günther, 1963)
    - M. c. columbiana (Günther, 1963)
    - M. c. tenaensis Günther, 1969
  - Mirhipipteryx disparilobata Günther, 1989
  - Mirhipipteryx hebardi (Chopard, 1931)
  - Mirhipipteryx hondurica Günther, 1969
  - Mirhipipteryx hubbelli Günther, 1969
  - Mirhipipteryx imperfecta Günther, 1989
  - Mirhipipteryx lilo Günther, 1969
    - M. lil. granchacensis Günther, 1977
    - M. lil. lilo Günther, 1969
  - Mirhipipteryx lineata Günther, 1989
    - M. lin. anchicayensis Günther, 1994
    - M. lin. lineata Günther, 1989
  - Mirhipipteryx lucieni Günther, 1969
  - Mirhipipteryx magdalenensis Günther, 1969
  - Mirhipipteryx panamica Günther, 1969
  - Mirhipipteryx peruviana (Saussure, 1896)
  - Mirhipipteryx phallica Günther, 1969
  - Mirhipipteryx pronotopunctata Günther, 1969
  - Mirhipipteryx pulicaria (Saussure, 1896)
    - M. pu. interposita Günther, 1969
    - M. pu. pulicaria (Saussure, 1896)
  - Mirhipipteryx schuchmanni Günther, 1994
  - Mirhipipteryx striatipes (Chopard, 1954)
  - Mirhipipteryx triangulata Günther, 1969
  - Mirhipipteryx unispinosa Günther, 1989
  - Mirhipipteryx variabilis Günther, 1969
  - Mirhipipteryx venezuelensis Günther, 1976
- Ripipteryx Newman, 1834
  - Limbata-Marginata group
    - Ripipteryx boliviana Bruner, 1916
    - Ripipteryx cruciata Bruner, 1916
    - Ripipteryx cyanipennis Saussure, 1874
    - Ripipteryx furcata Günther, 1976
    - Ripipteryx hydrodroma Saussure, 1896
    - Ripipteryx lawrencei Günther, 1969
    - Ripipteryx limbata (Burmeister, 1838)
    - Ripipteryx marginata Newman, 1834
    - Ripipteryx notata (Burmeister, 1838)
    - Ripipteryx ornata Chopard, 1927
    - Ripipteryx rivularia Saussure, 1896
    - Ripipteryx saopauliensis Günther, 1969
    - Ripipteryx trilobata Saussure, 1874
    - Ripipteryx trimaculata Günther, 1969
  - Crassicornis group
    - Ripipteryx antennata Hebard, 1924
    - Ripipteryx atra Serville, 1838
    - Ripipteryx capotensis Günther, 1970
    - Ripipteryx crassicornis Günther, 1969
    - Ripipteryx gorgonaensis Baena-Bejarano & Heads, 2015
    - Ripipteryx laticornis Günther, 1963
    - Ripipteryx nodicornis Hebard, 1924
  - Forceps group
    - Ripipteryx carbonaria Saussure, 1896
    - Ripipteryx diegoi Baena-Bejarano, 2015
    - Ripipteryx ecuadoriensis Günther, 1962
    - Ripipteryx forceps Saussure, 1896
    - Ripipteryx nigra Günther, 1963
    - Ripipteryx paraprocessata Günther, 1989
    - Ripipteryx pasochoensis Heads, 2010
    - Ripipteryx processata Günther, 1969
  - Marginipennis group
    - Ripipteryx amazonica Günther, 1969
    - Ripipteryx brasiliensis Günther, 1969
    - Ripipteryx bruneri Chopard, 1920
    - Ripipteryx difformipes Chopard, 1956
    - Ripipteryx femorata Chopard, 1956
    - Ripipteryx guacharoensis Baena-Bejarano & Heads, 2015
    - Ripipteryx insignis Chopard, 1937
    - Ripipteryx luteicornis Chopard, 1920
    - Ripipteryx marginipennis Bruner, 1916
    - Ripipteryx sturmi Günther, 1963
    - Ripipteryx vicina Chopard, 1956
  - Scrofulosa group
    - Ripipteryx biolleyi Saussure, 1896
    - Ripipteryx mediolineata Günther, 1969
    - Ripipteryx mexicana Saussure, 1859
    - Ripipteryx mopana Heads & Taylor, 2012
    - Ripipteryx saltator Saussure, 1896
    - Ripipteryx saussurei Günther, 1969
    - Ripipteryx scrofulosa Saussure, 1896
    - Ripipteryx tricolor Saussure, 1896

In addition, two fossil species have been described, both based on individuals preserved in amber in regions of the world where the family no longer occurs: Mirhipipteryx antillarum Heads, 2010 (from early Miocene amber from Hispaniola), and Archaicaripipteryx rotunda Xu, Zhang, Jarzembowski & Fang, 2020 (from mid-Cretaceous Burmese amber).
