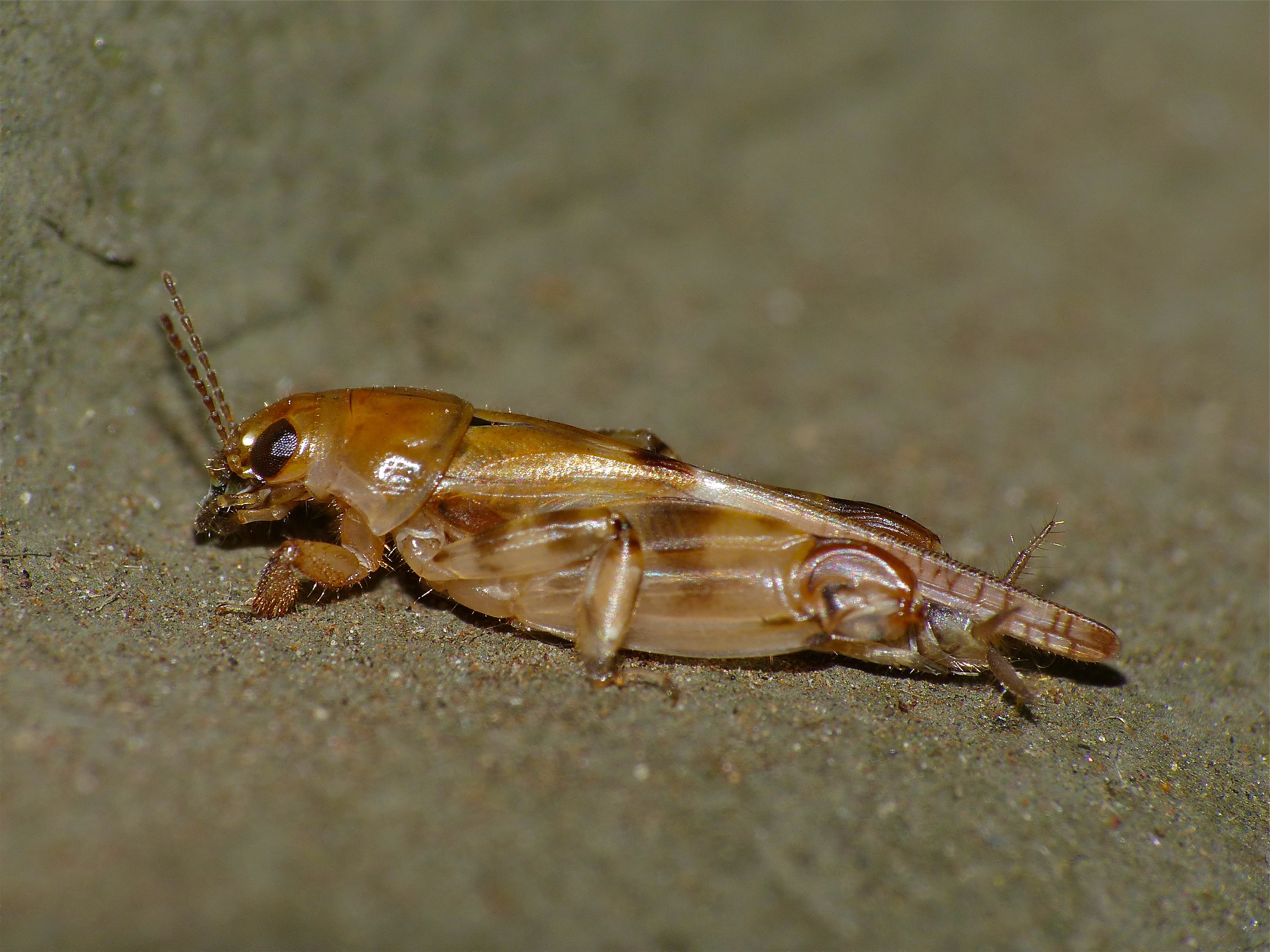
- Tridactylus sp.

Scientific classification
- Kingdom: Animalia
- Phylum: Arthropoda
- Class: Insecta
- Order: Orthoptera
- Suborder: Caelifera
- Infraorder: Tridactylidea; Brullé, 1835

= Tridactylidea =

Order of Caelifera

The infraorder Tridactylidea has a single extant superfamily which includes pygmy mole crickets; they are thought to be sister to all other lineages in the Caelifera, the Orthopteran suborder that includes grasshoppers.

== Superfamilies and families ==
The infraorder consists of two superfamilies, one living and one extinct; the Orthoptera Species File lists the following:

- †Dzhajloutshelloidea Gorochov, 1994
  - †Dzhajloutshellidae Gorochov, 1994
  - †Regiatidae Gorochov, 1995
- Tridactyloidea Brullé, 1835
  - Cylindrachetidae Giglio-Tos, 1914
  - Ripipterygidae Ander, 1939
  - Tridactylidae Brullé, 1835
