= Tridactylus berlandi =

Scientific classification
- Domain: Eukaryota
- Kingdom: Animalia
- Phylum: Arthropoda
- Class: Insecta
- Order: Orthoptera
- Suborder: Caelifera
- Family: Tridactylidae
- Genus: Tridactylus
- Species: T. berlandi

Binomial name
- Tridactylus berlandi Chopard, 1920

Species of Caelifera

Tridactylus berlandi is a species of pygmy mole cricket endemic to Vietnam. The type specimen was taken from the southern region ("Cochinchine") and is deposited in the National Museum of Natural History, France.
