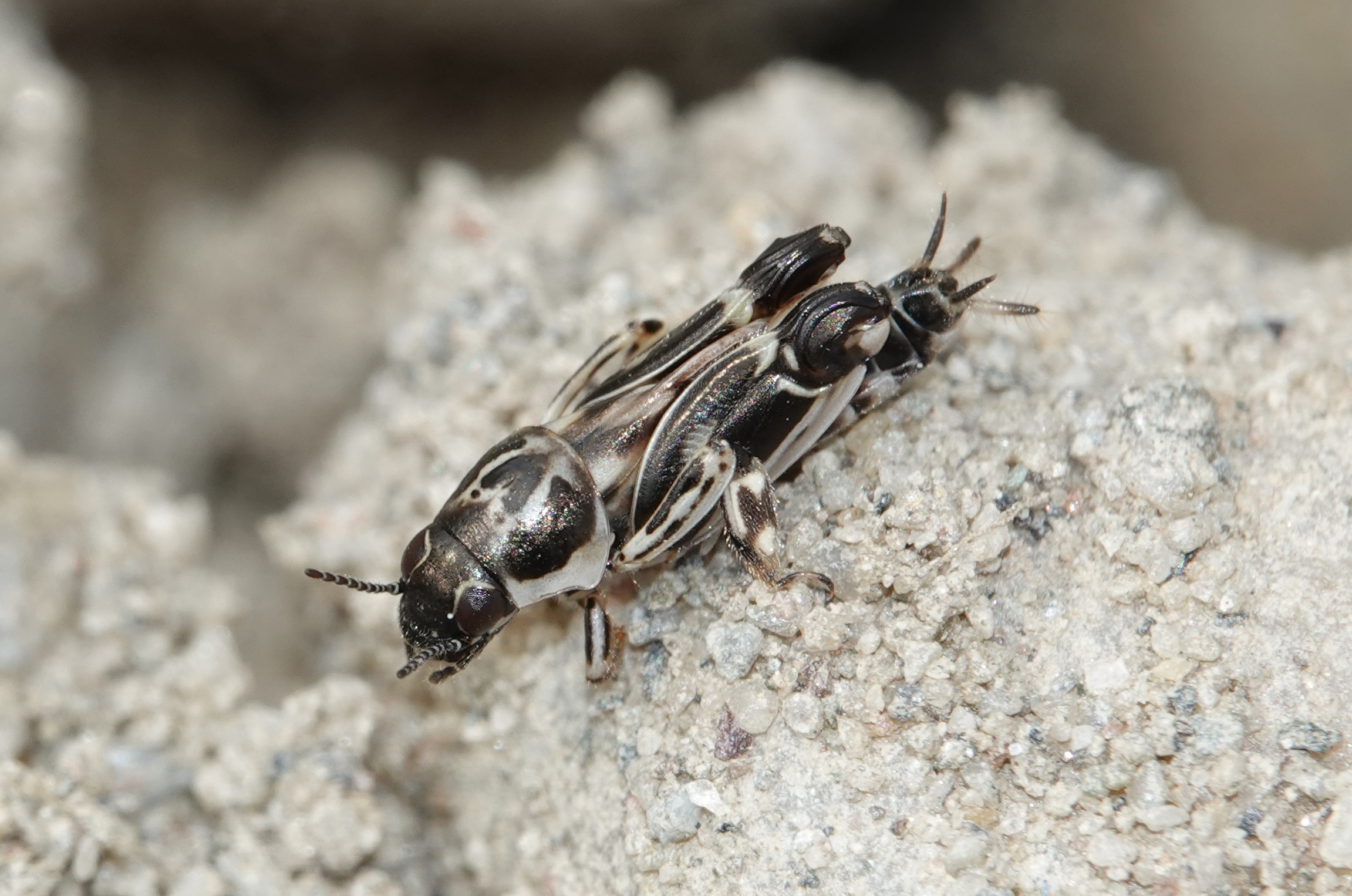

Conservation status
- Least Concern (IUCN 3.1)

Scientific classification
- Kingdom: Animalia
- Phylum: Arthropoda
- Class: Insecta
- Order: Orthoptera
- Suborder: Caelifera
- Family: Tridactylidae
- Genus: Xya
- Species: X. variegata

Binomial name
- Xya variegata Latreille, 1809

= Xya variegata =

Species of cricket

Xya variegata, commonly known as the colourful molehopper, is a species of pygmy mole cricket found in Europe and Asia.
