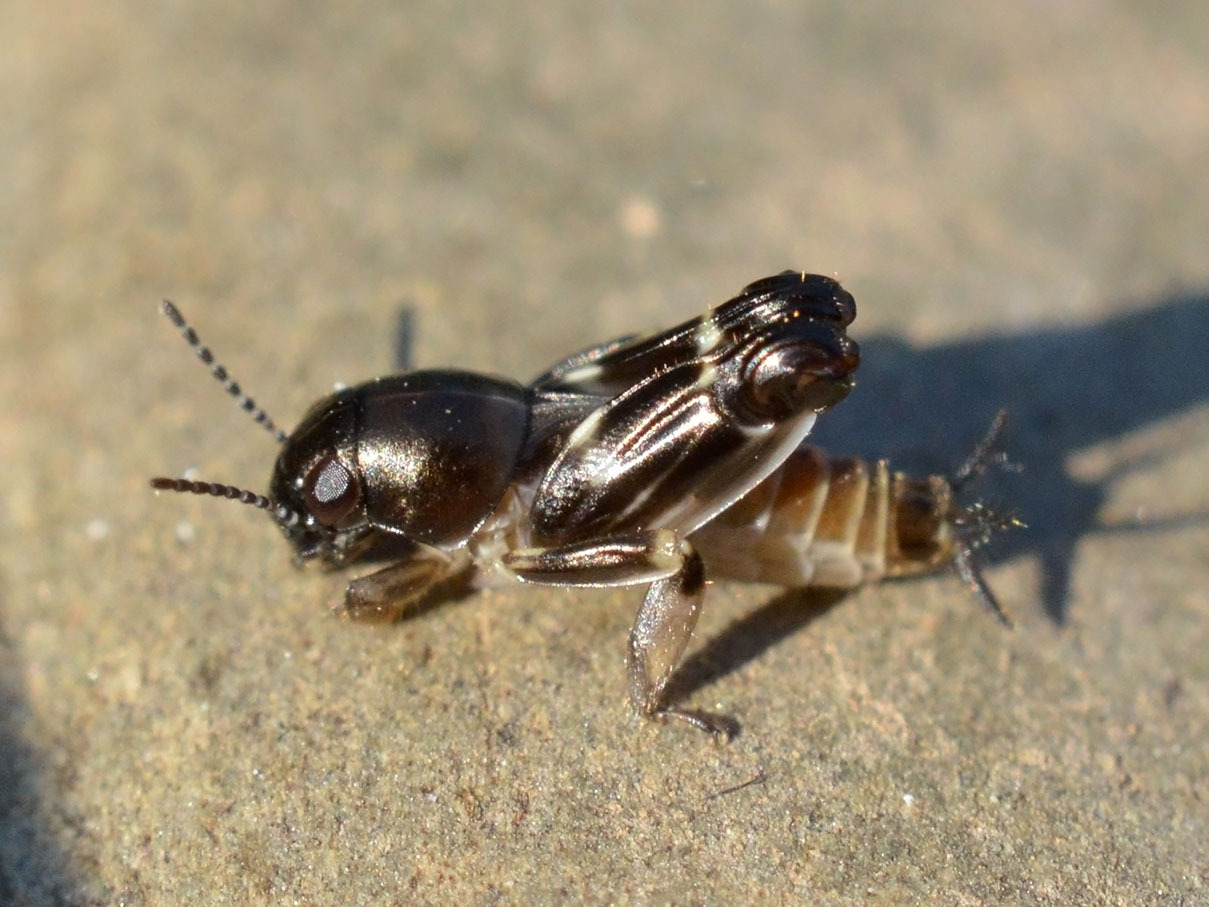

Conservation status
- Least Concern (IUCN 3.1)

Scientific classification
- Kingdom: Animalia
- Phylum: Arthropoda
- Class: Insecta
- Order: Orthoptera
- Suborder: Caelifera
- Family: Tridactylidae
- Genus: Xya
- Species: X. pfaendleri

Binomial name
- Xya pfaendleri Harz, 1970
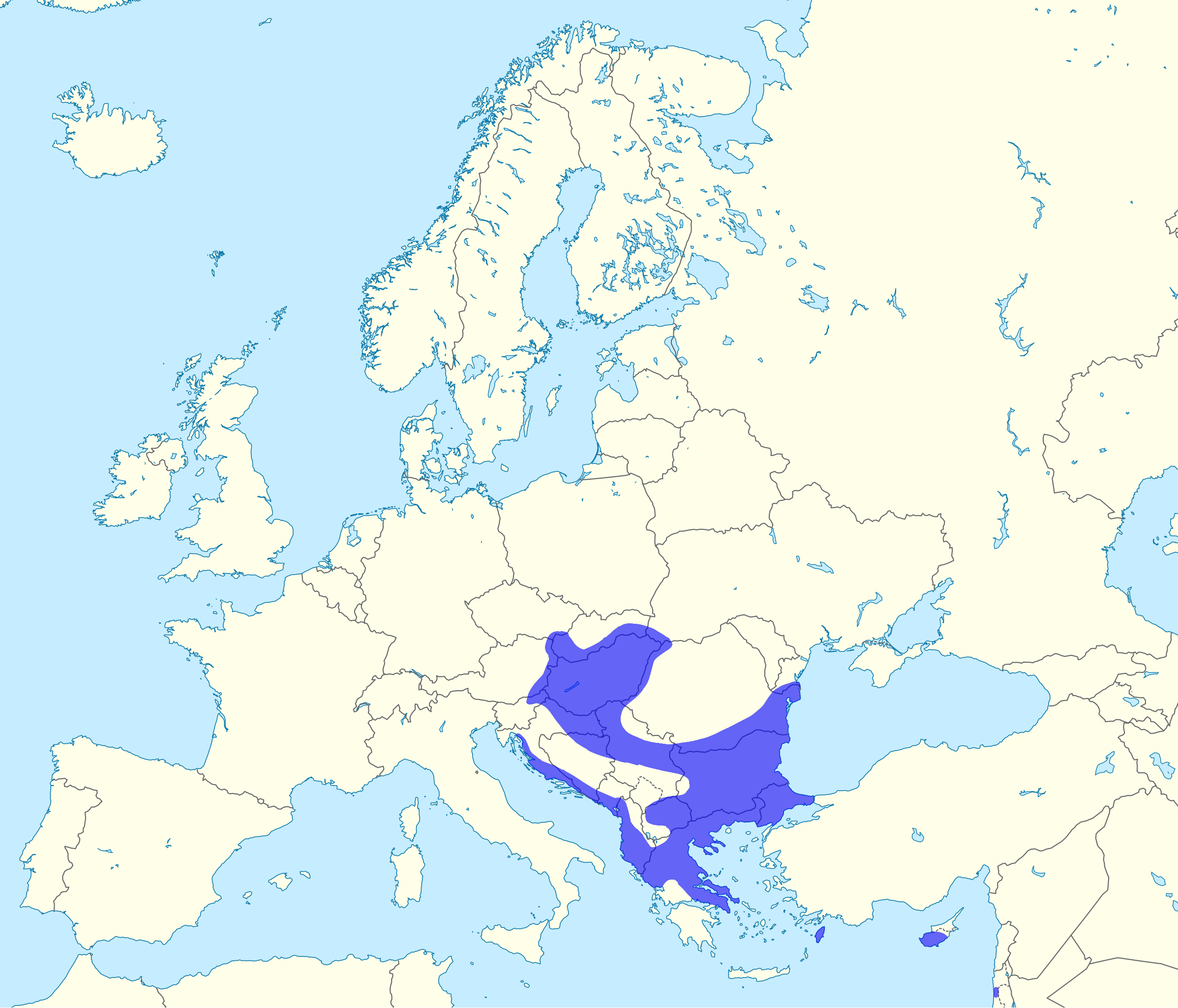

= Xya pfaendleri =

Species of cricket

Xya pfaendleri, also known as Pfaendler's molehopper, is a species of pygmy mole cricket found in Europe and Asia.

== Distribution ==
It is found in Southern Europe, including Hungary, eastern Croatia, western Austria, southern Slovakia, and the Balkan Peninsula (specifically Slovenia, Bosnia and Herzegovina, Serbia, Montenegro, Albania, North Macedonia, Bulgaria, Greece, and European Turkey). Its range also extends to Eastern Europe in southern and western Ukraine, as well as to the Eastern Mediterranean, including southern Romania, Cyprus, Israel, and the Greek mainland with the island of Rhodes.
