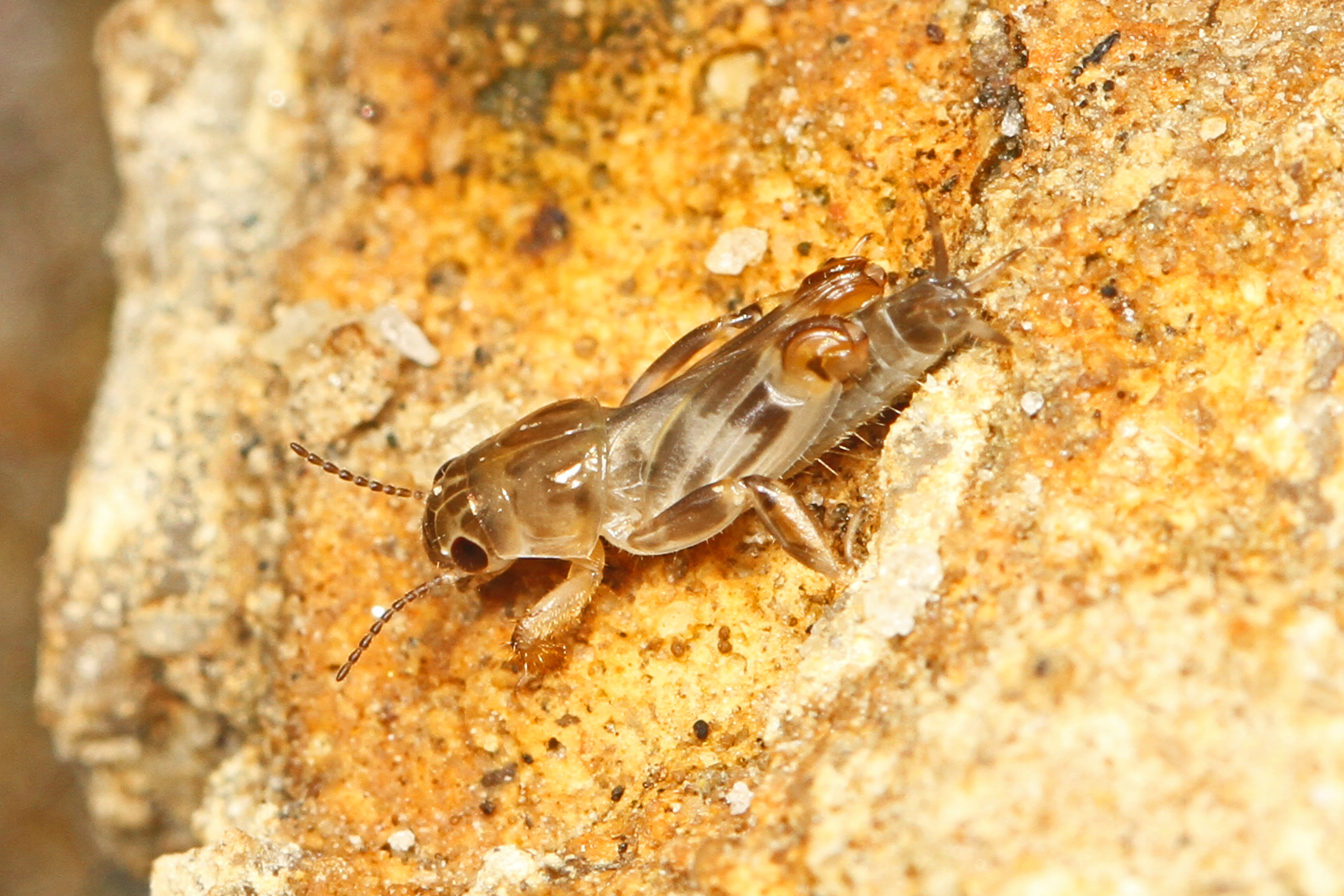
- Neotridactylus apicialis

Scientific classification
- Domain: Eukaryota
- Kingdom: Animalia
- Phylum: Arthropoda
- Class: Insecta
- Order: Orthoptera
- Suborder: Caelifera
- Family: Tridactylidae
- Subfamily: Tridactylinae
- Genus: Neotridactylus; Günther, 1972

= Neotridactylus =

Genus of Caelifera

Neotridactylus is a genus of pygmy mole crickets in the family Tridactylidae, recorded from the Americas. There are about 16 described species in Neotridactylus.

== Species ==
These 16 species belong to the genus Neotridactylus:

- Neotridactylus achavali Günther, 1972
- Neotridactylus albidus Günther, 1976
- Neotridactylus apicialis (Say, 1825) (larger pygmy mole cricket)
- Neotridactylus archboldi Deyrup & Eisner, 1996 (archbold pygmy mole cricket)
- Neotridactylus australis (Bruner, 1916)
- Neotridactylus cantralli Günther, 1976
- Neotridactylus carbonelli Günther, 1972 - type species
- Neotridactylus obscurus (Bruner, 1916)
- Neotridactylus obsoletus Günther, 1976
- Neotridactylus occultus Günther, 1976
- Neotridactylus parvilamellatus Günther, 1976
- Neotridactylus pentacuminatus Günther, 1989
- Neotridactylus politus (Bruner, 1916)
- Neotridactylus punctulatus Günther, 1976
- Neotridactylus rentzi Günther, 1976
- Neotridactylus spinosus Günther, 1974
