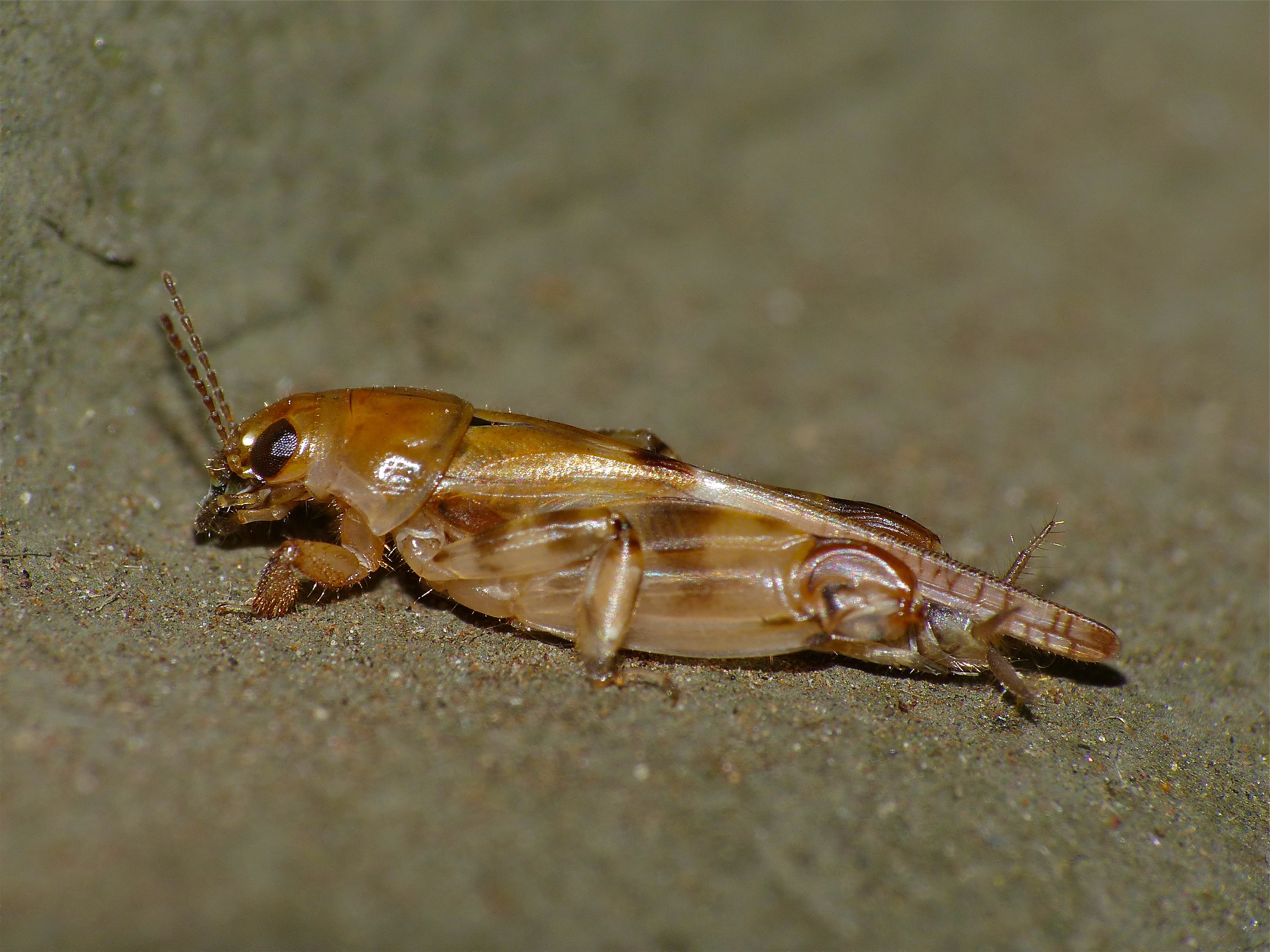
- Tridactylus sp. (Kruger NP, South Africa)

Scientific classification
- Domain: Eukaryota
- Kingdom: Animalia
- Phylum: Arthropoda
- Class: Insecta
- Order: Orthoptera
- Suborder: Caelifera
- Family: Tridactylidae
- Subfamily: Tridactylinae
- Genus: Tridactylus; Olivier, 1789

Synonyms
- Heteropus Palisot de Beauvois, 1805; Trydactylus Salfi, 1935

= Tridactylus =

Genus of Caelifera

Tridactylus is a genus of pygmy mole crickets, with species recorded from Africa, India, Indo-China and Australia.

== Species ==
The Orthoptera Species File lists:

- Tridactylus angustus Günther, 1995
- Tridactylus australicus Mjoberg, 1913
- Tridactylus berlandi Chopard, 1920
- Tridactylus bijakherensis Gupta, Shi & Chandra, 2018
- Tridactylus fossor Fabricius, 1798
- Tridactylus major Scudder, 1869
- Tridactylus paradoxus Latreille, 1802 - type species (locality Dieke, Guinea)
- Tridactylus thoracicus Guérin-Méneville, 1844
- Tridactylus tithonus Blackith & Blackith, 1979

Note: species such as T. capensis and T. peruvianus Chopard, previously placed here, are now in similar genera such as Ellipes and Xya.
