= Sandgroper =

Sandgroper may refer to:

- Sandgroper (insect), a type of burrowing insect found in Western Australia
- Sandgroper, nickname for an inhabitant or native of Western Australia
- The Sandgropers, a nickname for the representative Australian rules football team from Western Australia
- A beachcomber
- A Louisiana (US) tent camper
