= African sandhopper =

Conservation status
- Least Concern (IUCN 3.1)

Scientific classification
- Kingdom: Animalia
- Phylum: Arthropoda
- Class: Insecta
- Order: Orthoptera
- Suborder: Caelifera
- Family: Tridactylidae
- Genus: Afrotridactylus
- Species: A. usambaricus

Binomial name
- Afrotridactylus usambaricus (Sjöstedt, 1910)

Subspecies
- Afrotridactylus usambaricus alter Günther, 1994; Afrotridactylus usambaricus usambaricus (Sjöstedt, 1910)

Synonyms
- Tridactylus usambaricus Sjöstedt, 1910

Species of insect

The African sandhopper (Afrotridactylus usambaricus) is a species of pygmy mole cricket found throughout Africa south of the Sahara Desert. It prefers sandy or muddy open river banks. It has been recorded from Niokolo-Koba National Park in Senegal.
