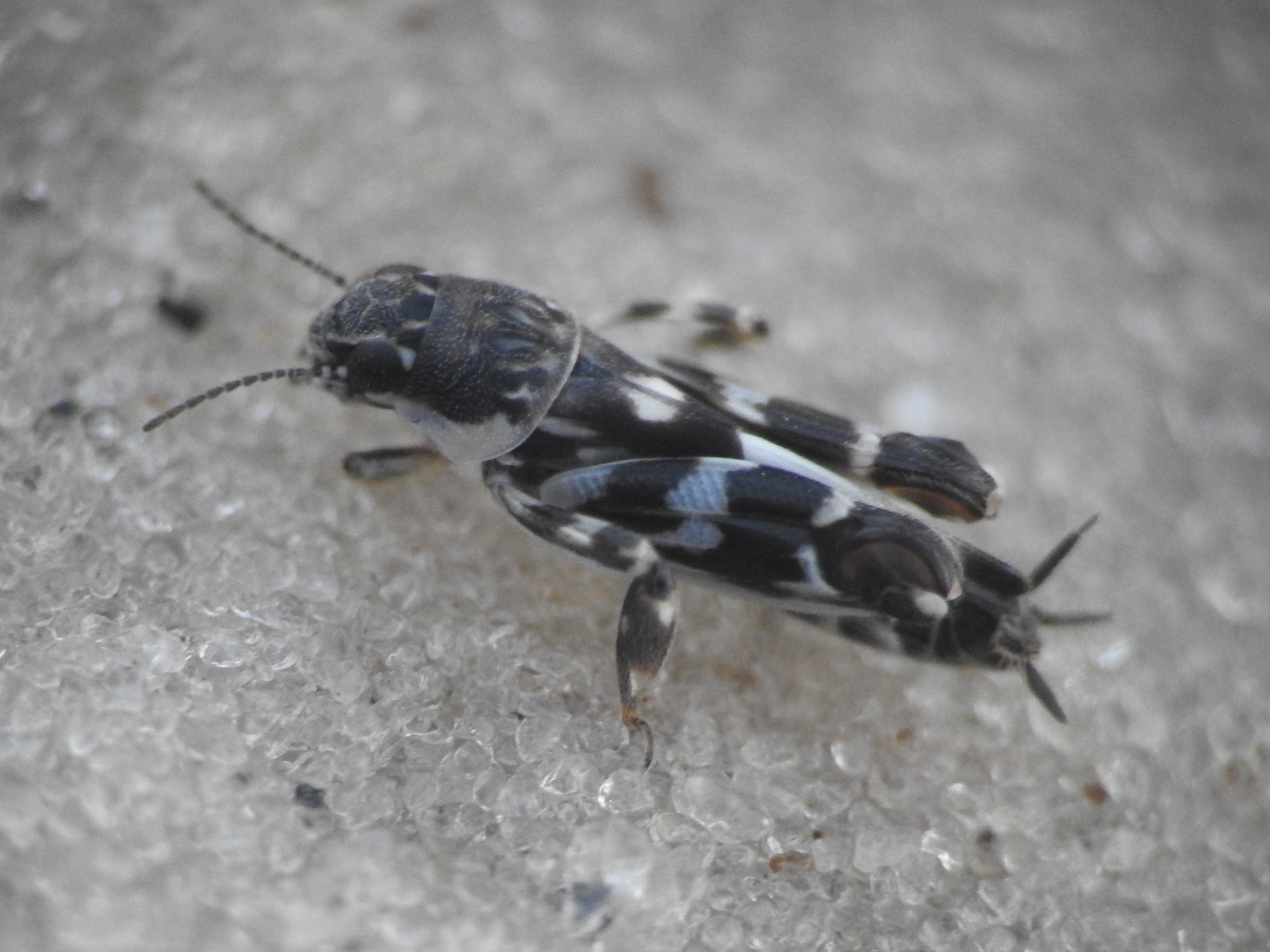

Scientific classification
- Domain: Eukaryota
- Kingdom: Animalia
- Phylum: Arthropoda
- Class: Insecta
- Order: Orthoptera
- Suborder: Caelifera
- Family: Tridactylidae
- Genus: Ellipes
- Species: E. gurneyi

Binomial name
- Ellipes gurneyi Günther, 1977

= Ellipes gurneyi =

Species of insect

Ellipes gurneyi is a species of tiny mole-cricket like insect found in the family Tridactylidae.

== Description and range ==
Ellipes gurneyi is a very small insect (4–5 mm) found in California as well as the southern United States.
