= Afrotridactylus =

Scientific classification
- Domain: Eukaryota
- Kingdom: Animalia
- Phylum: Arthropoda
- Class: Insecta
- Order: Orthoptera
- Suborder: Caelifera
- Family: Tridactylidae
- Subfamily: Tridactylinae
- Genus: Afrotridactylus; Günther, 1994

Genus of Caelifera

Afrotridactylus is a genus of African pygmy mole crickets, which contains the following species:

1. Afrotridactylus ghesquierei Chopard, 1934
2. Afrotridactylus koenigsmanni Günther, 1994
3. Afrotridactylus madecassus (Saussure, 1896) - type species
4. Afrotridactylus meridianus Günther, 1994
5. Afrotridactylus pallidus (Chopard & Callan, 1956)
6. Afrotridactylus spiralatus Günther, 1994
7. Afrotridactylus usambaricus (Sjöstedt, 1910) – African sandhopper
  - Afrotridactylus usambaricus alter Günther, 1994
  - Afrotridactylus usambaricus usambaricus (Sjöstedt, 1910)
