= Regiatidae =

Regiatidae Temporal range: Sinemurian–Toarcian

Scientific classification
- Domain: Eukaryota
- Kingdom: Animalia
- Phylum: Arthropoda
- Class: Insecta
- Order: Orthoptera
- Suborder: Caelifera
- Infraorder: Tridactylidea
- Superfamily: †Dzhajloutshelloidea
- Family: †Regiatidae; Gorochov, 1995

Extinct family of grasshoppers

Regiatidae is an extinct family of grasshoppers in the order Orthoptera. There are at least three genera and four described species in Regiatidae.

== Genera ==
These three genera belong to the family Regiatidae:

- † Micromacula Whalley, 1985 Charmouth Mudstone Formation, United Kingdom, Sinemurian
- † Protochaeta Handlirsch, 1939 Green Series, Germany, Toarcian
- † Regiata Whalley, 1985 Charmouth Mudstone Formation, United Kingdom, Sinemurian
