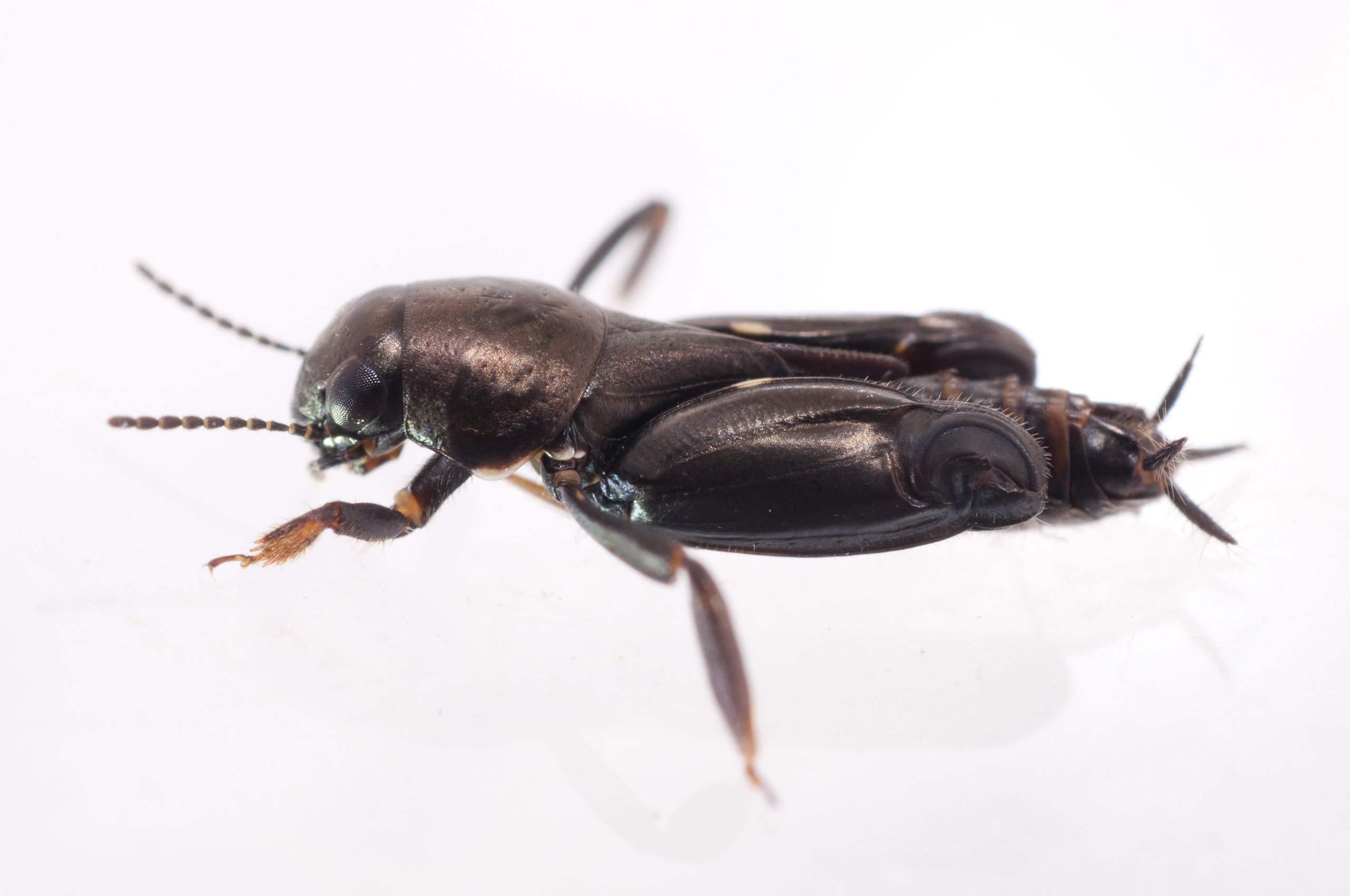
- Xya japonica

Scientific classification
- Kingdom: Animalia
- Phylum: Arthropoda
- Class: Insecta
- Order: Orthoptera
- Suborder: Caelifera
- Family: Tridactylidae
- Subfamily: Tridactylinae
- Genus: Xya; Latreille, 1809

= Xya =

Genus of Caelifera

Xya is a genus of pygmy mole crickets, with species recorded from Africa, southern Europe, Asia and Australia.

== Species ==
The Orthoptera Species File lists:

1. Xya albiantennata Günther, 1995
2. Xya albigenata Günther, 1995
3. Xya albipalpis (Chopard, 1934)
4. Xya ancarafantsika Günther, 1982
5. Xya apicicornis (Chopard, 1928)
6. Xya atra Günther, 1995
7. Xya aurantipes Günther, 1995
8. Xya capensis (Saussure, 1877)
9. Xya castetsi (Bolívar, 1900)
10. Xya crassicornis (Chopard, 1920)
11. Xya curta (Chopard, 1936)
12. Xya descampsi (Harz, 1971)
13. Xya donskoffi (Harz, 1971)
14. Xya elytromaculata Günther, 1995
15. Xya festiva (Chopard, 1968)
16. Xya frontomaculata (Günther, 1974)
17. Xya fujianensis Cao, Chen & Yin, 2020
18. Xya galla (Saussure, 1895)
19. Xya harzi Günther, 1990
20. Xya hauseri (Günther, 1974)
21. Xya hieroglyphica (Bey-Bienko, 1967)
22. Xya huxleyi (Harz, 1971)
23. Xya iberica Günther, 1990
24. Xya indica (Chopard, 1928)
25. Xya inflata Brunner von Wattenwyl, 1893
26. Xya japonica (Haan, 1844)
27. Xya leshanensis Cao, Shi & Hu, 2017
28. Xya leucophrys Sato & Ichikawa, 2020
29. Xya londti Günther, 1982
30. Xya mahakali Ingrisch, 2006
31. Xya manchurei Shiraki, 1936
32. Xya maraisi Günther, 1998
33. Xya marmorata (Chopard, 1928)
34. Xya minor (Chopard, 1920)
35. Xya muta (Tindale, 1928)
36. Xya nanutarrae Baehr, 1988
37. Xya nigraenea (Walker, 1871)
38. Xya nigripennis (Chopard, 1936)
39. Xya nitobei (Shiraki, 1911)
40. Xya nobile Ingrisch, 1987
41. Xya opaca (Walker, 1871)
42. Xya pfaendleri Harz, 1970 (Pfaendler's Molehopper)
43. Xya pronotovirgata Günther, 1995
44. Xya pseudomuta Baehr, 1988
45. Xya pulex (Saussure, 1896)
46. Xya punctata (Bey-Bienko, 1967)
47. Xya quadrimaculata (Chopard, 1936)
48. Xya riparia (Saussure, 1877)
49. Xya royi Günther, 1982
50. Xya schoutedeni (Chopard, 1934)
51. Xya shandongensis Zhang, Yin & Yin, 2018
52. Xya sichuanensis Cao, Shi & Yin, 2018
53. Xya smithersi (Günther, 1978)
54. Xya subantarctica (Willemse, 1954)
55. Xya tumbaensis Günther, 1995
56. Xya uamensis Günther, 1995
57. Xya unicolor Baehr, 1988
58. Xya univenata Günther, 1995
59. Xya variegata (Latreille, 1809)
  type species (as Tridactylus variegatus Latreille) (Colourful Molehopper)
60. Xya vicheti (Harz, 1971)
61. Xya xishangbanna Cao, Rong & Naveed, 2020
62. Xya yunnanensis Cao, Rong & Naveed, 2020
