= Bruntridactylus =

Scientific classification
- Kingdom: Animalia
- Phylum: Arthropoda
- Class: Insecta
- Order: Orthoptera
- Suborder: Caelifera
- Family: Tridactylidae
- Subfamily: Dentridactylinae
- Genus: Bruntridactylus; Günther, 1979

Genus of Caelifera

External image
- Image at iNaturalist

Bruntridactylus is a genus of African and Palaearctic pygmy mole crickets in the subfamily Dentridactylinae, erected by Klaus Günther in 1979. Species have been recorded from: tropical Africa, eastern Europe, central and southern Asia and including Taiwan (this distribution is almost certainly incomplete).

== Species ==
The Orthoptera Species File lists:

1. Bruntridactylus apicedentatus (Chopard, 1934)
2. Bruntridactylus blackithi Günther, 1991
3. Bruntridactylus brunneri (Saussure, 1896) - type species
4. Bruntridactylus centralafricanus Günther, 1991
5. Bruntridactylus formosanus (Shiraki, 1930)
6. Bruntridactylus hannemanni Günther, 1991
7. Bruntridactylus irremipes (Uvarov, 1934)
8. Bruntridactylus katangensis Günther, 1995
9. Bruntridactylus latihamatus Günther, 1991
10. Bruntridactylus mocambicus Günther, 1991
11. Bruntridactylus saussurei (Chopard, 1933)
12. Bruntridactylus tartarus (Saussure, 1874)
