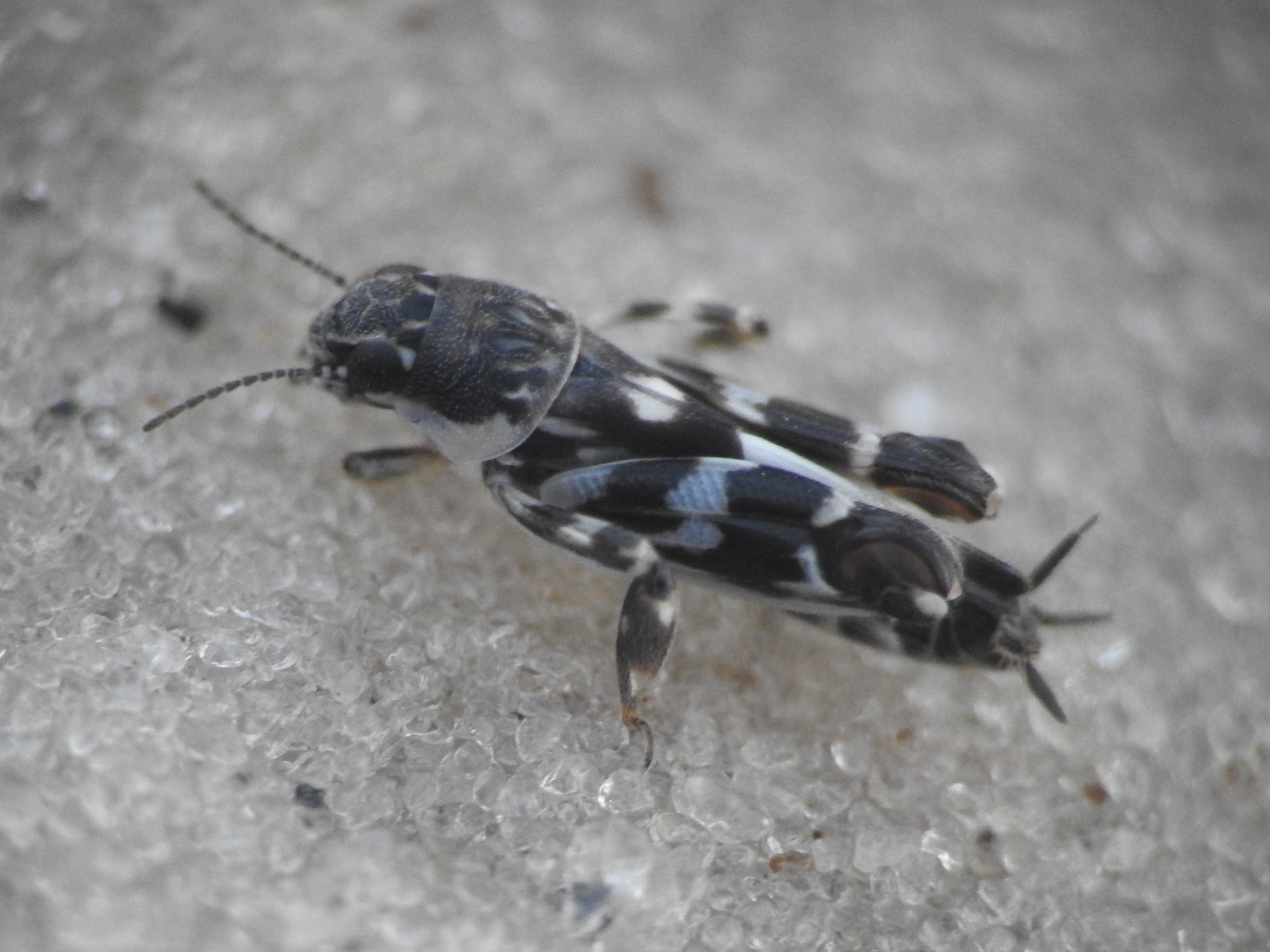
- Ellipes gurneyi, Florida, US

Scientific classification
- Domain: Eukaryota
- Kingdom: Animalia
- Phylum: Arthropoda
- Class: Insecta
- Order: Orthoptera
- Suborder: Caelifera
- Family: Tridactylidae
- Genus: Ellipes; Scudder, 1902

= Ellipes =

Genus of insects

Ellipses is a genus of tiny mole-cricket like insects in the family Tridactylidae.

== Species ==
- Ellipes californicus Günther, 1985 – California and Baja California Norte
- Ellipes deyrupi Woo, 2021 – Florida
- Ellipes eisneri Deyrup, 2005 – Florida
- Ellipes gurneyi Günther, 1977 – southern U.S.
- Ellipes minuta Scudder, 1863 – eastern and central North America.
- Ellipes monticolus Günther, 1977 – southwestern U.S.
