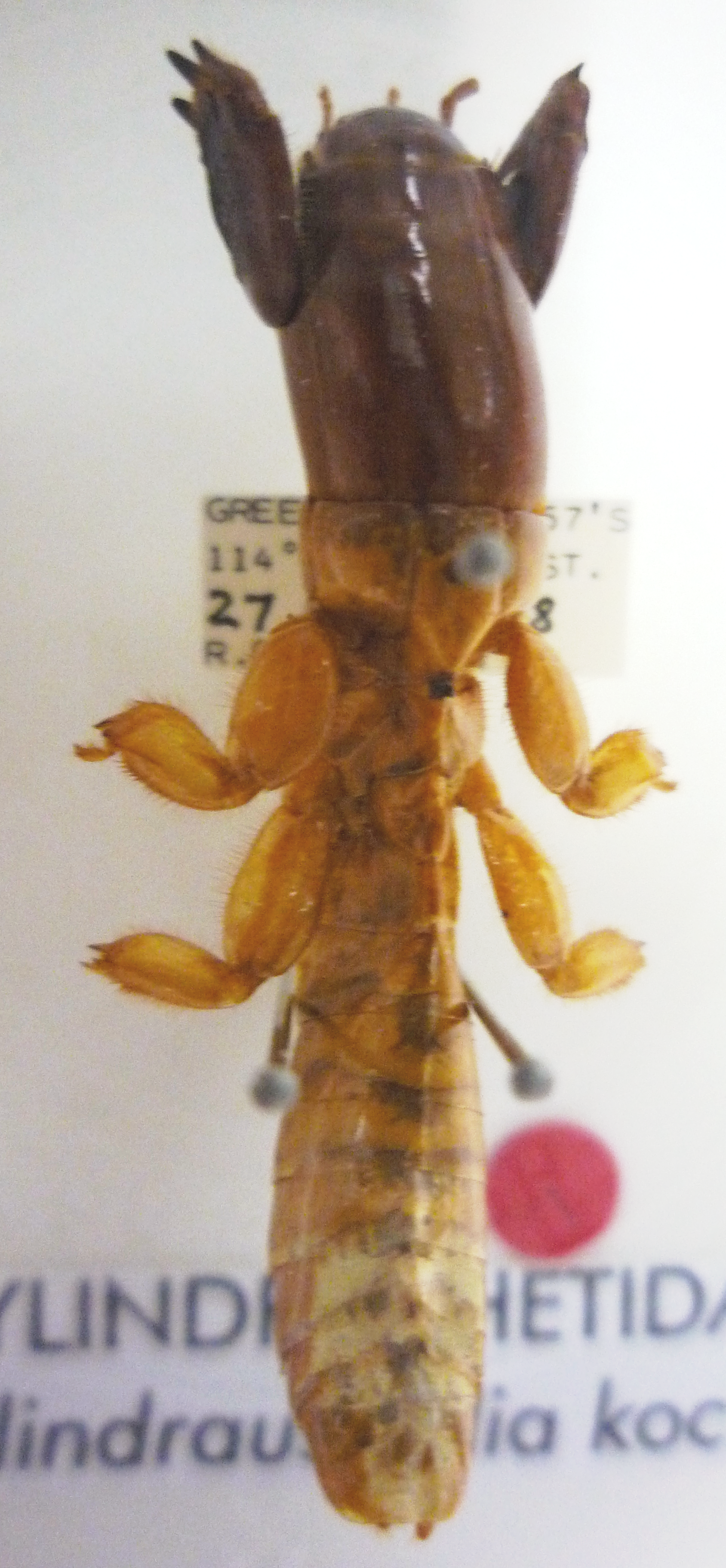
- Cylindraustralia kochii

Scientific classification
- Kingdom: Animalia
- Phylum: Arthropoda
- Clade: Pancrustacea
- Class: Insecta
- Order: Orthoptera
- Suborder: Caelifera
- Superfamily: Tridactyloidea
- Family: Cylindrachetidae (Giglio-Tos, 1914)

Genera
- see text

= Sandgroper (insect) =

Family of Caelifera

Sandgropers are wholly subterranean apterous insects of the family Cylindrachetidae that may grow up to 7 cm (3 in) long. Three genera of these orthopterans are currently recognised: Cylindracheta, Cylindraustralia and Cylindroryctes. Like many subterranean animals, little is known about their habits and diet, but Western Australian farmers have blamed them for substantial crop losses.

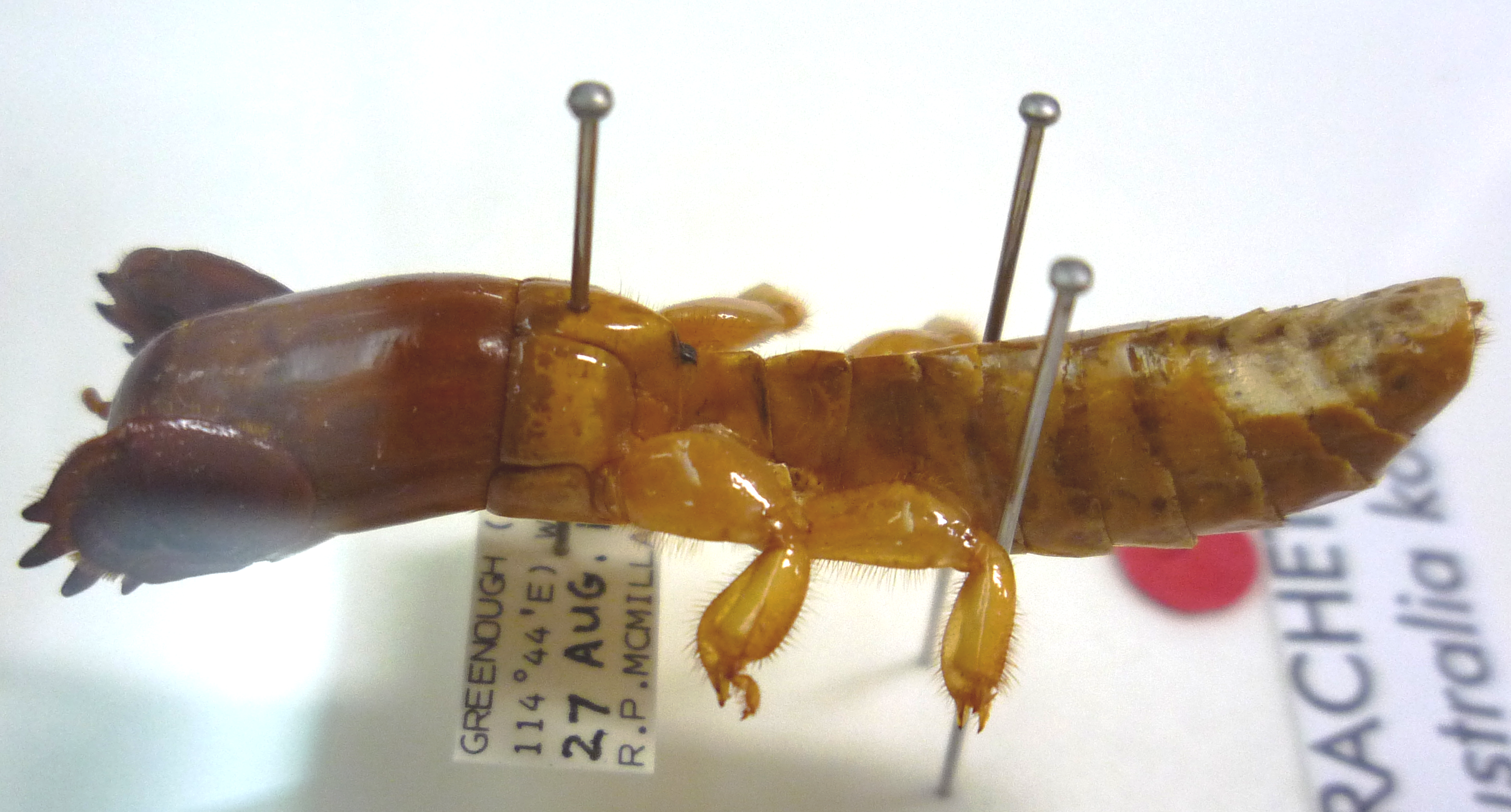

Sandgropers were once thought to be degenerate mole crickets, but they are now known to be more closely related to pygmy mole crickets, in the Caelifera, which includes grasshoppers.

Although widely believed to be herbivorous, some have been found with animal remains in their gut.

== Genera and range ==
- Australia:
  - Cylindracheta Kirby, 1906: monotypic genus found only in the Northern Territory
  - Cylindraustralia Günther, 1992: widely except in the south-east and Tasmania
    at least six species have been recorded in Western Australia of which five are believed to be endemic to that state. C. kochii and C. tindalei are found in the Perth region.
- New Guinea:
  - Cylindraustralia longaeva (Tindale, 1928)
- Argentina:
  - Cylindroryctes Tindale, 1928: monotypic C. spegazzinii (Giglio-Tos, 1914)

== Popular culture ==
In the 1970s, television station TVW Channel 7 in Perth, Western Australia released a stuffed toy sandgroper for sale named "Sunny The Sandgroper", with proceeds going towards Telethon. "Sunny Sandgroper" was then used as a regular character, along with Fat Cat and Percy P Penguin, in TVW-7's Earlybirds morning children's show.

Western Australians have been known colloquially as sandgropers, with references to the name being found as early as the 1890s.
