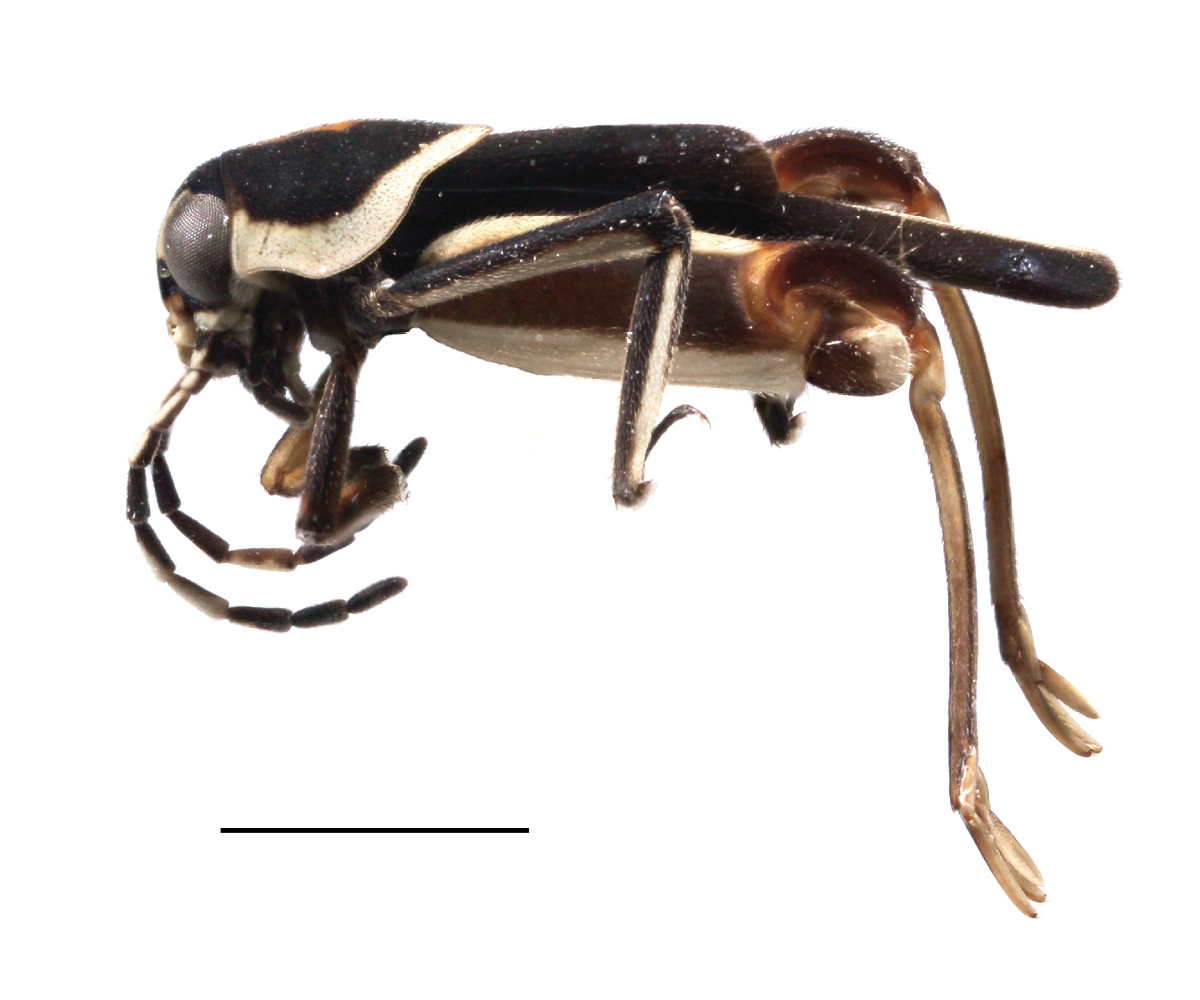
- Ripipteryx mopana

Scientific classification
- Kingdom: Animalia
- Phylum: Arthropoda
- Clade: Pancrustacea
- Class: Insecta
- Order: Orthoptera
- Suborder: Caelifera
- Infraorder: Tridactylidea
- Superfamily: Tridactyloidea; Brullé, 1835

Families
- Cylindrachetidae; Ripipterygidae; Tridactylidae

= Tridactyloidea =

Superfamily of Caelifera

Tridactyloidea is a superfamily in the order Orthoptera. The insects are sometimes known as pygmy mole crickets but they are Caelifera (relatives of grasshoppers) and not members of the mole cricket suborder Ensifera, unlike the true mole crickets, the Gryllotalpidae. It is composed of three families that contain a total of about 50 species. Insects in this superfamily can be 4 to 9 millimeters in length and generally have short antennae and long wings. They live along the banks of bodies of water in tropical areas and are good swimmers and jumpers. Fossils of this subfamily have been found in Siberian deposits dating back to the Cretaceous.

== Families ==
According to the Orthoptera Species File there are three families:

- Cylindrachetidae Giglio-Tos, 1914: "sandgropers" of Australia, Papua New Guinea and South America
- Ripipterygidae Ander, 1939: "mud crickets" of central and South America
- Tridactylidae Brullé, 1835: "pygmy mole crickets" in many (especially tropical) areas.
