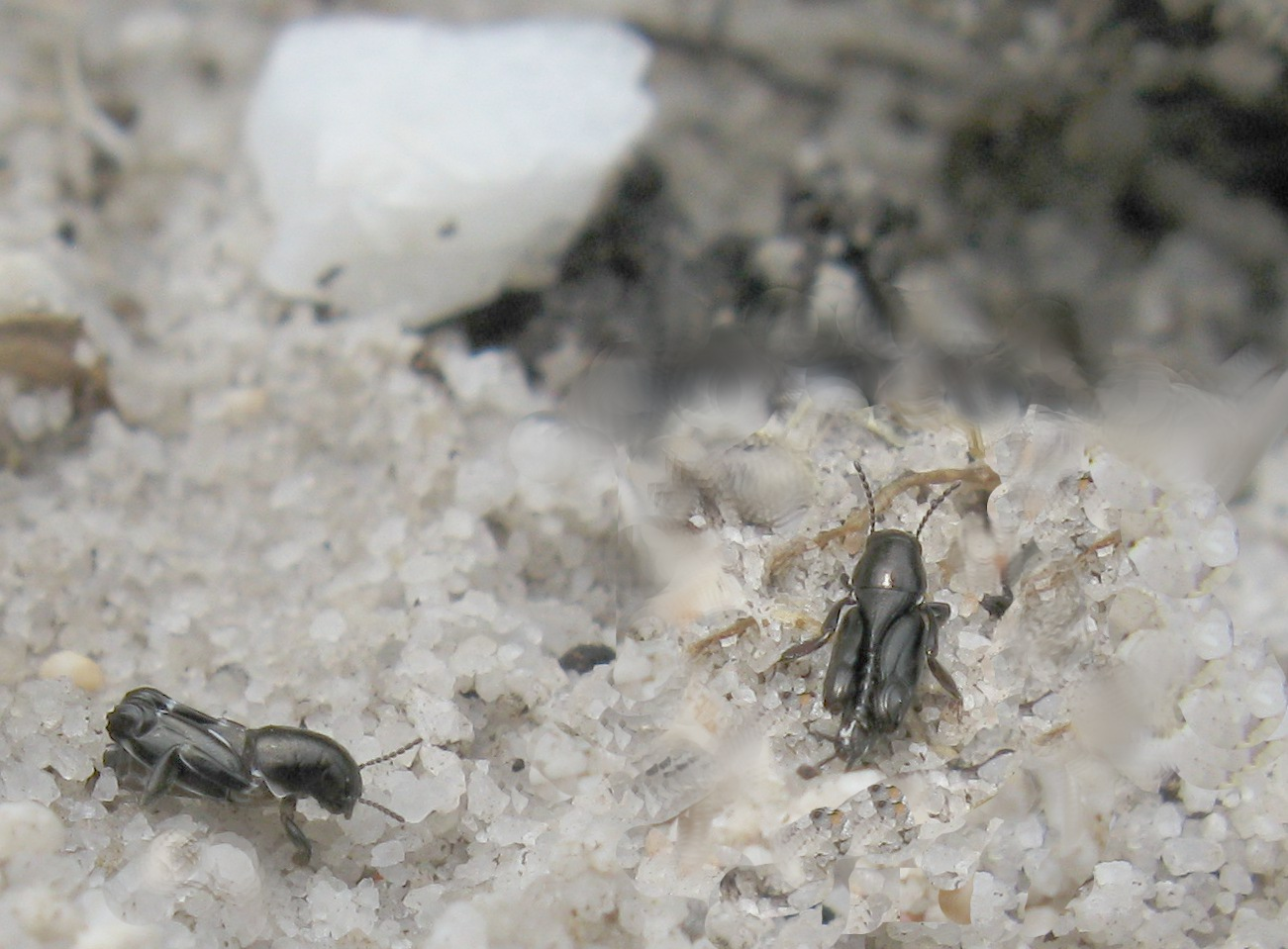
- Tridactylidae on a sandy bank

Scientific classification
- Kingdom: Animalia
- Phylum: Arthropoda
- Clade: Pancrustacea
- Class: Insecta
- Order: Orthoptera
- Suborder: Caelifera
- Infraorder: Tridactylidea
- Superfamily: Tridactyloidea
- Family: Tridactylidae; Brullé, 1835

Subfamilies
- See text

Synonyms
- Tridactyles, Tridactylites Brullé, 1835

= Tridactylidae =

Tridactylidae Temporal range: Berriasian–Recent

Family of insects

The Tridactylidae are a family in the insect order Orthoptera. They are small, mole-cricket-like insects, almost always less than 20 mm (0.79 in) long when mature. Generally they are shiny, dark or black, sometimes variegated or sandy-coloured. They commonly live in short tunnels and are commonly known as pygmy mole crickets, though they are not closely related to the true "mole crickets" (Ensifera), as they are included in the Caelifera suborder (related to grasshoppers).

== Description ==
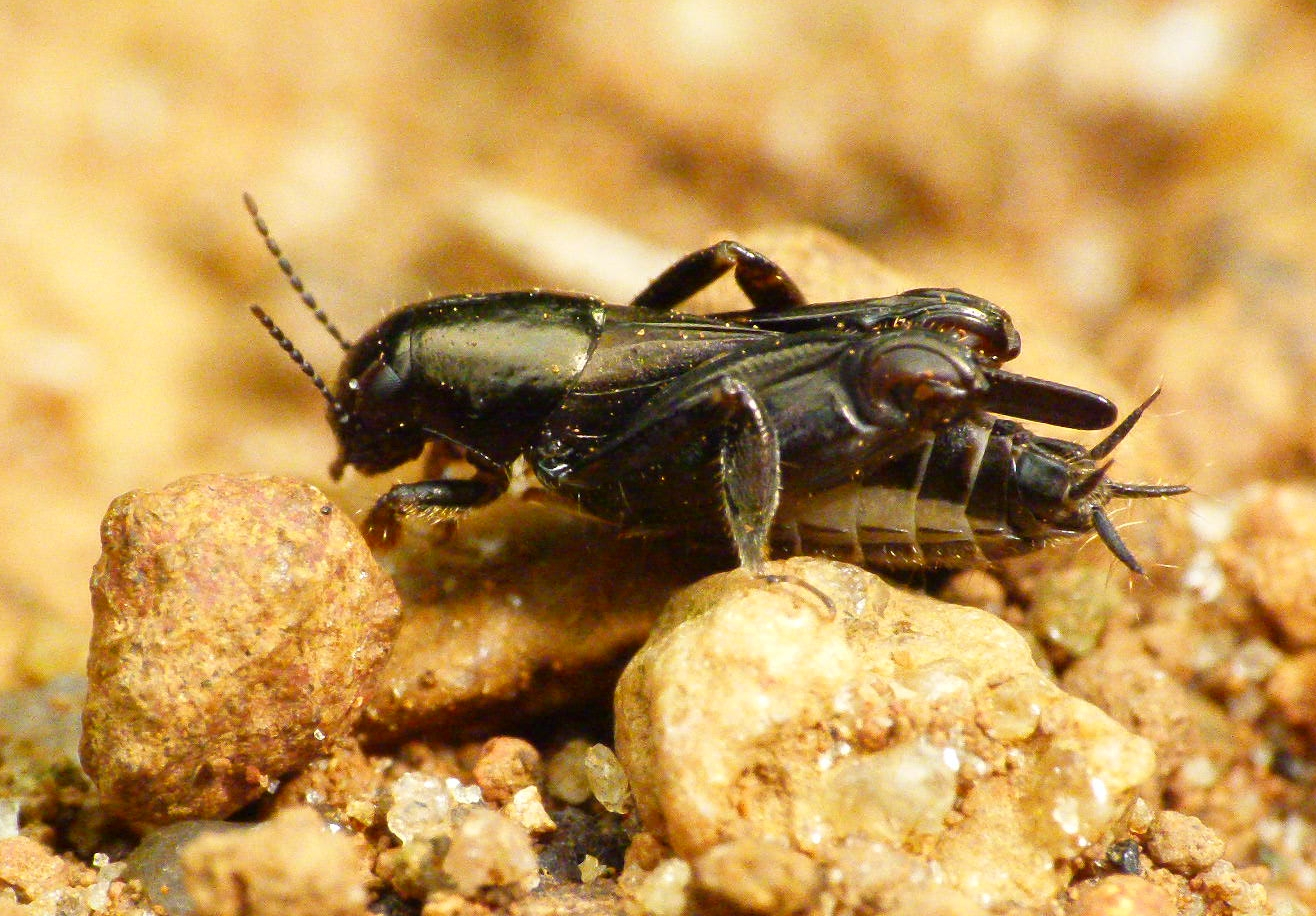
A pygmy mole cricket in profile

The Tridactylidae are small members of the Orthoptera, most species being less than 10 mm in length, though some approach 20 mm. They have a wide, but patchy, distribution on all continents but Antarctica. Being so small and inconspicuously coloured, while living in shallow burrows in moist sandy soil, they are not generally familiar to non-entomologists. They have several unusual features, for example, the posterior femora are greatly enlarged, being strongly adapted for leaping; in some species those hind femora actually are larger than the abdomen. Correspondingly, in support of their powerful jumping capabilities, the hind tibiae bear movable plates towards their distal ends. These vary in number according to the genus, and they are called natatory lamellae (meaning literally "swimming plates"). Ordinarily the insect keeps the plates closely pressed against its tibiae but it can fan them out for swimming, which most species can do very well, some even being able to dive and swim under water. Apart from scrabbling over the water or swimming, some species actually can jump off the water surface. It is probable that the natatory lamellae are what makes such implausible leaps possible. The plates also may aid jumping on land, which Tridactylidae certainly can do impressively.

The posterior tibiae also bear articulated spines near their tips, plus spurs longer than the hind tarsi, which may be entirely absent or else are at best vestigial, having only a single segment. The insect uses its hind tibial spurs for digging, which is unusual for an insect's hind leg. The anterior four tarsi, in contrast to the posterior two tarsi, generally have two segments each.

The tegmina are reduced in size, rather as in the Tetrigidae, but there is no corresponding extension of the pronotum. The vestigial tegmina are horny, almost without veins, and without stridulating organs. In keeping with the lack of stridulatory adaptations, the fore tibiae do not bear tympanal organs such as those found in many Orthoptera. Rear wings generally are present, often longer than the abdomen, but their presence in any particular species need not imply that the insect is capable of flight.

Tridactylidae give the impression of having two pairs of cerci; this is because, in addition to the true cerci, the two podical plates (comprising the divided sternum of the eleventh abdominal segment) are greatly elongated and each bears a terminal segment that looks like a stylus or cercus. The antennae are fairly short, typically filiform or moniliform, with eleven segments.

Some species have vestigial ovipositors, whereas others have ovipositors similar to those of the Acrididae, suited to depositing the eggs in sandy soil.

== Taxonomy ==
Historically Tridactylidae affinities have been the occasion for confusion. Originally they were seen as a subfamily, Tridactylinae, of the Gryllidae, the true crickets, closely related to the Gryllotalpidae or Gryllotalpinae, but their placement has long been accepted as a parallel or convergent evolution with the 'true' mole crickets.

Detailed study of genitalia however, subsequently led to the suggestion that they were nearer to the Acrididae, the grasshoppers. They eventually were assigned to their own family, Tridactylidae which, together with the Cylindrachetidae, form the superfamily Tridactyloidea (Rentz 1996). The family Tridactylidae in turn were split into two families, the Tridactylidae and the Ripipterygidae, or "mud crickets" (Günther 1994; Flook et al. 1999).

As of 2020, Orthoptera Species File lists two extant (living) subfamilies and one extinct.

=== Dentridactylinae ===
Auth. Günther, 1979

1. Bruntridactylus Günther, 1979
2. Dentridactylus Günther, 1974
3. Paratridactylus Ebner, 1943
- †Burmadactylus Heads, 2009 Burmese amber, Myanmar, Cenomanian
- †Cascogryllus Poinar, 2018 Burmese amber, Myanmar, Cenomanian
- †Guntheridactylus Azar & Nel, 2008 Oise amber, France, Ypresian
- †Magnidactylus Xu et al. 2020 Burmese amber, Myanmar, Cenomanian

=== Tridactylinae ===
Auth. Brullé, 1835

- Afrotridactylus Günther, 1994
- Asiotridactylus Günther, 1995 - Africa to central Asia
- Ellipes Scudder, 1902 - Americas
- Neotridactylus Günther, 1972 - Americas
- Tridactylus Olivier, 1789
- Xya Latreille, 1809
- †Archaeoellipes Heads, 2010 Dominican amber, Miocene
- †Cratodactylus Martins-Neto, 1990 Crato Formation, Brazil, Aptian

=== Extinct genera ===
- subfamily †Mongoloxyinae Gorochov, 1992
  - †Baisoxya Gorochov & Maehr, 2008 Zaza Formation, Russia, Aptian
  - †Birmitoxya Gorochov, 2010 Burmese amber, Myanmar, Cenomanian
  - †Cretoxya Gorochov, Jarzembowski & Coram, 2006 Lulworth Formation, United Kingdom, Berriasian
  - †Mongoloxya Gorochov, 1992 Dzun-Bain Formation, Mongolia, Aptian
  - †Monodactyloides Sharov, 1968 Zaza Formation, Russia, Aptian
- incertae sedis
  - †Paraxya Cao, Chen & Yin, 2019 Burmese amber, Myanmar, Cenomanian
  - †Magnidactylus Xu, Fang & Jarzembowski, 2020 Burmese amber, Myanmar, Cenomanian

== Biology ==
Tridactylidae (maybe Xya sp.) at a dam in the United Arab Emirates)

The typical habitat of Tridactylidae is moist, sandy soil near water, such as dams, lakes, streams, and sometimes the sea. In such places they dig small tunnels, in which they live, sometimes together with other inoffensive neighbours such as sundry beetles. They seem to feed largely on organic detritus, plant material, and in particular, algae, including microscopic algae coating sand grains; they accordingly emerge mainly to feed on moist soil in the light, which permits the growth of the algae on which they depend for food.

In some species breeding takes place in their tunnels, eggs being laid in batches of a few dozen. Other species with well-developed ovipositors lay eggs singly in moist soil, but at least some of those species have since been assigned to the family Ripipterygidae, also within the superfamily Tridactyloidea. There is not much available information on such details of their biology.
