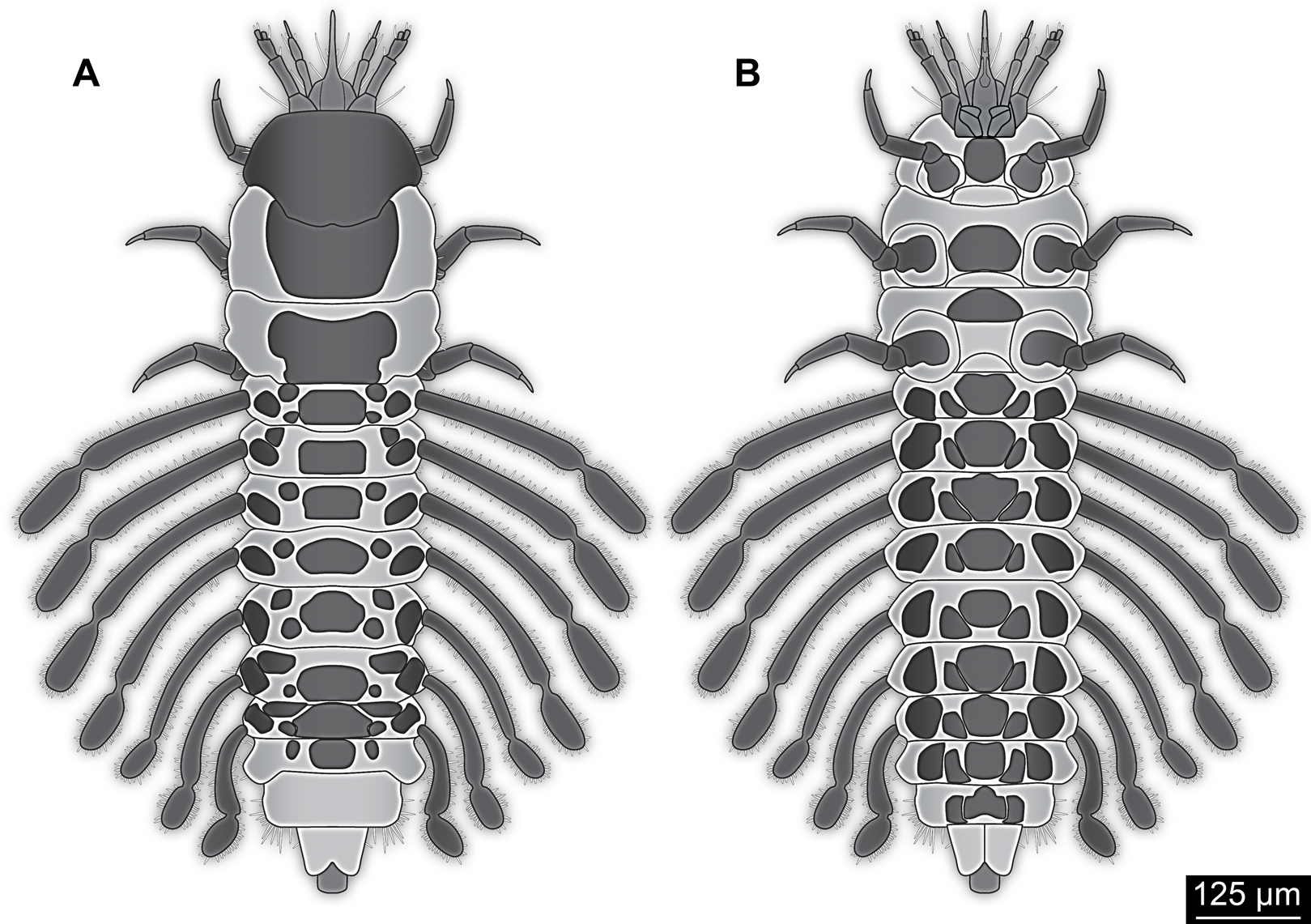
- Diagrammatic reconstruction of Partisaniferus atrickmuelleri

Scientific classification
- Kingdom: Animalia
- Phylum: Arthropoda
- Clade: Pancrustacea
- Class: Insecta
- Order: Coleoptera
- Suborder: Polyphaga
- Infraorder: Elateriformia
- Superfamily: Elateroidea
- Genus: †Partisaniferus; Haug et al, 2020

Type species
- Partisaniferus atrickmuelleri Haug et al, 2020

Species
- Partisaniferus atrickmuelleri Haug et al, 2020; ?Partisaniferus edjarzembowskii Haug & Haug, 2022

= Partisaniferus =

Partisaniferus Temporal range: 99 Ma

Extinct genus of enigmatic insect

Partisaniferus, also referred to as the "beak larva" for its unusual mouthparts, is an enigmatic insect genus known from mid-Cretaceous Burmese amber. It contains two species, the type species P. atrickmuelleri and possibly the species P. edjarzembowskii. It is known from several specimens, one of P. atrickmuelleri and three at different larval stages for P. edjarzembowskii. It had short legs, a broad abdomen and several small sclerites covering each segment, with the type species also bearing long spiny processes from each abdominal segment. While Partisaniferus resembles various different holometabolan larvae, the closest matches in appearance (beetle and lacewing larvae) belong to the clade Neuropteriformia, hence this genus is placed within the clade too as an enigmatic member. It likely lived within wood, possibly sucking on fungi, in a fire-prone, coastal tropical rainforest environment. A 2026 paper re-examined the mouthparts of Partisaniferus and found it to likely be within the beetle clade Elateroidea, specifically related to Jurasaidae and Cerophytidae.

The generic name derives from the shape of some medieval blades, linked to both partisans and the beak shape of the larva. The type species' name honours Patrick Müeller, who provided the type specimen. While at first the "p" seems to be missing, this letter is restored with the abbreviated generic name giving P. atrickmuelleri. Meanwhile, P. edjarzembowskii honours Edmund Jarzembowski for his work on fossil insects, and also spells out "PED (palaeo-evo-devo) jarzembowskii" with the abbreviated generic name, which further honours his contributions.

== Description ==
=== Partisaniferus atrickmuelleri ===
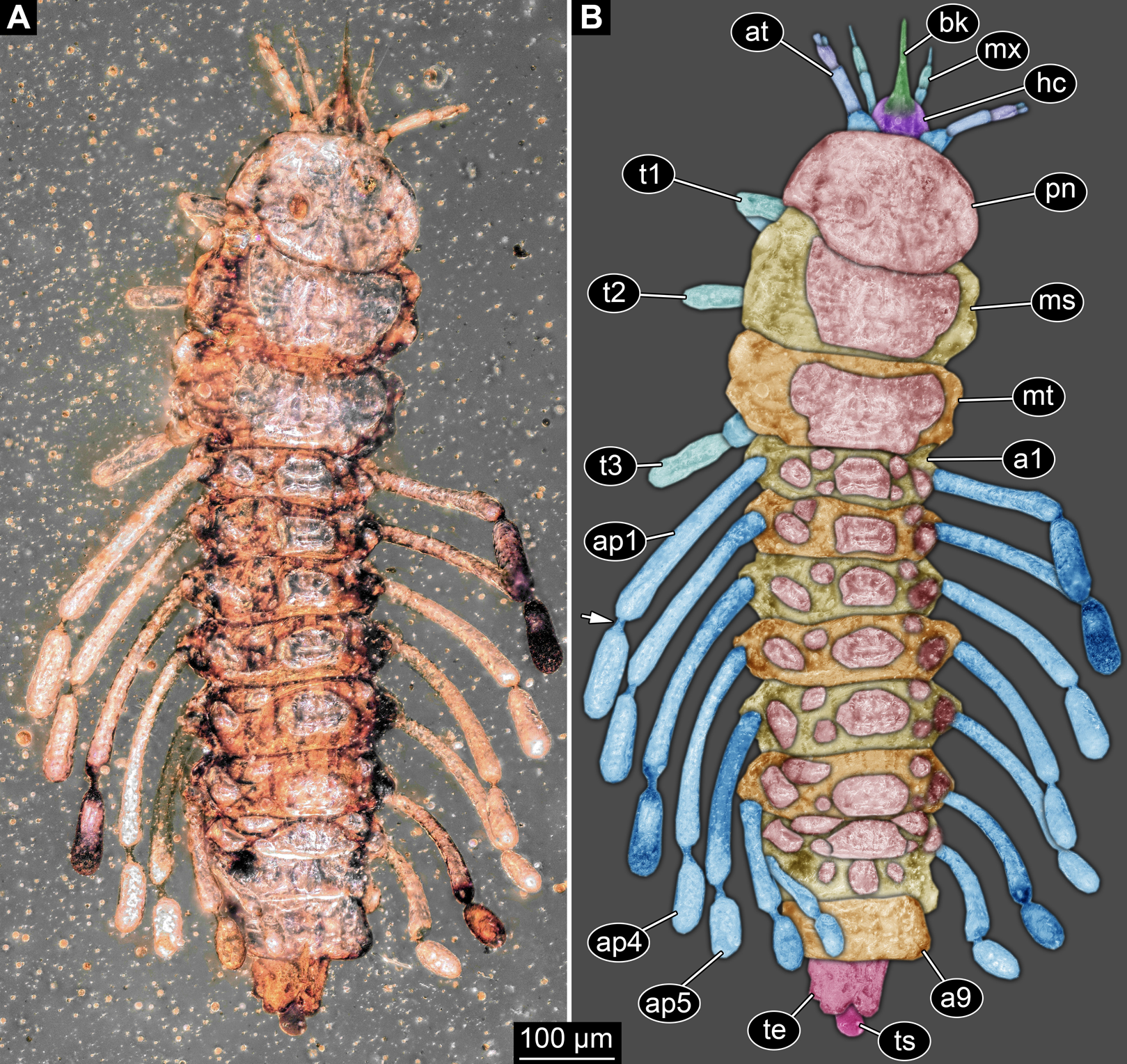
Dorsal view of P. atrickmuelleri's type specimen

Partisaniferus's head capsule is obscured by other structures, so only the forward part is visible. This forward part is roughly triangular in shape and lacks eyes, suggesting the capsule may have been partially retracted into the head. The antennae are borne on the first post-ocular (eye) segment, and are composed of four segments with each decreasing in size. The third segment also bears a sensilla, which resembles segment four in shape but is much smaller. The second post-ocular segment lacks appendages, but the third to fifth bear the mouthparts. These mouthparts form a beak-like structure, with the dorsal side likely comprising the labrum. The other mouthparts are likely visible on the ventral side, with the mandibles being very faint lines on the "beak". A further posterior appendage (likely the maxilla) is composed of five separate segments, with the first being longer than the rest. The last three segments form a palp/endopod which is about as long as the antennae. A long bifurcated structure in the beak may represent the endites of either the maxilla or labium. The remaining mouthparts (likely the labium) poke out from between the maxillary palps, consisting of a conjoined pair of appendages. These appendages have a rectangular base, with long structures (possibly the palp bases) being visible in fluorescence on the underside of the beak. Each thorax segment is sclerotised, forming tergites and sternites. The first segment is around twice as wide as the head, with a rounded tergite widest at the posterior. The sternite is also rounded, being circular and around the same width as the body. The limbs are relatively long, with the first segment being as long as the sternite. The tarsus (foot) is spine-like and curves inwards, being more slender than the previous segment. The second and third segments are similar, however their tergite does not cover the entire dorsal surface, instead leaving a membranous area at the edges. Alongside this, their tergites narrow more towards the posterior instead of the anterior, and the appendages are slightly longer.

==== Abdomen ====
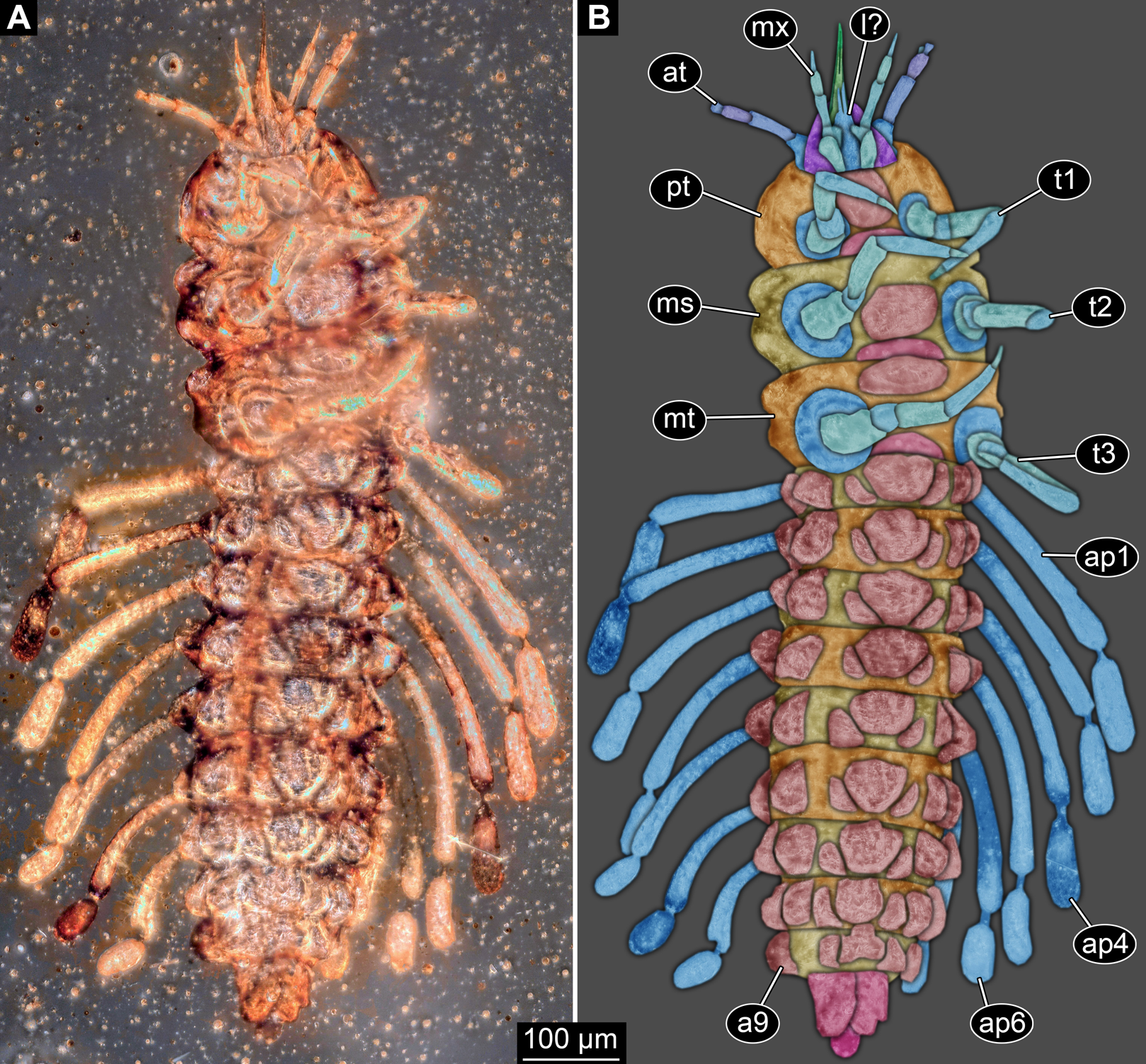
Ventral view of P. atrickmuelleri's type specimen

The abdomen is composed of eleven segments, with the first six being relatively similar to each other. The first abdominal segment is considerably smaller than the last thorax segment, and separated by a distinct fold. It bears seven sclerites on the top half, with one large rectangular one in the centre (about 30% as wide as the entire segment), four smaller squarish ones and two more rounded sclerites near the sides. The ventral region is similar, but its sclerites are different in shape with the central one being more trapezoidal, and its side sclerites being crescent-shaped. The abdomen also bears unusual processes (projections) from its sides, about as wide as the legs. These processes curve gently posterior, and are covered in many setae (hairs), with a distinct constriction around three-fifths of the way along their length. The next five segments are similar to the first, although they alongside their processes become smaller towards the posterior. The eighth segment lacks a process entirely, and only has three sclerites on its top (although the ventral arrangement is still complete). The ninth segment is narrow but long, with setose (hairy) and bulging corners with a resemblance to the abdominal processes. The trunk end (possibly consisting of the last two abdominal segments) is cone-shaped and has a sharp notch down its middle, giving it a lobed appearance, and bears a small terminal structure at its tip.

=== ?Partisaniferus edjarzembowskii ===
?P. edjarzembowskii diagrammatic reconstruction

Partisaniferus edjarzembowskii resembles the type species in most ways, including the characteristic beak. However, it lacks the elongated hairy processes which P. atrickmuelleri has, alongside only having one large tergite per segment instead of multiple smaller sclerites. Furthermore, its tail end is trapezoidal in shape, as opposed to the type's lobed end. While the type specimen is of similar size to P. atrickmuelleri, a second much larger specimen is assigned to the species. This specimen likely was further in development by at least three moults compared to the type, as their size differs by a factor of around eight times.

An even later larval specimen shows marked physogastry (enlargement of the abdomen), with the fact that the holotype of the specimens do not show this feature being explainable by ontogeny (as they are much smaller and so likely at an earlier moult than the physogastric specimen). The latest larval specimen may instead be a larviform female, but the fact that jurasaid females do not retain their larval beaks makes this theory unlikely.

== Classification ==
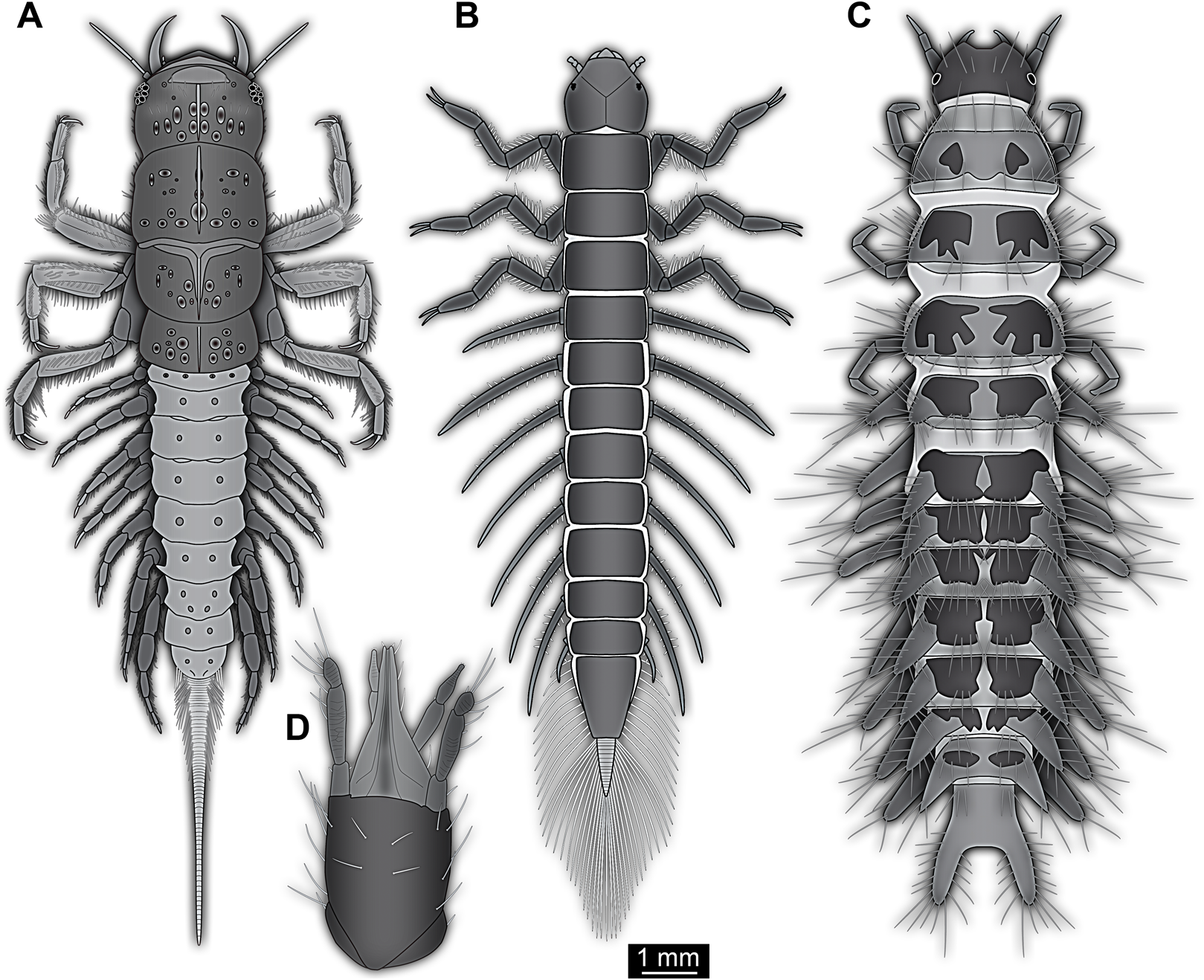
Other insect larvae similar to Partisaniferus in appearance, middle is a fossil megalopteran

The most remarkable feature of Partisaniferus is the beak. One of the few insects with a similar structure is the beetle Glyptolopus quadricostatus, a member of the family Cerylonidae. Both of these taxa have elongate beak-like mouths with a forked structure near their tip, and as the beetle's beak is composed of the labium, it is likely that Partisaniferus's was too. The two elongate structures inside the beak may be parts of the labial palps, with their arrangement suggesting they helped stabilise the beak like in modern hemipterans.

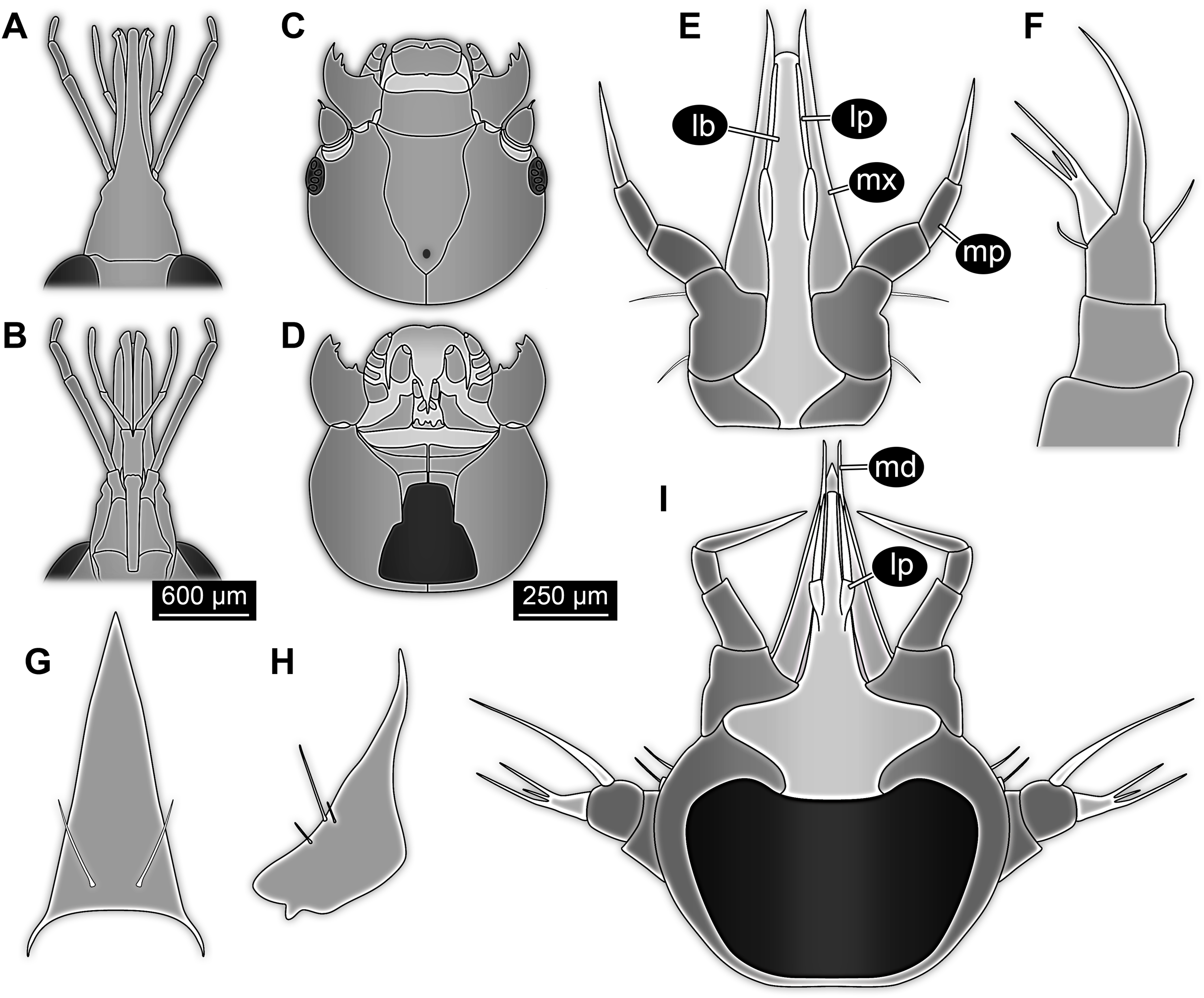
Insects with mouthparts similar to those of Partisaniferus

While the mouthparts are prognathous (facing forward), this occurs in multiple holometabolan groups, so this does not narrow placement down very much. While piercing-sucking mouthparts are common in Neuroptera, these form two separate tubes, and even when they resemble a single element such as in mantisflies they are much wider than the beak of the fossil. Some beetles also resemble this condition, yet their mandibles are unmodified as opposed to those of the fossil. Scorpionfly adults show a beak-like structure too, yet their larvae instead have "regular" chewing mouthparts. The cerylonid beetles once more are the closest match in mouthpart structure, yet their mouthparts face downwards instead of forwards.

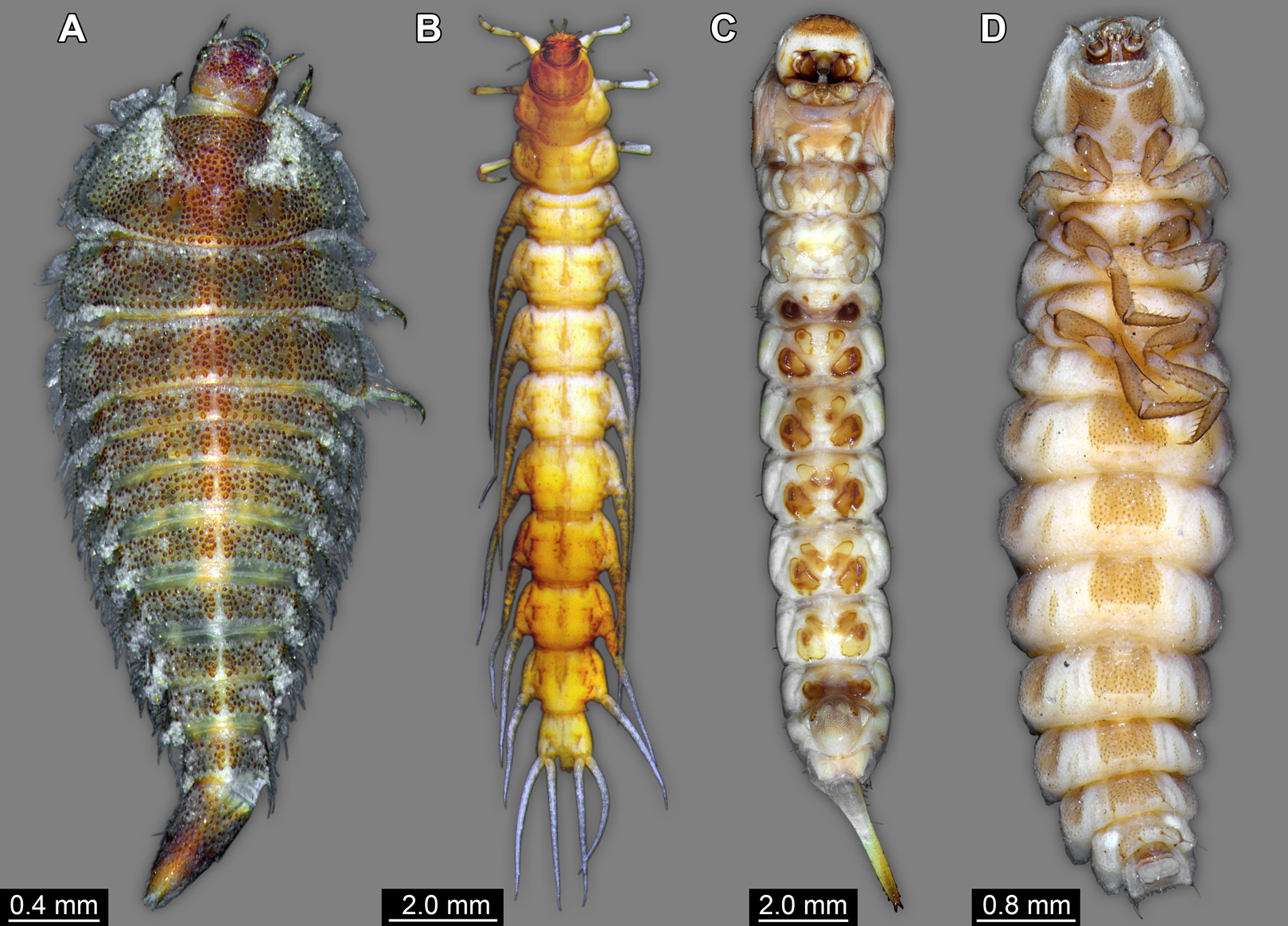
Extant beetle larvae similar to Partisaniferus

The antennae consist of four segments, with a long second segment but the others being more robust. It shares four segments and a sensorium with megalopteran larvae, however in these the sensorium is on the second segment. Beetle larvae are closer to the arrangement found in the fossil, however members of Polyphaga often only have three antennal segments, and many beetle larvae have quite short antennae.

The following cladogram shows potential placements of Partisaniferus within the Holometabola as suggested by Haug et al.(2020):

- Aparaglossata
  - Neuropteroidea
    - Neuropterida
      - Raphidioptera (snakeflies)
      - - Megaloptera (alderflies and allies)
        - Neuroptera (Lacewings and allies)
      - ?Partisaniferus
    - Coleopterida
      - Coleoptera (beetles)
      - Strepsiptera (twisted-wing parasites)
      - ?Partisaniferus
    - ?Partisaniferus
  - Panorpida

The thoracic structure of an extended rim and multiple sclerites resembles larvae of multiple different groups such as beetles and scorpionflies, and so this is not very helpful in determining exact classification. The striking abdominal processes resemble the gills of Megaloptera, alongside various processes of lepidopteran caterpillars or beetle larvae, however all three have tapering processes instead of the straighter ones of Partisaniferus. Extinct taxa do not help either, as extinct lacewing larvae's processes are all more dorsal, and they were used to carry debris (which there is no evidence of in this fossil). The processes of miomopteran larvae are jointed, and so they do not match either. The terminal end resembles those of sialids, however in those it tapers distally unlike that of Partisaniferus. Beetle larvae have either paired processes or a featureless terminal end, so both the processes and this are unique.

In its original description, the larva was unable to be placed within any modern insect order due to its unusual characteristics. An affinity with "Apterygota" is definitely false, as it lacks cerci unlike the vast majority of apterygotes or a furca similar to a springtail, and bears well-developed antennae unlike the proturans. The short antennae, incomplete sclerotisation and short legs together suggested this larva was a member of Holometabola, however further placement became unclear. The closest matches to the larva exist within Neuroptera and Coleoptera, suggesting a placement in the wider Neuropteriformia.

In a 2026 paper, the mouthpart structure of Partisaniferus was re-examined, finding the main beak to be composed of the labium and labrum with the mandibles situated to the side. This rules out a neuropteran placement, as neuropteran larvae have connected mandibles and maxillae, alongside a different labium placement. The mouthpart structure and presence of 5 tarsal segments shows Partisaniferus is likely in Polyphaga and especially resembling the poorly known elateroid family Jurasaidae. While the beak structure does heavily resemble that of jurasaids, Partisaniferus still exhibits several differences such as mouthparts which are not integrated into the head capsule. This genus also resembles the family Cerophytidae, although further differences suggest it is likely closer to Jurasaidae. Although Partisaniferus may turn out to be conspecific with an already-known (although unnamed) specimen likely within Cerophytidae, proving this relationship would require finding a male and larviform female mating, or larval exuvia with a pupa alongside a pupa with a pharate (newly-emerged) adult.

== Palaeobiology ==
Head of Siphonophora barberi from Central America, which shares several similarities in mouthpart structure to Partisaniferus

Partisaniferus's stylet-like mouthparts show it was a piercing-sucking feeder, although this does not tell whether it was raptorial or sucking on plants/fungi. All modern beetles with similar mouthparts seem to be fungivorous, which suggests the fossil may have had a similar diet. While modern cerylonid beetle larvae also live under bark (which would explain the fossil's contact with tree resin), the long processes of Partisaniferus are at odds with this. The original paper suggested it may not even have been terrestrial, as its long processes resemble the gills of aquatic larvae. While an aquatic animal being preserved in amber may seem highly unlikely, other aquatic larvae such as those of megalopterans have also been preserved in amber. Therefore its exact lifestyle was deemed uncertain, with the adult lifestyle being even more uncertain as holometabolans change drastically from larvae to adults.

However, a 2023 paper describing a new specimen of P. edjarzembowskii found similarities in the beak to siphonophorid millipedes, which seem to be fluid feeders (while the exact diet of siphonophorid millipedes is unknown, feeding on fungus or rotten wood is most likely). This, combined with the physogastry (swollen abdomen) of the new specimen (a feature associated with living in confined spaces) suggests it likely dwelled within wood, either preying on wood-borers or sucking on fungi. The 2026 paper reclassifying the genus further supports this hypothesis, as it also holds true for its closest relatives.

== Palaeoecology ==
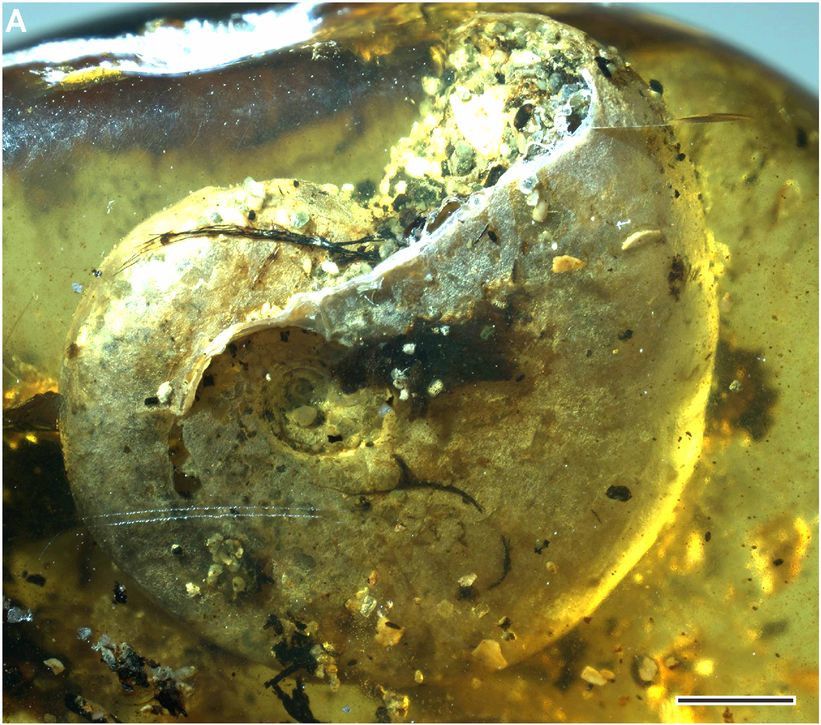
A Puzosia (Bhimaites) shell in Burmese amber, showing a near-marine environment of origin

Partisaniferus is only found in Burmese amber, which houses a rich diversity of fauna, including some of the first fossils of palpigrades (Electrokoenenia), velvet worms (Cretoperipatus), ricinuleids and schizomids. Furthermore, the amber also preserves unusual transitional forms such as Chimerarachne and Aristovia. Various marine animals encased in the amber suggest it was a coastal environment with the final deposition being a marine environment. Alongside this, freshwater prawns and bivalves also suggest the amber entered the water through an estuary and/or river. The locality where Burmese amber originated from was likely a tropical rainforest at the time of deposition, with the existence of fire-adapted flowers showing the environment was likely as prone to fires as tropical peat swamps are. Burmese amber itself also seems to come from a conifer based on spectroscopic analysis, although which type of conifer exactly is uncertain.
