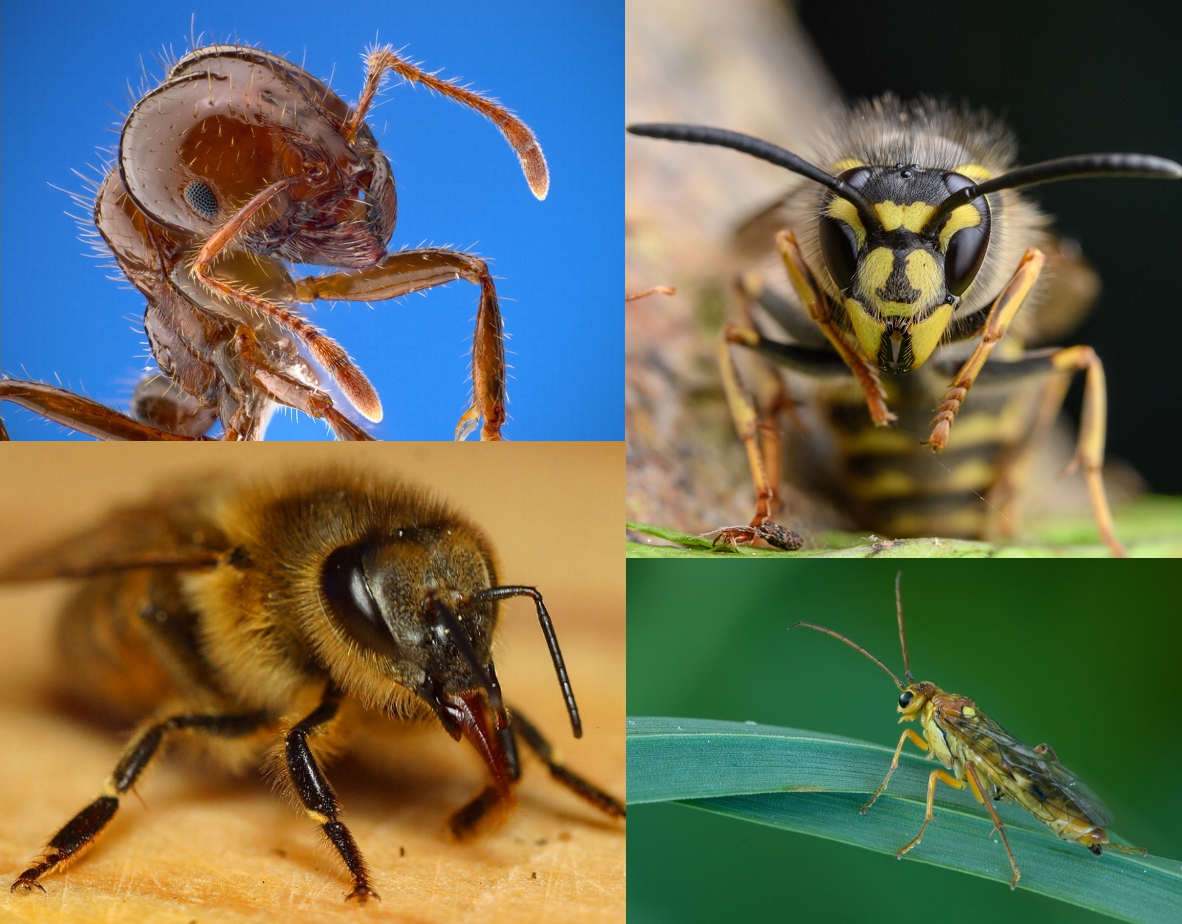
- Hymenopterans from different families; Clockwise from top-left: Red imported fire ant (Formicidae), Vespula vulgaris (Vespidae), Tenthredopsis sordida (Tenthredinidae), and Western honey bee (Apidae)

Scientific classification
- Kingdom: Animalia
- Phylum: Arthropoda
- Clade: Pancrustacea
- Class: Insecta
- Clade: Holometabola
- Superorder: Hymenopterida
- Order: Hymenoptera; Linnaeus, 1758

Suborders
- Symphyta (sawflies) (paraphyletic); Cratoenigma; Xiphydrioidea; Orussoidea; Orussidae; Apocrita (wasps, bees and ants)

= Hymenoptera =

Hymenoptera Temporal range: Triassic–present 235–0 Ma

Order of insects

Hymenoptera is a large order of insects, comprising the sawflies, wasps, bees, and ants. Over 150,000 living species of Hymenoptera have been described, in addition to over 2,000 extinct ones. Many of the species are parasitic. Females typically have a special ovipositor for inserting eggs into hosts or places that are otherwise inaccessible. This ovipositor is often modified into a stinger. The young develop through holometabolism (complete metamorphosis)—that is, they have a wormlike larval stage and an inactive pupal stage before they reach adulthood.

== Etymology ==
The name Hymenoptera comes from Ancient Greek ὑμήν (humḗn) 'membrane' and πτερόν (pterón) 'wing'.

== Evolution ==
Molecular analysis finds that Hymenoptera is the earliest branching group of Holometabola.

Hymenoptera originated in the Triassic, with the oldest fossils belonging to the family Xyelidae. Social hymenopterans appeared during the Cretaceous. The evolution of this group has been intensively studied by Alex Rasnitsyn, Michael S. Engel, and others.

- Holometabola
  - Hymenopterida
    Hymenoptera (sawflies, wasps)
  - Aparaglossata
    - Neuropteroidea
      - Coleopterida
        - Coleoptera (beetles)
        - Strepsiptera (twisted-wing parasites)
      - Neuropterida
        - Raphidioptera (snakeflies)
        - - Megaloptera (alderflies and allies)
          - Neuroptera (Lacewings and allies)
    - Panorpida
      - Amphiesmenoptera
        - Lepidoptera (butterflies, moths)
        - Trichoptera (caddisflies)
      - Antliophora
        - Diptera
        - - Mecoptera (scorpionflies)
          - Siphonaptera (fleas)

Phylogenetic relationships within the Hymenoptera, based on both morphology and molecular data, have been intensively studied since 2000. In 2023, a molecular study based on the analysis of ultra-conserved elements confirmed many previous findings and produced a relatively robust phylogeny of the whole Order, although the relationships among the Symphyta lineages are still a source of active research. Basal superfamilies are shown in the cladogram below.

Hymenoptera

- Hymenoptera 250mya
  - Tenthredinoidea
  - - Xyeloidea (Triassic–present)
    - - Pamphilioidea
      - Unicalcarida
        - - Siricoidea (horntails or wood wasps)
          - Xiphydrioidea (wood wasps)
        - - Cephoidea (stem sawflies)
          - parasitism
            - Orussoidea (parasitic wood wasps)
            - "wasp waist" 200mya
              Apocrita (ants, bees, wasps)

Symphyta (red bar) are paraphyletic as Apocrita are excluded.

== Anatomy ==
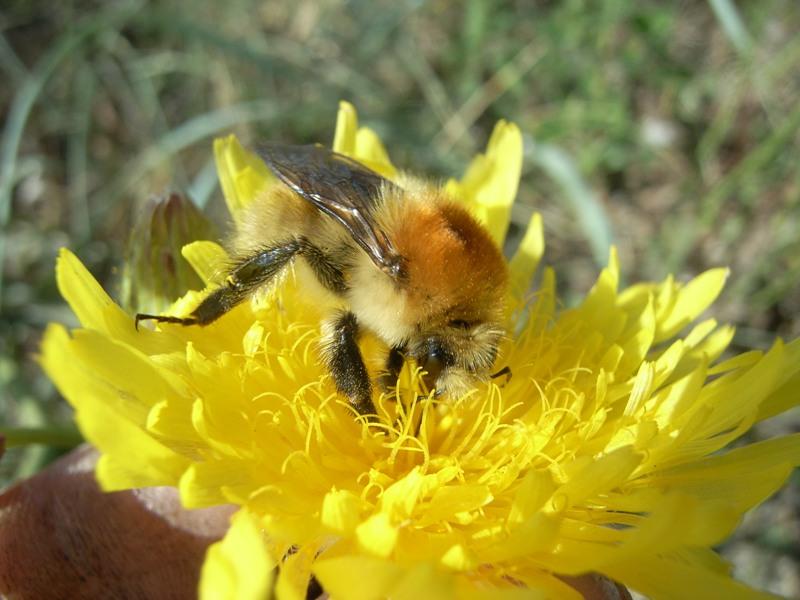
Bombus muscorum drinking nectar with its long proboscis

Hymenopterans range in size from very small to large insects. Their mouthparts are adapted for chewing, with well-developed mandibles (ectognathous mouthparts). Many species have further developed the mouthparts into a lengthy proboscis, with which they can drink liquids, such as nectar. Hymenopterans usually have two pairs of wings, but some solitary wasps and worker ants don't. They typically have large compound eyes with three simple eyes, ocelli.

The forward margin of the hind wing bears a number of hooked bristles, or "hamuli", which lock onto the fore wing, keeping them held together (hamuli wing coupling). The smaller species may have only two or three hamuli on each side, but the largest wasps may have a considerable number, keeping the wings gripped together especially tightly. Hymenopteran wings have relatively few veins compared with many other insects, especially in the smaller species.

In the more ancestral hymenopterans, the ovipositor is blade-like, and has evolved for slicing plant tissues. In the majority, however, it is modified for piercing, and, in some cases, is several times the length of the body. In some species, the ovipositor has become modified as a stinger, and the eggs are laid from the base of the structure, rather than from the tip, which is used only to inject venom. The sting is typically used to immobilize prey, but in some wasps and bees may be used in defense.

Hymenopteran larvae typically have a distinct head region, three thoracic segments, and usually nine or 10 abdominal segments. In the suborder Symphyta, the eruciform larvae resemble caterpillars in appearance, and like them, typically feed on leaves. They have large chewing mandibles, three pairs of thoracic limbs, and, in most cases, six or eight abdominal prolegs. Unlike caterpillars, however, the prolegs have no grasping spines, and the antennae are reduced to mere stubs. Symphytan larvae that are wood borers or stem borers have no abdominal legs and the thoracic legs are smaller than those of non-borers.

With rare exceptions, larvae of the suborder Apocrita have no legs and are maggotlike in form, and are adapted to life in a protected environment. This may be the body of a host organism, or a cell in a nest, where the adults will care for the larva. In parasitic forms, the head is often greatly reduced and partially withdrawn into the prothorax (anterior part of the thorax). Sense organs appear to be poorly developed, with no ocelli, very small or absent antennae, and toothlike, sicklelike, or spinelike mandibles. They are also unable to defecate until they reach adulthood due to having an incomplete digestive tract (a blind sac), presumably to avoid contaminating their environment. The larvae of stinging forms (Aculeata) generally have 10 pairs of spiracles, or breathing pores, whereas parasitic forms usually have nine pairs present.

== Reproduction ==
=== Sex determination ===
Among most or all hymenopterans, sex is determined by the number of chromosomes an individual possesses. Fertilized eggs get two sets of chromosomes (one from each parent's respective gametes) and develop into diploid females, while unfertilized eggs only contain one set (from the mother) and develop into haploid males. The act of fertilization is under the voluntary control of the egg-laying female, giving her control of the sex of her offspring. This phenomenon is called haplodiploidy.

However, the actual genetic mechanisms of haplodiploid sex determination may be more complex than simple chromosome number. In many Hymenoptera, sex is determined by a single gene locus with many alleles. In these species, haploids are male and diploids heterozygous at the sex locus are female, but occasionally a diploid will be homozygous at the sex locus and develop as a male, instead. This is especially likely to occur in an individual whose parents were siblings or other close relatives. Diploid males are known to be produced by inbreeding in many ant, bee, and wasp species. Diploid biparental males are usually sterile but a few species that have fertile diploid males are known.

One consequence of haplodiploidy is that females on average have more genes in common with their sisters than they do with their daughters. Because of this, cooperation among kindred females may be unusually advantageous and has been hypothesized to contribute to the multiple origins of eusociality within this order. In many colonies of bees, ants, and wasps, worker females will remove eggs laid by other workers due to increased relatedness to direct siblings, a phenomenon known as worker policing.

Another consequence is that hymenopterans may be more resistant to the deleterious effects of inbreeding. As males are haploid, any recessive genes will automatically be expressed, exposing them to natural selection. Thus, the genetic load of deleterious genes is purged relatively quickly.

=== Thelytoky ===
Some hymenopterans take advantage of parthenogenesis, the creation of embryos without fertilization. Thelytoky is a particular form of parthenogenesis in which female embryos are created (without fertilisation). The form of thelytoky in hymenopterans is a kind of automixis in which two haploid products (proto-eggs) from the same meiosis fuse to form a diploid zygote. This process tends to maintain heterozygosity in the passage of the genome from mother to daughter. It is found in several ant species including the desert ant Cataglyphis cursor, the clonal raider ant Cerapachys biroi, the predaceous ant Platythyrea punctata, and the electric ant (little fire ant) Wasmannia auropunctata. It also occurs in the Cape honey bee Apis mellifera capensis.

Oocytes that undergo automixis with central fusion often have a reduced rate of crossover recombination, which helps to maintain heterozygosity and avoid inbreeding depression. Species that display central fusion with reduced recombination include the ants Platythyrea punctata and Wasmannia auropunctata and the Cape honey bee Apis mellifera capensis. In A. m. capensis, the recombination rate during meiosis is reduced more than tenfold. In W. auropunctata the reduction is 45 fold.

Single queen colonies of the narrow headed ant Formica exsecta illustrate the possible deleterious effects of increased homozygosity. Colonies of this species which have more homozygous queens will age more rapidly, resulting in reduced colony survival.

== Diet ==
Different species of Hymenoptera show a wide range of feeding habits. The most primitive forms are typically phytophagous, feeding on flowers, pollen, foliage, or stems. Stinging wasps are predators, and will provision their larvae with immobilized prey, while bees feed on nectar and pollen.

A huge number of species are parasitoids as larvae. The adults inject the eggs into a host, which they begin to consume after hatching. For example, the eggs of the endangered Papilio homerus are parasitized at a rate of 77%, mainly by Hymenoptera species. Some species are even hyperparasitoid, with the host itself being another parasitoid insect. Habits intermediate between those of the herbivorous and parasitoid forms are shown in some hymenopterans, which inhabit the galls or nests of other insects, stealing their food, and eventually killing and eating the occupant.

== Classification ==
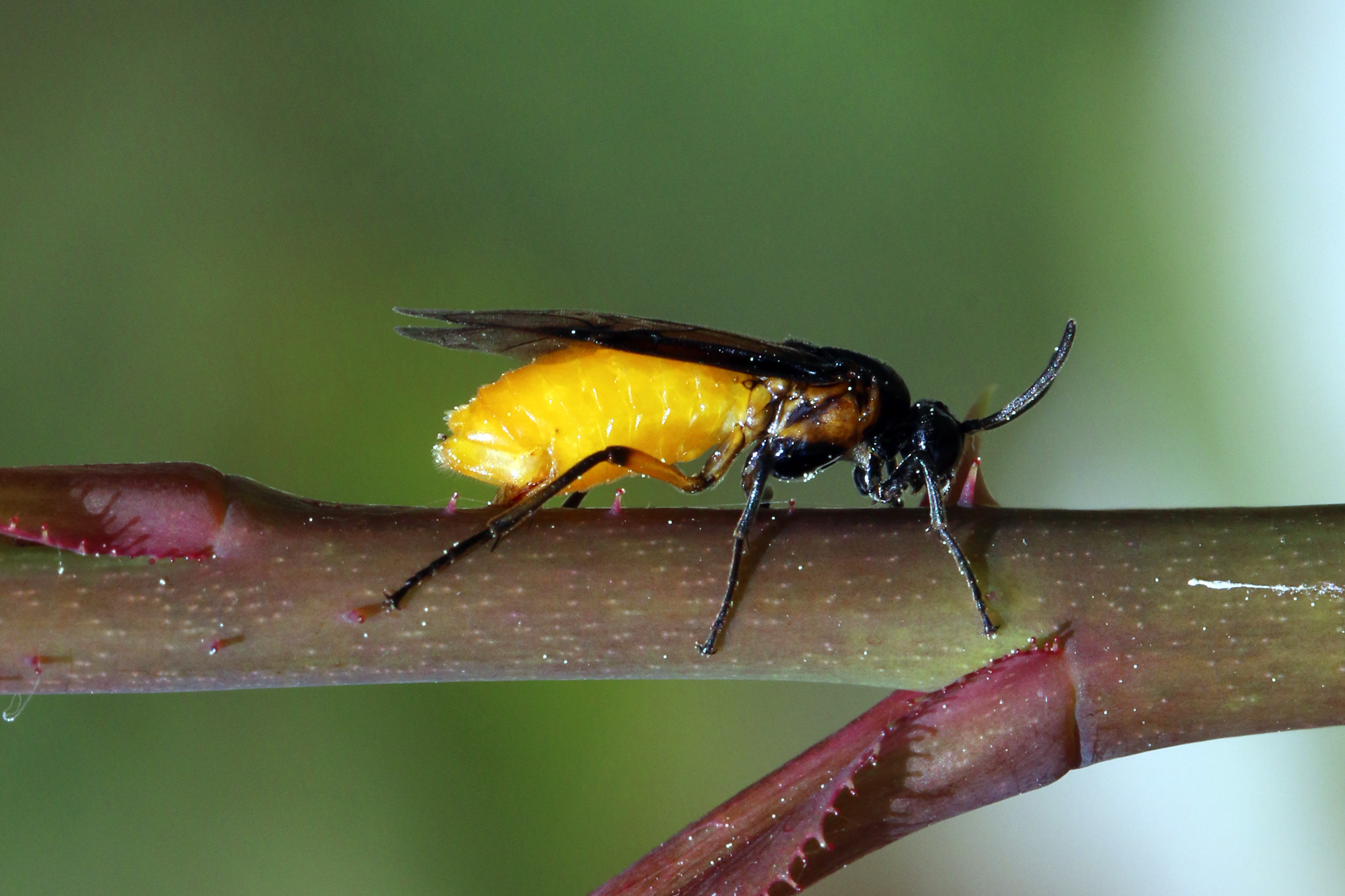
Symphyta, without a waist: the sawfly Arge pagana

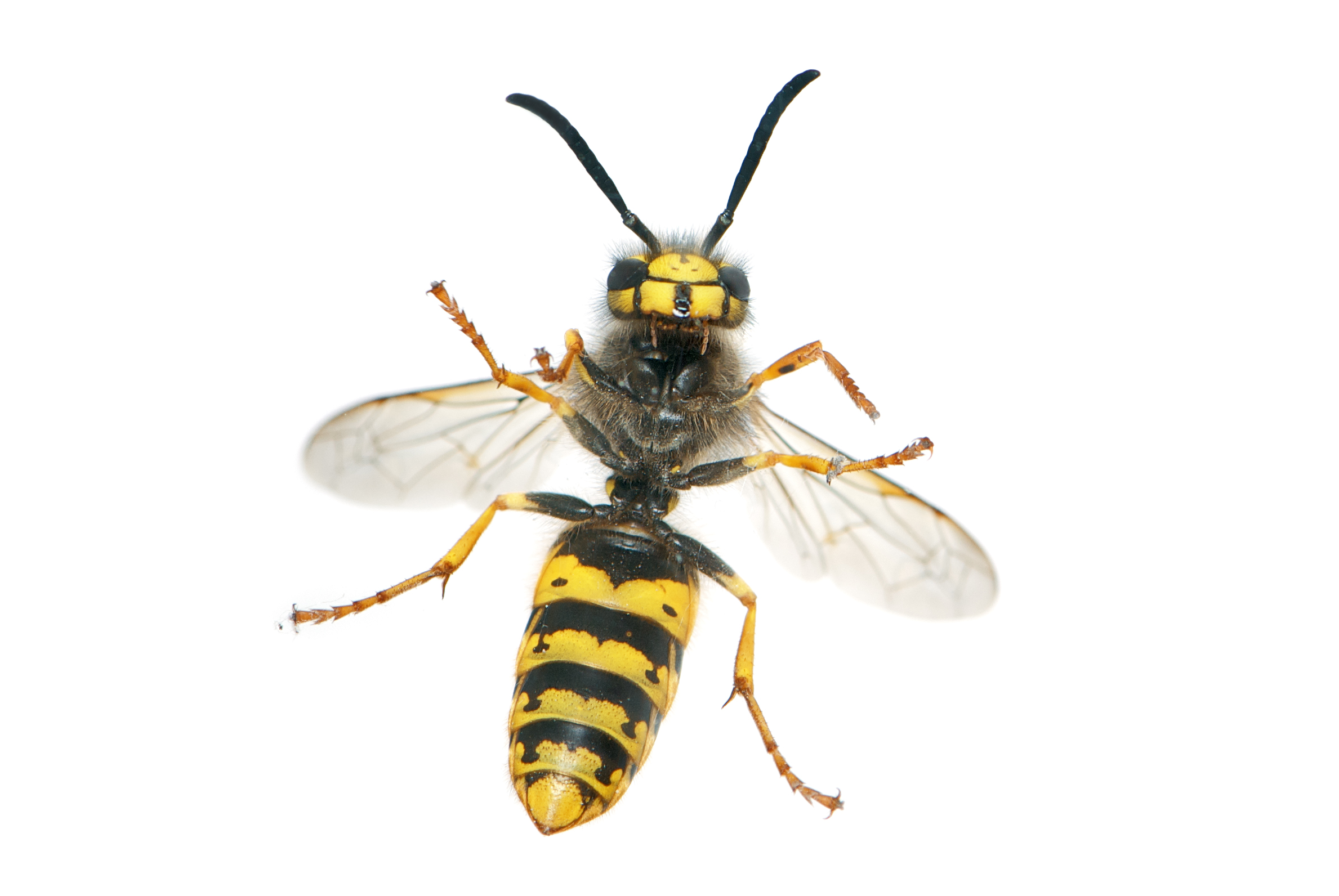
Apocrita, with narrow waist: the wasp Vespula germanica

The Hymenoptera are divided into two groups; the Symphyta which have no waist, and the Apocrita which have a narrow waist.

=== Symphyta ===
The suborder Symphyta includes the sawflies, horntails, and parasitic wood wasps. The group is paraphyletic, as it has been suggested that the family Orussidae may be the group from which the Apocrita arose. They have an unconstricted junction between the thorax and abdomen. The larvae are herbivorous, free-living, and eruciform, usually with three pairs of true legs, prolegs (on every segment, unlike Lepidoptera) and ocelli. The prolegs do not have crochet hooks at the ends unlike the larvae of the Lepidoptera. The legs and prolegs tend to be reduced or absent in larvae that mine or bore plant tissue, as well as in larvae of Pamphiliidae.

=== Apocrita ===
The wasps, bees, and ants together make up the suborder (and clade) Apocrita, characterized by a constriction between the first and second abdominal segments called a wasp-waist (petiole), also involving the fusion of the first abdominal segment to the thorax. Also, the larvae of all Apocrita lack legs, prolegs, or ocelli. The hindgut of the larvae also remains closed during development, with feces being stored inside the body, with the exception of some bee larvae where the larval anus has reappeared through developmental reversion. In general, the anus only opens at the completion of larval growth.

== Threats ==
Hymenoptera as a group are highly susceptible to habitat loss, which can lead to substantial decreases in species richness and have major ecological implications due to their pivotal role as plant pollinators.

== See also ==
- Hymenoptera Genome Database
- Insects in literature (ant, bee, wasp)
- Worker policing
