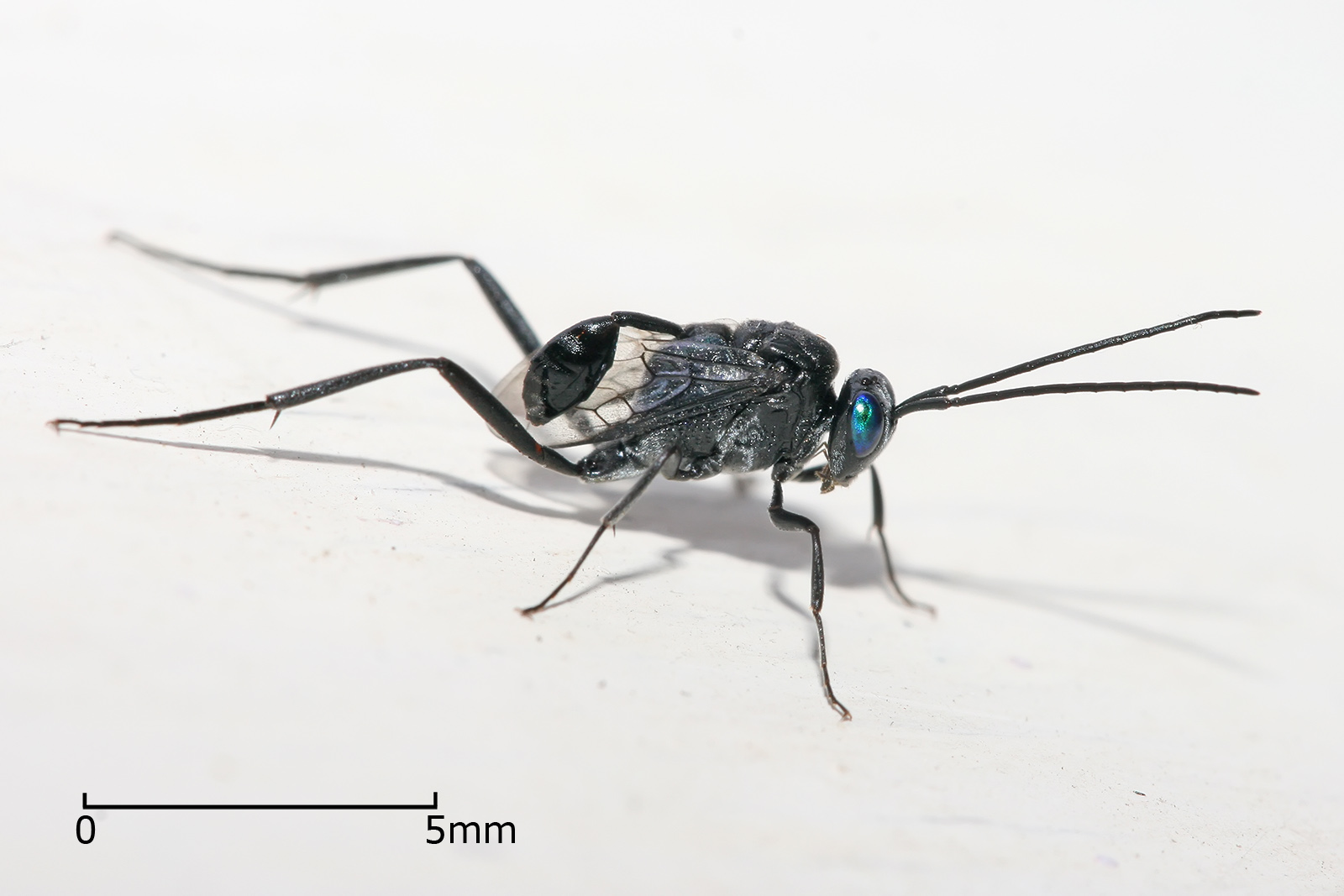
- Blue-eyed ensign wasp (Evania appendigaster)

Scientific classification
- Kingdom: Animalia
- Phylum: Arthropoda
- Clade: Pancrustacea
- Class: Insecta
- Clade: Eumetabola
- Clade: Holometabola
- Superorder: Hymenopterida; Boudreaux (1979)

Subgroups
- † Avioxyela; Hymenoptera

= Hymenopterida =

Hymenopterida Temporal range: Triassic–present

Superorder of insects

Hymenopterida is a superorder of holometabolous (metamorphosing) insects. As originally circumscribed, it included Hymenoptera and the orders in Panorpida (Mecoptera, Siphonaptera, Diptera, Trichoptera and Lepidoptera). However, more recent studies find Hymenoptera as sister to the other members of Holometabola and the superorder is restricted to Hymenoptera.

== Evolution ==
The following phylogenetic tree shows the internal relationships of the superorder as a clade of Hymenoptera but more recent molecular analyses find a different arrangement within Holometabola, with Hymenoptera as the earliest branching group.

- Holometabola
  - Hymenopterida
    Hymenoptera (sawflies, wasps, bees, ants)
  - Aparaglossata
    - Neuropteroidea
      - Neuropterida
        - Raphidioptera (snakeflies)
        - - Megaloptera (alderflies and allies)
          - Neuroptera (Lacewings and allies)
      - Coleopterida
        - Coleoptera (beetles)
        - Strepsiptera (twisted-wing parasites)
    - Panorpida
      - Amphiesmenoptera
        - Trichoptera (caddisflies)
        - Lepidoptera (butterflies, moths)
      - Antliophora
        - Diptera
        - - Mecoptera (scorpionflies)
          - Siphonaptera (fleas)
