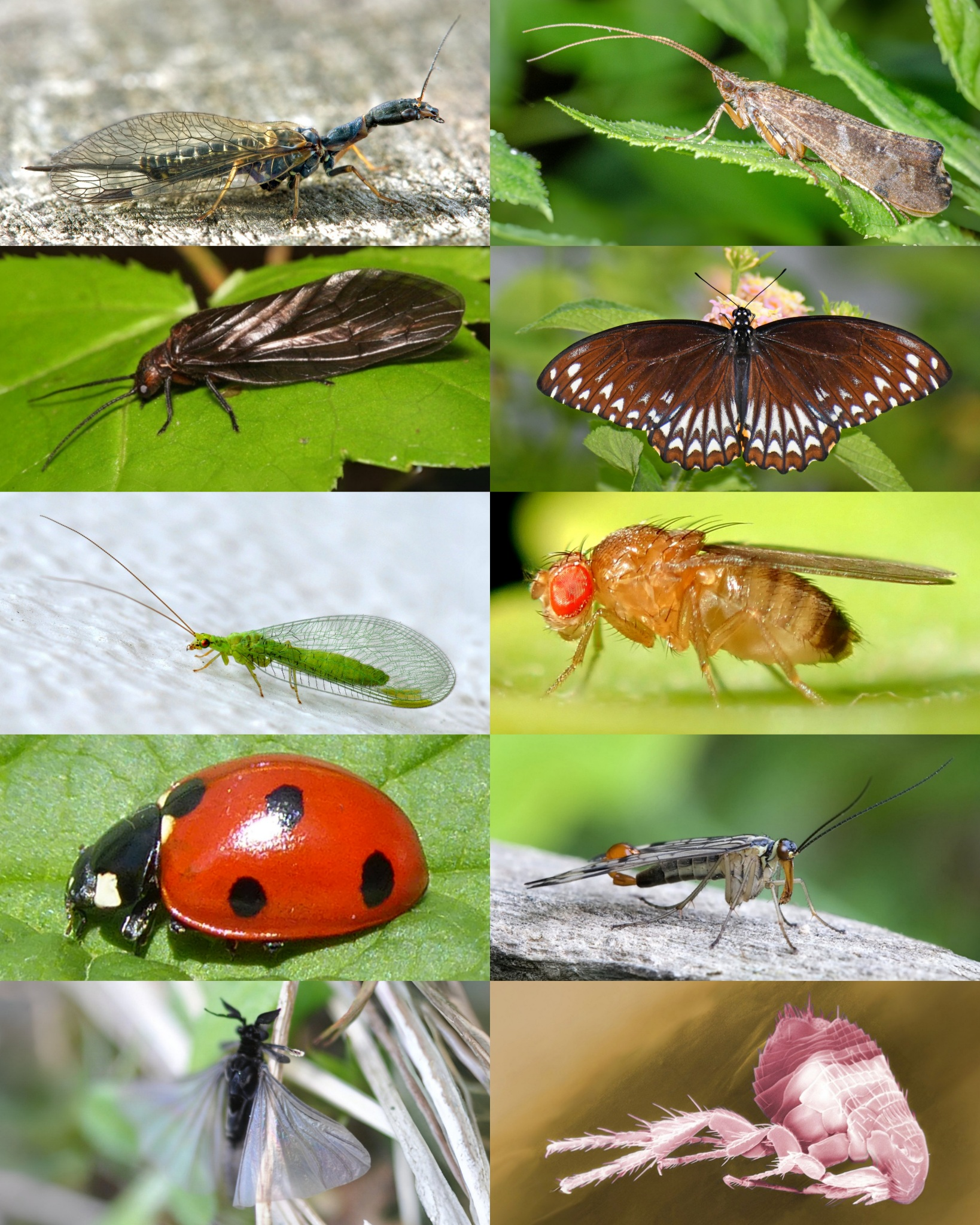
- All aparaglossata extant orders: row 1: Raphidioptera, Trichoptera row 2: Megaloptera, Lepidoptera row 3: Neuroptera, Diptera row 4: Coleoptera, Mecoptera row 5: Strepsiptera, Siphonaptera

Scientific classification
- Domain: Eukaryota
- Kingdom: Animalia
- Phylum: Arthropoda
- Class: Insecta
- Clade: Holometabola
- Clade: Aparaglossata; Peters et al. 2014

Clades
- Mecopterida; Neuropteroidea

= Aparaglossata =

Clade of insects

Aparaglossata is a clade of insects comprising all modern holometabolous insects except for Hymenoptera. The clade is named for one of its most recognizable synapomorphies (shared distinguishing feature); the absence of paraglossae. The clade is also characterized by a modification of the ovipositor and a reduction in number of Malpighian tubules.

The larval groundplan of Aparaglossata was prognathous, had well-developed stemmata, and had an H-shaped tentorium.

== Phylogeny ==
Phylogeny of Aparaglossata:

- Holometabola
  - Hymenopterida
    Hymenoptera (sawflies, wasps, ants, bees)
  - Aparaglossata
    - Neuropteroidea
      - Neuropterida
        - Raphidioptera (snakeflies)
        - - Megaloptera (alderflies and allies)
          - Neuroptera (lacewings and allies)
      - Coleopterida
        - Coleoptera (beetles)
        - Strepsiptera (twisted-wing parasites)
    - Panorpida
      - Amphiesmenoptera
        - Trichoptera (caddisflies)
        - Lepidoptera (butterflies, moths)
      - Antliophora
        - Diptera (true flies)
        - - Mecoptera (scorpionflies)
          - Siphonaptera (fleas)
