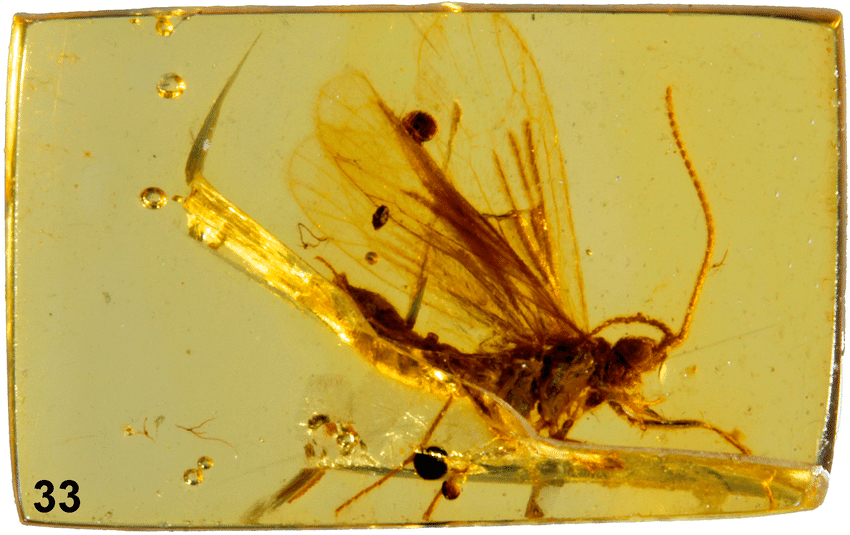
- Tarachocelis microlepidopterella
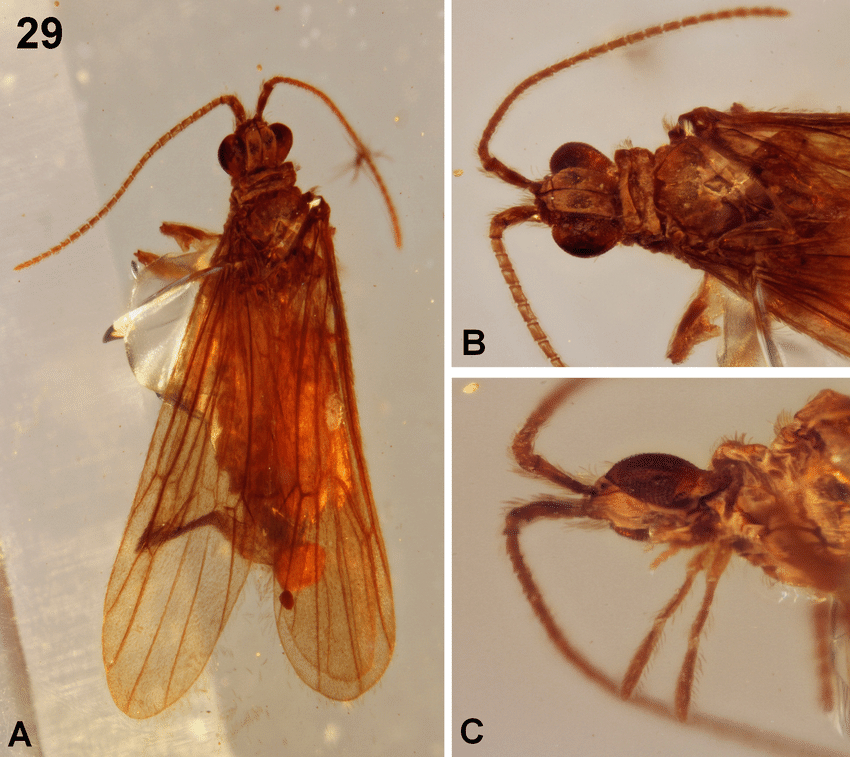
- Kinitocelis divisinotata

Scientific classification
- Kingdom: Animalia
- Phylum: Arthropoda
- Class: Insecta
- (unranked): Amphiesmenoptera
- Order: †Tarachoptera; Mey, Wichard, Müller and Wang, 2017

Families
- Tarachocelidae Mey, Wichard, Ross and Ross, 2017; Kinitocelis Mey, Wichard, Müller and Wang, 2017; Retortocelis Mey, et al, 2018; Tarachocelis Mey, Wichard, Ross and Ross, 2017

= Tarachoptera =

Tarachoptera Temporal range: Cenomanian

Extinct order of insects

Tarachoptera is an extinct order of insects, currently solely known from the mid Cretaceous aged Burmese amber. It belongs to Amphiesmenoptera alongside living Lepidopterans (butterflies and moths) and Trichoptera (caddiesflies), but is outside the clade containing the two groups, with an estimated divergence during the Upper Triassic, and therefore over a 100 million year ghost lineage. It currently contains only one family, the Tarachocelidae, which was named in a publication in 2017 a few months before the order itself was published. As the manuscript was in submission, an additional specimen belonging to a new genus justified creating a separate order. Additional species were described in 2018 and 2020. A notable character is the possession of wing scales like members of Lepidoptera, these were initially suggested to have been evolved in parallel evolution from hairs or setae, but a later study suggested that the scales of all amphiesmenopterans are homologous, sharing a common origin. Their flattened morphology and small size suggest they were adapted to living in small crevices; the morphology of the mouth suggests that they were phytophagous, and ingested small particles, perhaps including pollen grains.

== Taxonomy ==
- Tarachocelis Mey, Wichard, Müller et Wang, 2017
  - Tarachocelis microlepidopterella Mey, Wichard, Müller et Wang, 2017
- Kinitocelis Mey, Wichard, Müller et Wang, 2017
  - Kinitocelis brevicostata Mey, Wichard, Müller et Wang, 2017
  - Kinitocelis divisonotata Mey, Wichard, Müller et Wang, 2017
  - Kinitocelis hennigi Mey, Wichard, Müller et Wang, 2017
  - Kinitocelis macroptera Mey et al, 2020
  - Kinitocelis sparsella Mey et al, 2018
  - Kinitocelis dashengi Wang et al. 2022
- Retortocelis Mey et al, 2018
  - Retortocelis longella Mey et al, 2018
  - Retortocelis minimella Mey et al, 2018
  - Retortocelis spicipalpia Mey et al, 2020
  - Retortocelis tyloptera Mey et al, 2018
