= Cladochoristidae =

- Cladochorista belmontensis forewing. Length 4 mm.

Scientific classification
- Kingdom: Animalia
- Phylum: Arthropoda
- Clade: Pancrustacea
- Class: Insecta
- Clade: Amphiesmenoptera
- Order: †Cladochoroptera; Engel, 2022
- Family: †Cladochoristidae; Riek, 1953

Genera
- Cladochorista; Cladochoristella; Meloclada

Extinct amphiesmenopteran family

Cladochoristidae is a family of fossil amphiesmenopteran insects, variably assigned to Trichoptera or to its own order, Cladochoroptera.
