= Eruciform =

Term describing shapes of larvae

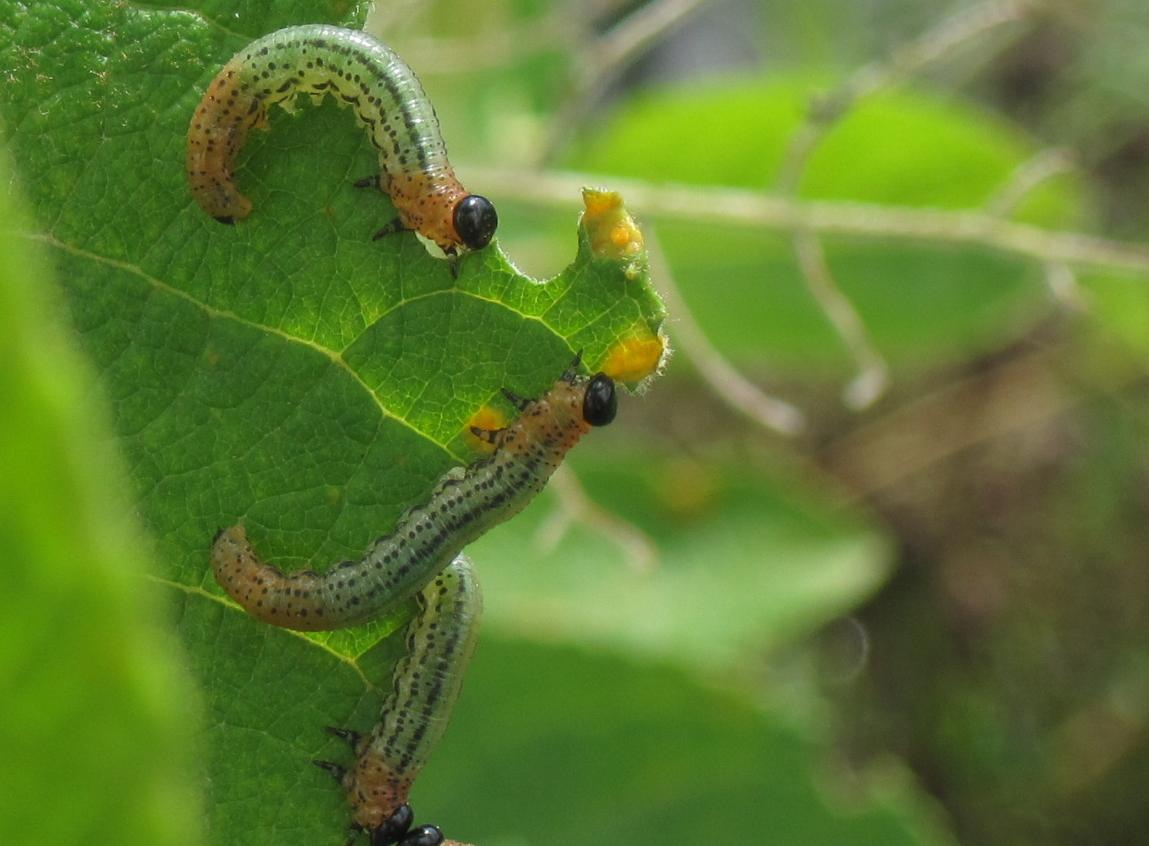
Deceptively caterpillar-like eruciform larvae of typical symphytan

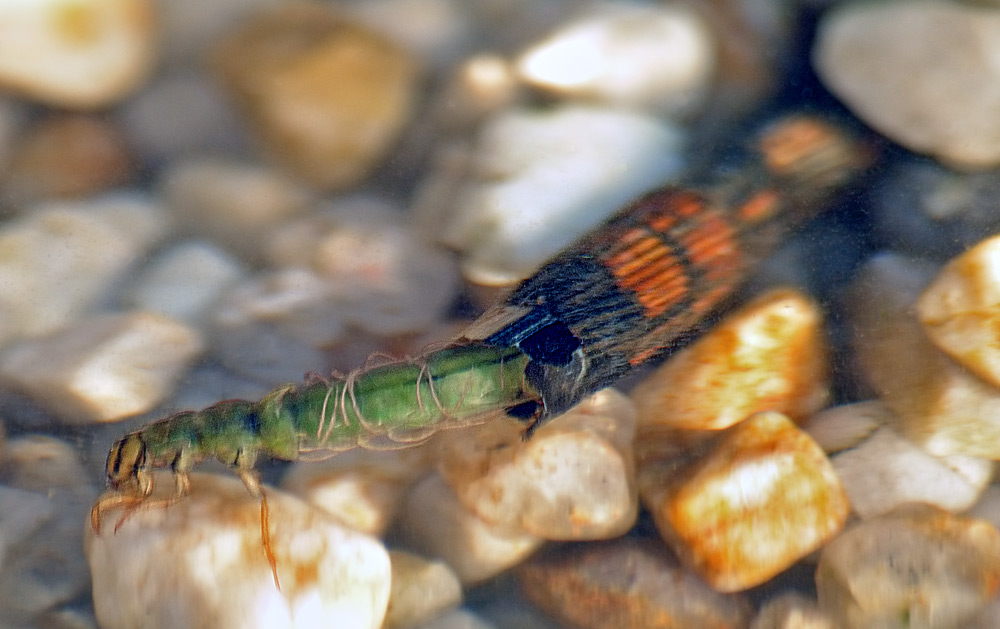
Larva of a trichopteran, extended part-way out of its case

Eruciform (literally: "caterpillar-shaped") is the entomological term describing a certain class of shapes of insect larvae.

== Origin and application ==
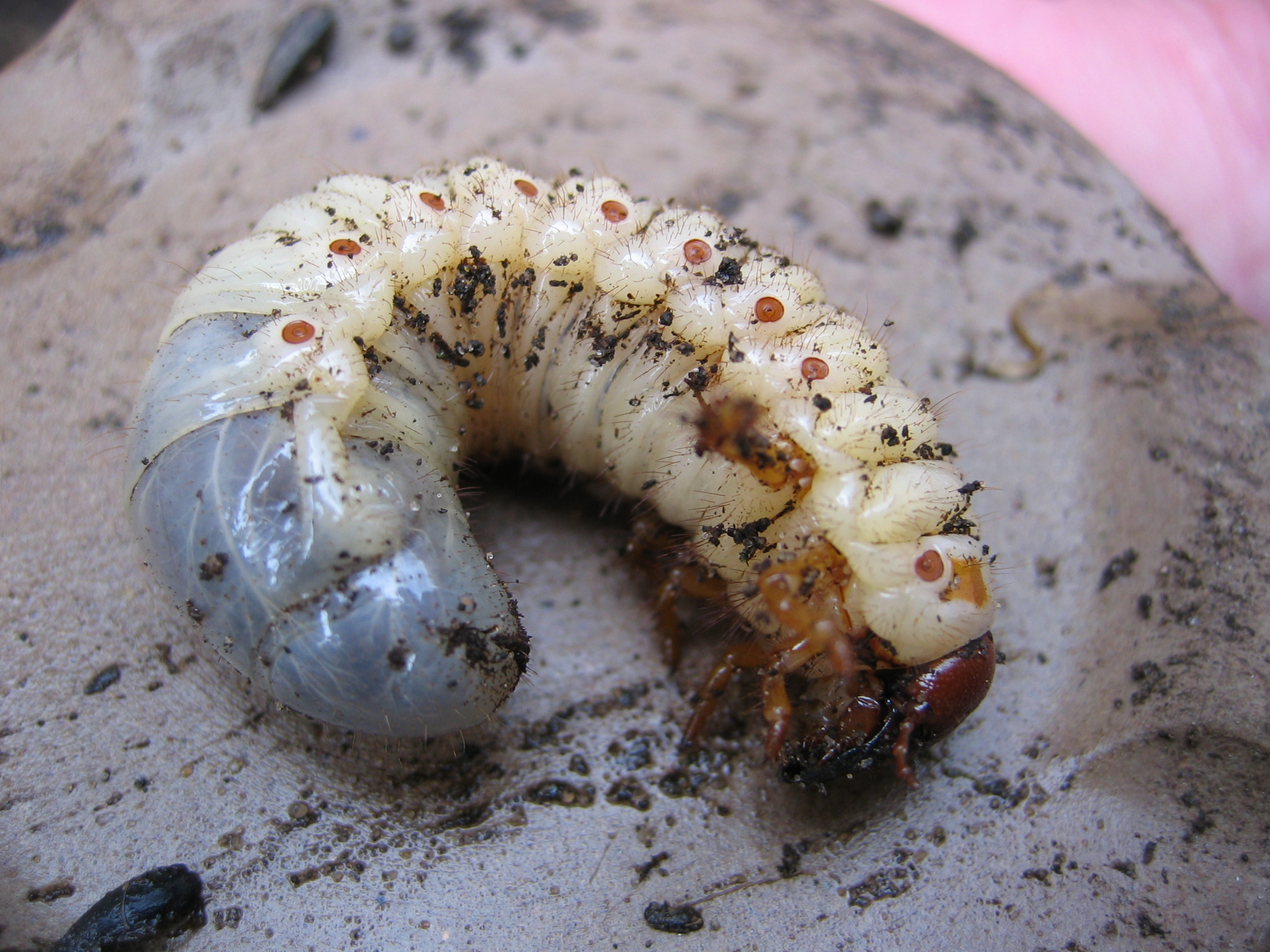
Larva of Oryctes nasicornis, Scarabaeidae

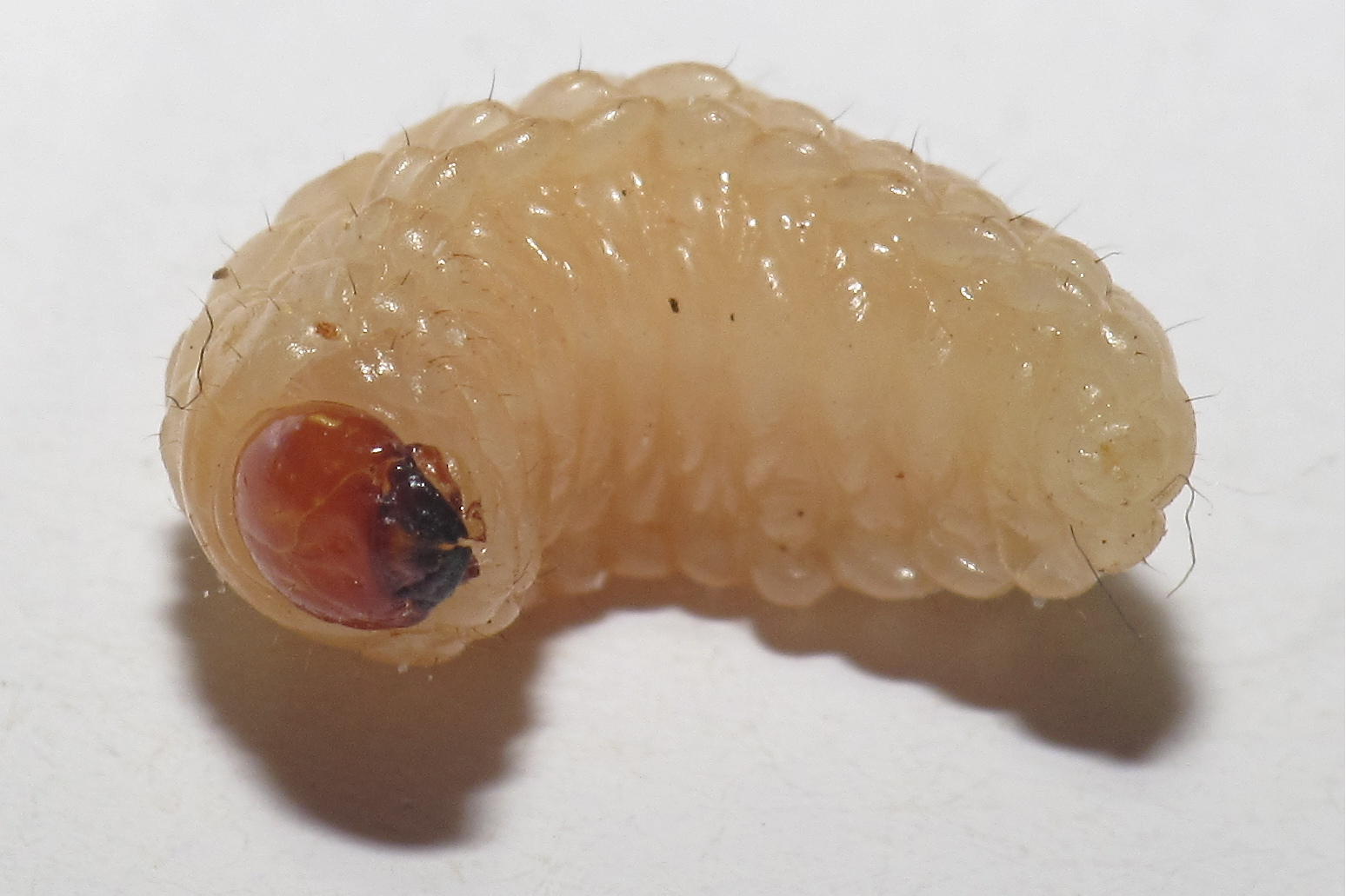
Larva typical of the Curculionidae

The word eruciform literally means "caterpillar-shaped" (from Latin "eruca", a caterpillar).

The term encompasses many variations in shape. Some larvae, for example, are in fact shaped like certain other, straight, eruciform larvae, except that they are curved into a C-shape. These are called "scarabaeiform" because it is the typical form of the larvae of the Scarabaeidae—the scarab beetles and their relatives. In contrast, larvae of the Curculionidae — the weevils — are also called "apodous eruciform", (literally meaning legless caterpillar-shaped; unlike scarab larvae, they do not have legs). This seems rather inconsistent, because commonly weevil larvae are almost as C-shaped as scarab larvae.

== Variations and implications ==
Some larvae, such as those of most beetles in the family Chrysomelidae, are described as eruciform, although they are short, have swollen abdomens, and have no true "prolegs" such as caterpillars have. Typically they walk freely on leaves and similar surfaces, using the "true" six legs on the three thoracic segments just behind the head. The abdomen is carried behind as a more or less swollen, hump-backed rear end.

In contrast, larvae of the Cerambycidae (Longhorn beetles) are generally straight and could fairly be described as "apodous eruciform". They live in tunnels, typically in wood, where a distended abdomen would be a liability and legs are not the only option for locomotion. Instead of using legs Cerambycid larvae press fleshy bulges against the walls of their tunnels.

Arguably the most typically eruciform larvae, prolegs and all, are to be found among the butterflies and moths (Lepidoptera), caddis larvae (Trichoptera), and sawflies (Symphyta).
