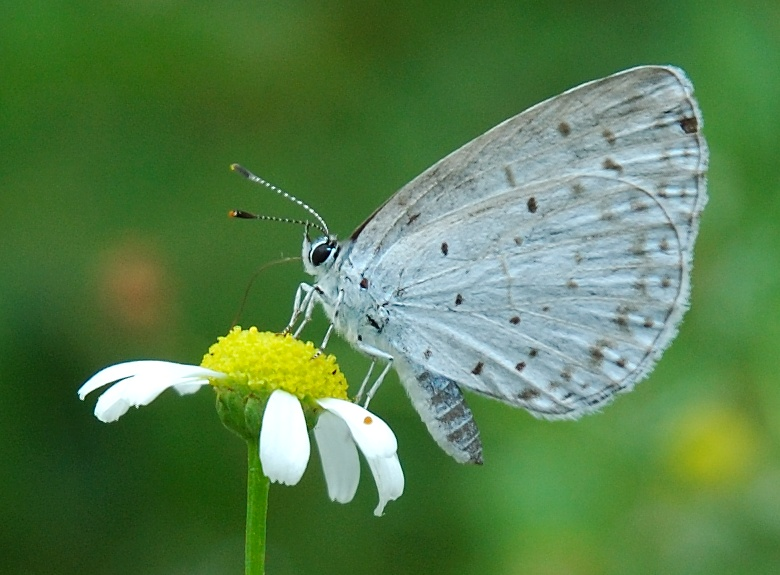
- Celastrina argiolus

Scientific classification
- Kingdom: Animalia
- Phylum: Arthropoda
- Clade: Pancrustacea
- Class: Insecta
- Clade: Aparaglossata
- Superorder: Panorpida

Clades
- Amphiesmenoptera; Antliophora

= Panorpida =

Superorder of insects

Panorpida or Mecopterida is a superorder of Holometabola. The conjectured monophyly of the Panorpida is historically based on morphological evidence, namely the reduction or loss of the ovipositor and several internal characteristics, including a muscle connecting a pleuron and the first axillary sclerite at the base of the wing, various features of the larval maxilla and labium, and basal fusion of CuP and A1 veins in the hind wings. The monophyly of the Panorpida is supported by recent molecular data.

- Holometabola (Endopterygota)
  - Hymenopterida
    Hymenoptera (sawflies, wasps, ants, bees)
  - Aparaglossata
    - Neuropteroidea
      - Neuropterida
        - Raphidioptera (snakeflies)
        - - Megaloptera (alderflies and allies)
          - Neuroptera (lacewings and allies)
      - Coleopterida
        - Coleoptera (beetles)
        - Strepsiptera (twisted-wing parasites)
    - Panorpida
      - Amphiesmenoptera
        - Trichoptera (caddisflies)
        - Lepidoptera (butterflies, moths)
      - Antliophora

== Antliophora ==
The Panorpid clade Antliophora contains one of the major phylogenetic puzzles among the Insecta. It is unclear as of 2020 whether the Mecoptera (scorpionflies and allies) form a single clade, or whether the Siphonaptera (fleas) are inside that clade, so that the traditional "Mecoptera" is paraphyletic. However the earlier suggestion that the Siphonaptera are sister to the Boreidae (snow scorpionflies) is not supported; instead, there is the possibility that they are sister to another Mecopteran family, the Nannochoristidae of the Southern hemisphere. The two possible trees are shown below:

(a) Mecoptera is paraphyletic, containing Siphonaptera:

- Antliophora
  - Diptera (true flies)
  - - Pistillifera (scorpionflies, hangingflies, 400 spp.)
    - - - Nannochoristidae (southern scorpionflies, 8 spp.)
        - Siphonaptera (fleas, 2500 spp.)
      - Boreidae (snow scorpionflies, 30 spp.)

(b) Mecoptera is monophyletic, sister to Siphonaptera

- Antliophora
  - Diptera (true flies)
  - - Mecoptera
      - - Pistillifera (scorpionflies, hangingflies, 400 spp.)
        - Boreidae (snow scorpionflies, 30 spp.)
      - Nannochoristidae (southern scorpionflies, 8 spp.)
    - Siphonaptera (fleas, 2500 spp.)
