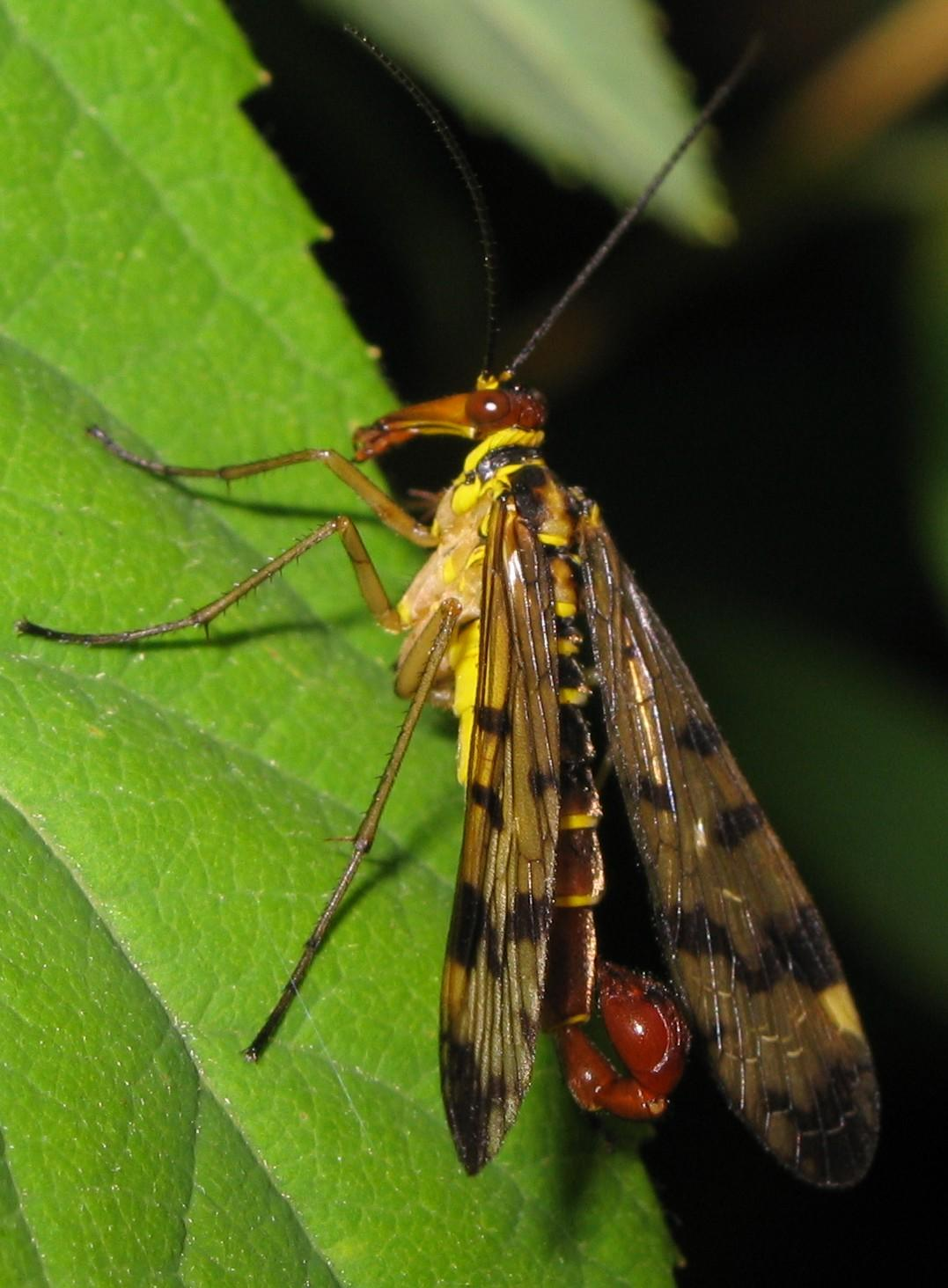
- Panorpa communis, a scorpionfly (order Mecoptera)

Scientific classification
- Kingdom: Animalia
- Phylum: Arthropoda
- Clade: Pancrustacea
- Class: Insecta
- Clade: Eumetabola
- Clade: Holometabola; Burmeister, 1835

Orders
- See text

Synonyms
- Endopterygota Sharp, 1898

= Holometabola =

Holometabola Temporal range: Pennsylvanian–Recent Molecular clock indicates a possible Mississippian origin

Clade of insects

Holometabola (from Ancient Greek holo- "complete" + metabolḗ "change"), also known as Endopterygota (from endo- "inner" + ptéryg- "wing" + Neo-Latin -ota "-having"), is a supra-ordinal clade of insects within the infraclass Neoptera that go through distinctive larval, pupal, and adult stages. They undergo a radical metamorphosis, with the larval and adult stages differing considerably in their structure and behaviour. This is called holometabolism, or complete metamorphism.

== Evolution ==
The Holometabola constitute the most diverse insect superorder, with over 1 million living species divided between 11 orders, containing insects such as butterflies, flies, fleas, bees, ants, and beetles.

The earliest holometabolan fossils date from the Carboniferous.

The Holometabola are sometimes divided into three assemblages: Neuropterida (Neuroptera, Megaloptera, Raphidioptera, Strepsiptera and Coleoptera), Hymenopteroida (Hymenoptera), and Panorpida (Siphonaptera, Diptera, Trichoptera, Lepidoptera and Mecoptera).

Molecular analysis has clarified the group's phylogeny, as shown in the cladogram.

- Holometabola (Endopterygota)
  - Hymenopterida
    Hymenoptera (sawflies, wasps, ants, bees)
  - Aparaglossata
    - Neuropteroidea
      - Neuropterida
        - Raphidioptera (snakeflies)
        - - Megaloptera (alderflies and allies)
          - Neuroptera (Lacewings and allies)
      - Coleopterida
        - Coleoptera (beetles)
        - Strepsiptera (twisted-wing parasites)
    - Panorpida
      - Amphiesmenoptera
        - Trichoptera (caddisflies)
        - Lepidoptera (butterflies, moths)
      - Antliophora
        - Diptera (true flies)
        - - Mecoptera (scorpionflies)
          - Siphonaptera (fleas)

== Description ==
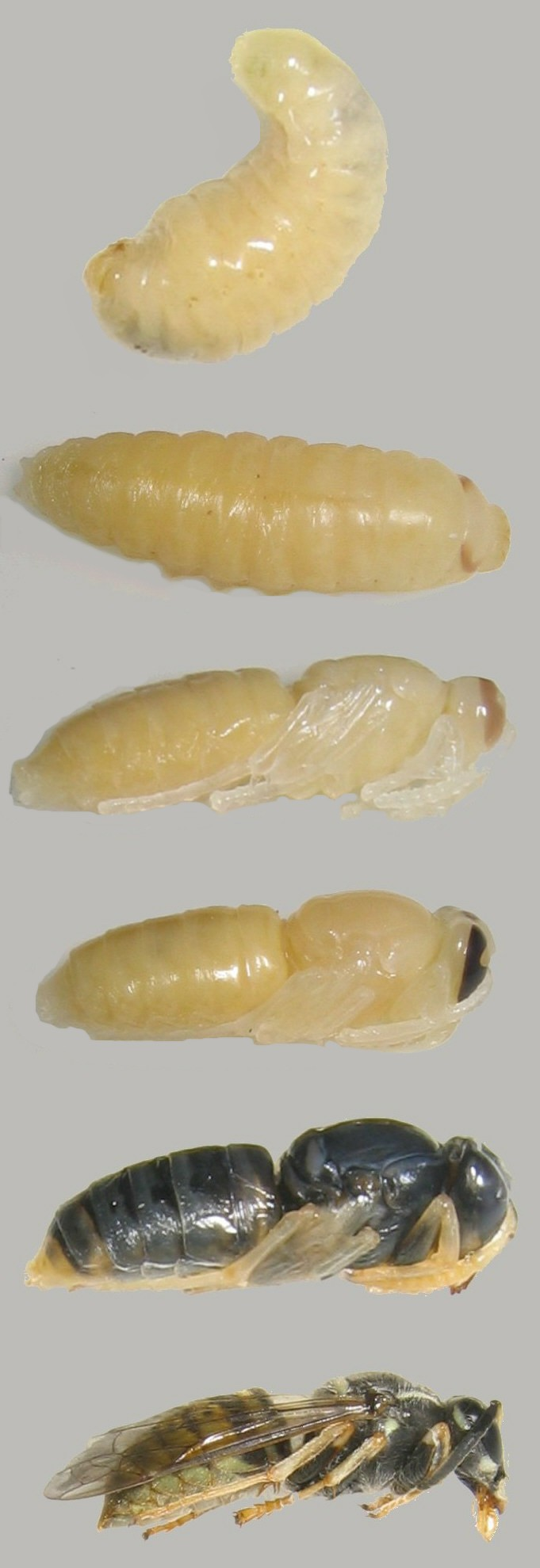
Holometabolism stages in Hymenoptera

The Endopterygota are distinguished from the Exopterygota ("external winged forms") by the way in which their wings develop. Endopterygota ("internal winged forms") develop wings inside the body and undergo an elaborate metamorphosis, holometabolism, involving a pupal stage. The Exopterygota develop wings on the outside of their bodies and do not go through a pupal stage. The Exopterygota are not a natural group (they are paraphyletic).

== See also ==
- Insect morphology
