= Tentorium =

The tentorium (plural tentoria) is a term used to refer to the framework of internal supports within an arthropod head. The tentorium is formed by ingrowths of the exoskeleton, called apodemes, which fuse in various ways to provide rigid support for the muscles of the head.
