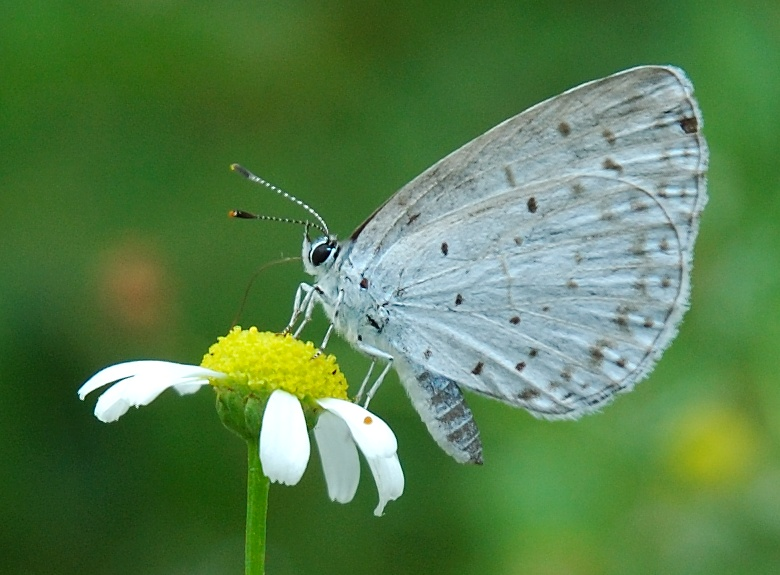
- Celastrina argiolus (Lepidoptera)
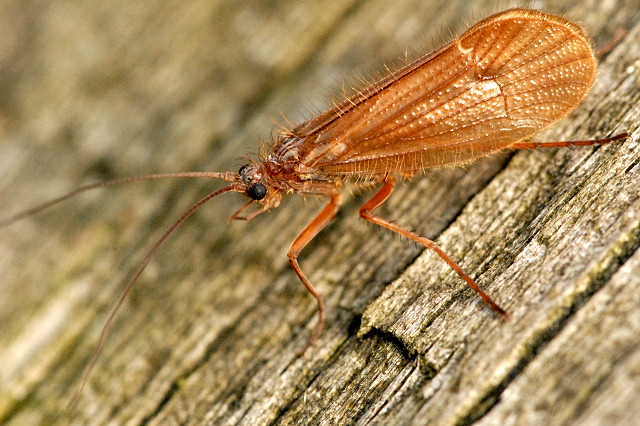
- Chaetopteryx villosa (Trichoptera)

Scientific classification
- Kingdom: Animalia
- Phylum: Arthropoda
- Clade: Pancrustacea
- Class: Insecta
- Superorder: Panorpida
- Clade: Amphiesmenoptera; Kiriakoff, 1948

Orders
- †Permotrichoptera; †Protomeroptera; Grandorder Metamphiesmenoptera; †Cladochoroptera; Euorder Euamphiesmenoptera; †Eocoronoptera; Dysorder Panendymenoptera; †Necrotrichoptera; Mirorder Endymenoptera; †Tarachoptera; Epiorder Stelloptera; Trichoptera; Lepidoptera

= Amphiesmenoptera =

Superorder of insects

Amphiesmenoptera is an insect superorder, established by S. G. Kiriakoff, but often credited to Willi Hennig in his revision of insect taxonomy for two sister orders: Lepidoptera (butterflies and moths) and Trichoptera (caddisflies). In 2017, a third fossil order was added to the group, the Tarachoptera.

Trichoptera and Lepidoptera share a number of derived characters (synapomorphies) which demonstrate their common descent:

- Females, rather than males, are heterogametic (i.e. their sex chromosomes differ).
- Dense setae are present in the wings (modified into scales in Lepidoptera).
- There is a particular venation pattern on the forewings (the double-looped anal veins).
- Larvae have mouth structures and glands to make and manipulate silk.

Thus, these two extant orders are sisters, with Tarachoptera basal to both groups. Amphiesmenoptera probably evolved in the Jurassic. Lepidoptera differ from the Trichoptera in several features, including wing venation, form of the scales on the wings, loss of the cerci, loss of an ocellus, and changes to the legs.

Amphiesmenoptera are thought to be the sister group of Antliophora, a proposed superorder comprising Diptera (flies), Siphonaptera (fleas) and Mecoptera (scorpionflies). Together, Amphiesmenoptera and Antliophora compose the group Mecopterida.
