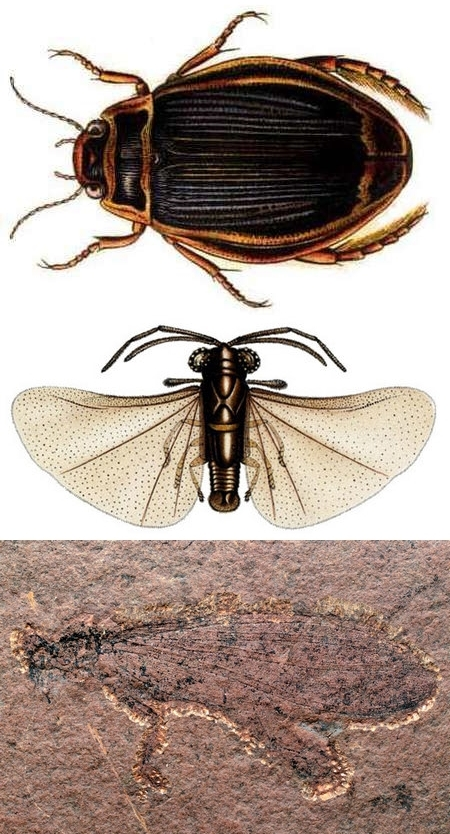
- Dytiscus latissimus (Coleoptera), Caenocholax fenyesi (Strepsiptera) and Stephanastus polinae (Skleroptera)

Scientific classification
- Kingdom: Animalia
- Phylum: Arthropoda
- Clade: Pancrustacea
- Class: Insecta
- Clade: Holometabola
- Clade: Aparaglossata
- Clade: Neuropteroidea
- Clade: Coleopterida

Orders
- Coleoptera; Strepsiptera; †Skleroptera (Stephanastus) (disputed)

= Coleopterida =

Coleopterida Temporal range: Permian–Present

Superorder of insects

Coleopterida is a superorder of insects consisting of the orders Coleoptera and Strepsiptera. It is established as the sister group of Neuropterida based on phylogenetic analysis of DNA sequence data. The grouping is also supported by morphological data. The Coleopterida are estimated to have first appeared during the Carboniferous period, but the earliest confirmed fossils of the group date to the Permian. The Carboniferous insect species Stephanastus polinae has been interpreted by some authors as the sister group of Coleoptera and Strepsiptera (as its own extinct order, Skleroptera), but this interpretation has been disputed and it has been alternatively suggested to be a member of the extinct order Protelytroptera (a stem group of the modern Dermaptera, the earwigs).
