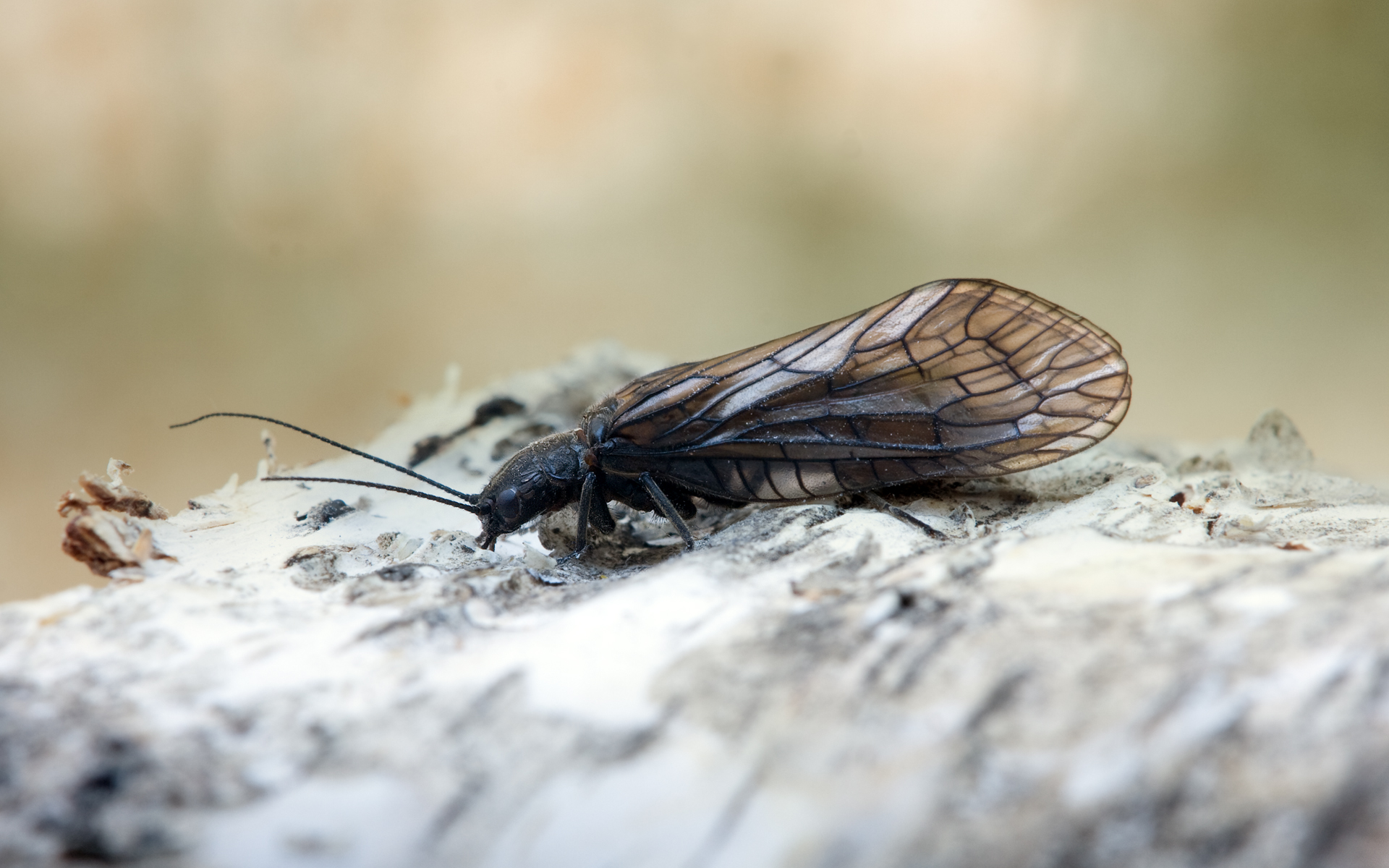
- Sialis lutaria (Megaloptera: Sialidae)

Scientific classification
- Kingdom: Animalia
- Phylum: Arthropoda
- Clade: Pancrustacea
- Class: Insecta
- Clade: Holometabola
- Clade: Aparaglossata
- Clade: Neuropteroidea
- Clade: Neuropterida

Orders
- Megaloptera; Neuroptera; Raphidioptera; and see text

Synonyms
- Neuroptera sensu Palker, 1982

= Neuropterida =

Clade of insects

The Neuropterida are a clade of holometabolous insects, sometimes placed at the superorder level. The clade contains the orders Neuroptera (lacewings, antlions), Megaloptera (alderflies, dobsonflies), and Raphidioptera (snakeflies), and includes over 5,700 described species.

Historically, the name Neuroptera referred to this entire group, but it now refers only to lacewings and their relatives (antlions), which were formerly known as Planipennia. As part of the Holometabola and related to beetles, they can be considered an unranked taxon. Arguably, the Holometabola might instead be considered an unranked clade, and divided into numerous superorders to signify the close relationships of certain holometabolan groups.

Some authors formerly included the Mecoptera (scorpionflies) in Neuropterida, but they actually belong to the Mecopteroidea (or Antliophora), the holometabolan clade that also contains true flies and fleas.

Neuropterida are fairly primitive-looking insects with large wings but weak wing muscles, resulting in clumsy flight. Most adults are active at dusk or night, and many of the larvae are aquatic that live in rivers. The larvae, and in many cases the adults as well, are predators of small arthropods. Adult neuropteridans range in size from that of a midge to that of a large dragonfly (15 cm (5.9 in) wingspan); the largest species tend to resemble drab, clumsily flying damselflies.

In Raphidioptera the ovipositor is well developed, but strongly reduced in Megaloptera and Neuroptera.

The larvae of Neuroptera spin a cocoon of silk around them, while a cocoon is absent in both Megaloptera and Raphidioptera, although the megalopteran genus Protohermes lines its pupal cell with coarse gravel partially bound with silk.

In addition to the three living orders, the monotypic Rafaelidae are an entirely extinct family of Neuropterida. Their position is indeterminate but probably rather basal; thus, the single genus Rafaeliana from the Early Cretaceous Santana Formation's Crato Member in Brazil might be better placed directly in the Neuropterida for the time being, without assigning it to an order, until relatives are found and/or its systematic position is better resolved. The extinct order Glosselytrodea may also be a member or close relative, though its classification is unclear.

A phylogenomic analysis published in 2023 confirmed the topology of the neuropterid orders and found the relationships between the families of Neuropterida as shown in the following phylogenetic tree.

- Neuropterida
  - Raphidioptera (snakeflies)
  - - Megaloptera (alderflies and allies)
    - - Neuroptera
        - - Coniopterygoidea
            Coniopterygidae (dustywings)
          - Euneuroptera
            - - Osmyloidea
                - Osmylidae (giant lacewings)
                - - Nevrorthidae
                  - Sisyridae (spongillaflies)
            - - - Dilaroidea
                  Dilaridae (pleasing lacewings)
              - - - Chrysopoidea
                    Chrysopidae (green lacewings)
                  - Mantispoidea
                    - Rhachiberothidae (thorny lacewings)
                    - - Mantispidae (mantidflies)
                      - - Symphrasinae
                        - Berothidae (beaded lacewings)
                - - Neoneuroptera
                    - Hemerobiidae (brown lacewings)
                    - Geoneuroptera
                      - Ithonoidea
                        Ithonidae (moth lacewings)
                      - Myrmeleontiformia
                        - Psychopsoidea
                          Psychopsidae (silky lacewings)
                        - Myrmeleontoidea
                          - Nymphidae (split-footed lacewings)
                          - - Nemopteridae (spoonwings)
                            - - Myrmeleontidae (antlions)
                              - Ascalaphidae (owlflies)
