= Rafaelnymphes =

Rafaelnymphes Temporal range: Aptian

Scientific classification
- Domain: Eukaryota
- Kingdom: Animalia
- Phylum: Arthropoda
- Class: Insecta
- Order: Neuroptera
- Family: Nymphidae
- Genus: †Rafaelnymphes; Myskowiak et al, 2016
- Species: †R. cratoensis

Binomial name
- †Rafaelnymphes cratoensis Myskowiak et al, 2016

Extinct genus of insects

Rafaelnymphes is an extinct genus of lacewing in the family Nymphidae known from a fossil found in South America. The genus contains a single species, Rafaelnymphes cratoensis.

== History and classification ==
When first described, R. cratoensis was known from a single fossil adult which is a compression-impression fossil preserved in layers of soft sedimentary rock. Along with other well-preserved insect fossils, the R. cratoensis specimen was collected from layers of the Upper Aptian Crato Formation. The formation is composed of unweathered grey and oxidized yellow limestones, which preserved numerous insects, fish, birds and reptiles as a notable lagerstätten. The area is a preserved inland lake or one of a series of lakes, though the nature as a fresh or salt-water body is uncertain. The depth of the basin has been suggested as either shallow or fairly deep. The basin formed near the center of the supercontinent Gondwana during the early part of the diversification of flowering plants.

The R. cratoensis holotype specimen was preserved in the Wyoming Dinosaur Center-Crato collection when first studied. The fossil was described by an international team of paleontologists led by Justine Myskowiak in a 2016 paper. The genus name is a combination of Rafael, a patronym honoring Rafael Martins-Neto who specialized in insects of the Crato Formation and nymphes, taken from the family name Nymphidae. They coined the specific epithet cratoensis in reference to the type locality the Crato Formation.

R. cratoensis is one of several neuropteran species described from the Crato Formation. Other species include the nymphid Araripenymphes seldoni, the ithonid Principiala incerta and the kalligrammatids Makarkinia adamsi and Makarkinia kerneri.

== Description ==
The single fossil has a full body length of approximately 24.0 mm (0.94 in), and is mostly complete, being fossilized upside down with the legs upwards. The antennae, parts of the legs and the genitalia were not preserved. Additionally, details of the upper body, such as the presence of ocelli could not be determined. The head is rectangular in outline with the large compound eyes positioned on the sides. The preserved sections of the legs are slender and attached to the 6.0 mm (0.24 in) long prothorax. The 21.0 mm (0.83 in) long forewings are a dark brown coloring with area and spots that are a slightly darkener tone, possibly preserved color patterning. There are small trichosors present along the apical rear edges of the forewings, and as typical for the family, nygmata are not present on any of the wings. The forewings and hindwings are preserved overlapping each other, obscuring detail of the hindwing venation.
