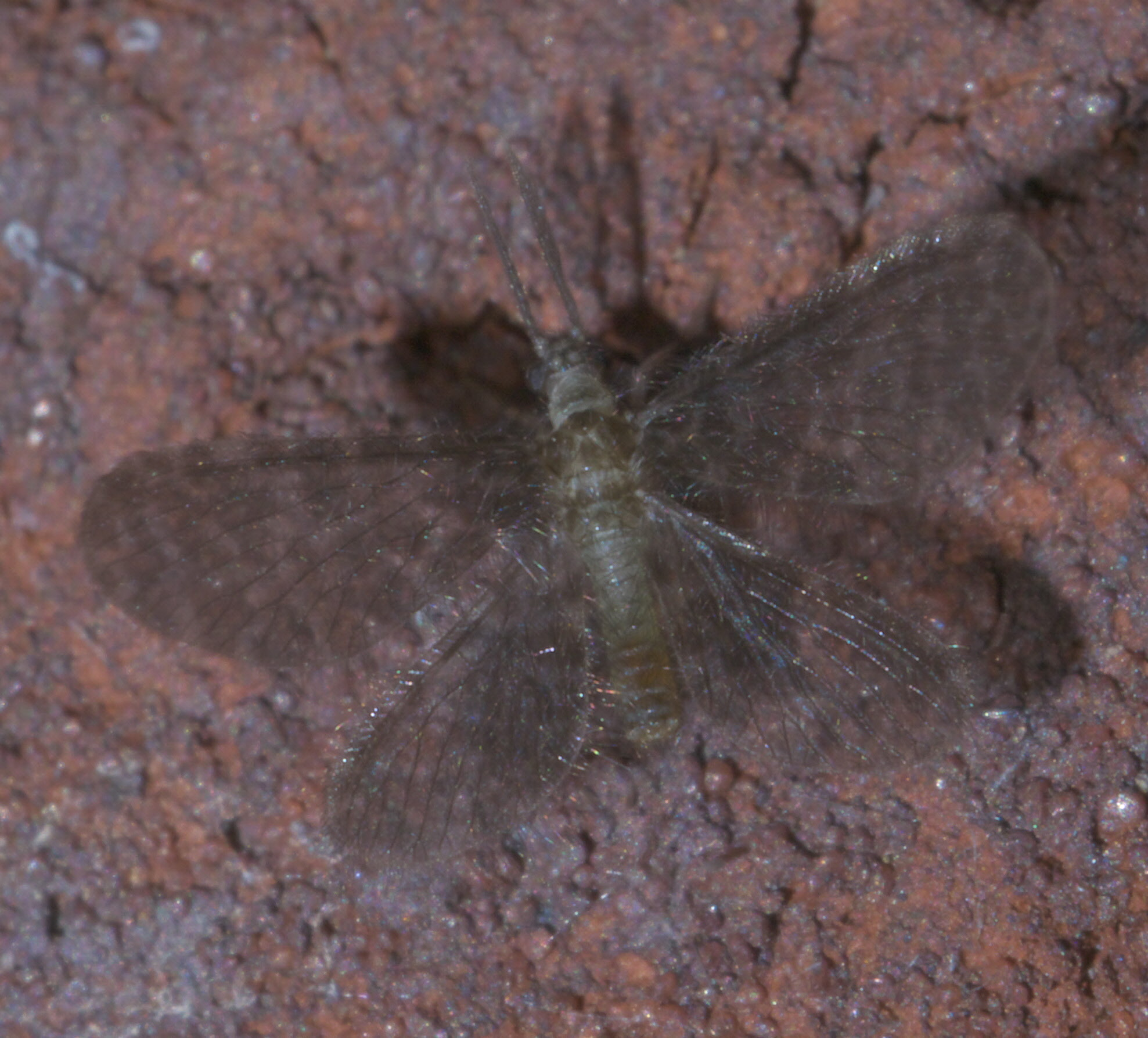

Scientific classification
- Domain: Eukaryota
- Kingdom: Animalia
- Phylum: Arthropoda
- Class: Insecta
- Order: Neuroptera
- Family: Dilaridae
- Genus: Nallachius
- Species: N. americanus

Binomial name
- Nallachius americanus (McLachlan, 1881)

Synonyms
- Dilar americanus McLachlan, 1881

= Nallachius americanus =

Species of insect

Nallachius americanus is a species of pleasing lacewing in the family Dilaridae. It is found in the Caribbean Sea, North America, and South America.

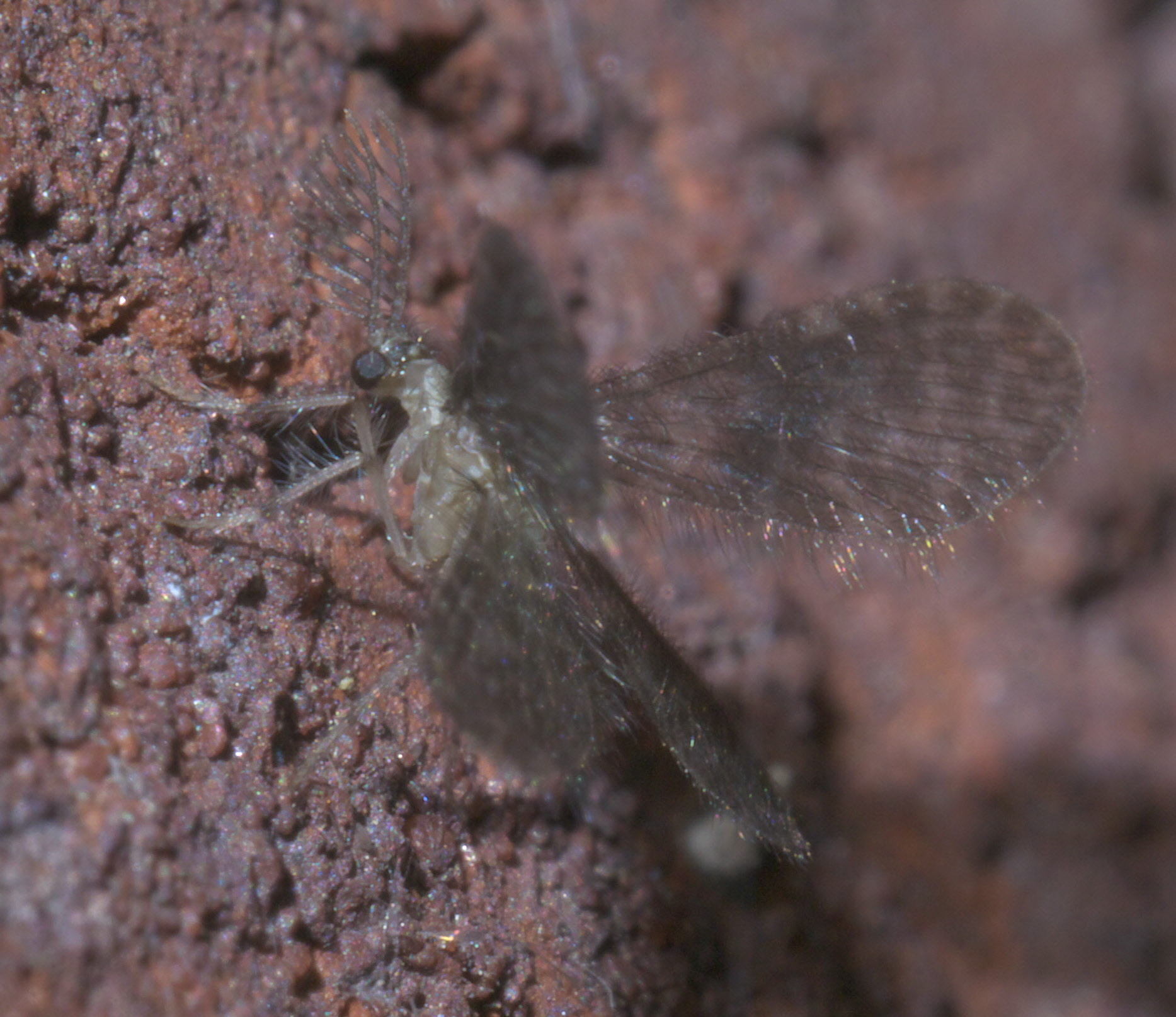
