= Pronymphes =

Pronymphes Temporal range: Priabonian

Scientific classification
- Domain: Eukaryota
- Kingdom: Animalia
- Phylum: Arthropoda
- Class: Insecta
- Order: Neuroptera
- Family: Nymphidae
- Genus: †Pronymphes; Krüger, 1923

Species
- Pronymphes mengeana Krüger, 1923; Pronymphes hoffeinsorum Archibald, Makarkin & Ansorge, 2009

Extinct genus of insects

Pronymphes is an extinct genus of lacewing which existed during the Eocene period. It contains two species, Pronymphes mengeana and P. hoffeinsorum.
