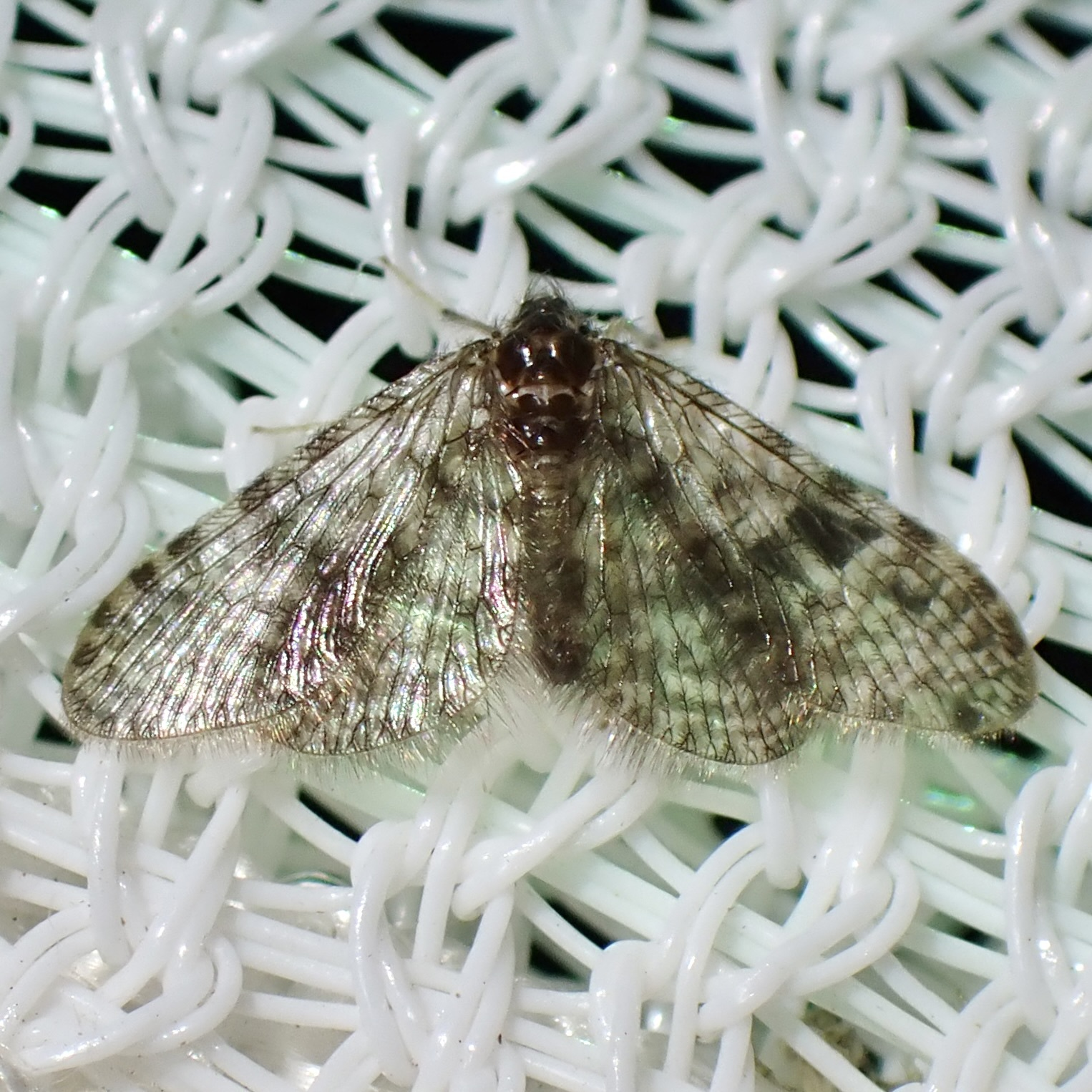

Scientific classification
- Domain: Eukaryota
- Kingdom: Animalia
- Phylum: Arthropoda
- Class: Insecta
- Order: Neuroptera
- Family: Dilaridae
- Genus: Nallachius
- Species: N. pulchellus

Binomial name
- Nallachius pulchellus (Banks, 1938)

Synonyms
- Dilar pulchellus Banks, 1938

= Nallachius pulchellus =

Species of insect

Nallachius pulchellus is a species of pleasing lacewing in the family Dilaridae. It is found in the Caribbean Sea, Central America, and North America.
