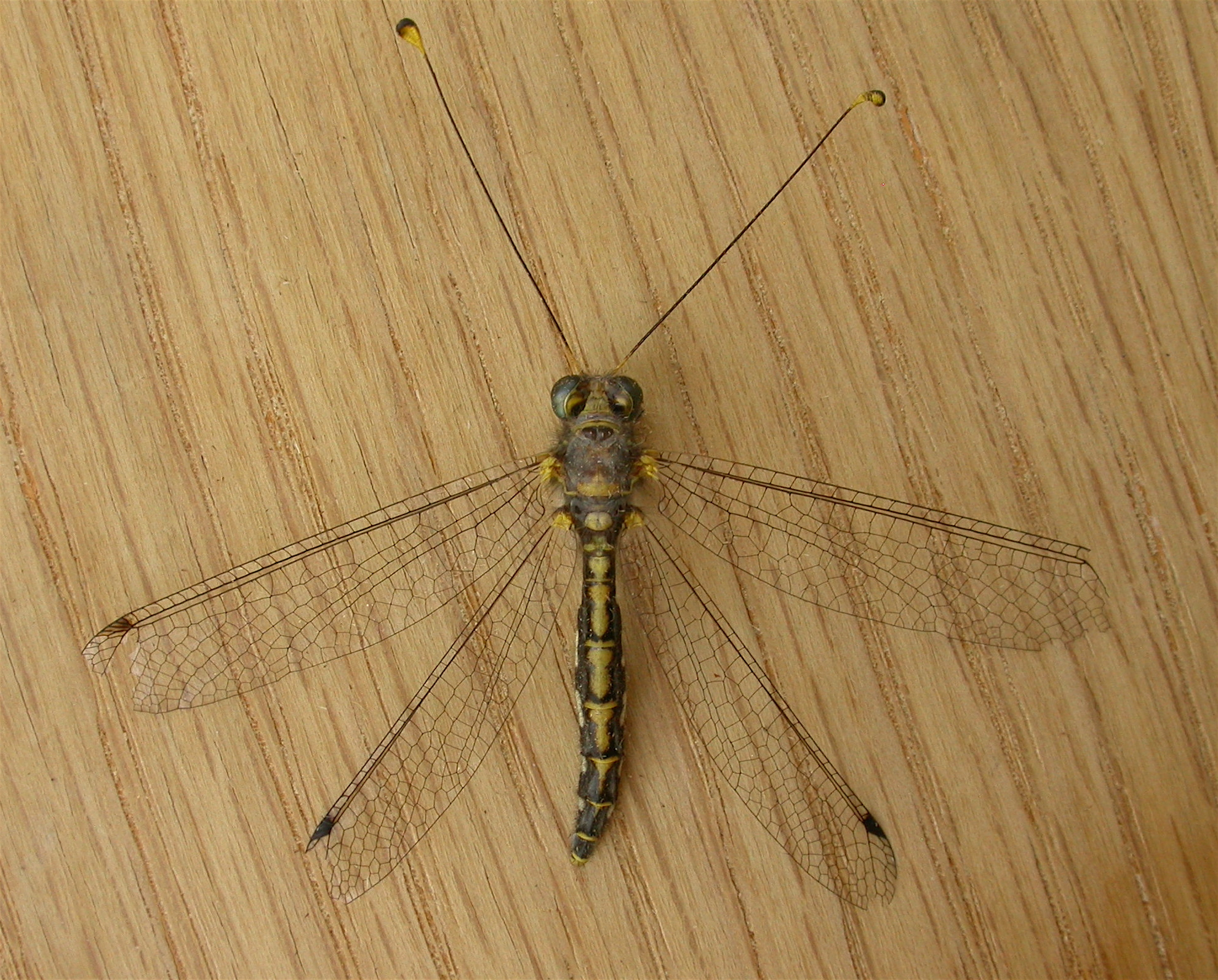
- Myrmeleontiformia

Scientific classification
- Domain: Eukaryota
- Kingdom: Animalia
- Phylum: Arthropoda
- Class: Insecta
- Order: Neuroptera
- Clade: Geoneuroptera
- Clade: Myrmeleontiformia

Superfamilies
- See text

= Myrmeleontiformia =

Suborder of insects

Myrmeleontiformia is an insect clade in the order Neuroptera, and which was historically treated as a suborder. The phylogeny of the Neuroptera has been explored using mitochondrial DNA sequences, and while issues remain for the order as a whole, such as "Hemerobiiformia" being paraphyletic, Myrmeleontiformia is generally agreed to be monophyletic, with one study giving the following cladogram:

- Neuroptera
  - Osmylidae (formerly in "Hemerobiiformia")
  - - Most of former "Hemerobiiformia"
      - Mantispidae (mantidflies)
      - - Ithonidae (moth lacewings)
        - Chrysopidae (green lacewings)
    - Myrmeleontiformia
      - Nymphidae (split-footed lacewings)
      - - Myrmeleontidae (antlions)
        - Ascalaphidae (owlflies)

== Superfamilies and families ==
Clade Myrmeleontiformia

- Superfamily Myrmeleontoidea (syn Nemopteroidea)
  - Family Ascalaphidae: owlflies (possibly in Myrmeleontoidea)
  - Family †Babinskaiidae
  - Family Myrmeleontidae: antlions (includes Palaeoleontidae)
  - Family Nemopteridae: spoonwings etc (formerly in Myrmeleontoidea)
  - Family Nymphidae: split-footed lacewings (includes Myiodactylidae)
  - Family †Rafaelianidae
- Superfamily Psychopsoidea
  - Family †Aetheogrammatidae
  - Family †Kalligrammatidae
  - Family †Osmylopsychopidae (syn †Brongniartiellidae)
  - Family †Panfiloviidae (syn †Grammosmylidae)
  - Family †Prohemerobiidae
  - Family Psychopsidae: silky lacewings
