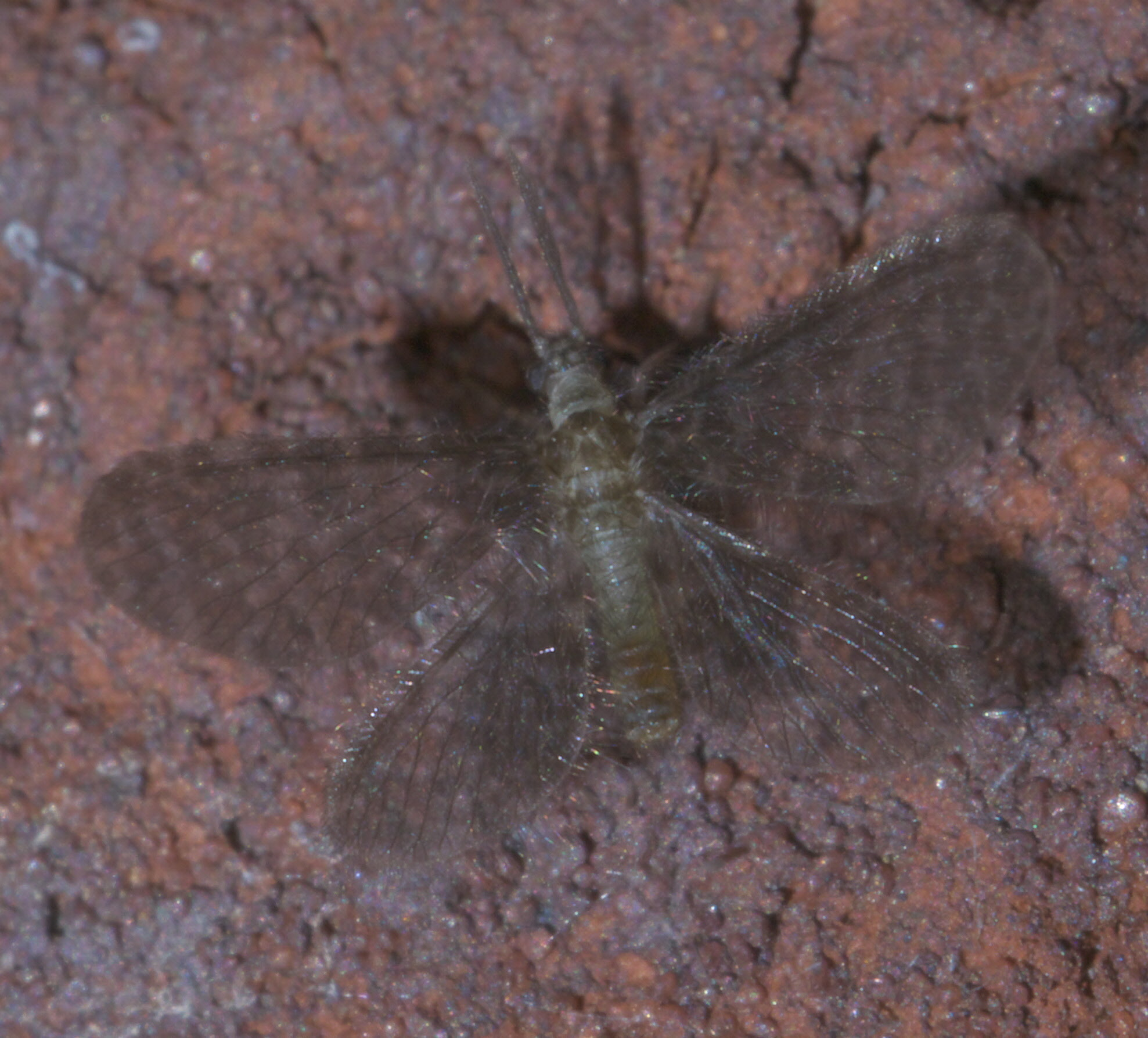
- Nallachius americanus

Scientific classification
- Domain: Eukaryota
- Kingdom: Animalia
- Phylum: Arthropoda
- Class: Insecta
- Order: Neuroptera
- Family: Dilaridae
- Genus: Nallachius; Navás, 1909

= Nallachius =

Genus of insects

Nallachius is a genus of pleasing lacewings in the family Dilaridae. There are more than 20 described species in Nallachius.

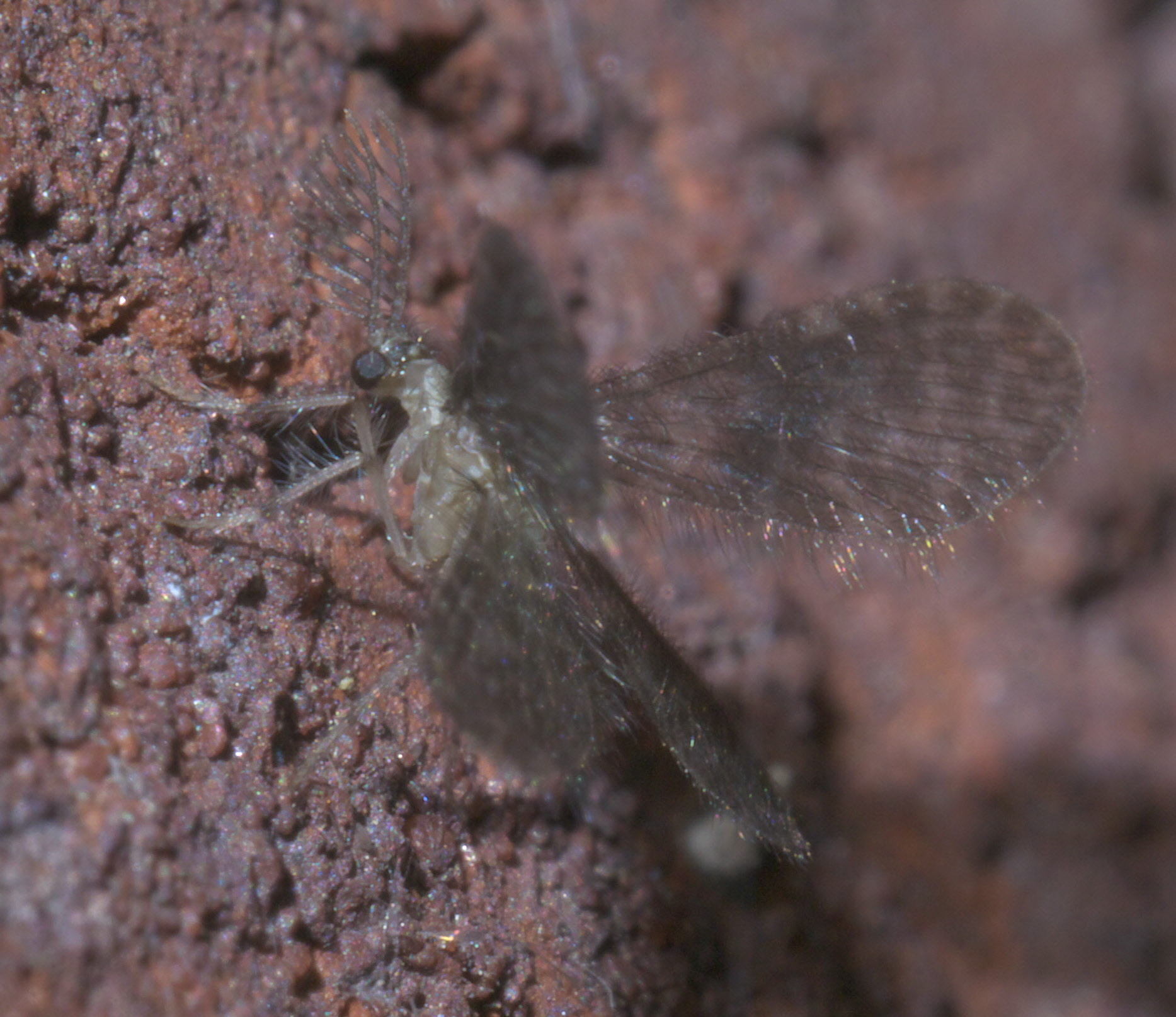
Nallachius americanus

== Species ==
These 22 species belong to the genus Nallachius:

- Nallachius adamsi Penny, 1982
- Nallachius americanus (McLachlan, 1881)
- Nallachius bruchi Navás, 1923
- Nallachius championi (Navás, 1914)
- Nallachius dicolor Adams, 1970
- Nallachius furcatus Pires Machado & Rafael, 2010
- Nallachius hermosa (Banks, 1913)
- Nallachius infuscatus Penny, 1982
- Nallachius krooni Minter, 1986
- Nallachius limai Adams, 1970
- Nallachius loxanus Navás, 1911
- Nallachius maculatus Penny, 1982
- Nallachius martosi Monserrat, 2005
- Nallachius ovalis Adams, 1970
- Nallachius parkeri Penny, 1994
- Nallachius phantomellus Adams, 1970
- Nallachius ponomarenkoi Zakharenko, 1991
- Nallachius potiguar Pires Machado & Rafael, 2010
- Nallachius prestoni (McLachlan, 1880)
- Nallachius pulchellus (Banks, 1938)
- Nallachius pupillus (Navás, 1930)
- Nallachius reductus Carpenter, 1947
