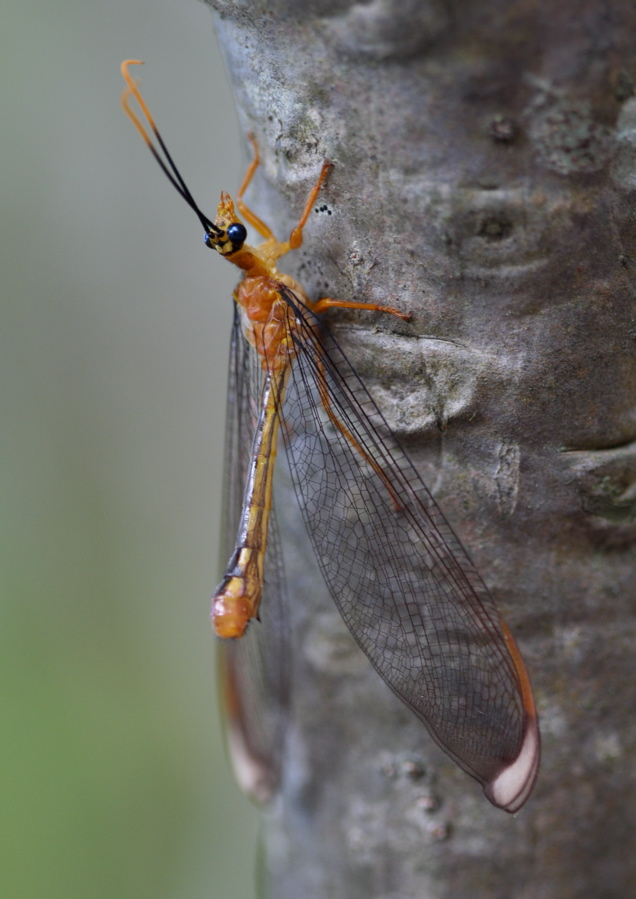
- Nymphes myrmeleonides

Scientific classification
- Domain: Eukaryota
- Kingdom: Animalia
- Phylum: Arthropoda
- Class: Insecta
- Order: Neuroptera
- Family: Nymphidae
- Genus: Nymphes; Leach, 1814

Species
- See text

= Nymphes =

Genus of lacewings

Nymphes is an Australian lacewing genus in the family Nymphidae.

== Species ==
- Nymphes aperta
- Nymphes modesta
- Nymphes myrmeleonides
- Nymphes nigrescens
- Nymphes paramyrmeleonides
- †Nymphes georgei
