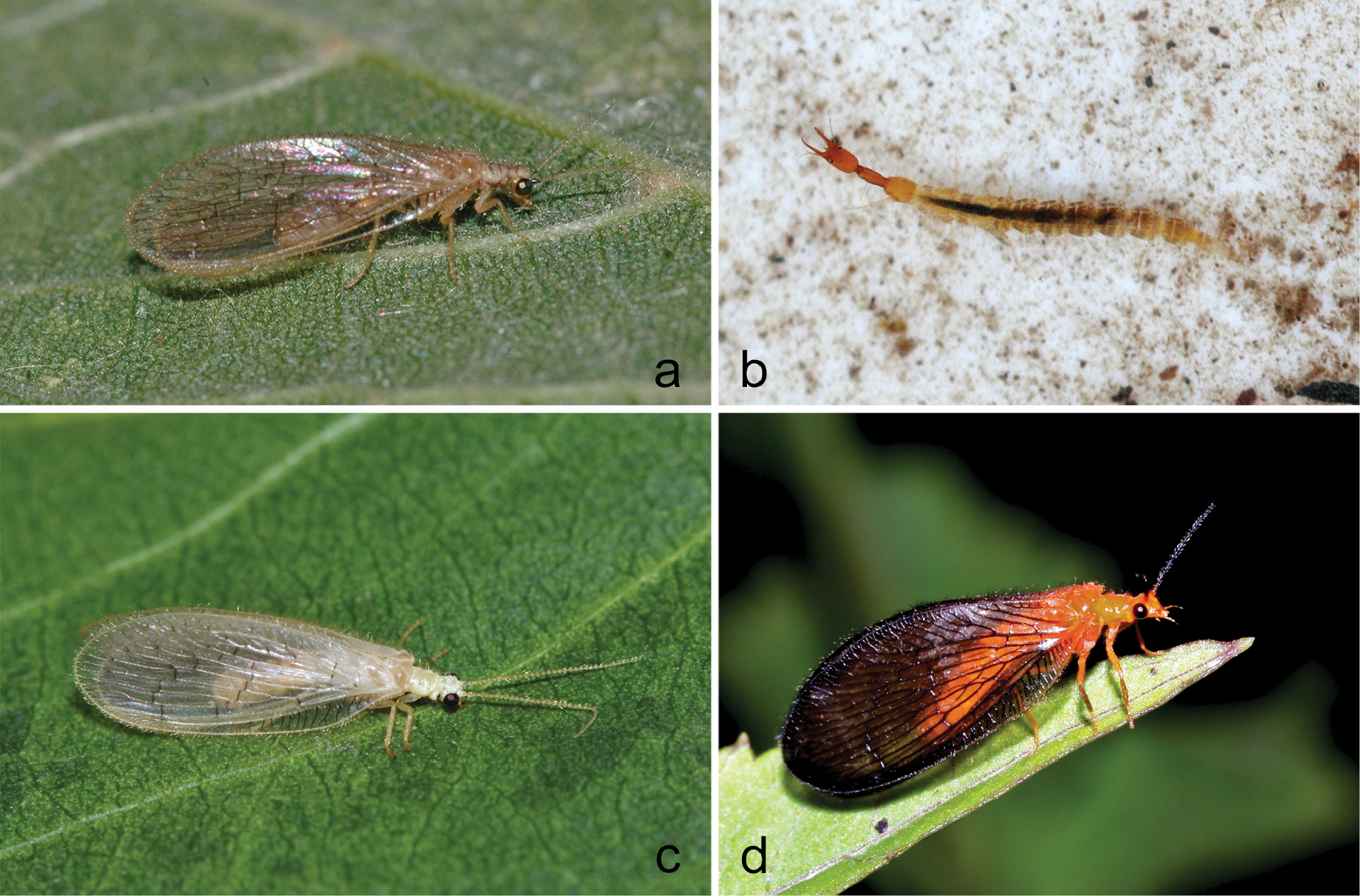
- Nevrorthus apatelios (top), adult (left) and larva (right); Nipponeurorthus fuscinervis (bottom left); Sinoneurorthus yunnanicus (bottom right)

Scientific classification
- Kingdom: Animalia
- Phylum: Arthropoda
- Clade: Pancrustacea
- Class: Insecta
- Order: Neuroptera
- Superfamily: Osmyloidea
- Family: Nevrorthidae; Nakahara, 1915

Genera
- Austroneurorthus; Nevrorthus; Nipponeurorthus; Sinoneurorthus

Synonyms
- Neurorthidae (lapsus); Nevrorthiformia

= Nevrorthidae =

Nevrorthidae Temporal range: Middle Jurassic–recent

Family of insects

The Nevrorthidae (often incorrectly spelled "Neurorthidae") are a small family of lacewings in the order Neuroptera. There are 19 extant species in four genera, with a geographically disjunct distribution: Nevrorthus, comprising 5 species with scattered distributions around the Mediterranean; Austroneurorthus, with two species known from southeastern Australia; Nipponeurorthus, comprising 11 species known from China and Japan; and Sinoneurorthus, known from a single species described from Yunnan Province, China. They are traditionally placed in the Osmyloidea, alongside Osmylidae and the spongillaflies (Sisyridae), but some research has considered them to be the sister group to the rest of Neuroptera. The larvae have unique straight jaws that are curved at the tips, and live as unspecialised predators in the sandy bottom sediments of clear, fast flowing mountain rivers and streams. They pupate underwater on the underside of stones. The adults are likely predators or feed on honeydew and other sugar-rich fluids.

Apart from the mere four living genera, several species are known from fossils, the oldest being a larva from the Middle Jurassic of China, which already shows aquatic adaptations typical of modern nevorthid larvae.

== Taxonomy ==
After

- Nevrorthus Costa, 1863
  - Nevrorthus apatelios H. Aspöck, U. Aspöck & Hölzel, 1977 Balkans, Italy
  - Nevrorthus fallax (Rambur, 1842) Sardinia and Corsica
  - Nevrorthus hannibal U. Aspöck & H. Aspöck, 1983 Tunisia, Algeria
  - Nevrorthus iridipennis Costa, 1863 Calabria, Sicily
  - Nevrorthus reconditus Monserrat & Gavira, 2014 Malaga, Spain
- Genus Austroneurorthus Nakahara, 1958
  - Austroneurorthus brunneipennis (Esben-Petersen, 1929) New South Wales, Queensland, Australia
  - Austroneurorthus horstaspoecki U. Aspöck, 2004 Victoria, New South Wales, Australia
- Genus Nipponeurorthus Nakahara, 1958
  - Nipponeurorthus damingshanicus Liu, H. Aspöck & U. Aspöck, 2014 Guangxi, China
  - Nipponeurorthus fasciatus Nakahara, 1958 China (Taiwan)
  - Nipponeurorthus flinti U. Aspöck & H. Aspöck, 2008 Japan (Okinawa, Amamioshima).
  - Nipponeurorthus furcatus Liu, H. Aspöck & U. Aspöck, 2014 China (Yunnan)
  - Nipponeurorthus fuscinervis (Nakahara, 1915) Japan (Hokkaido, Honshu)
  - Nipponeurorthus multilineatus Nakahara, 1966 China (Taiwan).
  - Nipponeurorthus pallidinervis Nakahara, 1958 Japan (Hokkaido, Honshu, Kyushu, Tsushima Island).
  - Nipponeurorthus punctatus (Nakahara, 1915) Japan (Honshu, Hokkaido, Kyushu).
  - Nipponeurorthus qinicus Yang in Chen, 1998 China (Shaanxi).
  - Nipponeurorthus tianmushanus Yang & Gao, 2001 China (Zhejiang).
  - Nipponeurorthus tinctipennis Nakahara, 1958 Japan (Yakushima Island).
- Genus Sinoneurorthus Liu, H. Aspöck & U. Aspöck, 2012
  - Sinoneurorthus yunnanicus Liu, H. Aspöck & U. Aspöck, 2012, Yunnan, China

=== Extinct genera ===
- †Balticoneurorthus Wichard 2016 Baltic amber, Eocene
- †Cretarophalis Wichard 2017 Burmese amber, Myanmar, Late Cretaceous (Cenomanian)
- †Sisyroneurorthus Nakamine et al. 2023 Burmese amber, Myanmar, Late Cretaceous (Cenomanian)
- †Electroneurorthus Wichard et al. 2010 Baltic amber, Eocene
- †Girafficervix Du, Niu & Bao, 2023 Daohugou Bed, China, Middle Jurassic
- †Palaeoneurorthus Wichard 2009 Baltic amber, Eocene
- †Rophalis Pictet 1854 Baltic amber, Rovno amber, Eocene
