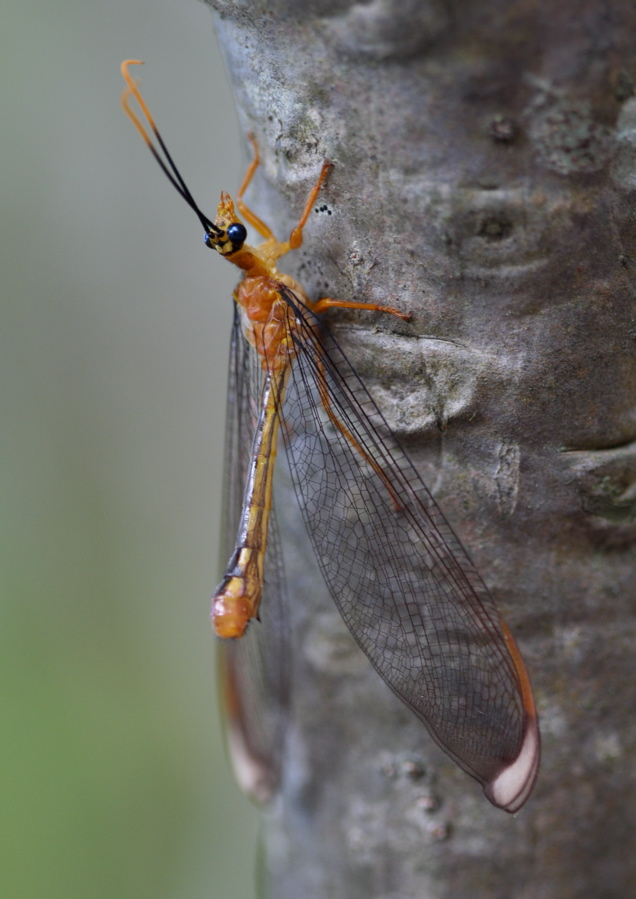

Scientific classification
- Kingdom: Animalia
- Phylum: Arthropoda
- Clade: Pancrustacea
- Class: Insecta
- Order: Neuroptera
- Family: Nymphidae
- Genus: Nymphes
- Species: N. myrmeleonides

Binomial name
- Nymphes myrmeleonides Leach, 1814

= Nymphes myrmeleonides =

Species of lacewing

Nymphes myrmeleonides is an Australian insect in the order Neuroptera, also known as the blue eyes lacewing. It is found in areas of New South Wales and Queensland. The species have a body length of up to 4 centimetres (1.6 in) and a wingspan of up to 11 cm (4.3 in), each wing ending in a white tip. The larvae of N. myrmeleonides resemble antlions and construct pit traps by burrowing into loose soil.
