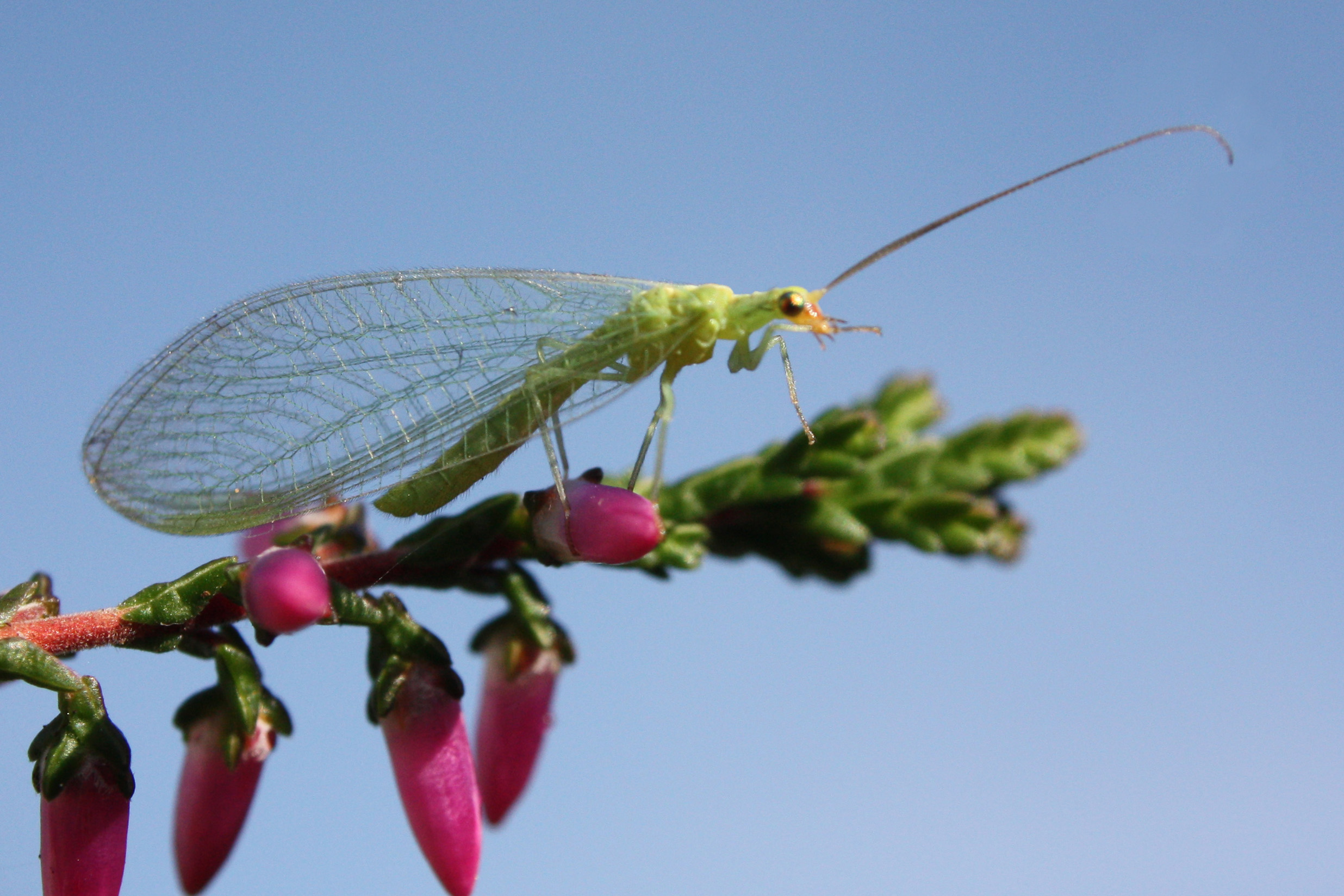
- Green lacewing

Scientific classification
- Kingdom: Animalia
- Phylum: Arthropoda
- Clade: Pancrustacea
- Class: Insecta
- Order: Neuroptera
- Superfamily: Chrysopoidea

Families
- Chrysopidae; †Ascalochrysidae; †Mesochrysopidae

= Chrysopoidea =

Superfamily of insects

Chrysopoidea is a lacewing superfamily in the suborder Hemerobiiformia.
