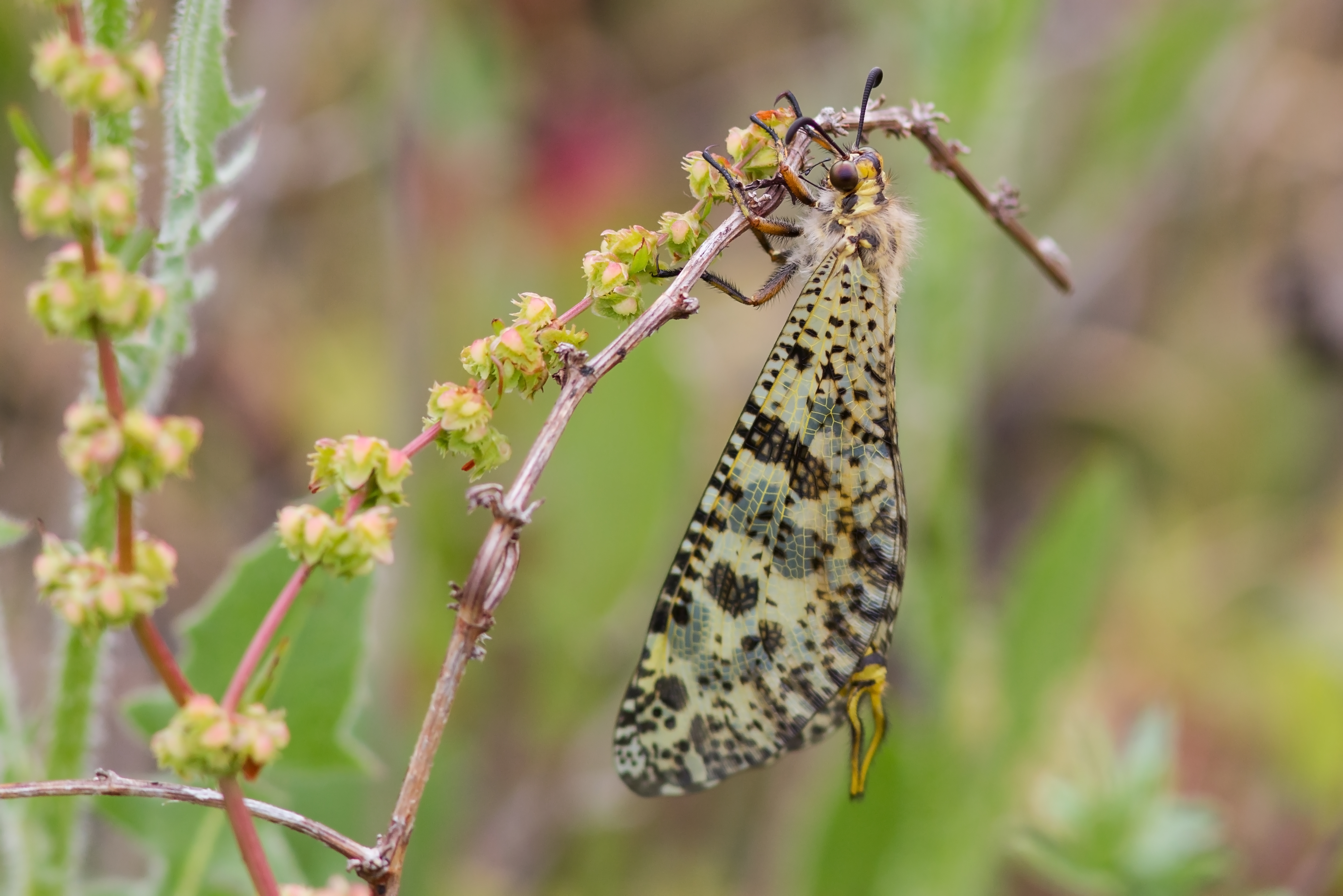
- Palpares libelluloides

Scientific classification
- Kingdom: Animalia
- Phylum: Arthropoda
- Class: Insecta
- Order: Neuroptera
- Clade: Myrmeleontiformia
- Superfamily: Myrmeleontoidea

Families
- Ascalaphidae; †Babinskaiidae; †Cratosmylidae; Myrmeleontidae; Nemopteridae; Nymphidae; †Rafaelianidae

= Myrmeleontoidea =

Superfamily of insects

Myrmeleontoidea is a neuropteran superfamily in the clade Myrmeleontiformia. The following families are included:

Superfamily Myrmeleontoidea (syn Nemopteroidea)

- Family Ascalaphidae: owlflies (included in Myrmeleontidae in some classifications)
- Family †Babinskaiidae
- Family †Cratosmylidae (includes Cratosmylus and Araripenymphes)
- Family Myrmeleontidae: antlions (includes Palaeoleontidae)
- Family Nemopteridae: spoonwings
- Family Nymphidae: split-footed lacewings (including Myiodactylidae)
- Family †Rafaelianidae
