= Mesochrysopidae =

Mesochrysopidae Temporal range: Toarcian–Cenomanian

Scientific classification
- Kingdom: Animalia
- Phylum: Arthropoda
- Class: Insecta
- Order: Neuroptera
- Superfamily: Chrysopoidea
- Family: †Mesochrysopidae; Handlirsch 1906

Genera
- See text

Extinct family of insects

Mesochrysopidae is an extinct family of lacewings known from the Jurassic and Cretaceous periods. They are considered to be closely related to green lacewings of the family Chrysopidae. The family are also alternatively considered a paraphyletic grade leading up to crown group Chrysopidae.

== Genera ==
- †Allopterus Zhang 1991 Las Hoyas, Spain, Early Cretaceous (Barremian) Laiyang Formation, China, Early Cretaceous (Aptian)
- †Burmotachinymphes Cao, Wang and Liu, 2021, Burmese amber, Myanmar, Late Cretaceous (Cenomanian_
- †Aristenymphes Panfilov 1980 Karabastau Formation, Kazakhstan, Middle-Late Jurassic (Callovian/Oxfordian)
- †Caririchrysa Martins-Neto and Vulcano 1988 Crato Formation, Brazil, Aptian
- †Chimerochrysopa Nel et al. 2005 Las Hoyas, Spain, Barremian
- †Dryellina Martins-Neto and Rodrigues 2009 Crato Formation, Brazil, Aptian
- †Karenina Martins-Neto 1997 Crato Formation, Brazil, Aptian
- †Kareninoides Yang et al. 2012 Las Hoyas, Spain, Barremian, Yixian Formation, China, Aptian
- †Longicellochrysa Ren et al. 2010 Yixian Formation, China, Aptian
- †Macronympha Panfilov 1980 Karabastau Formation, Kazakhstan, Callovian/Oxfordian
- †Mesascalaphus Ren 1995 Yixian Formation, China, Aptian
- †Mesochrysopa Handlirsch 1906 Solnhofen Limestone, Germany, Late Jurassic (Tithonian)
- †Mesotermes Haase 1890 Solnhofen Limestone, Germany, Tithonian
- †Nanochrysopa Nel et al. 2005 Las Hoyas, Spain, Barremian
- †Pedanoptera Liu et al. 2016 Burmese amber, Myanmar, Cenomanian
- †Protoaristenymphes Nel and Henrotay 1994 Bascharage, Luxembourg, Toarcian Daohugou, China, Callovian
- †Tachinymphes Ponomarenko 1992 Las Hoyas, Spain, Barremian, Yixian Formation, China, Aptian, Zaza Formation, Russia, Aptian Jinju Formation, South Korea, Early Cretaceous (Albian)
- †Triangulochrysopa Nel et al. 2005 Las Hoyas, Spain, Barremian Crato Formation, Brazil, Aptian
