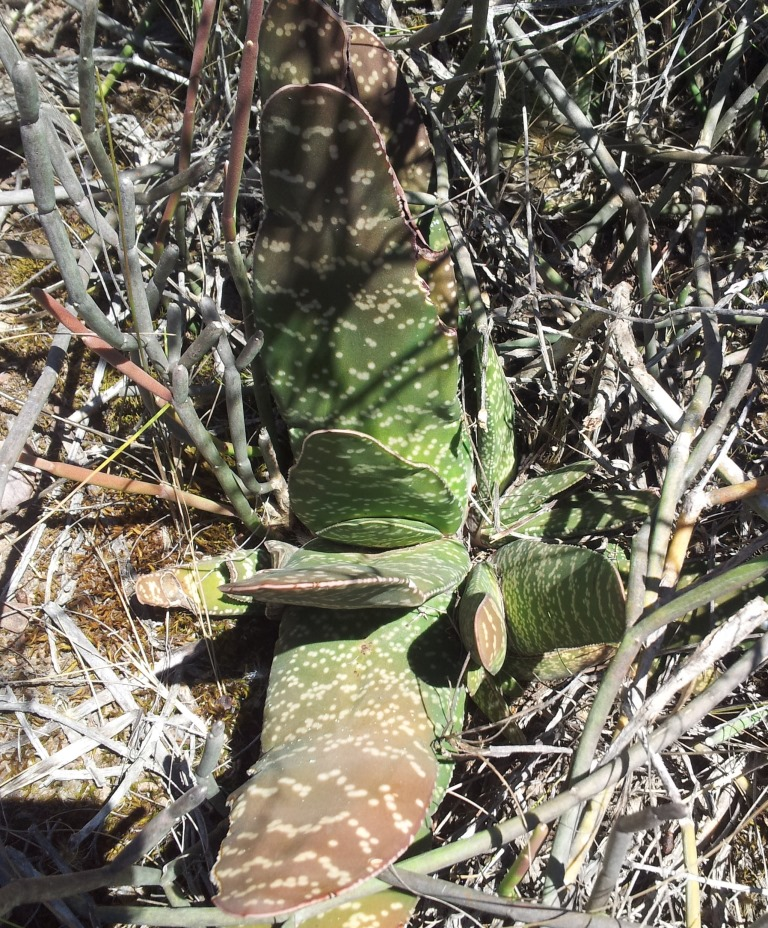
- Gasteria disticha in habitat

Scientific classification
- Kingdom: Plantae
- Clade: Tracheophytes
- Clade: Angiosperms
- Clade: Monocots
- Order: Asparagales
- Family: Asphodelaceae
- Subfamily: Asphodeloideae
- Genus: Gasteria
- Species: G. disticha

Binomial name
- Gasteria disticha (L.) Haw.

= Gasteria disticha =

Species of succulent

Gasteria disticha is succulent plant native to the Western Cape, South Africa.

== Description ==
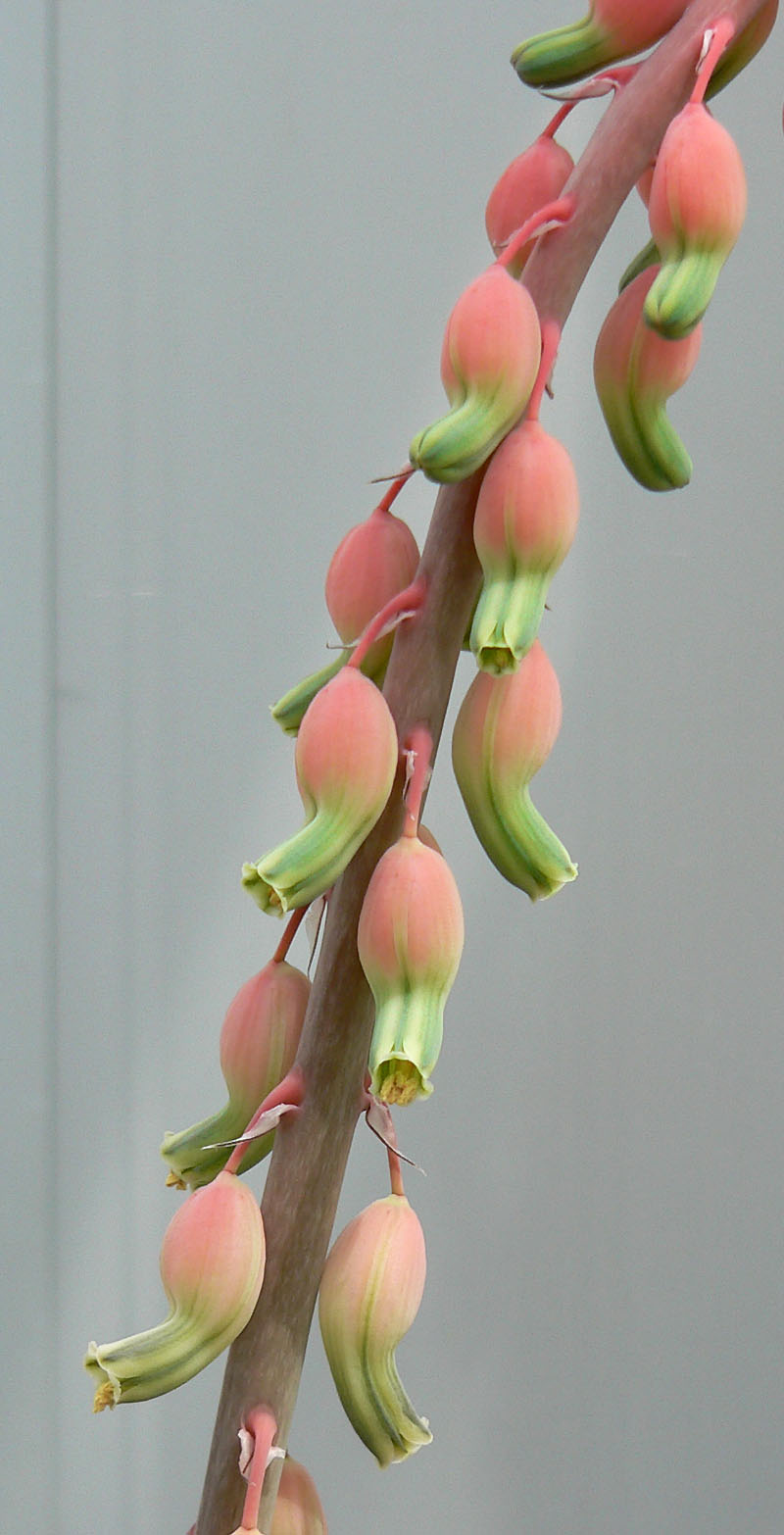
Gasteria disticha flowers.

This species of Gasteria has its strap-shaped leaves in two opposite rows (distichous), from whence its Latin species name comes. In its vegetative appearance, it looks very similar to the closely related species Gasteria pillansii to the north, and Gasteria brachyphylla to the south-east, both of which are also distichous.

However, the flowers are different, with G. disticha having tiny flowers of just 12–20 mm which have flower bases that are inflated or swollen for roughly two-thirds of the flower length. G. disticha often has leaves that undulate slightly, with wavy margins and a rough, mat surface.

It is proliferous, with pink flowers and appears between September and December.

== Distribution ==
It occurs in the Robertson Karoo vegetation of the Breede River Valley in the Western Cape, South Africa. It also extends marginally into the verges of the Great Karoo.

In its natural habitat, it is typically found under rocks or bushes that provide it with some shelter from the sun.

== Varieties ==
- G. disticha var. disticha - the type variety, and also the most widely distributed
- G. disticha var. langebergensis - dwarf variety from Langvlei, between Worcester and Robertson, with thinner leaves with toothed margins.
- G. disticha var. robusta - outlying summer rainfall variety from Beaufort West, with short, fat, robust leaves, and summer flowers.
