= Dipteromantispidae =

Dipteromantispidae Temporal range: Aptian–Turonian
- Halteriomantispa grimaldii

Scientific classification
- Kingdom: Animalia
- Phylum: Arthropoda
- Class: Insecta
- Order: Neuroptera
- Superfamily: Mantispoidea
- Family: †Dipteromantispidae; Makarkin et al. 2013

Genera
- See text

Extinct family of insects

Dipteromantispidae is an extinct family of neuropterans known from the Cretaceous period. Unlike other neuropterans, the family possesses only a single set of fully developed forewings, with the hindwings reduced to haltere-like structures. They are generally small in size (forewing length 2.6-7.9 mm) and possess raptorial forelegs. They are considered to belong to Mantispoidea, with an uncertain position within the clade. Some authors have suggested that they represent a subgroup of Mantispidae, and should instead be referred to as the subfamily Dipteromantispinae within that family.

== Taxonomy ==
- †Burmodipteromantispa Liu et al. 2016
  - †Burmodipteromantispa jiaxiaoae Liu et al. 2016 Burmese amber, Myanmar, Cenomanian
- †Enigmadipteromantispa Azar et al. 2020
  - †Enigmadipteromantispa dimyi Azar et al. 2020 Burmese amber, Myanmar, Cenomanian
- †Dipteromantispa Makarkin et al. 2013
  - †Dipteromantispa brevisubcosta Makarkin et al. 2013 Yixian Formation, China, Aptian
- †Halteriomantispa Liu et al. 2016
  - †Halteriomantispa grimaldii Liu et al. 2016 Burmese amber, Myanmar, Cenomanian
- †Jersimantispa Liu et al. 2016
  - †Jersimantispa henryi Grimaldi 2000 (Formerly Mantispidiptera henryi) New Jersey amber, Turonian
- †Kurtodipteromantispa Li & Liu, 2020 Burmese amber, Myanmar, Cenomanian
  - †Kurtodipteromantispa xiai Li et al., 2020
  - †Kurtodipteromantispa zhuodei Li & Liu, 2020
- †Mantispidiptera Grimaldi 2000
  - †Mantispidiptera enigmatica Grimaldi 2000 New Jersey amber, Turonian
- †Mantispidipterella Liu et al. 2016
  - †Mantispidipterella longissima Liu et al. 2016 Burmese amber, Myanmar, Cenomanian
- †Paradipteromantispa Li et al., 2020
  - †Paradipteromantispa polyneura Li et al., 2020 Burmese amber, Myanmar, Cenomanian
