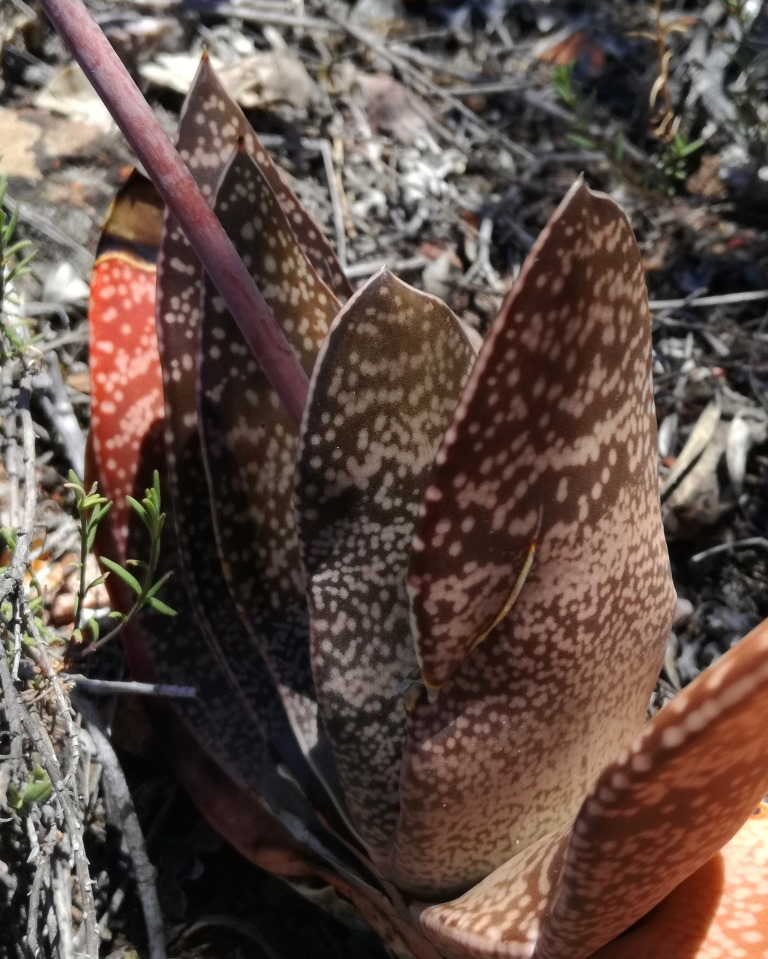
- Gasteria brachyphylla in habitat, near Zoar

Scientific classification
- Kingdom: Plantae
- Clade: Tracheophytes
- Clade: Angiosperms
- Clade: Monocots
- Order: Asparagales
- Family: Asphodelaceae
- Subfamily: Asphodeloideae
- Genus: Gasteria
- Species: G. brachyphylla

Binomial name
- Gasteria brachyphylla (L.) Haw.

= Gasteria brachyphylla =

Species of succulent

Gasteria brachyphylla, the Klein Karoo gasteria, is succulent plant native to the Western Cape, South Africa.

== Description ==
This species of Gasteria has its strap-shaped leaves in two opposite rows (distichous). Its flowers are 12–22 mm long. It very closely resembles its two relatives, Gasteria pillansii and Gasteria disticha to the north, both of which are also distichous.

However G. brachyphylla can be distinguished by its very shiny, smooth leaves (its two relatives' leaves are rough with tiny tubercles). "Brachyphylla" means "wide/short leaves", and this species's leaves are shorter than its relatives'.

It is proliferous, and has pink flowers which appear around September.

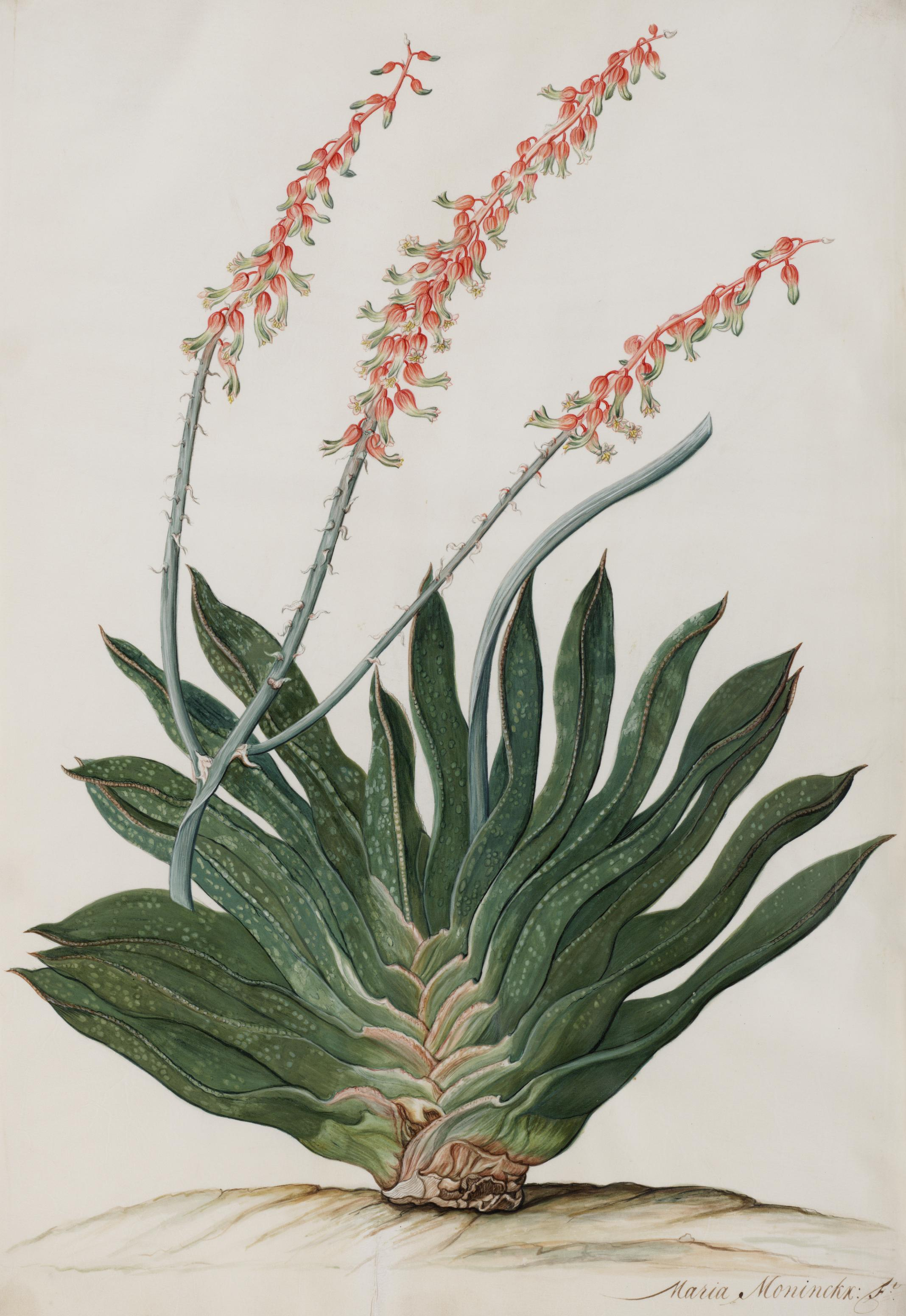
Botanical sketch by Maria Moninckx

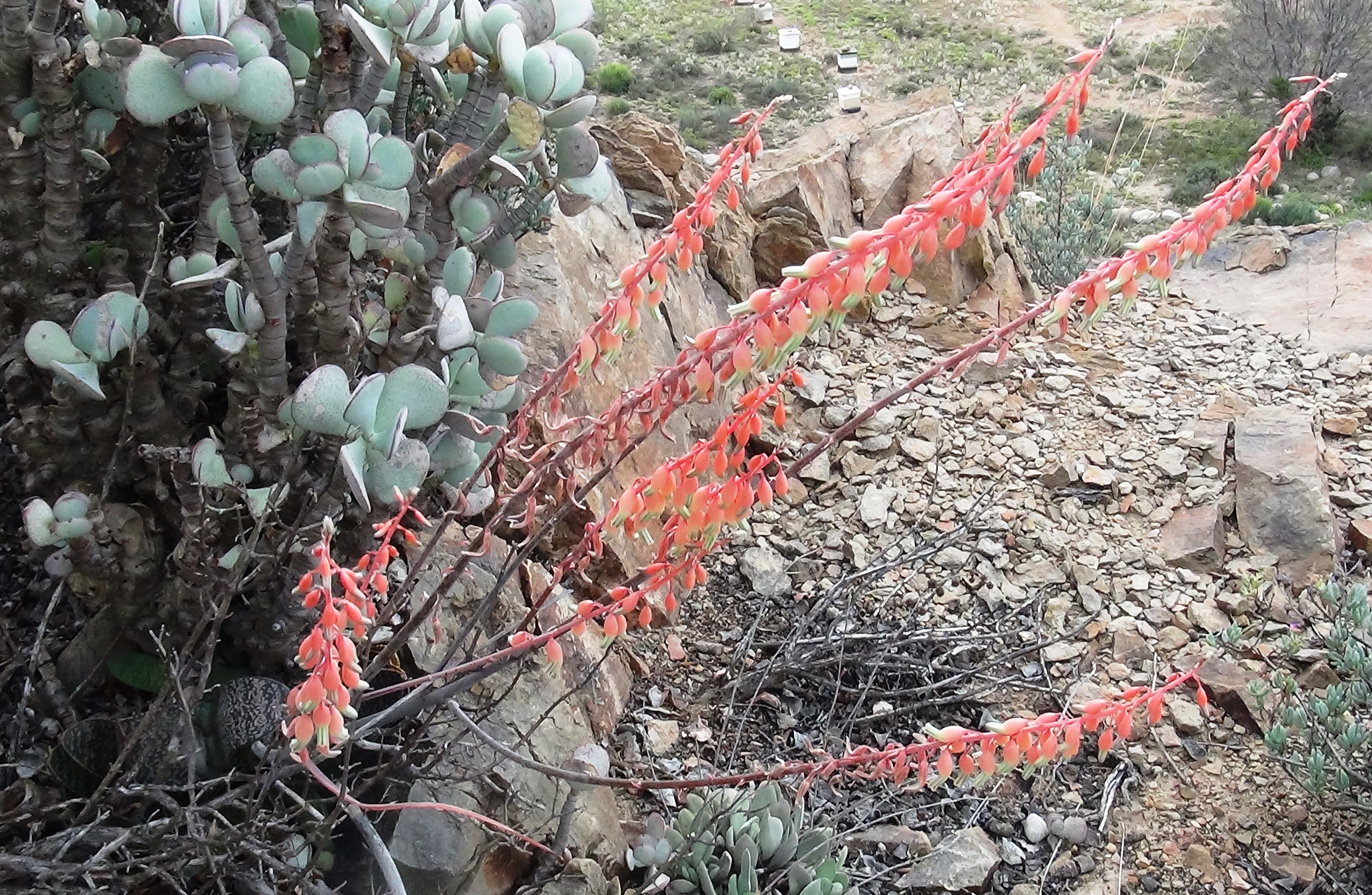
Inflorescence, growing west of Ladismith

== Distribution ==
It occurs under shrubs in the Succulent Karoo vegetation of the Little Karoo in the Western Cape, South Africa. It is found as far west as Barrydale, and as far east as Uniondale.
