= Neliana =

Neliana may refer to:

- Neliana Tersigni
- Gasteria neliana
