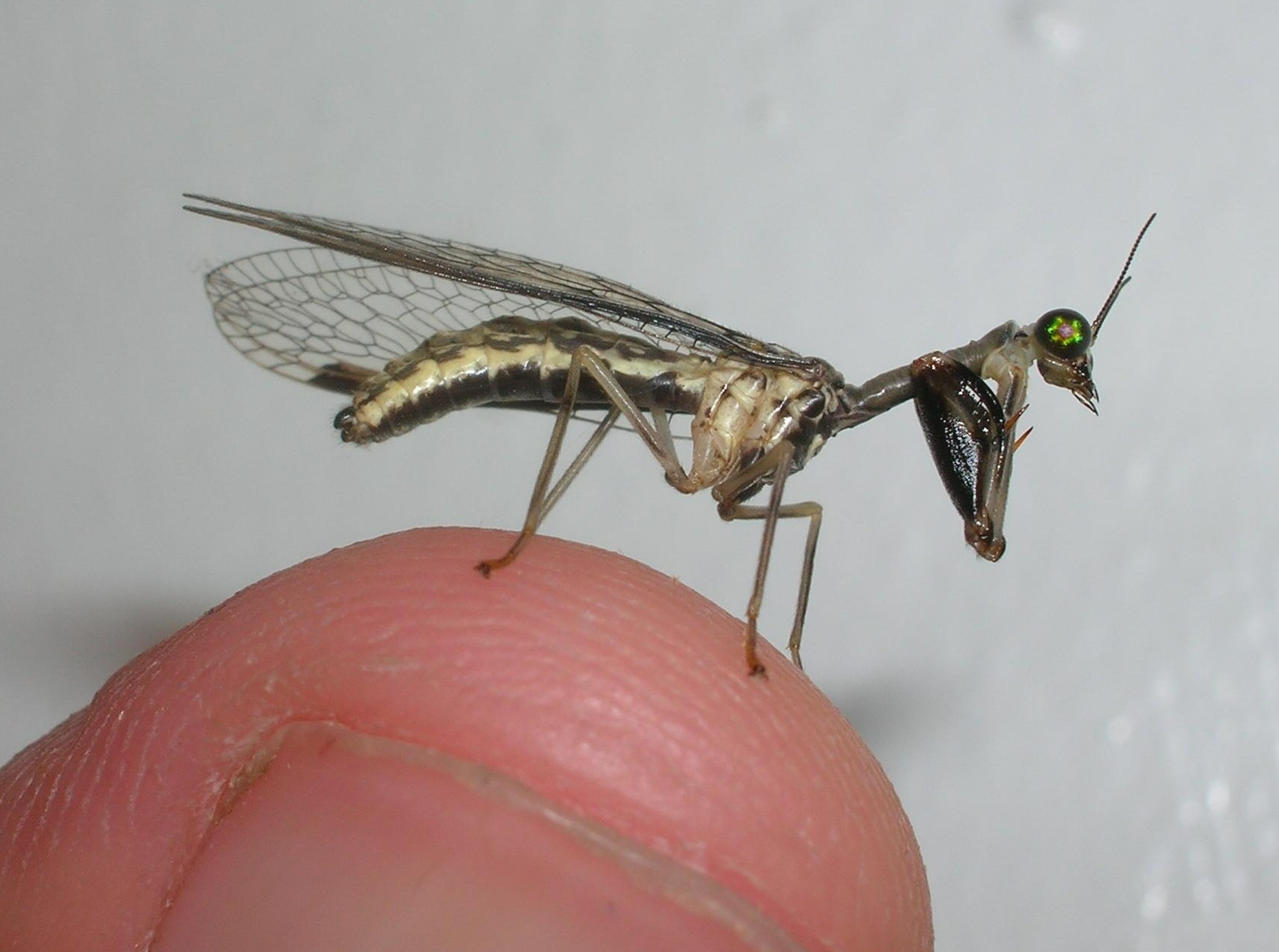
- Mantidfly

Scientific classification
- Domain: Eukaryota
- Kingdom: Animalia
- Phylum: Arthropoda
- Class: Insecta
- Order: Neuroptera
- Clade: Euneuroptera
- Superfamily: Mantispoidea (Leach 1815)

Families
- Berothidae; †Dipteromantispidae; Mantispidae; †Mesoberothidae; Rhachiberothidae

= Mantispoidea =

Mantispoidea Temporal range: Late Triassic–Present

Superfamily of insects

Mantispoidea is a superfamily of euneuropteran insects in the order Neuroptera. The group was formerly placed in the paraphyletic suborder Hemerobiiformia, but is now considered sister to the superfamilies Dilaroidea and Osmyloidea. Mantispoidea contains three living families and one extinct family described from the fossil record.

== Taxonomy ==
- Berothidae (Late Jurassic–Present)
- Mantispidae (Jurassic–Present)
- †Dipteromantispidae (Cretaceous) (possibly nested within Mantispidae)
- †Mesoberothidae (including †Mesithonidae) (Triassic)
- Rhachiberothidae (Early Cretaceous–Recent)
