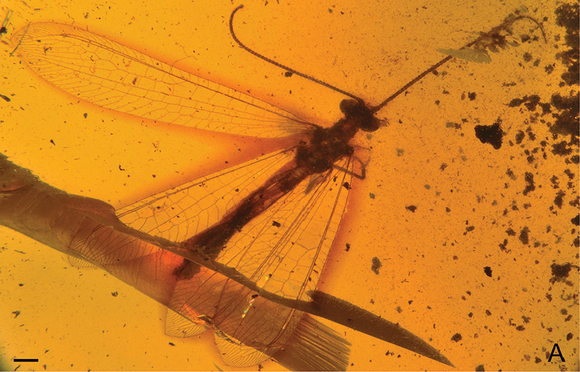
- Parababinskaia makarkini

Scientific classification
- Kingdom: Animalia
- Phylum: Arthropoda
- Clade: Pancrustacea
- Class: Insecta
- Order: Neuroptera
- Superfamily: Myrmeleontoidea
- Family: †Babinskaiidae; Martins-Neto and Vulcano 1989

Genera
- See text

= Babinskaiidae =

Babinskaiidae Temporal range: Aptian–Cenomanian

Extinct family of insects

Babinskaiidae is an extinct family of neuropterans known from the Cretaceous period of South America and Asia. They are part of the superfamily Myrmeleontoidea. Their distinguishing characters include: "long filiform antennae, narrowly elongated wings, with features such as trichosors, and presectorial cross veins present in both wings, and absence of forewing oblique vein". They are considered transitional between Nymphidae and more derived myrmeleontodoids, such as antlions.

== Genera ==
- †Babinskaia Martins-Neto and Vulcano 1989 Crato Formation, Brazil, Aptian
  - †Babinskaia formosa Martins-Neto and Vulcano 1989
  - †Babinskaia pulchra Martins-Neto and Vulcano 1989
- †Baisonelia Ponomarenko, 1992 Zaza Formation, Russia, Aptian
  - †Baisonelia vitimica Ponomarenko 1992
- †Burmobabinskaia Lu et al. 2016 Burmese amber, Myanmar, Cenomanian
  - †Burmobabinskaia tenuis Lu et al. 2016
- †Electrobabinskaia Lu et al. 2016 Burmese amber, Myanmar, Cenomanian
  - †Electrobabinskaia burmana Lu et al. 2016
- †Gigantobabinskaia Makarkin and Staniczek 2019 Burmese amber, Myanmar, Cenomanian
  - †Gigantobabinskaia godunkoi Makarkin and Staniczek 2019
- †Neliana (replaced Nelia Martins-Neto and Vulcano 1989) Martins-Neto 1992 Crato Formation, Brazil, Aptian
  - †Neliana impolluta Martins-Neto 1997
  - †Neliana maculata Martins-Neto and Vulcano 1989
- †Parababinskaia Makarkin et al. 2017
  - †Parababinskaia douteaui Ngô-Muller et al. 2020 Burmese amber, Myanmar, Cenomanian
  - †Parababinskaia elegans Makarkin et al. 2017 Crato Formation, Brazil, Aptian
  - †Parababinskaia makarkini Hu et al. 2018 Burmese amber, Myanmar, Cenomanian
- †Paraneliana Jouault & Nel, 2021
  - †Paraneliana sennlaubi Jouault & Nel, 2021 Crato Formation, Brazil, Aptian
- †Pseudobabinskaia Makarkin et al. 2017 Burmese amber, Myanmar, Cenomanian
  - †Pseudobabinskaia martinsnetoi Lu et al. 2016 (formerly Babinskaia martinsnetoi)
- †Pseudoneliana Huang et al. 2019 Burmese amber, Myanmar, Cenomanian
  - †Pseudoneliana makarkini Huang et al. 2019
- †Calobabinskaia Lu, Wang & Liu, 2021
  - †Calobabinskaia xiai Lu, Wang & Liu, 2021 Burmese amber, Myanmar, Cenomanian
- †Stenobabinskaia Lu, Wang & Liu, 2021
  - †Stenobabinskaia punctata Lu, Wang & Liu, 2021 Burmese amber, Myanmar, Cenomanian
- †Xiaobabinskaia Lu, Wang & Liu, 2021
  - †Xiaobabinskaia lepidotricha Lu, Wang & Liu, 2021 Burmese amber, Myanmar, Cenomanian

== Gallery ==
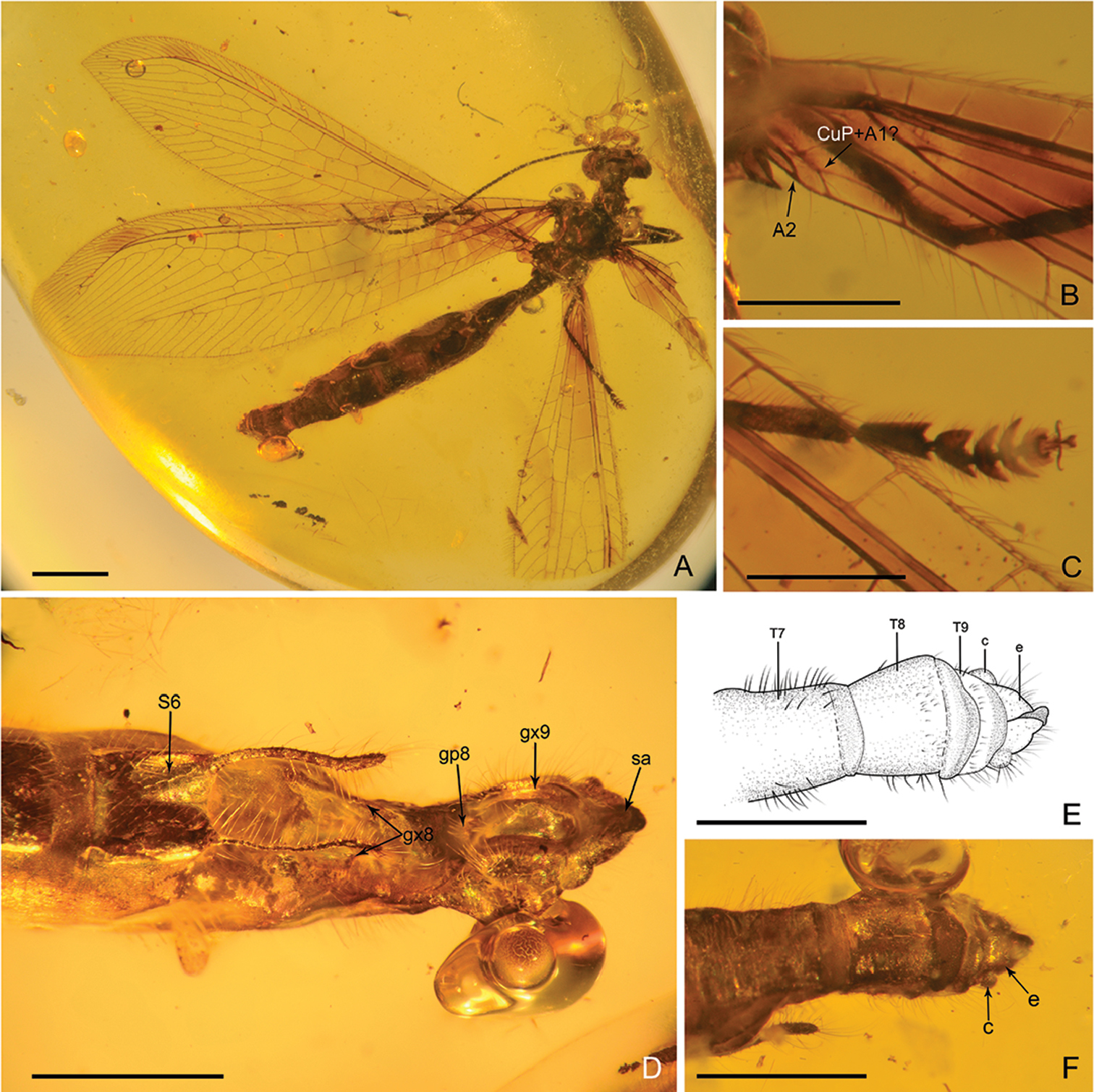
Electrobabinskaia burmana

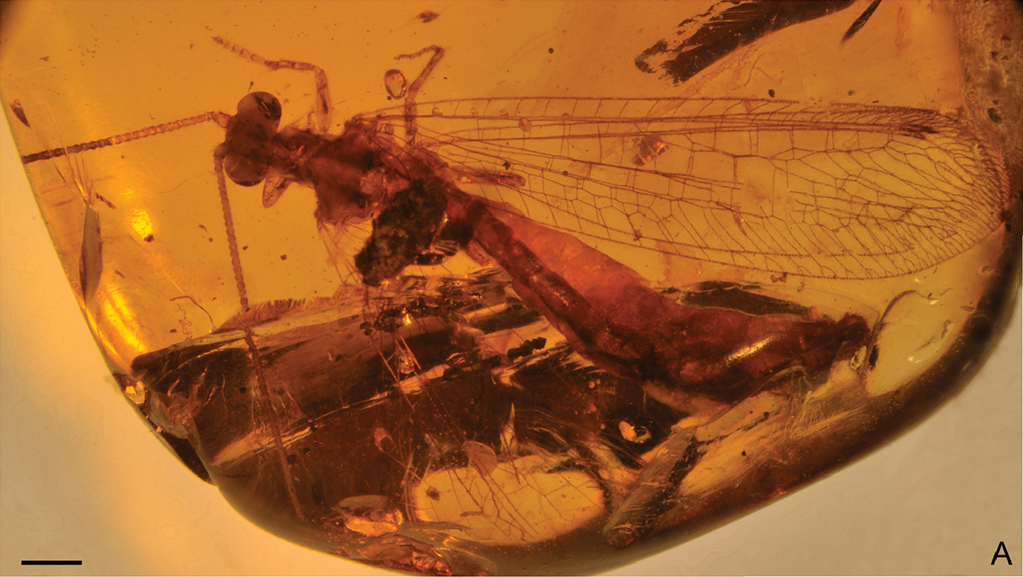
Parababinskaia makarkini
