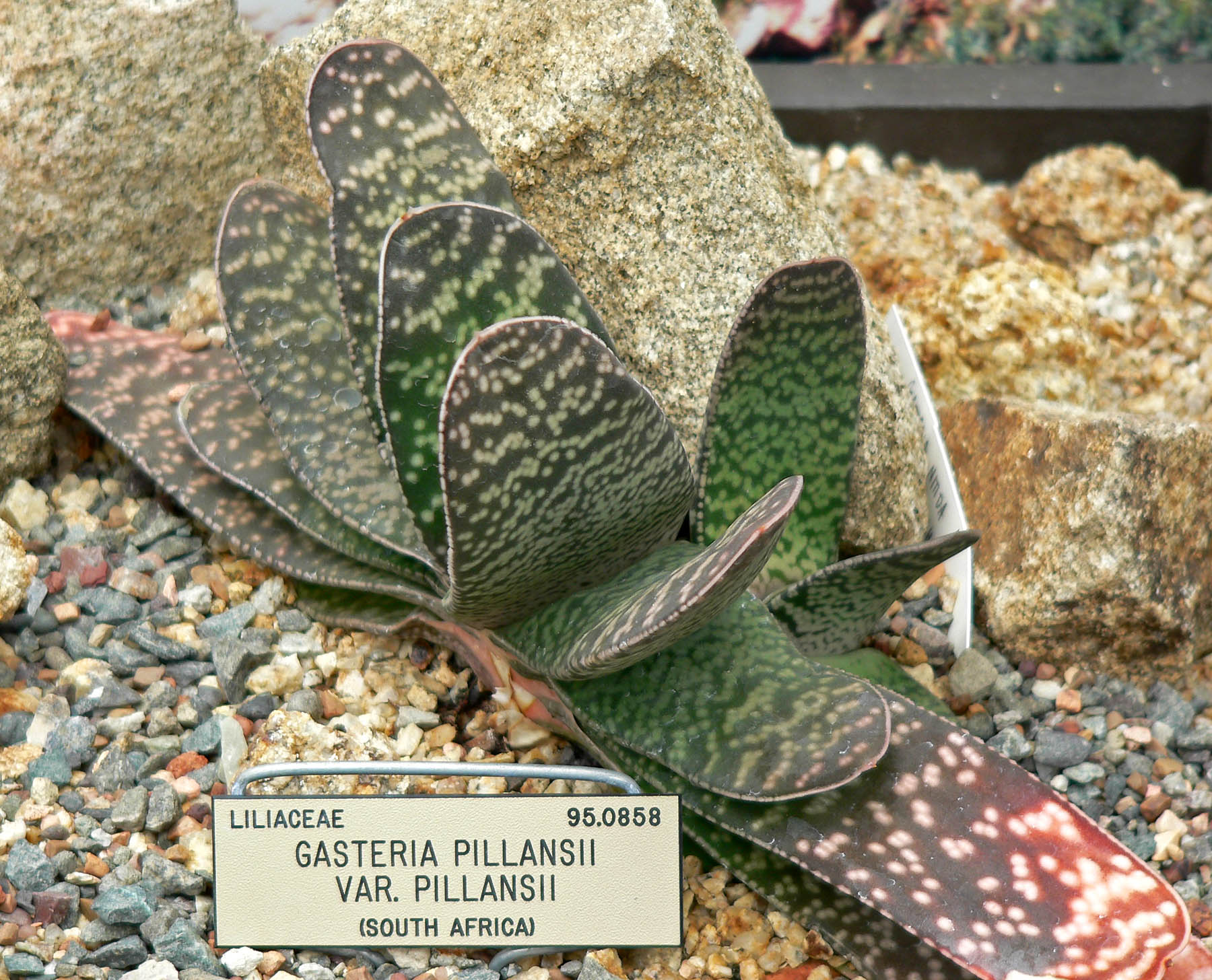
- Gasteria pillansii in cultivation

Scientific classification
- Kingdom: Plantae
- Clade: Embryophytes
- Clade: Tracheophytes
- Clade: Spermatophytes
- Clade: Angiosperms
- Clade: Monocots
- Order: Asparagales
- Family: Asphodelaceae
- Subfamily: Asphodeloideae
- Genus: Gasteria
- Species: G. pillansii

Binomial name
- Gasteria pillansii Kensit

= Gasteria pillansii =

Species of succulent

Gasteria pillansii, the Namaqua gasteria, is succulent plant native to the arid winter-rainfall regions in the far west of South Africa and Namibia.

== Description ==
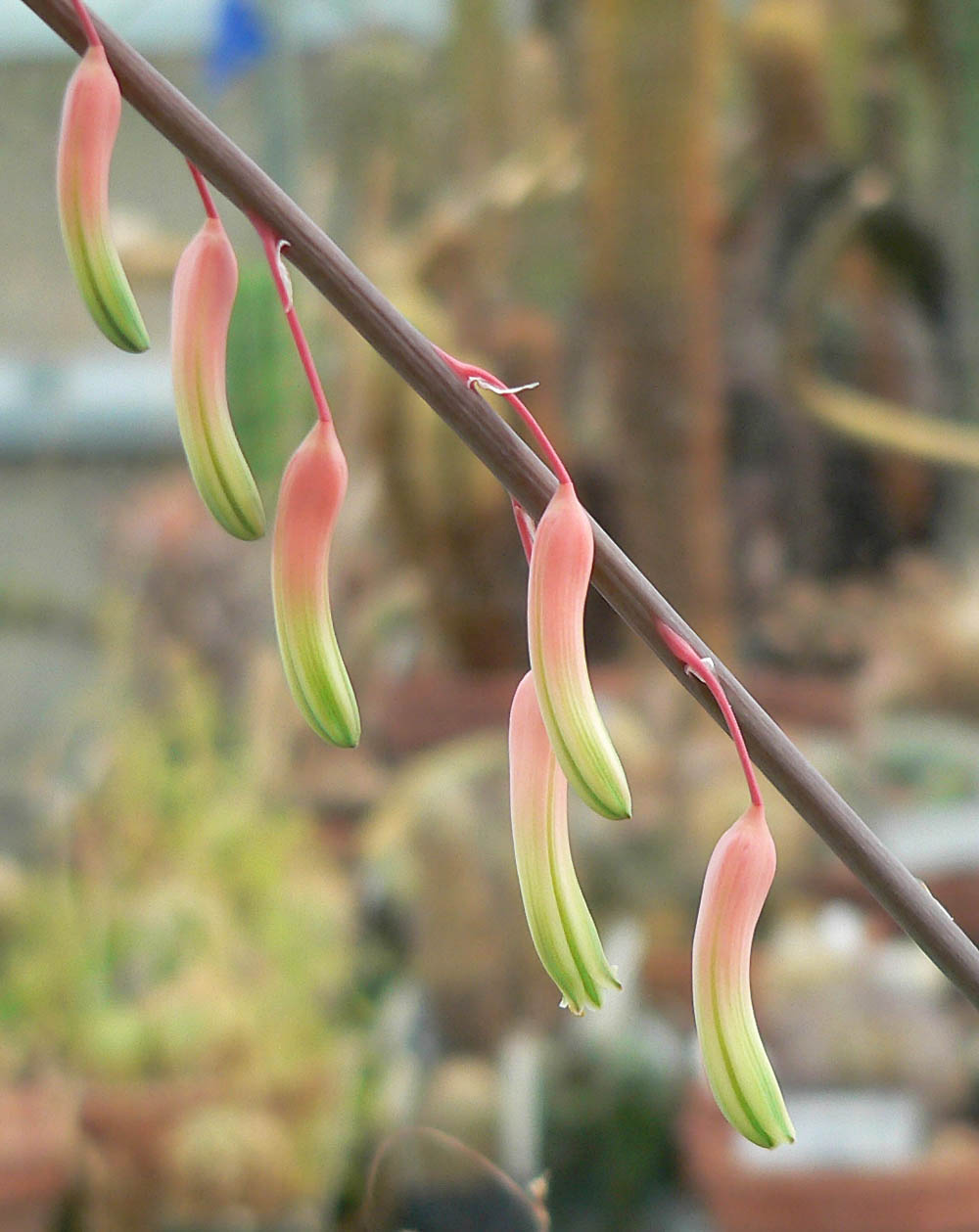
Gasteria pillansii flowers.

This species of Gasteria has its strap-shaped leaves in two opposite rows (distichous), and is very variable in its appearance, and especially in its size. Its flowers are 25–45 mm long, with only slightly swollen bases for up to one-third of the length.

In its vegetative appearance, it looks very similar to its two closest relatives, Gasteria disticha and Gasteria brachyphylla to the south, which are also distichous. However, the flowers are different, with G. disticha having smaller flowers of just 12–20 mm which have flower bases that are inflated or swollen for roughly two-thirds of the flower length.

It is proliferous, offsetting from underground stolons, and can form large clumps. It has pink flowers which appear in mid-summer around December. The seeds develop in time to be dispersed during the rains of autumn and winter.

== Distribution ==
It occurs in the arid winter rainfall region in the far west of South Africa. This is succulent Karoo vegetation, and corresponds to the Namaqualand. It also extends into the far south of Namibia.

It is the only Gasteria species to extend this far north along the west coast of southern Africa, with most of its relatives occurring along the wetter south and east coast of the subcontinent. It is also the only purely winter-rainfall species in the genus.

In its natural habitat, it is typically found under rocks or bushes that provide it with some shelter from the sun.

In cultivation it is very easy to grow, but requires a dry summer to match its natural habitat. They also require extremely well-drained sandy soil, and are prone to "Fusarium" root rot.

== Varieties ==
- G. pillansii var. pillansii - The type variety, with 200mm strap-shaped leaves. The subvariety ramkop with its broad, compact, patent leaves, is very popular as an ornamental.
- G. pillansii var. ernsti-ruschii - Variety from Namibia in the far north (Sonberg & Kuamsib) with recurved, patent, mottled leaves.
- G. pillansii var. hallii - Variety from Oograbies mountains near Port Nolloth. It has ascending, smaller leaves, and shorter flowers.
