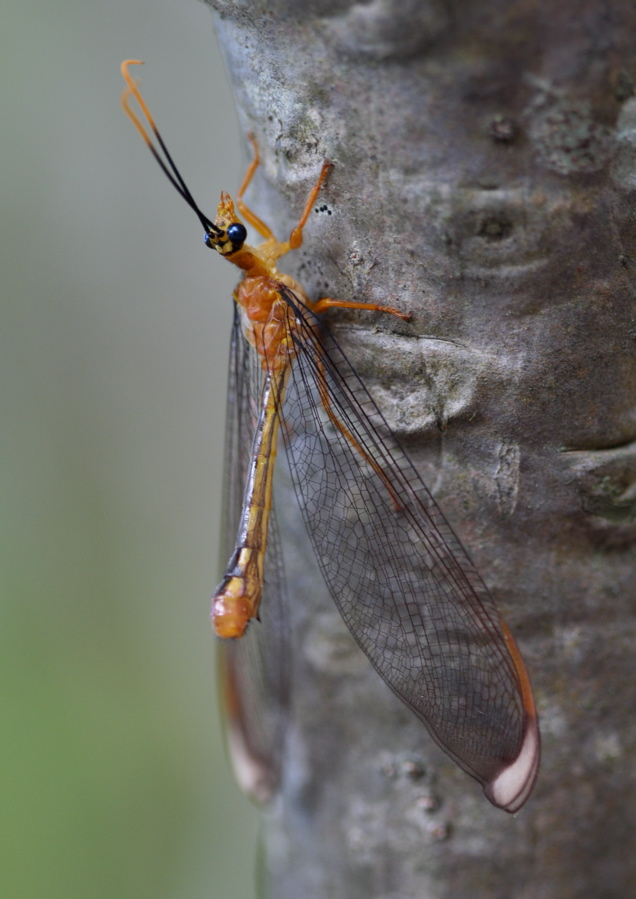
- Nymphes myrmeleonides

Scientific classification
- Kingdom: Animalia
- Phylum: Arthropoda
- Clade: Pancrustacea
- Class: Insecta
- Order: Neuroptera
- Clade: Myrmeleontiformia
- Family: Nymphidae; Rambur, 1842

Genera
- See text

Synonyms
- Myiodactylidae Handlirsch, 1908; Nymphitidae Handlirsch, 1906

= Nymphidae =

Nymphidae Temporal range: Middle Jurassic - Recent

Family of insects

Nymphidae, sometimes called split-footed lacewings, are a family of winged insects of the order Neuroptera. There are 35 extant species native to Australia and New Guinea.

== Description ==
Nymphidae stand somewhat apart from other living Myrmeleontoidea. The antlions (Myrmeleontidae) and the owlflies (Ascalaphidae) are more closely related to them, but the bulk of the Nymphidae sister groups include extinct taxa known only from fossils, such as the Nymphitidae, Osmylopsychopidae or Babinskaiidae. The spoonwings (Nemopteridae) were at one time also believed to be quite closely related, but they seem to belong to another lineage of Myrmeleontiformia altogether. The family is divided into two major subfamilies, Nymphinae and Myiodactylinae. The larvae of nymphines are similar to antlions, with relatively elongate bodies, and camouflage themselves in debris, living and hunting on the ground, while myiodactylines have wide, disc shaped bodies, and are arboreal, living on plants. The adults are thought to be predaceous and are primarily active at night, and are attracted to lights.

Fossil genera are known from Europe, Asia as well as North and South America, extending back to the Middle Jurassic.

== Genera ==
=== Extant genera ===
- Subfamily Nymphinae Rambur, 1842
  - Nymphes Leach, 1814
  - Austronymphes Esben-Petersen, 1914
  - Nesydrion Gerstaecker, 1885
- Subfamily Myiodactylinae Handlirsch, 1908
  - Myiodactylus Brauer, 1866
  - Norfolius Navás, 1922
  - Nymphydrion Banks, 1913
  - Osmylops Banks, 1913
  - Umbranymphes New, 1987

=== Extinct genera ===
- Subfamily Nymphinae Rambur, 1842
  - †Baissoleon Makarkin, 1990 - Yixian Formation, China, Zaza Formation, Russia, Early Cretaceous (Aptian)
  - †Epinesydrion Archibald & Makarkin, 2020 - Kamloops Group, Canada, Eocene (Ypresian)
  - †Nymphes? georgei Archibald et al., 2009 - Klondike Mountain Formation, Washington, United States, Eocene (Ypresian) (possibly synonymous with Epinesydrion)
  - †Nymphites Haase, 1890 - Daohugou Bed, China, Middle/Late Jurassic Solnhofen Limestone, Germany, Late Jurassic (Tithonian) Zaza Formation, Russia, Early Cretaceous (Aptian)
  - †Pronymphes Krüger, 1923 - Baltic amber, Eocene
  - †Rafaelnymphes Myskowiak et al., 2016 - Crato Formation, Brazil, Early Cretaceous (Aptian)
- Subfamily Myiodactylinae Handlirsch, 1908
  - †Spilonymphes Shi et al., 2015 - Yixian Formation, China, Early Cretaceous (Aptian)
- Subfamily incertae sedis
  - †Cretonymphes Ponomarenko, 1992 - Zaza Formation, Russia, Early Cretaceous (Aptian)
  - †Dactylomyius Novokshonov, 1990 - Arkagalinskaya Formation, Russia, Late Cretaceous (Campanian) (possibly belongs to Myiodactylinae)
  - †Daonymphes Makarkin et al., 2013 - Daohugou Bed, China, Middle/Late Jurassic
  - †Elenchonymphes Engel & Grimaldi, 2008 - Burmese amber, Myanmar, Late Cretaceous (Cenomanian)
  - †Liminympha Ren & Engel, 2007 - Daohugou Bed, China, Middle/Late Jurassic
  - †Mesonymphes Carpenter, 1929 - Karabastau Formation, Kazakhstan, Late Jurassic, Solnhofen Limestone, Germany, Late Jurassic (Tithonian)
  - †Mesonymphes apicalis Ponomarenko, 1992 - Zaza Formation, Russia, Early Cretaceous (Aptian)
  - †Nymphavus Badano et al., 2018 - Burmese amber, Myanmar, Late Cretaceous (Cenomanian) (known from larvae only, possibly belongs to Nymphinae)
  - †Olindanymphes Martins-Neto, 2005 - Crato Formation, Brazil, Early Cretaceous (Aptian)
  - †Santananymphes Martins-Neto, 2005 - Crato Formation, Brazil, Early Cretaceous (Aptian)
