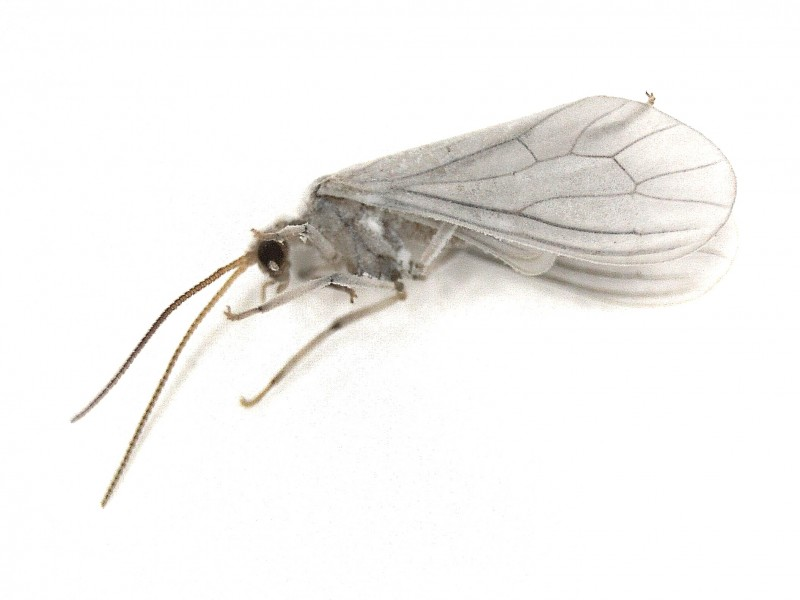
- Conwentzia psociformis

Scientific classification
- Kingdom: Animalia
- Phylum: Arthropoda
- Class: Insecta
- Order: Neuroptera
- Superfamily: Coniopterygoidea

Families
- Coniopterygidae

= Coniopterygoidea =

Superfamily of insects

Coniopterygoidea is a superfamily in the lacewing order Neuroptera which is considered the sister group to all other neuropteran clades. The superfamily includes the single living family Coniopterygidae (dustywings).
