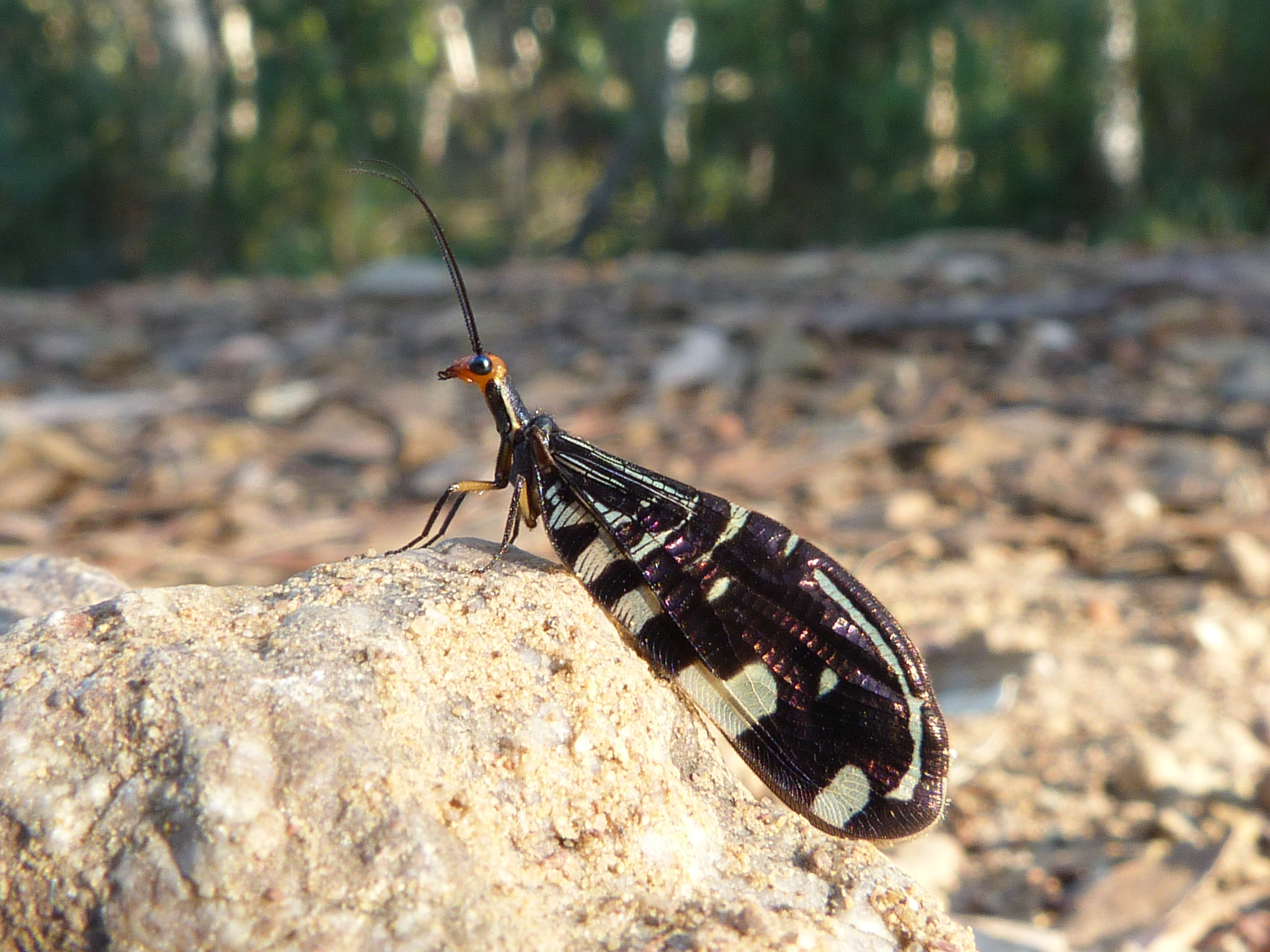
- Porismus strigatus

Scientific classification
- Domain: Eukaryota
- Kingdom: Animalia
- Phylum: Arthropoda
- Class: Insecta
- Order: Neuroptera
- Clade: Euneuroptera
- Superfamily: Osmyloidea

Families
- †Archeosmylidae; Nevrorthidae; Osmylidae; †Saucrosmylidae; Sisyridae

= Osmyloidea =

Osmyloidea Temporal range: Permian–Recent

Superfamily of insects

Osmyloidea is a euneuropteran superfamily in the lacewing order Neuroptera sister to the superfamilies Dilaroidea, Mantispoidea, and the clade Neoneuroptera. The superfamily includes three living families and two extinct families described from the fossil record.

== Taxonomy ==
- Nevrorthidae (Late Cretaceous-Present)
- Osmylidae (Early Jurassic-Present)
- Sisyridae (Late Cretaceous-Present)
- †Archeosmylidae (Permian-Triassic)
- †Saucrosmylidae (Middle Jurassic)
