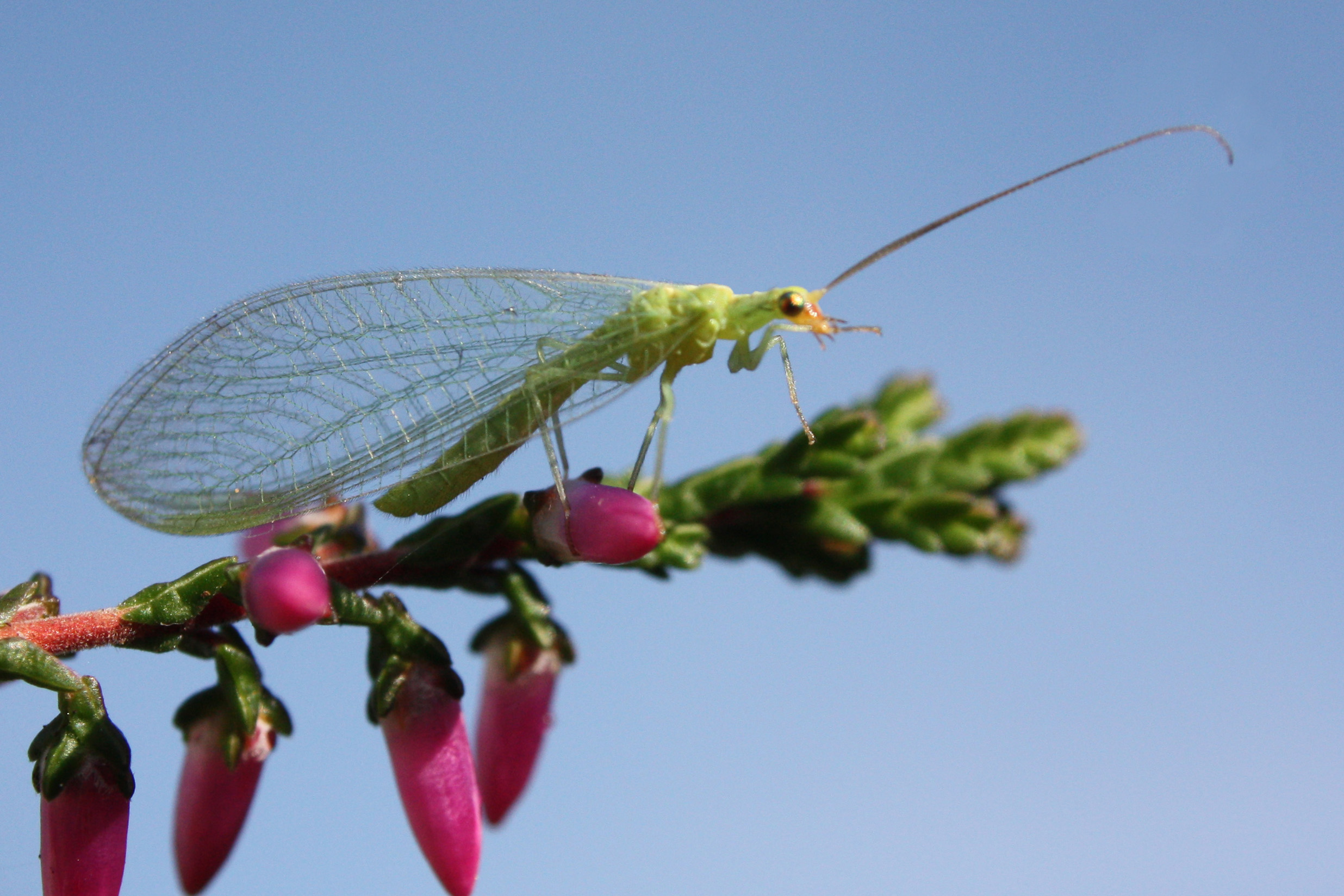
- Green lacewing

Scientific classification
- Kingdom: Animalia
- Phylum: Arthropoda
- Clade: Pancrustacea
- Class: Insecta
- Order: Neuroptera
- Suborder: Hemerobiiformia

Superfamilies
- Chrysopoidea; Coniopterygoidea; Hemerobioidea; Ithonioidea; Mantispoidea

= Hemerobiiformia =

Suborder of insects

The Hemerobiiformia are a suborder of insects in the order Neuroptera that include most of the lacewings, antlions and their allies. The phylogeny of the Neuroptera was explored in 2014 using mitochondrial DNA sequences. The results indicate that the traditional Hemerobiiformia are paraphyletic, meaning that not all the members of the clade are considered to belong to it, in particular since it would include all the Myrmeleontiformia, with which the Hemerobiiformia were traditionally contrasted. The Osmyloidea, usually included in Hemerobiiformia, actually seem to represent a more ancient lineage basal to Hemerobiiformia as well as Myrmeleontiformia. The broken-up group is shown in the cladogram:

- Neuroptera
  - Osmylidae (large lacewings)
  - - - Hemerobiidae (brown lacewings)
      - - Ithonidae (moth lacewings)
        - - Chrysopidae (green lacewings)
          - Mantispidae (mantidflies)
    - - Nymphidae (split-footed lacewings)
      - - Myrmeleontidae (antlions)
        - Ascalaphidae (owlflies)

== See also ==
- Stephanitis pyrioides - the azalea lace bug
