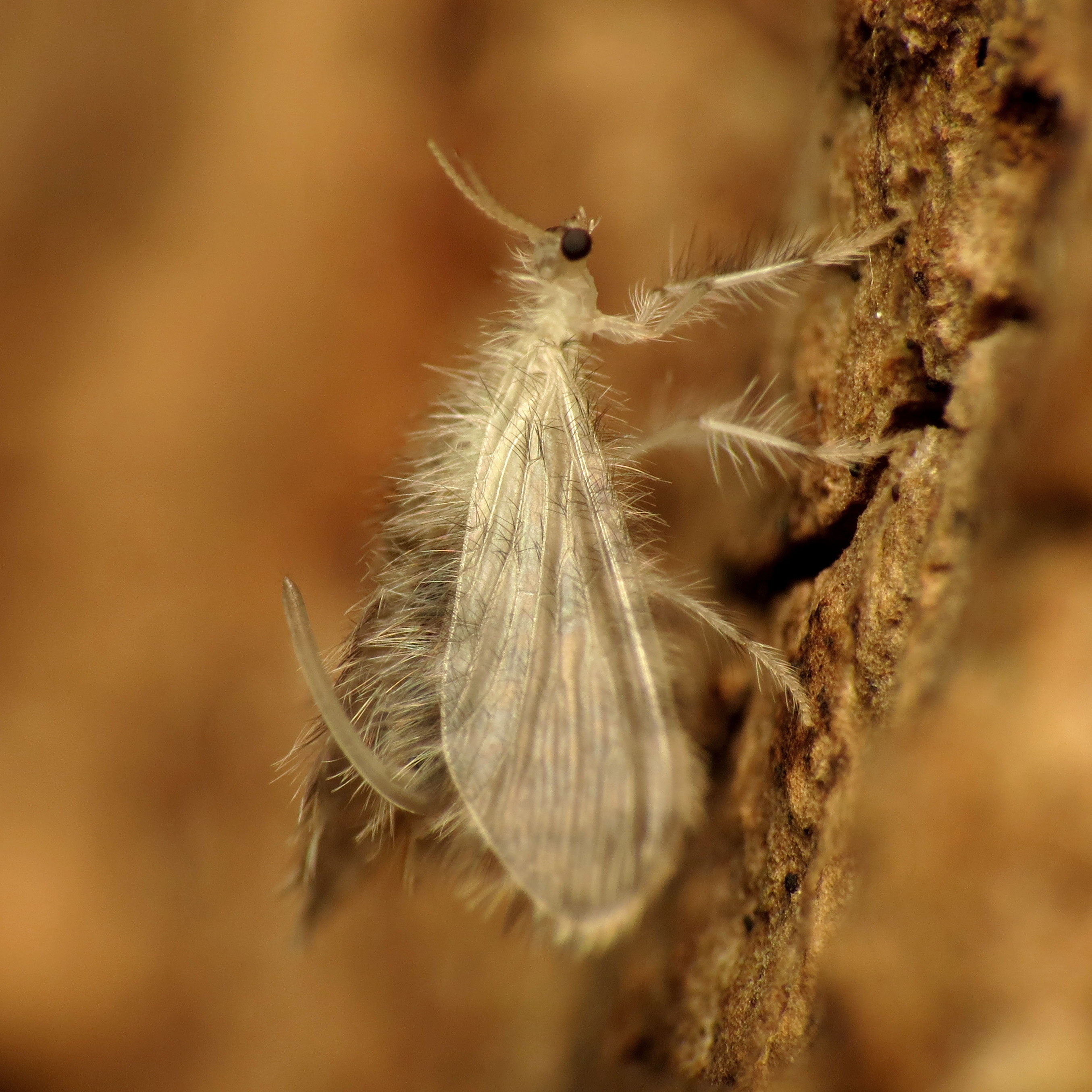
- Nallachius americanus

Scientific classification
- Kingdom: Animalia
- Phylum: Arthropoda
- Clade: Pancrustacea
- Class: Insecta
- Order: Neuroptera
- Superfamily: Dilaroidea
- Family: Dilaridae; Newman, 1853

Subfamilies
- Dilarinae; Nallachiinae

= Dilaridae =

Dilaridae Temporal range: Cenomanian–Recent

Family of insects

Dilaridae is a family of Euneuropteran insects in the order Neuroptera, known as "pleasing lacewings". They were formerly placed in the paraphyletic superfamily Hemerobioidea, though the group is currently placed in the monophyletic superfamily Dilaroidea as a sister group to Mantispoidea and Osmyloidea.

There are about 9 genera and at least 100 described species in Dilaridae.

== Genera ==
These genera belong to the family Dilaridae:

- Berothella Banks, 1934
- †Cascadilar Engel, 1999 - (Priabonian Baltic amber,)
- †Cretadilar Makarkin, 2017 - (Cenomanian. Burmese amber, Myanmar)
- †Cretodilar Liu & Zhang 2016 - (Cenomanian Burmese amber, Myanmar)
- Dilar Rambur, 1838
- Lidar Navás, 1909
- Nallachius Navás, 1909
- Neonallachius Nakahara, 1963

Other genera previously considered to belong to family as the subfamily Cretanallachiinae have subsequently been moved to Kalligrammatidae.
