= A. inexspectatus =

A. inexspectatus may refer to:

- Abacetus inexspectatus, a ground beetle
- Ainigmapsychops inexspectatus, a prehistoric lacewing
