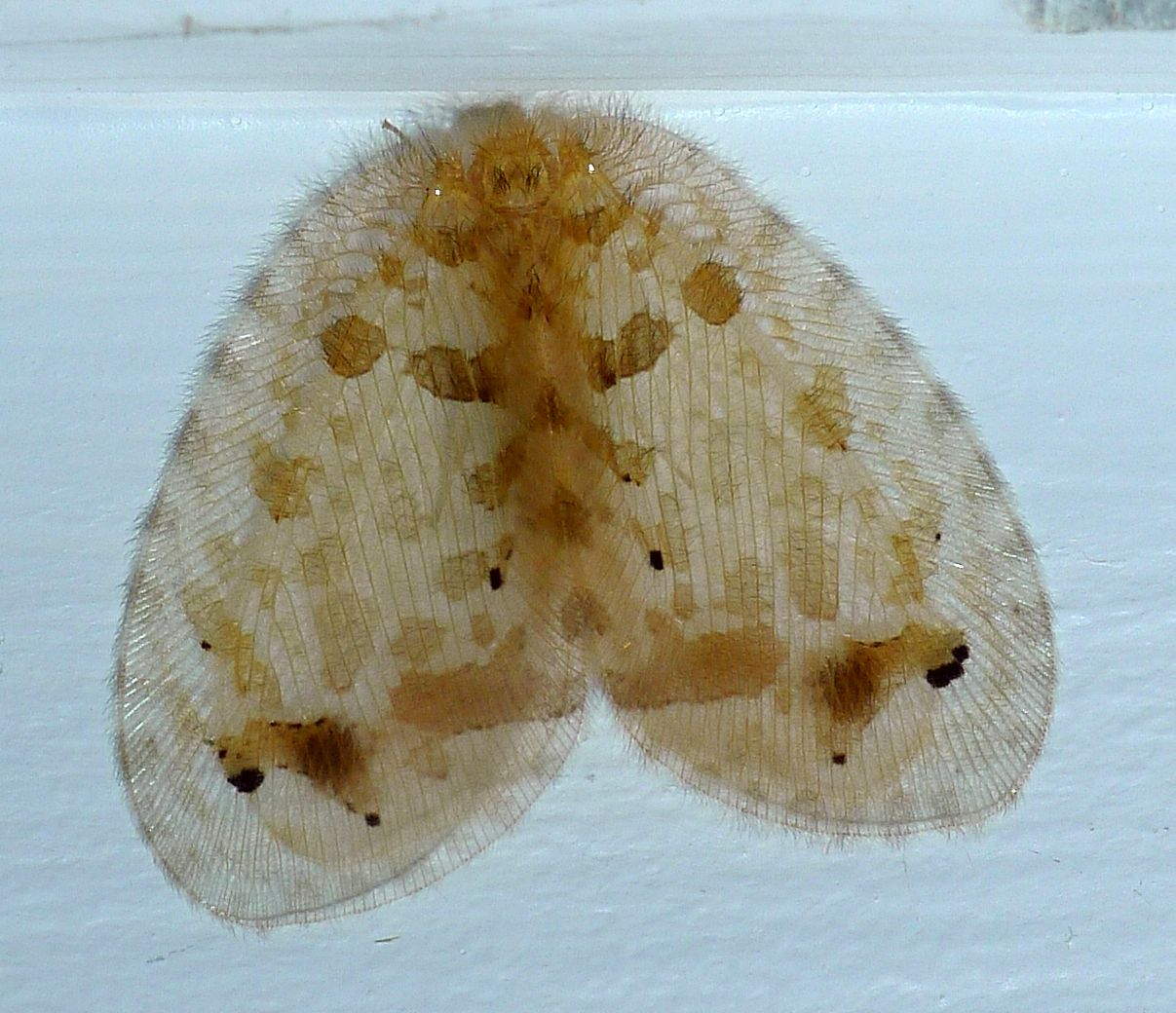
- Psychopsis insolens
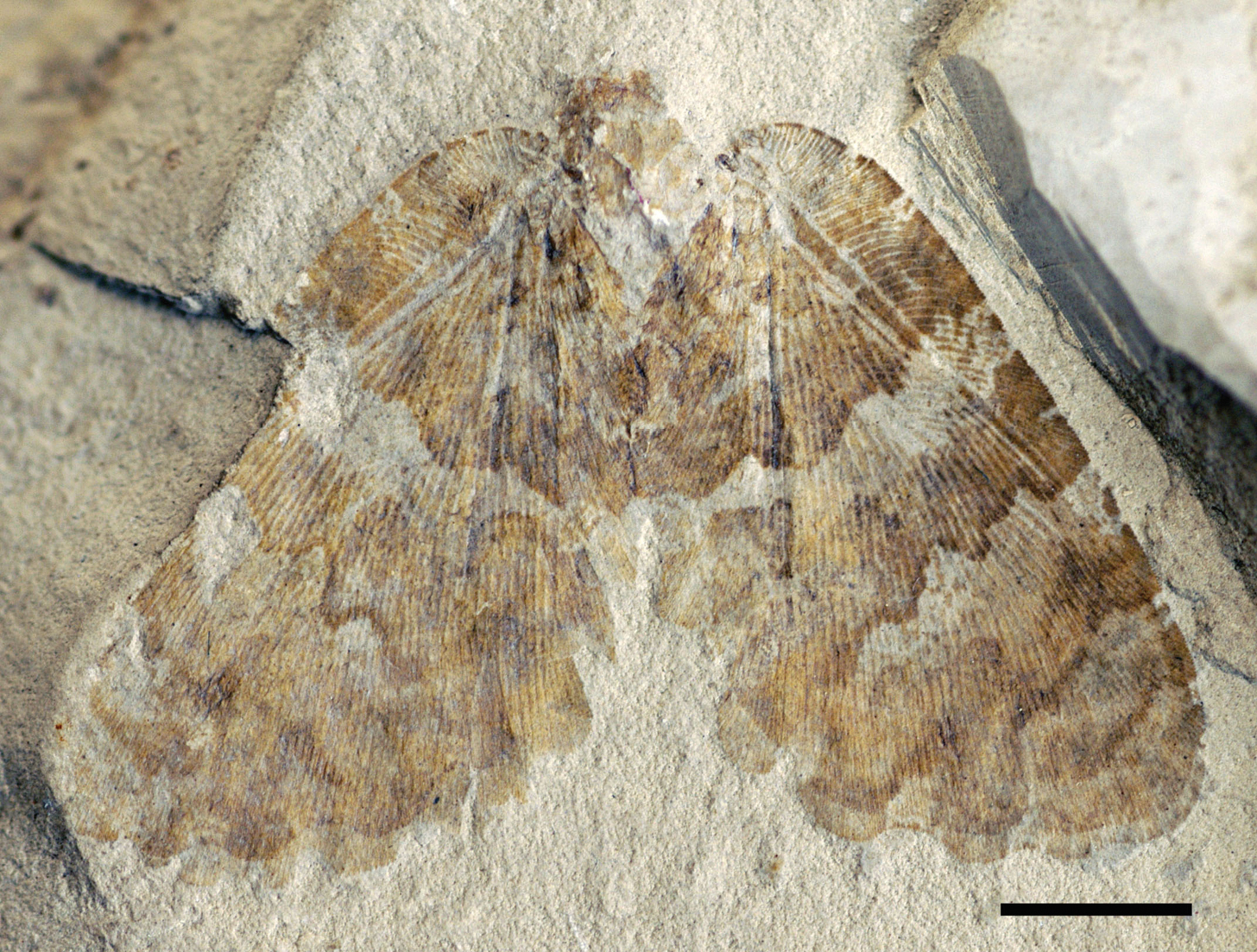
- Undulopsychopsis alexi

Scientific classification
- Kingdom: Animalia
- Phylum: Arthropoda
- Clade: Pancrustacea
- Class: Insecta
- Order: Neuroptera
- Superfamily: Psychopsoidea
- Family: Psychopsidae; Handlirsch, 1906

Genera
- see text

= Psychopsidae =

Silky lacewings Temporal range: Carnian–Recent

Family of insects

Psychopsidae is a family of winged insects of the order Neuroptera. They are commonly called silky lacewings.

The silky lacewings are distinguishable in their adult stage by their spectacularly patterned and pubescent wings, broad wing shape, dense venation, and the presence of a vena triplica (the apical fusion of three veins in the hindwing).

== Taxonomy ==
They were formerly placed in the superfamily Hemerobioidea, but do not seem to be closely related to these net-winged insects at all. Rather, might be closer to the Myrmeleontoidea which contain for example the antlions (Myrmeleontidae). In particular, the spoon-winged laceflies (Nemopteridae) seem to be very closely related to the silky lacewings. These had at one time been placed in a superfamily Nemopteroidea. The fossil family Osmylopsychopidae was - as indicated by their scientific name - initially believed to be intermediate between the Psychopsidae and the Osmylidae. But actually these similarities are due to plesiomorphies in the first case, and simply misperceived in the second; the osmylopsychopids are one of the basal lineages of the Myrmeleontoidea as traditionally defined. The Nemopteroidea were eventually abolished and its members included in the Myrmeleontoidea. But as the silky and spoon-winged lacewings together with the "butterfly" lacewings of the Kalligrammatidae do seem to form a quite distinct clade among the expanded Myrmeleontoidea, it appears well warranted to reinstate the Nemopteroidea for them.

Silky lacewings were especially more diverse from the Triassic period to the Tertiary than in modern times.

== Genera and species ==
The family currently includes five living genera in three subfamilies; there are also a number of extinct genera with uncertain relationships. The extant species are restricted to the Afrotropical (three genera), Indomalayan (one genus) and Australasian (one genus) regions:

Subfamily Psychopsinae

- Genus Balmes (Southwestern and Southern Asia)
  - Balmes birmanus (McLachlan, 1891)
  - Balmes chikuni Wang & Bao, 2006
  - Balmes formosus (Kuwayama, 1927)
  - Balmes notabilis Navás, 1912
  - Balmes terissinus Navás, 1910
- Genus Psychopsis Newman, 1842 (Australia)
  - Psychopsis barnardi Tillyard, 1925
  - Psychopsis coelivaga (Walker, 1853)
  - Psychopsis dumigani Tillyard, 1922
  - Psychopsis elegans (Guérin-Méneville, 1844)
  - Psychopsis gallardi (Tillyard, 1919)
  - Psychopsis gracilis Tillyard, 1919
  - Psychopsis illidgei Froggatt, 1903
  - Psychopsis insolens McLachlan, 1863
  - Psychopsis maculipennis Tillyard, 1925
  - Psychopsis margarita Tillyard, 1922
  - Psychopsis meyricki McLachlan, 1887
  - Psychopsis mimica Newman, 1842
  - Psychopsis tillyardi New, 1989

Subfamily Zygophlebiinae

- Genus Cabralis Navás, 1912 (central to southern Africa)
  - Cabralis gloriosus Navás, 1912
- Genus Zygophlebius Navás, 1910 (central and southern Africa)
  - Zygophlebius leoninus Navás, 1910
  - Zygophlebius pseudosilveira Oswald, 1994
  - Zygophlebius zebra (Brauer, 1889)

Subfamily Silveirainae

- Genus Silveira Navás, 1912 (Afrotropical)
  - Silveira jordani Kimmins, 1939
  - Silveira marshalli (McLachlan, 1902)
  - Silveira occultus Tjeder, 1960
  - Silveira rufus Tjeder, 1960

=== incertae sedis genera ===
The following extinct genera are based on Peng et al. 2011:

- Genus †Ainigmapsychops Makarkin & Archibald, 2014
  - †Ainigmapsychops inexspectatus Makarkin & Archibald, 2014 Klondike Mountain Formation, Eocene (Ypresian); Washington State, USA)
- Genus †Angaropsychops
  - †Angaropsychops sinicus (?Early Cretaceous; Liaoning, China)
  - †Angaropsychops turgensis (Turga Early Cretaceous, Transbaikalia, Russia)
- Genus †Apeirophlebia
  - †Apeirophlebia grandis Green Series, Early Jurassic (Toarcian); Dobbertin, Germany
- Genus †Archepsychops
  - †Archepsychops triassicus (Carnian; Queensland, Australia)
- Genus †Arctopsychops
  - †Arctopsychops zherikhini Late Cretaceous (Turonian); NE Siberia, Russia
- Genus †Baisopsychops
  - †Baisopsychops lambkini Early Cretaceous, Zaza Formation: Transbaikalia, Russia)
- Genus †Beipiaopsychops
  - †Beipiaopsychops triangulatus Haifanggou Formation, Middle Jurassic, Liaoning, China)
- Genus †Calopsychops
  - †Calopsychops extinctus Karabastau Formation, Late Jurassic (Oxfordian/Kimmeridgian); Karatau, Kazakhstan
- Genus †Cretapsychops
  - †Cretapsychops decipiens Daohugou, Middle Jurassic China,
  - †Cretapsychops corami Weald Clay, Early Cretaceous (Barremian), Wealden, UK
- Genus †Embaneura
  - †Embaneura vachrameevi Late Cretaceous (Cenomanian); Emba, Kazakhstan)
- Genus †Epipsychopsis
  - †Epipsychopsis fusca Zaza Formation, Russia
  - †Epipsychopsis variegata Zaza Formation, Russia
- Genus †Grammapsychops
  - †Grammapsychops lebedevi (Cenomanian; Siberia, Russia)
- Genus †Kagapsychops
  - †Kagapsychops aranea Kuwajima Formation, Early Cretaceous Japan)
  - †Kagapsychops continentalis Late Cretaceous (Turonian); Kzyl-Zhar, Kazakhstan
- Genus †Litopsychopsis
  - †Litopsychopsis burmitica Burmese amber, Myanmar, mid-Cretaceous (Albian-Cenomanian)
- Genus †Micropsychops
  - †Micropsychops parallelus Weald Clay, United Kingdom
- Genus †Miopsychopsis
  - †Miopsychopsis relicta (Late Eocene/Early Oligocene; Sikhote-Alin, Russia)
  - †Miopsychopsis sikhotensis (Late Eocene/Early Oligocene; Sikhote-Alin, Russia)
- Genus †Propsychops
  - †Propsychops karatavicus Karabastau Formation, Kazakhstan
- Genus †Propsychopsis Baltic amber, Eocene
  - †Propsychopsis helmi
  - †Propsychopsis hageni
  - †Propsychopsis lapicidae
- Genus †Psychopsites
  - †Psychopsites rolandi (Weald Clay, United Kingdom
- Genus †Pulchroptilonia
  - †Pulchroptilonia espatifata Crato Formation, Brazil, Early Cretaceous (Aptian)
- Genus †Putzneura
  - †Putzneura parcimoniosa Crato Formation, Brazil
- Genus †Sinopsychops
  - †Sinopsychops chengdeensis Jiulongshan Formation, Middle Jurassic; Hebei, China)
- Genus †Triassopsychops
  - †Triassopsychops superbus Blackstone Formation, Australia, Late Triassic (Norian)
- Genus †Undulopsychopsis Peng, Makarkin, Wang, & Ren, 2011
  - †Undulopsychopsis alexi (Yixian Formation, Aptian; Liaoning, China)
- Genus †Valdipsychops Weald Clay, United Kingdom, Early Cretaceous
  - †Valdipsychops minimus
  - †Valdipsychops brigidae
  - †Valdipsychops logunovi
  - †Valdipsychops proudlovei
  - †Valdipsychops maculosus
