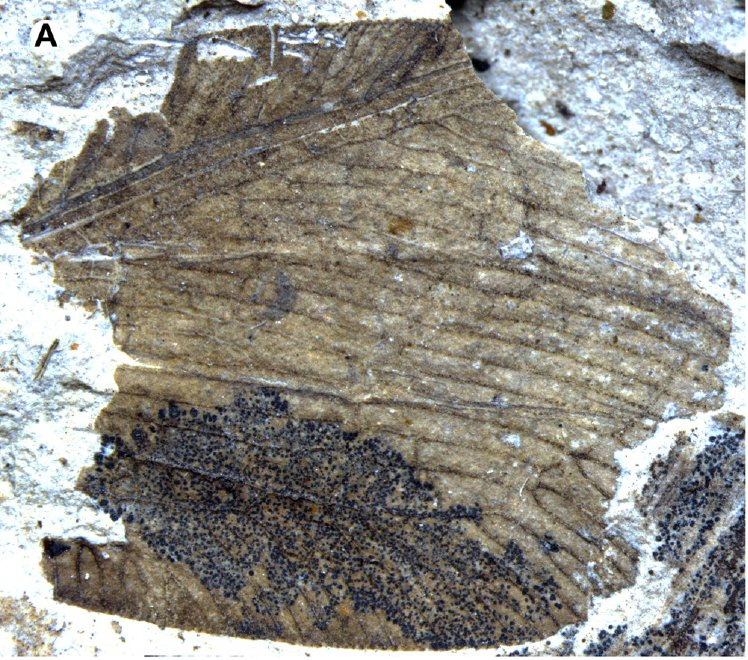
- Holotype SR UI 99-96-76

Scientific classification
- Kingdom: Animalia
- Phylum: Arthropoda
- Clade: Pancrustacea
- Class: Insecta
- Order: Neuroptera
- Family: Psychopsidae
- Genus: †Ainigmapsychops
- Species: †A. inexspectatus

Binomial name
- †Ainigmapsychops inexspectatus Makarkin & Archibald, 2014

= Ainigmapsychops =

Ainigmapsychops Temporal range: Ypresian

Extinct genus of lacewings

Ainigmapsychops is an extinct genus of lacewing in the silky lacewing family Psychopsidae. The genus is solely known from an Eocene fossil found in North America. At the time of its description the new genus was composed of a single species, Ainigmapsychops inexspectatus.

== History and classification ==
Ainigmapsychops inexspectatus is known only from one fossil, the part side of the holotype, specimen number SRUI 99-96-76, which is housed in the collections of the Stonerose Interpretive Center in Republic, Washington. The specimen is preserved as a compression fossil in silty yellow to grayish shale, which was recovered from outcrops of the Tom Thumb Tuff member of the Klondike Mountain Formation. The formation is approximately Early Eocene, Ypresian in age, being radiometrically dated as 49.4 million years old. Ainigmapsychops was first studied by the paleoentomologists Vladimir N. Makarkin of the Far Eastern Branch of the Russian Academy of Sciences and S. Bruce Archibald from Simon Fraser University in Burnaby, British Columbia. Their 2014 type description of the new genus and species was published in the online journal Zootaxa. The genus name Ainigmapsychops was coined by the researchers as a combination of the silky lacewing type genus Psychopsis and the Greek word Ainigma meaning "riddle" or "enigma", which is in reference to the unusual nature of the wing vein structure. The specific epithet inexspectatus is the Latin word meaning "unexpected, unlooked for", alluding to the serendipitous find of the wing.

Areas of the Ainigmapsychops wing venation are similar to members of the neuropteran family Osmylidae. The branches of the CuA, CuP and AA1 veins all have a steep departure angle compared to the main veins in front of them and in relation to the wing margin. There are a number of features that do not conform to the characters found in Osmylidae however.

The structure seen in the subcostal area, that of the second longitudinal wing vein, posterior to the costa, shows at least six weakly developed cross-veins with no connecting veins between the cross veins. This structuring is also seen in the Cretaceous Psychopsid species Undulopsychopsis alexi.

== Description ==
The holotype is composed of a single partially complete fore-wing which is missing both the basal and the apical areas. The preserved section of the fore-wing is approximately 7 mm (0.28 in) long and 6.5 mm (0.26 in) wide, with an estimated length, if whole, of 15 mm (0.59 in). The wing has a costal space that is wide, widening towards the wing base, and which narrows greatly approaching the apex. The wing does not show any cross-veins in the preserved areas of the costal space. The subcostal space is narrow showing at least six preserved cross-veins. The RA space is also narrow, but shows at least ten cross-veins which are irregularly spaced.
