= Yixian Formation =

Geological formation in China

- Stratigraphic range: Barremian; 125.75–124.12 Ma
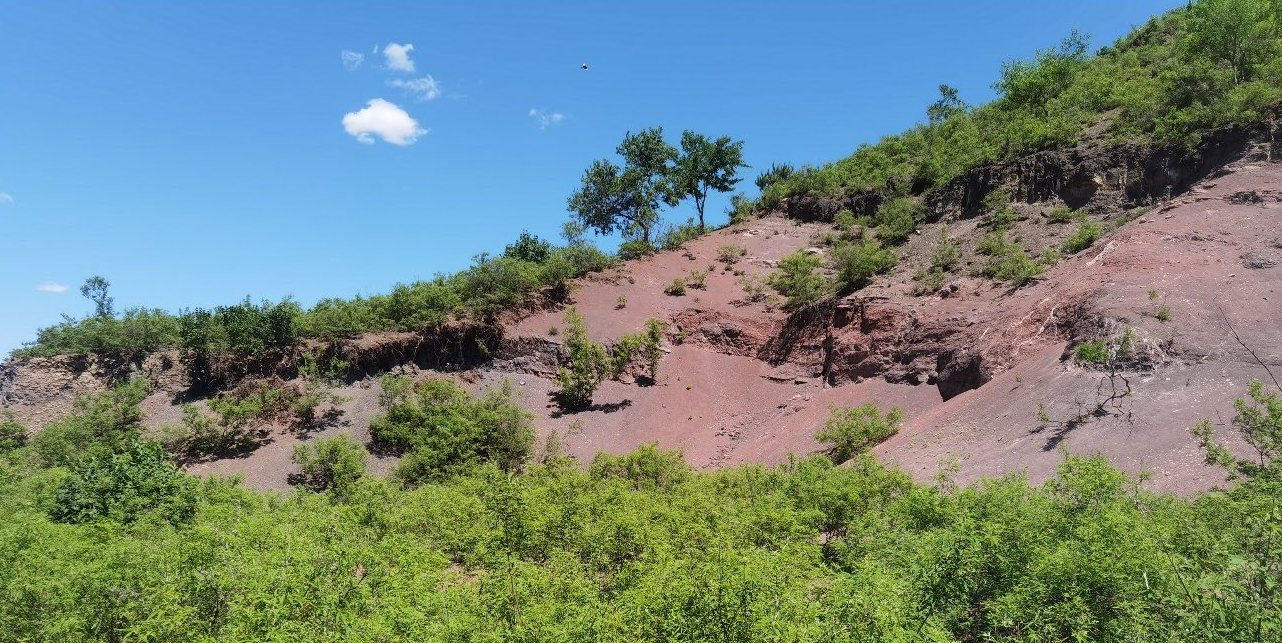
- A hillside showing an outcrop of the Yixian Formation's Lujiatun Member
- Type: Geological formation
- Unit of: Jehol Group
- Sub-units: Jianshangou Bed; Lujiatun Bed
- Underlies: Jiufotang Formation
- Overlies: Dabeigou Formation, Zhangjiakou Formation, Tuchengzi Formation

Lithology
- Primary: Basalt
- Other: Siliciclastic

Location
- Coordinates: 41.5330°N 121.2383°E
- Approximate paleocoordinates: 44.3°N 122.8°E
- Region: Liaoning
- Country: China

Type section
- Named for: Yixian, Liaoning
- Named by: Amadeus William Grabau
- Year defined: 1923
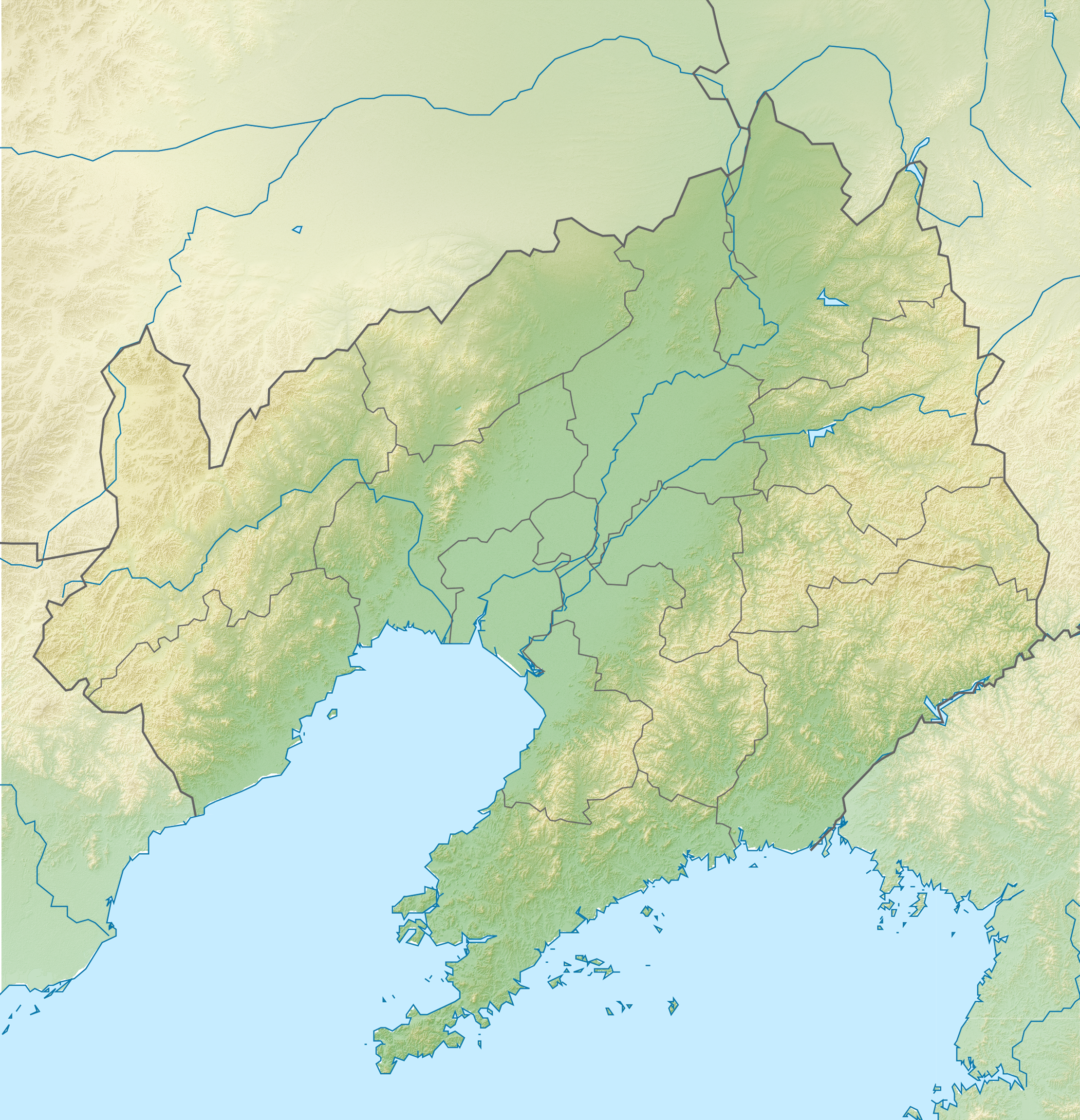
- Yixian Formation (China) Yixian Formation (Liaoning)

The Yixian Formation (simplified Chinese: 义县组; traditional Chinese: 義縣組; pinyin: Yìxiàn zǔ; formerly transcribed as Yihsien Formation or Yixiang Formation) is a geological formation in Jinzhou, Liaoning, People's Republic of China, that spans the Barremian stage of the Early Cretaceous. It is known for its exquisitely preserved fossils, and is mainly composed of basalts interspersed with siliciclastic sediments.

== Research history ==
The potential importance of the Yixian Formation was initially recognized during the time the Empire of Japan occupied China's Rehe ("Jehol") Province after the Defense of the Great Wall in 1933. Many Japanese scientists had noticed fossil remains of extinct fish and reptiles, possibly the champsosaurs. These initial fossil discoveries made by Japanese scientists vanished once World War II ended in 1945. By 1949, when administration of the area passed to the Chinese Communist Party and its leader Mao Zedong, the fossils of Yixian were studied only by Chinese scientists. It was not until the 1990s when remarkable fossils of birds and other non-avian dinosaurs were excavated. Since 1996, a number of dinosaur fossils that have revolutionized knowledge of these animals have been found at Yixian; among them are the first known non-avian theropods with feathers.

== Stratigraphy ==
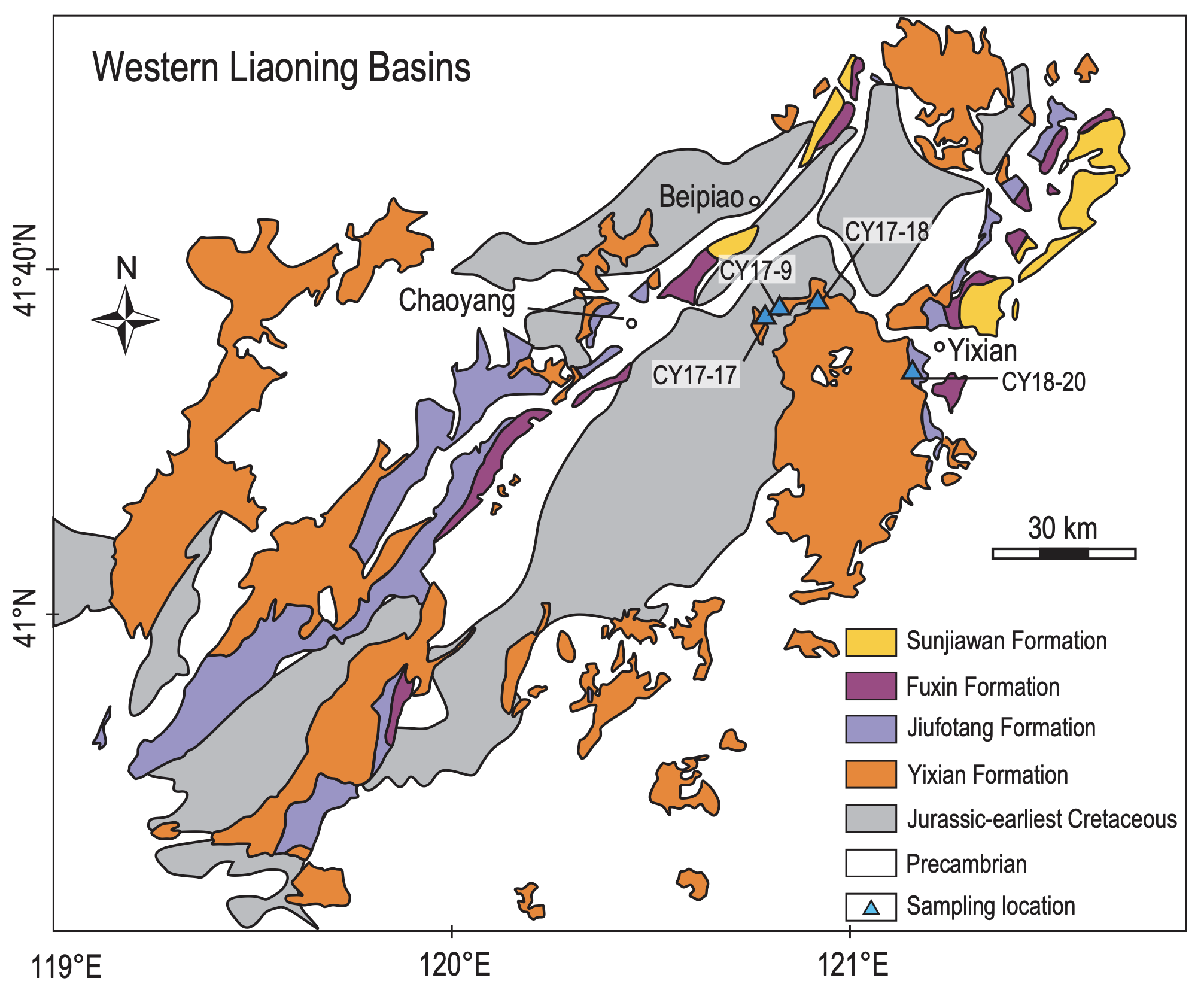
A map of several geological formations in Liaoning, including the Yixian Formation (in orange)

The Yixian Formation is the middle formation of the Jehol Group. It is stratigraphically positioned between the older Dabeigou Formation and the younger Jiufotang Formation. These three formations together preserve broadly similar organisms and vary only in the composition of different groups. This assemblage is generally known as the Jehol biota and is widely known to preserve fossils in extreme detail, including those of small organisms. The Yixian Formation (and the Jehol Group more generally), is composed of lacustrine deposits interbedded with volcanic sediment, indicating the presence of a long-lived dynamic lake system punctuated by catastrophic volcanism. In older publications, these interbedded rock strata were given various names including the Jingangshan, Tuhulu, Jianchang, Lower Volcanic, and Volcanic Rock formations, but today, these are all recognized as being synonymous with the Yixian Formation.

=== Geological age ===
The precise geologic age of the Yixian Formation has been relatively uncertain since it was originally discovered. It has been previously considered to have been deposited during the Jurassic Period (specifically the Tithonian stage). If correct, this would mean a much earlier origin for angiosperms, birds, and eutherians than other evidence tends to suggest. It is also difficult to directly determine the age by comparing it to possible lateral equivalents because in addition to overlying the Dabeigou Formation, parts of the Yixian Formation also unconformably overlies the much older Zhangjiakou and Tuchengzi formations in some places. Modern estimates more confidently place the age of the Yixian Formation as being between the Barremian and Aptian stages, which is corroborated by biostratigraphic correlation of the Jehol biota with other biota of known ages. Specifically, the presence of fossilized pollen similar to other Early Cretaceous sediments as well as the genus Psittacosaurus, which is known from many other Early Cretaceous strata.

Refinement of this age has been controversial in the years since study began. The interbedded volcanic sediments allow for the use of radiometric dating of tuff, biotite, and zircons by various methods. Among these, potassium-argon dating, uranium-lead dating, and rubidium-strontium dating have been used to varying degrees of success. Most modern studies have settled on the use of argon-argon dating of basalts, which is generally believed to yield more precise age estimates. When originally estimated, the Yixian Formation was believed to have been deposited over a period of about 7 million years, during the later Barremian and early Aptian stages. However, the duration of deposition of the formation was narrowed in 2016 by analyzing continuous sedimentary cores to roughly the interval between 129.7 ± 0.5 and 125.2 ± 0.9 million years ago. Recent application of radiometric estimates in 2021 has yielded a maximum age of 125.755 ± 0.061 million years and a minimum age of 124.122 ± 0.048 million years. If true, this would make the entire duration of deposition of the Yixian Formation about 1.633 ± 0.078 million years, which is considerably shorter than the initial estimates and would place it wholly within the Barremian stage of the Early Cretaceous.

=== Subdivisions ===
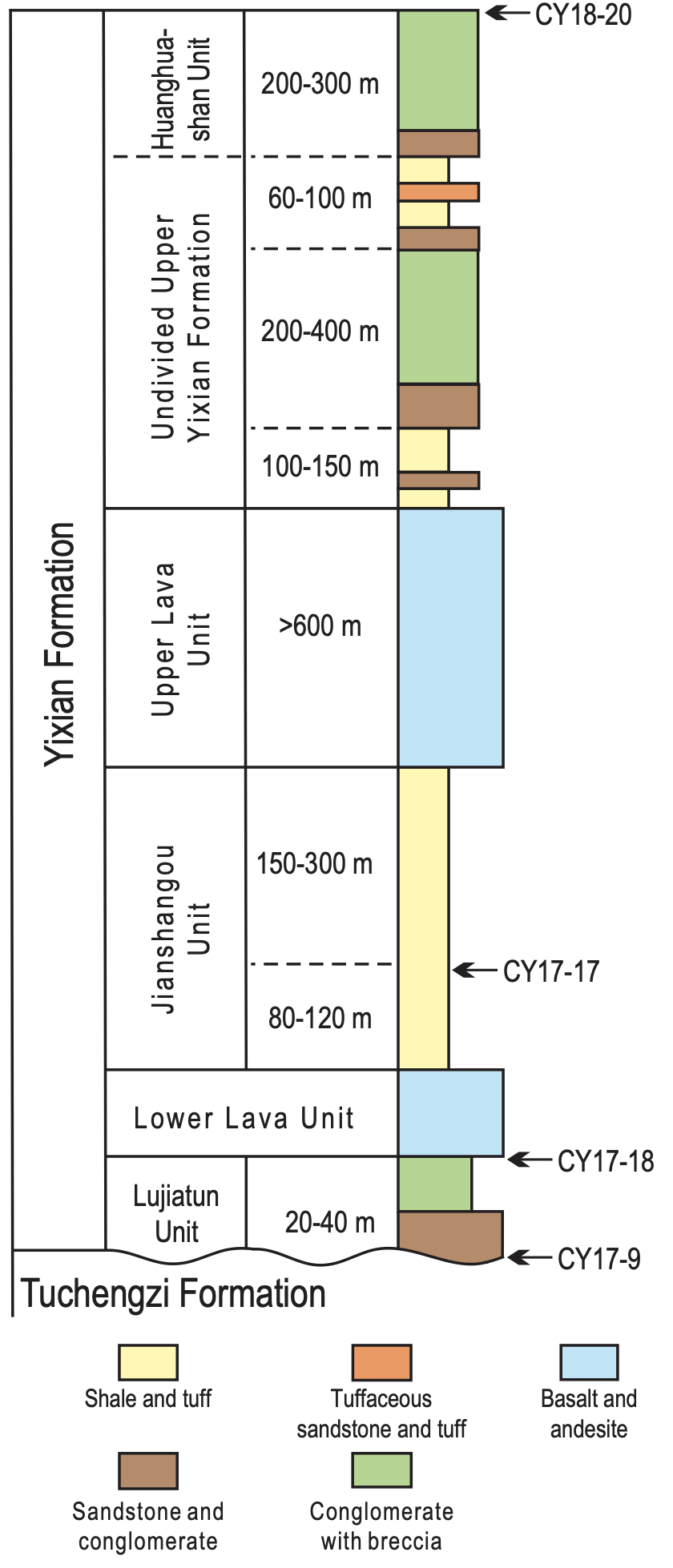
Stratigraphic diagram of the various layers of the Yixian Formation

The Yixian Formation is broadly subdivided into several geological subunits. In ascending order (lowest to highest):

- Lujiatun Unit: 20–40 metres (66–131 ft) thick; composed of sandstone, conglomerate, and breccia
- Lower Lava Unit: unknown thickness; composed of basalt and andesite (also sometimes called the Xiatulaigou member)
- Jianshangou Unit: 230–420 metres (750–1,380 ft) thick; composed of shale and tuff
- Upper Lava Unit: more than 600 metres (2,000 ft) thick; composed of basalt and andesite
- Upper Yixian: 360–650 metres (1,180–2,130 ft) thick; composed primarily of conglomerate with breccia, but also contains strata of shale and tuff, tuffaceous sandstone, and sandstone conglomerate (parts of the Upper Yixian are also sometimes called the Dawangzhangzi Unit)
- Huanghuanshan Unit: 200–300 metres (660–980 ft) thick; composed primarily of conglomerate with breccia with some sandstone conglomerate in the lower strata (sometimes called the Jingangshan Unit)

The lower units (Lujiatun, Lower Lava, and Jianshangou) were originally grouped separately from the Yixian Formation under the names "Sihetun Formation" or "Chaomidianzi Formation" in the late 1990s. Various revisions to this arrangement have been made by several authors in the period from 2000 to 2010, including the consolidation of the Jiulongsong and Hengdaozi members into what is today called the Jianshangou Unit. Since 2010, most authors have used the same nomenclatural scheme (shown above). Although the nomenclature of the uppermost units has been inconsistent, these composition of these members have been generally agreed upon in the literature. Some authors do not consider the Dawangzhangzi and Huanghuanshan units to be distinct enough to separate, opting instead to call this interval the "Undivided Upper Yixian Formation".

The relative ages of these subunits has been a matter of considerable scientific debate. In particular, the lower members of the Yixian Formation have been subject to revision multiple times over the last three decades. They were originally interpreted as a traditional chronological sequence, with the Lujiatun Unit being deposited first, followed by a major volcanic deposition event creating the Lower Lava Unit, and then the deposition of the Jianshangou Unit. However, more recent measurements have suggested slightly overlapping or even fully contemporaneous deposition of the Lujiatun and Jianshangou Units. Wang and colleagues made efforts to standardize the stratigraphy of the lower half of the Yixian Formation and their scheme further subdivided the Jianshangou Member into (in ascending order) the Dajianshanzi, Anjiagou, Hengdaozi, and Huangbanjigou beds. The relative ages of these beds at present is unresolved and different researchers have yet to reach a consensus. Furthermore, the upper units of the Yixian Formation are generally less fossil-rich, and have received considerably less attention in the scientific literature, and so their stratigraphy remains somewhat unresolved.

== Paleoclimate ==
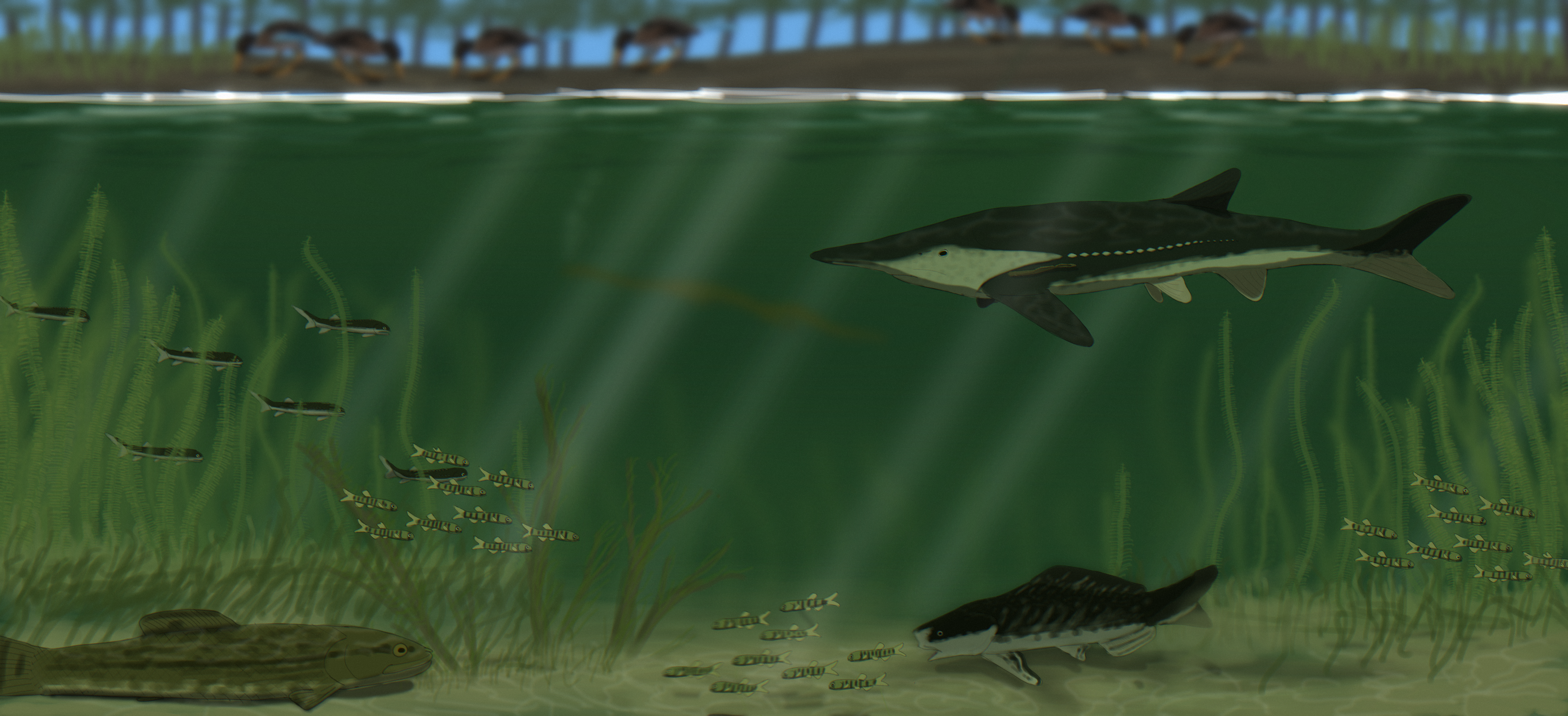
A reconstruction of several fish in one of the lakes that made up what is now the Yixian Formation

With the diversity of plant life in the Yixian well known, including examples of a variety of petrified wood and growth rings, and with the help of chemical analysis, scientists have been able to determine the climate of the formation. The Yixian flora was dominated by conifers closely related to modern species that are found mainly in subtropical and temperate upland forests. The presence of ferns, cycads, and horsetails indicates a generally humid climate. However, evidence from the growth rings of petrified wood indicates that the humidity and water supply dropped regularly. This shows that the wet, humid conditions were punctuated by dry seasons, in which the environment became more arid. Evidence from the study of oxygen isotopes has shown that the average yearly temperature during this time period was 10 degrees celsius (50 degrees Fahrenheit), significantly colder than once thought. This indicates a temperate climate with unusually cold winters for the generally warm Mesozoic era, possibly due to northern China's high latitude during this time. A study by Wu et al. (2013) concluded that orbital forcing, which is the effect on climate caused by shifts in the tilt of the Earth's axis and by the shape of the Earth's orbit, contributed to the climate fluctuations of this formation.

== Fossil content ==
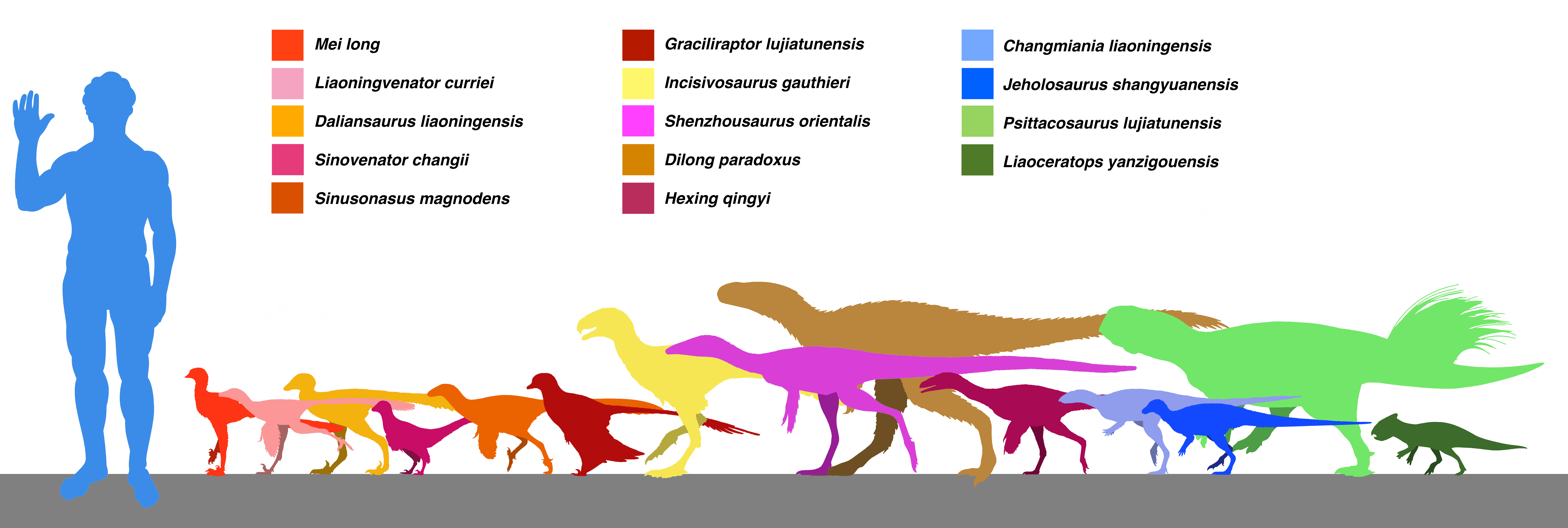
Size comparison of the non-avian dinosaurs from the lower Lujiatun Member of the Yixian Formation

The Yixian Formation represents the second of three major faunal phases that characterize the Jehol Biota, mainly based on changes in invertebrate diversity. In the Yixian, ostracods (seed shrimp) had diversified considerably, despite a very low diversity in the earlier Dabeigou Formation. Other major invertebrate groups in the Yixian include clam shrimp and insects. Insects, as a group, experienced their largest diversification of the entire Mesozoic era in the Yixian. On the other hand, some invertebrate groups, such as bivalves and gastropods (snails and slugs), were numerous but low in diversity, being mainly represented by one or two dominant species (Arguniella in the case of the bivalves).

Studies of vertebrates have shown support for the division of the Jehol into phases, and the diversity of fish in the Yixian was distinct from older and younger formations, with Lycoptera as the dominant species. The Yixian preserves the first Jehol dinosaurs and pterosaurs (which have not been found in the older Dabeigou Formation), and the first major radiation of birds (only one bird species is known from the Dabeigou). The Yixian also preserves the largest (and only) mammal radiation so far known from the Jehol group. Most vertebrates showed a tendency to climb trees or become arboreal, including many tree-dwelling birds, and climbing mammals and lizards.

Plant life reached its Jehol biota peak in the Yixian. Five species of flowering plant were present (three of Archaefructus, one of Archaeamphora and one of Hyrcantha (formerly Sinocarpus), as were a variety of horsetails that closely resembled modern species. It is possible that increasing animal and plant diversity were linked. The Yixian is characterized by extensive forests, dominated by trees such as ginkgoes, conifers, cycads, and seed fern trees. Ground cover plants included lycopods, horsetails, ferns, and primitive flowering plants, which were rare compared to the others.

This plant life grew around a series of freshwater lakes, provided with abundant minerals thanks to periodic volcanic eruptions. Volcanic activity, along with periodic wildfires, and noxious gasses released from the lake bottoms caused the ecosystem to be continually destroyed and regrown. This, along with the wide diversity of habitats in the surrounding region, may have contributed to the fast diversification of life forms present in the Yixian ecosystem.

The Yixian Formation is well known for its great diversity of well-preserved specimens and its feathered dinosaurs, such as the large tyrannosauroid Yutyrannus, the therizinosaur Beipiaosaurus, and various small birds, along with a selection of other dinosaurs, such as the iguanodontian Bolong, the sauropod Dongbeititan and the ceratopsian Psittacosaurus. Other biota included the troodontid Mei, the dromaeosaurid Tianyuraptor, the compsognathid Sinosauropteryx and the tyrannosauroid Dilong. Microraptorians, such as Sinornithosaurus and Graciliraptor, also inhabit the Yixian. A limnic eruption may have preserved many of the fossils, excluding Dongbeititan.

=== Gallery ===
Exemplary fossils from the Yixian Formation
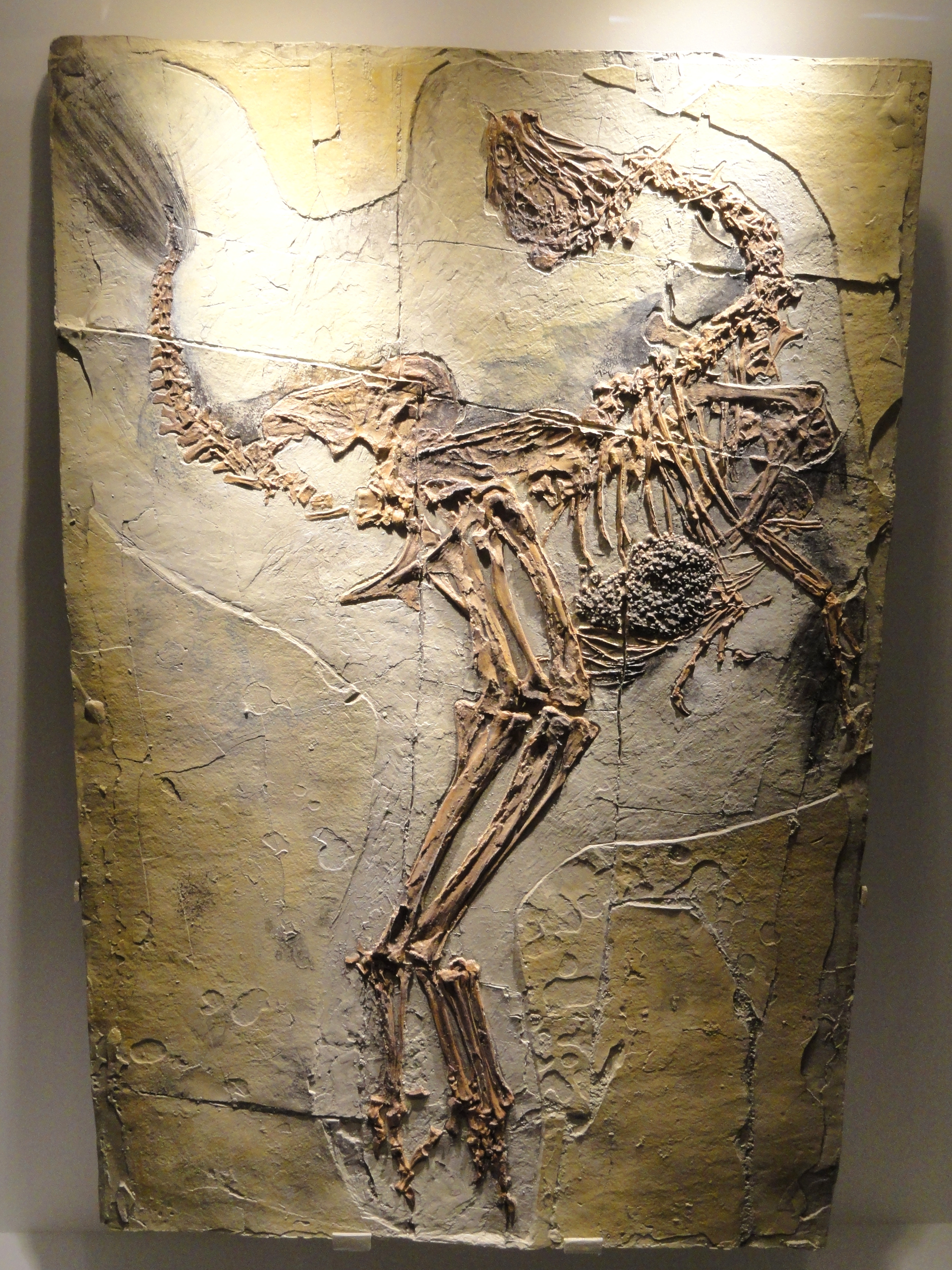
Caudipteryx (an oviraptorosaurian dinosaur)

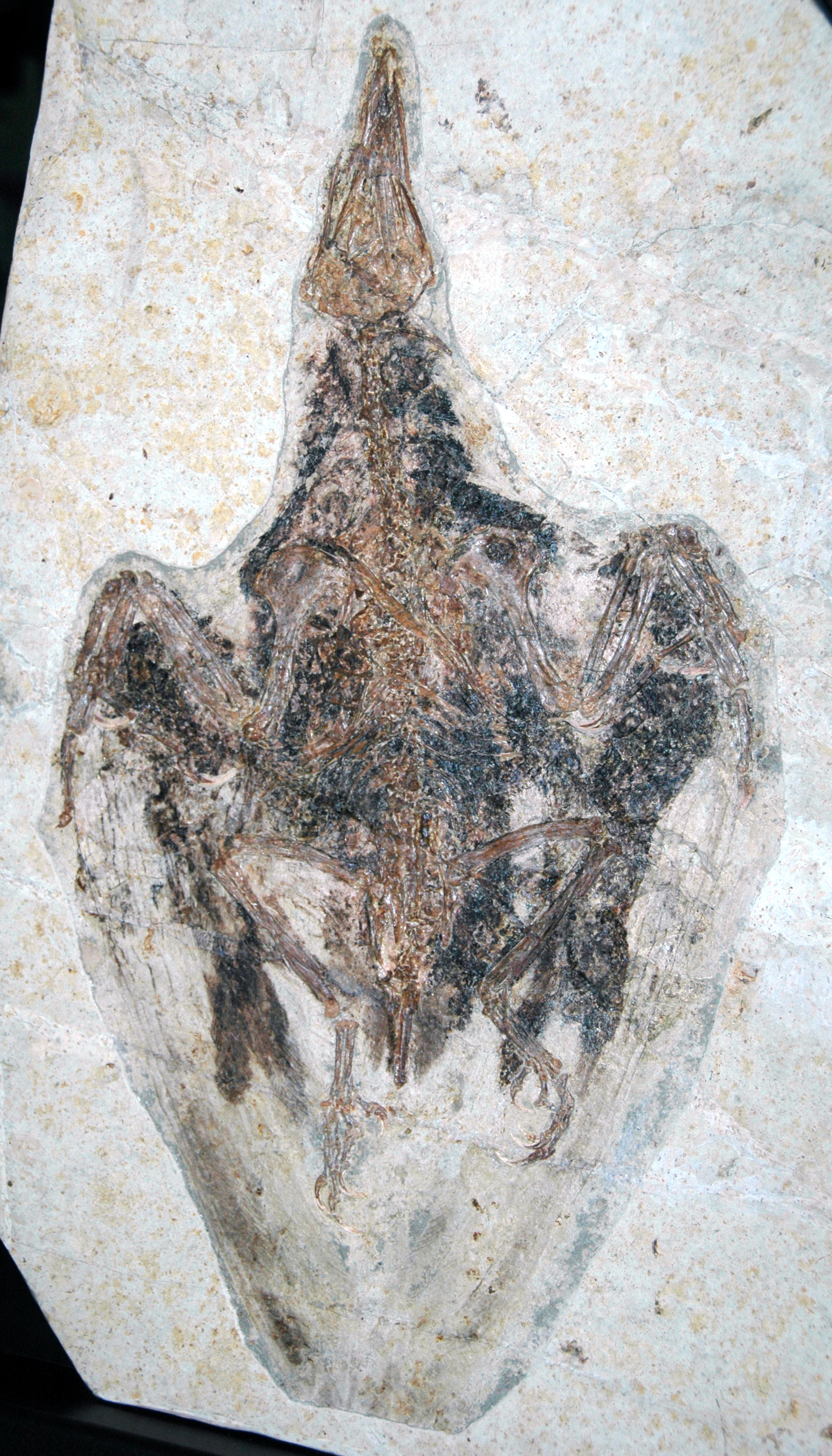
Confuciusornis (a stem-bird)

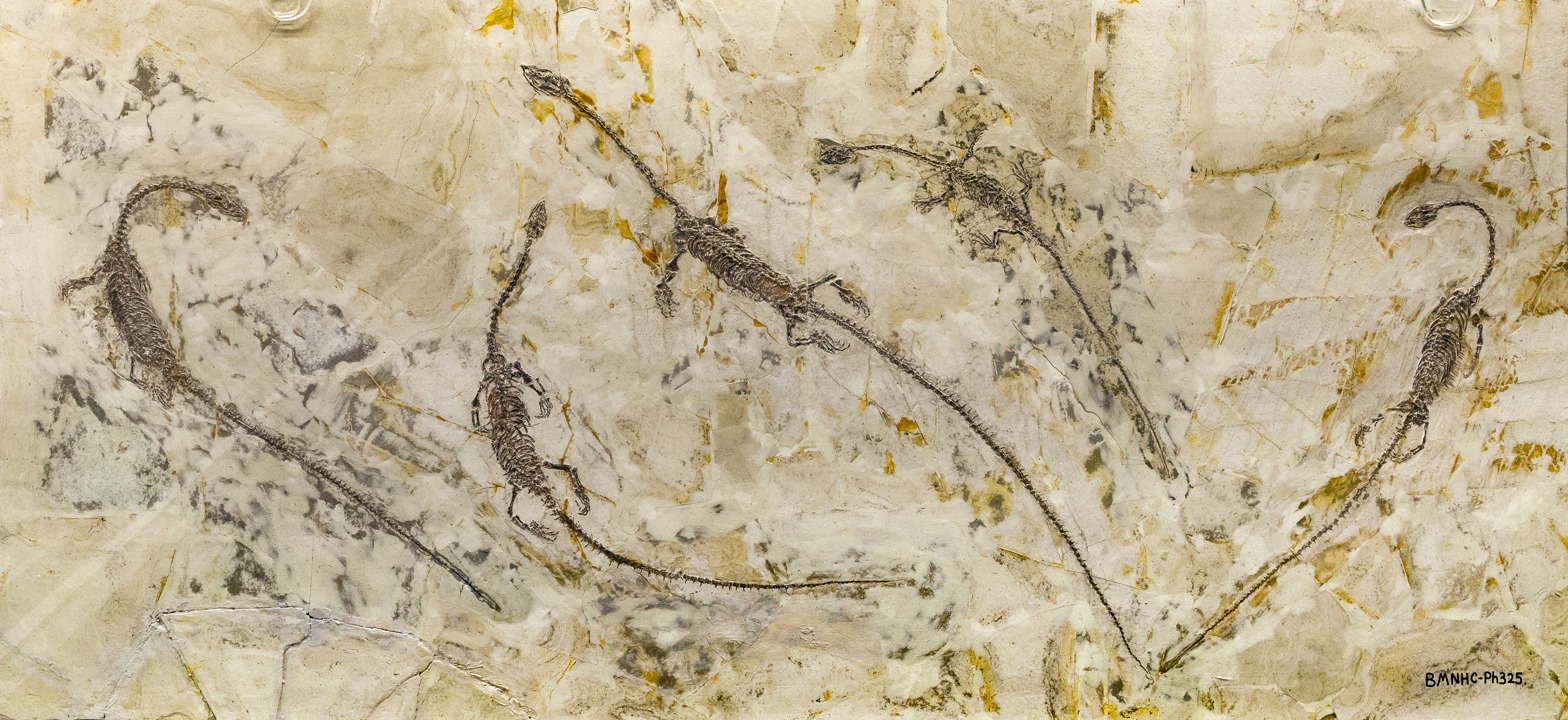
Hyphalosaurus (an aquatic choristodere)

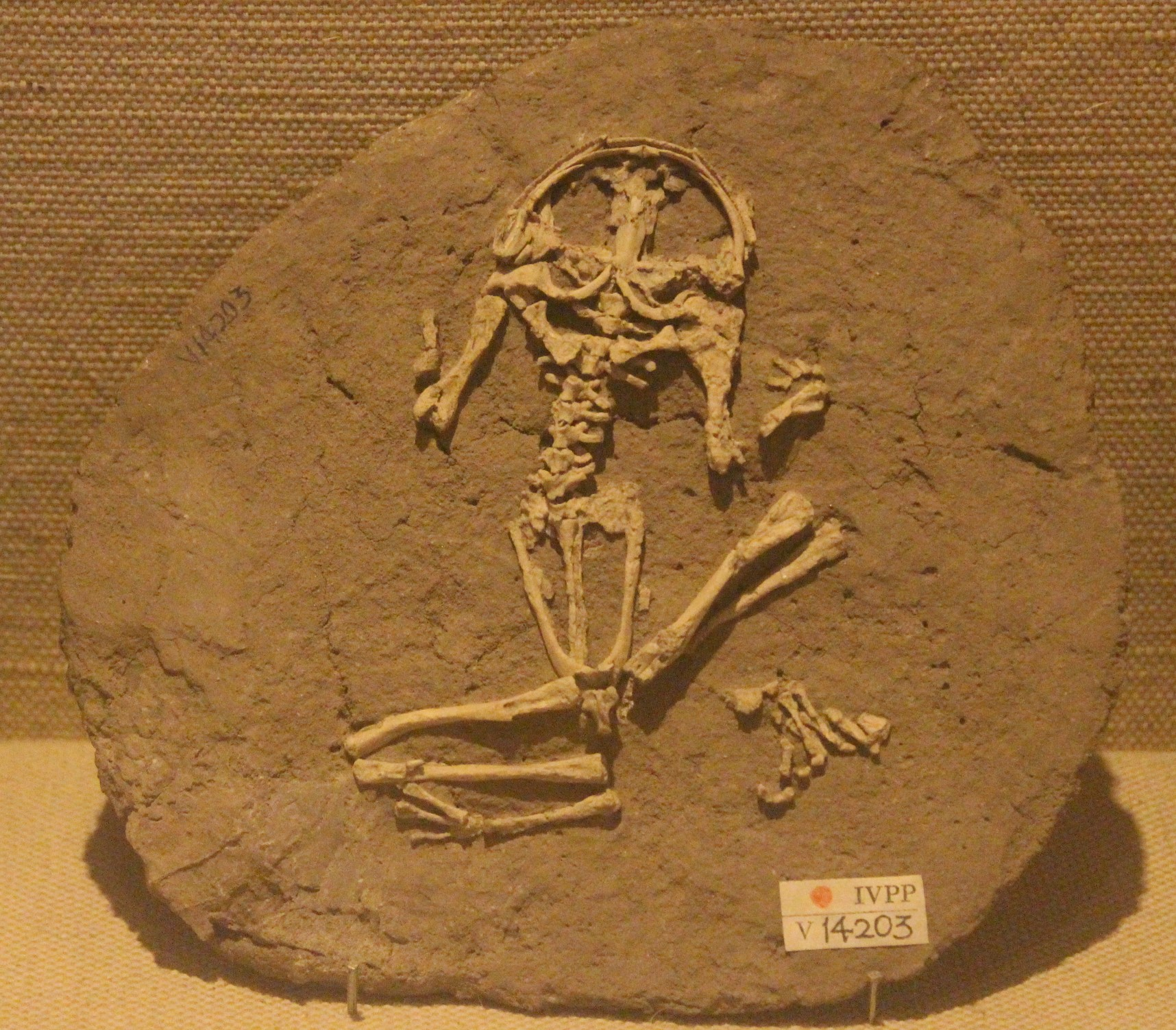
Liaobatrachus (a fossil frog)

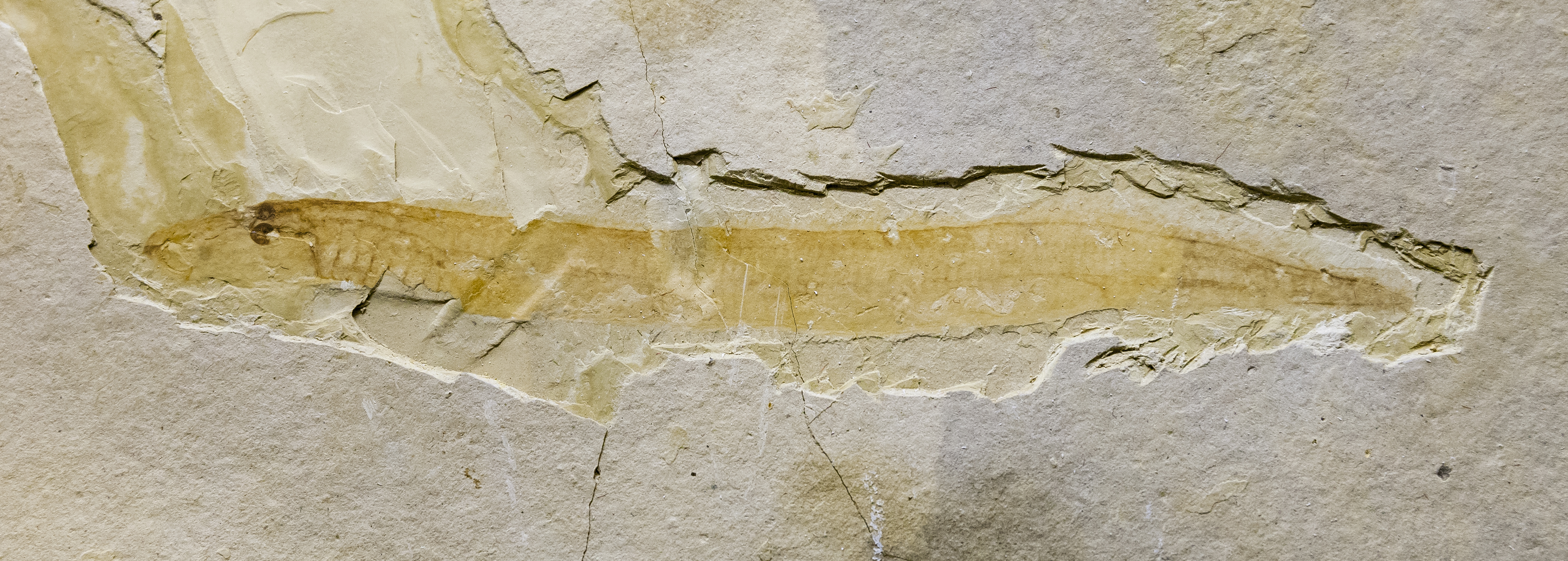
Mesomyzon (a rare example of a fossil lamprey)

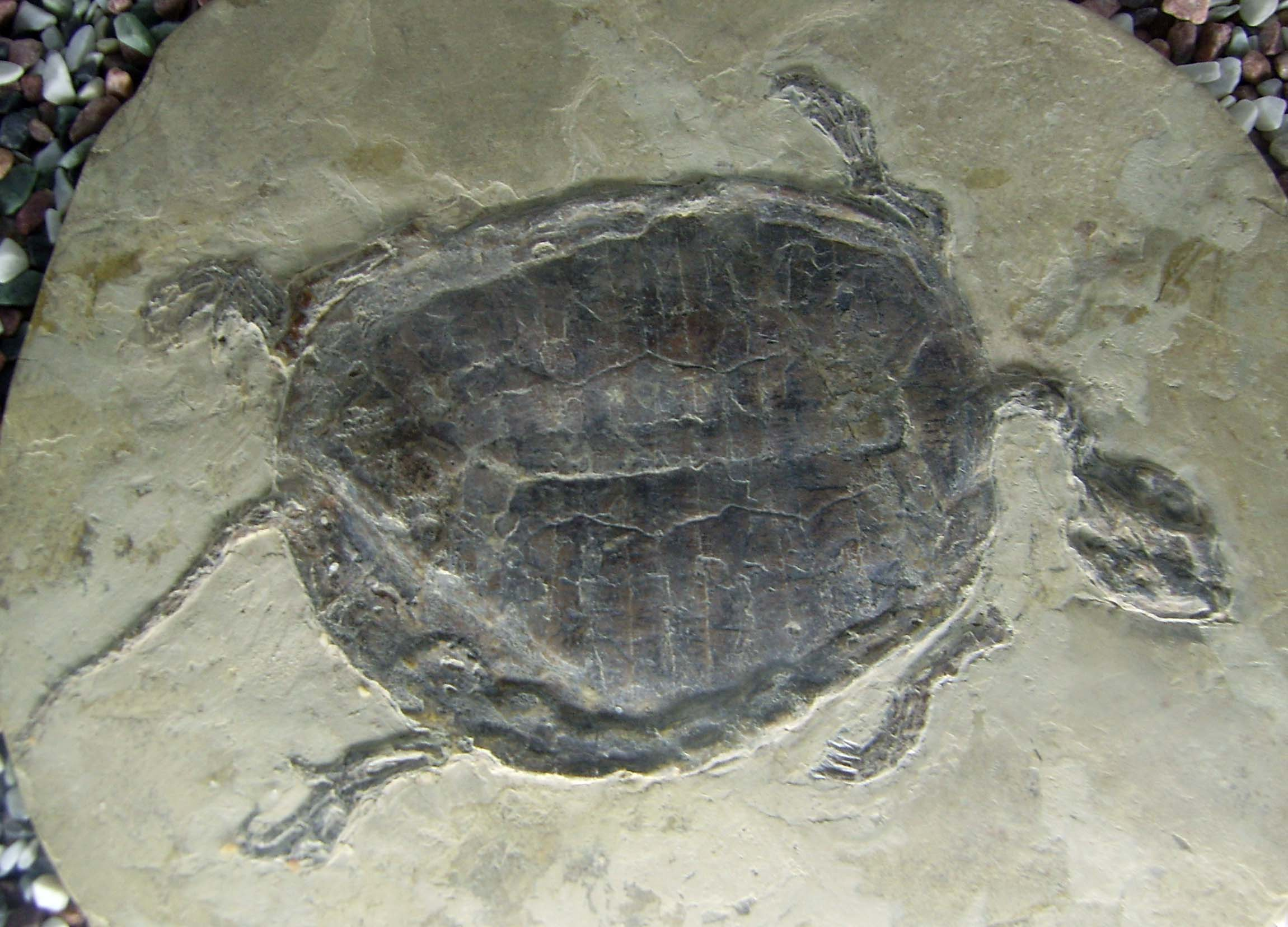
Ordosemys (a prehistoric species of turtle)

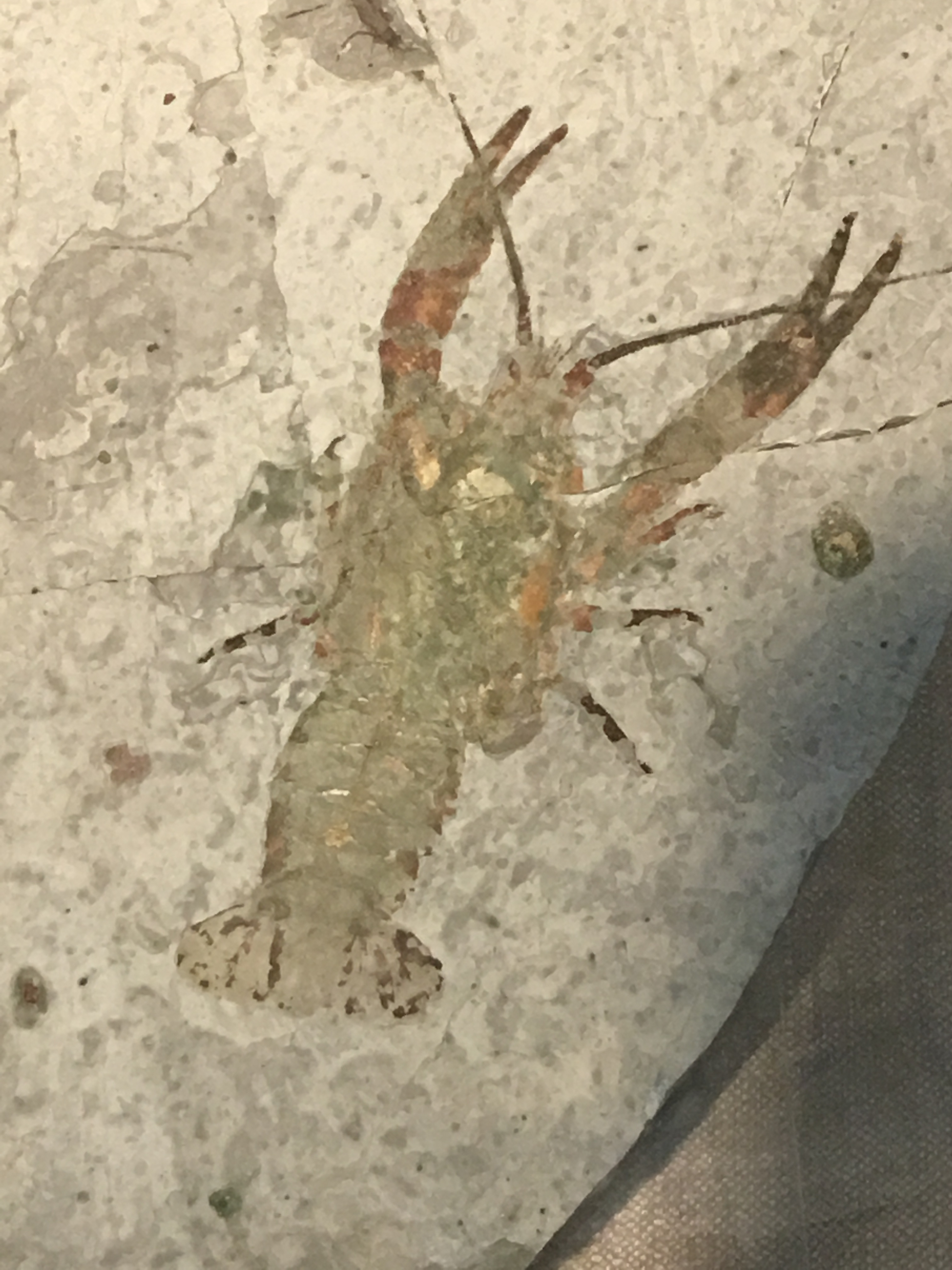
Palaeocambarus (a crawfish)

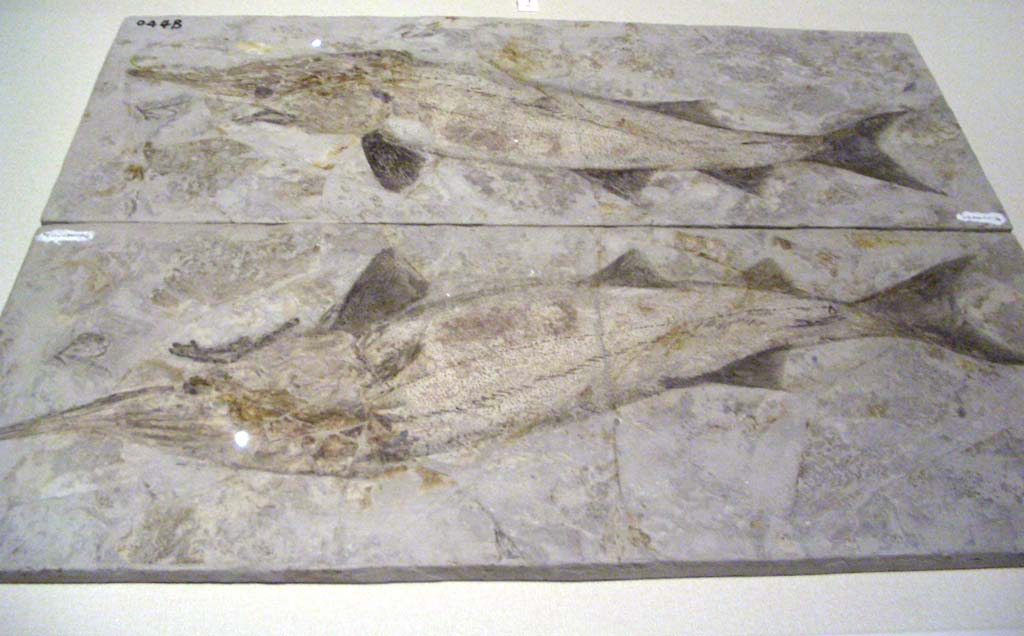
Protopsephurus (an ancient species of paddlefish)

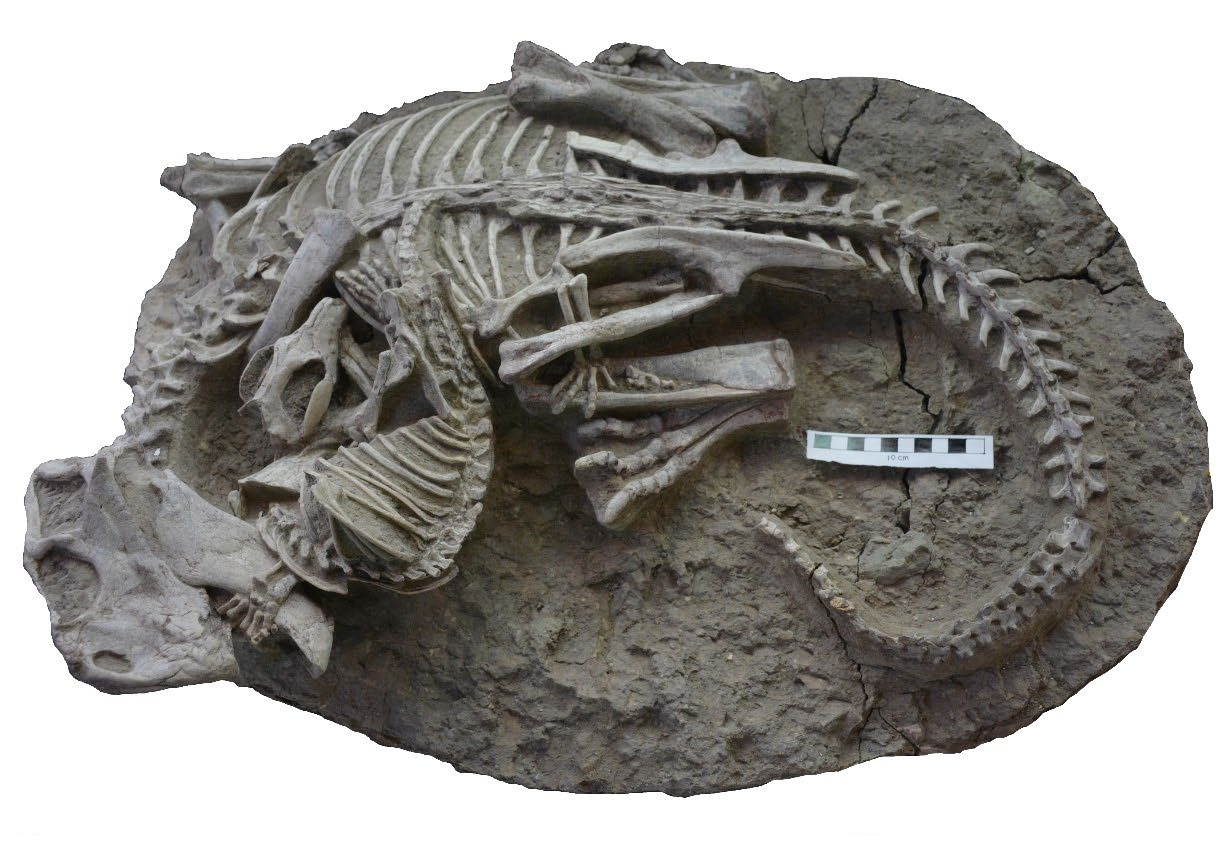
Psittacosaurus preserved in combat with Repenomamus (a eutriconodont mammal)

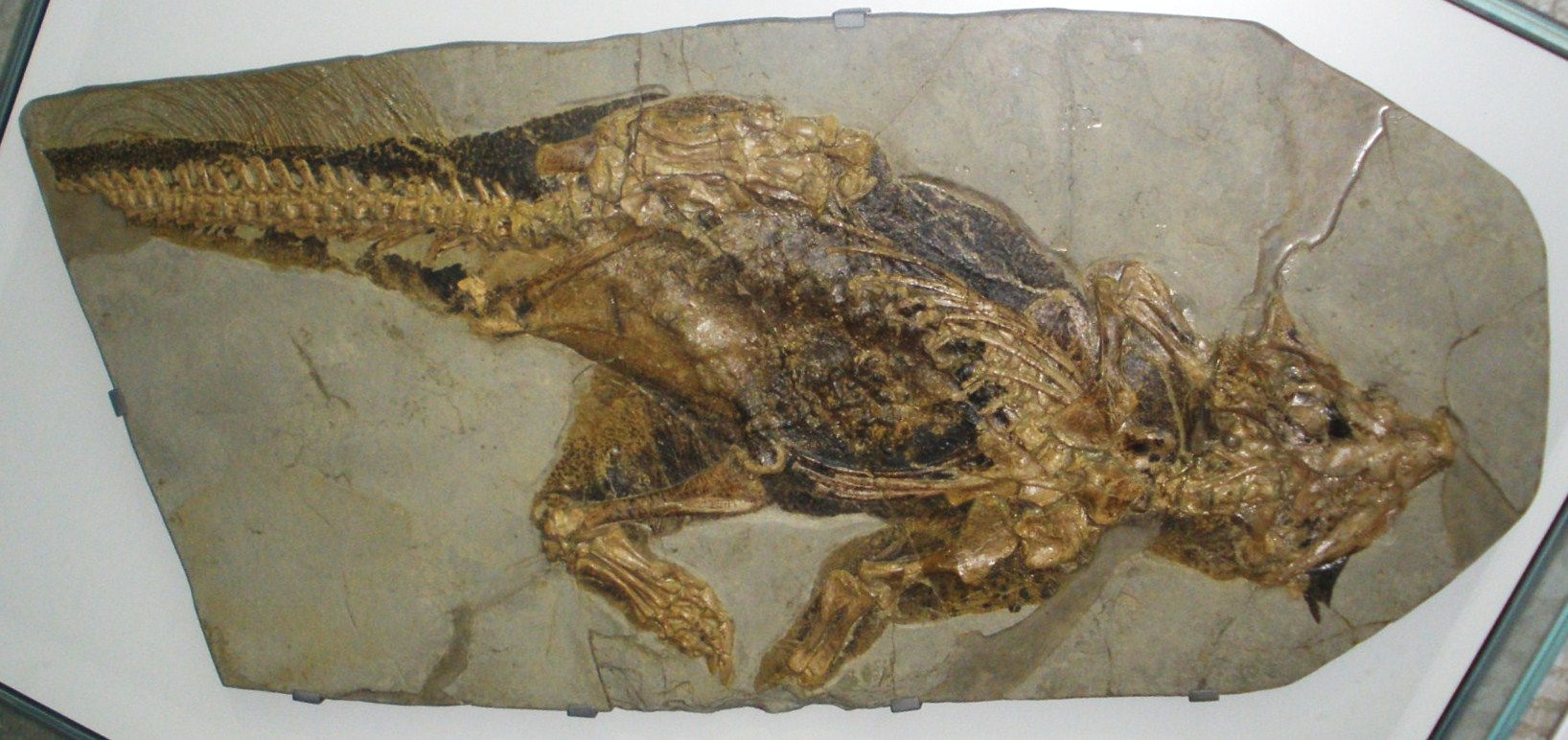
Psittacosaurus showing soft tissues preserved

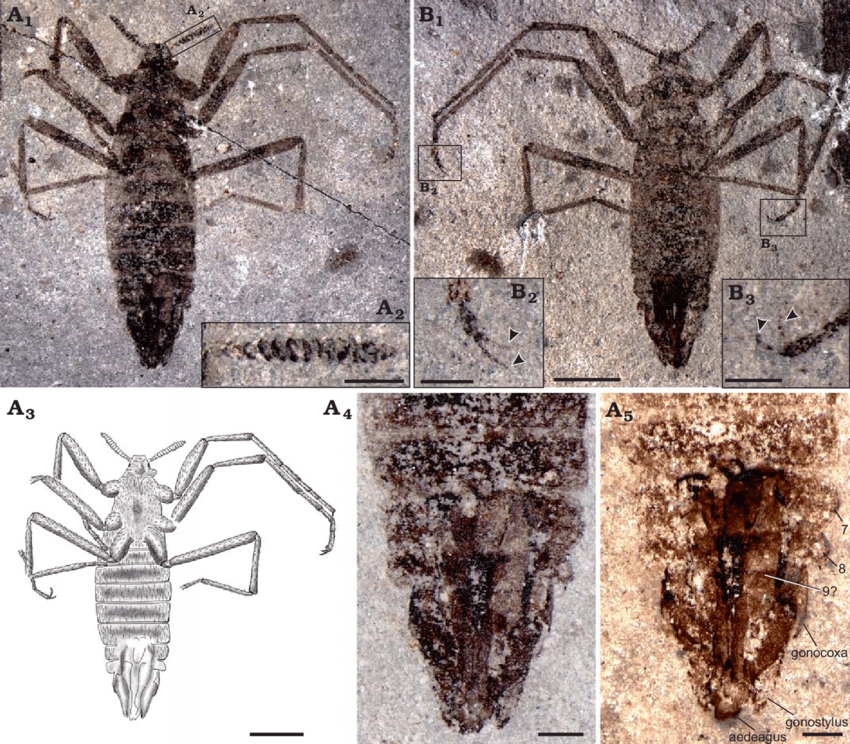
Saurophthirus (a fossilized flea)

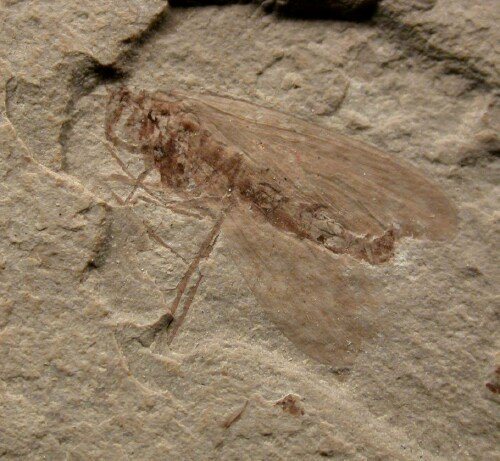
fossilized scorpion fly

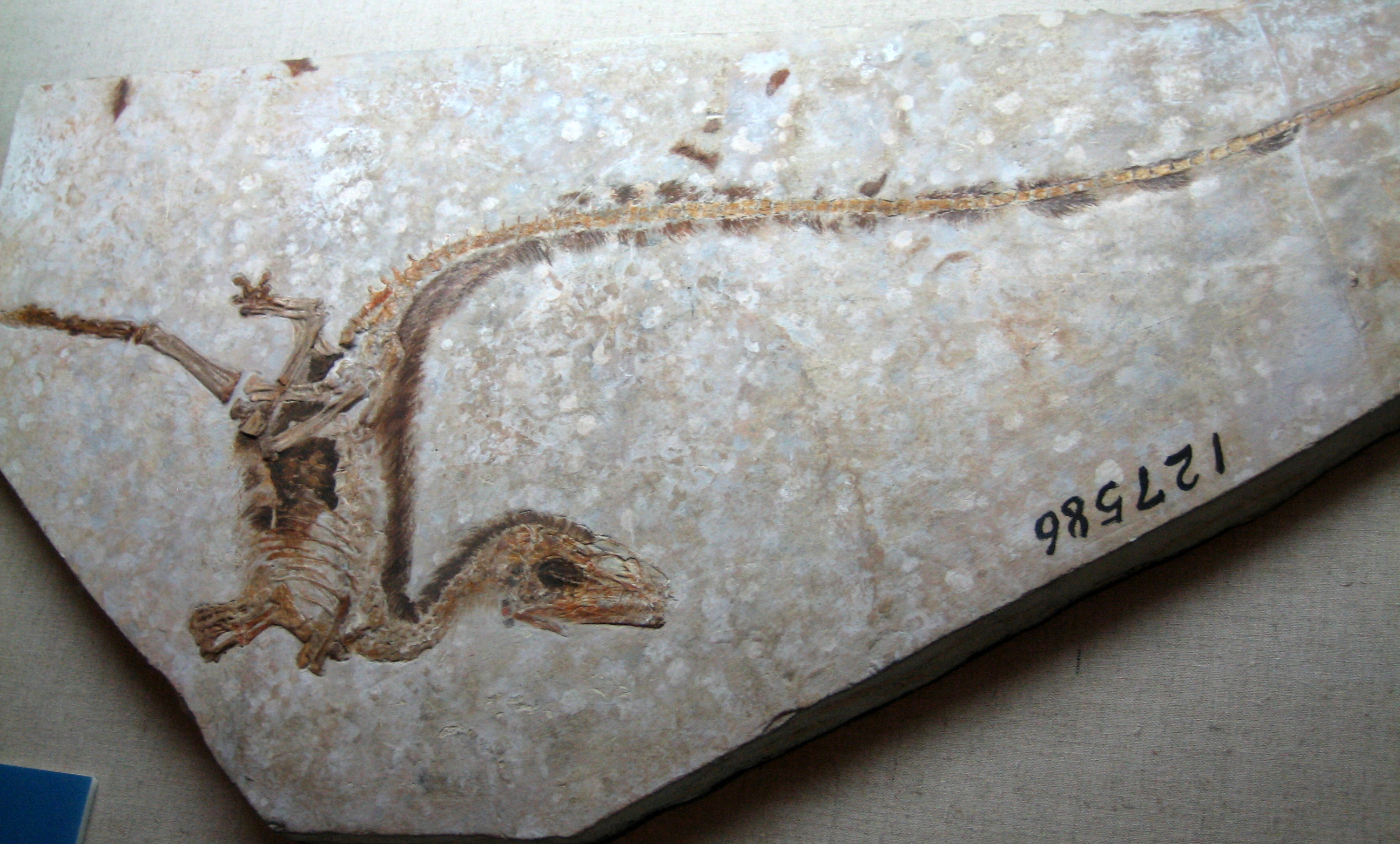
Sinosauropteryx (a compsognathid dinosaur)

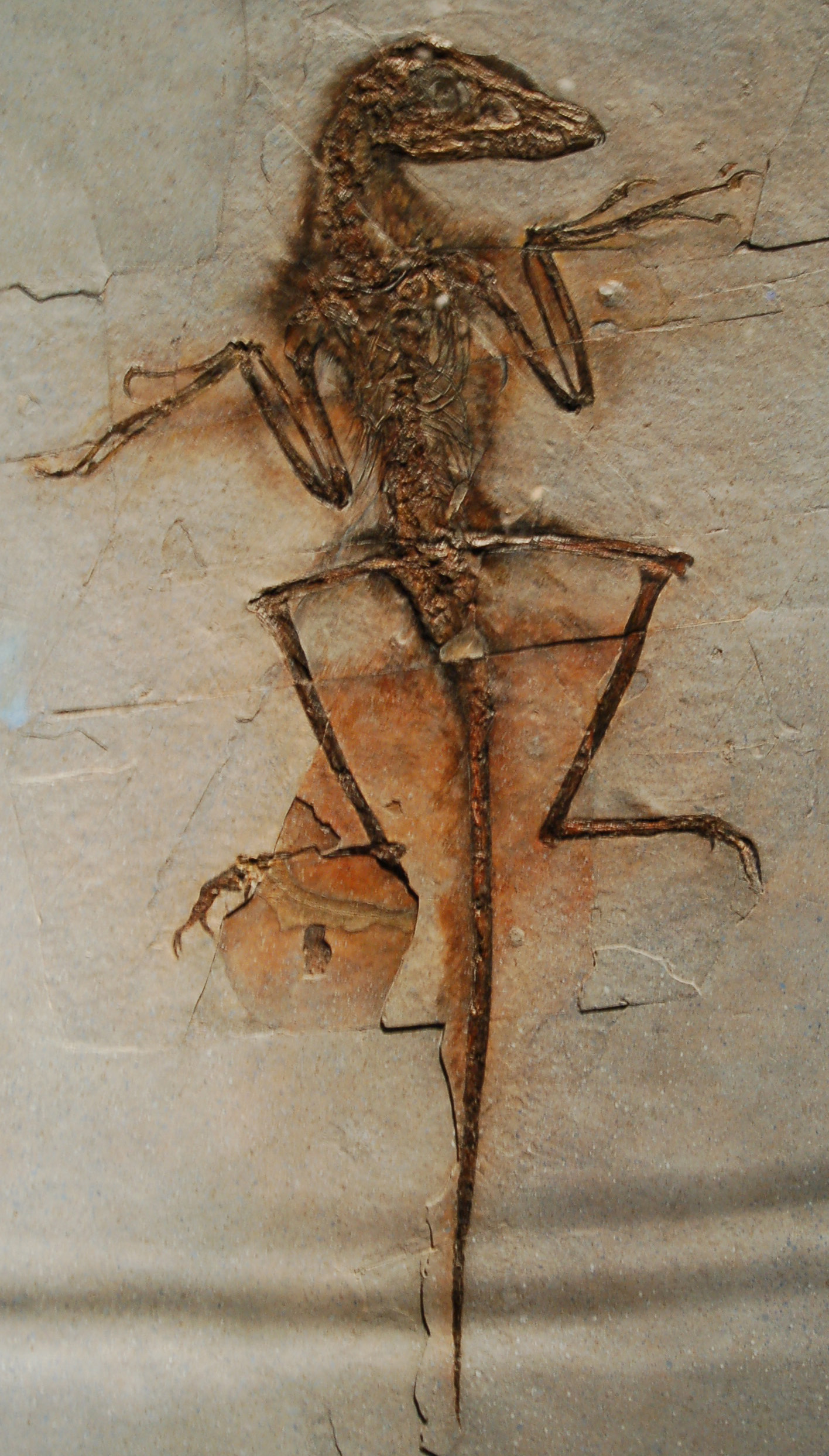
cf. Sinornithosaurus (nicknamed "Dave")

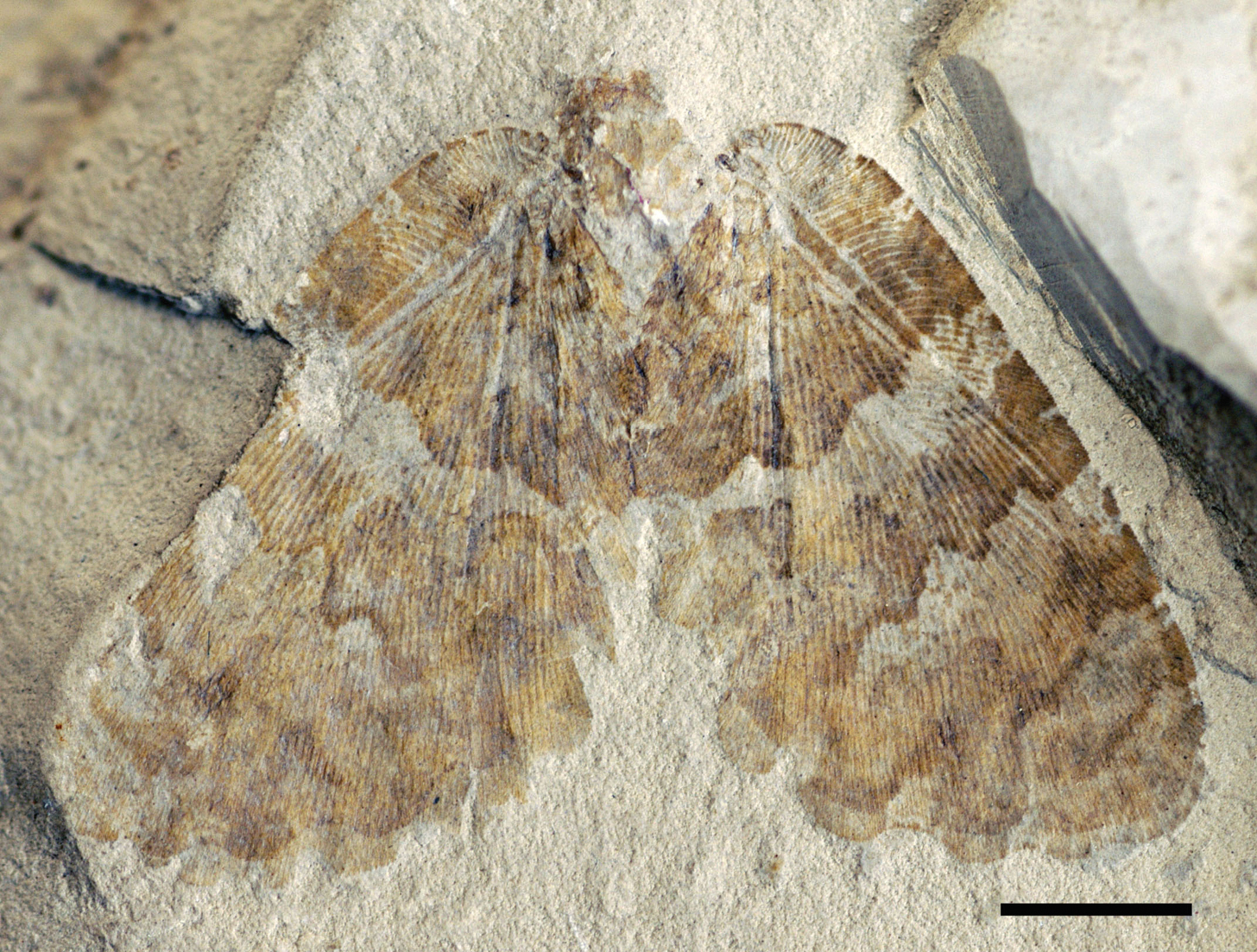
Undulopsychopsis (a lacewing insect)

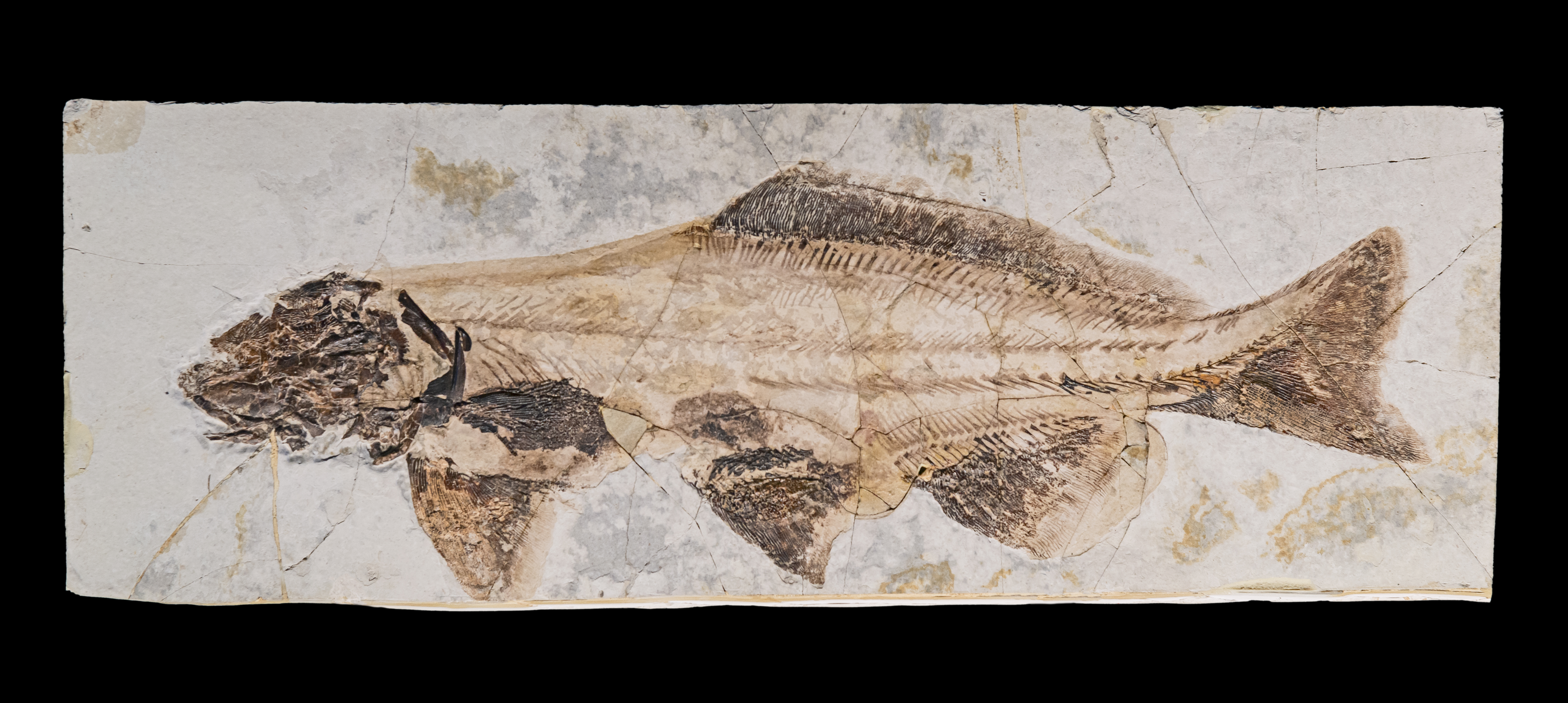
Yanosteus (a freshwater fish)

== See also ==
- List of fossil sites (with link directory)
- List of dinosaur-bearing fossil sites
