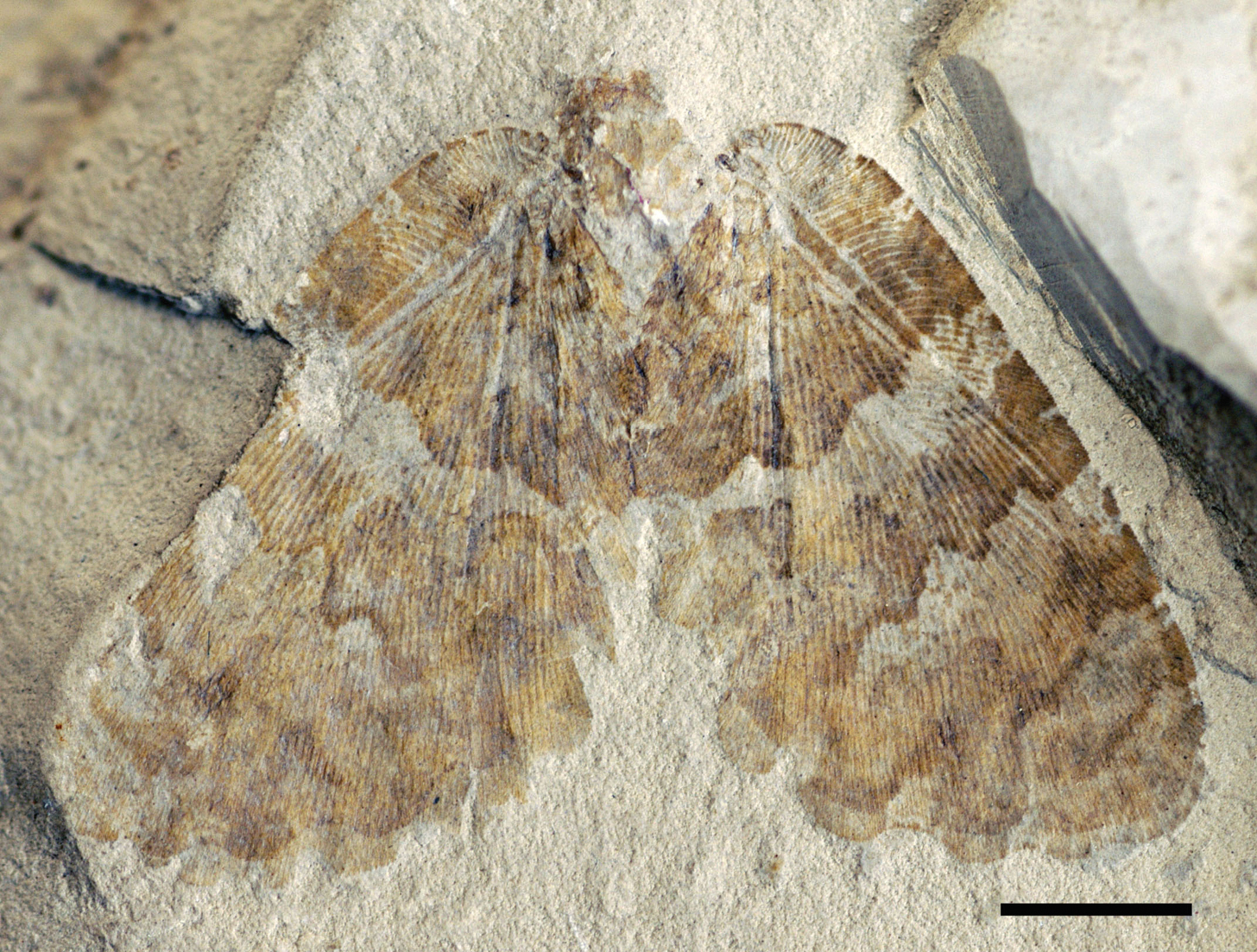

Scientific classification
- Domain: Eukaryota
- Kingdom: Animalia
- Phylum: Arthropoda
- Class: Insecta
- Order: Neuroptera
- Family: Psychopsidae
- Genus: †Undulopsychopsis
- Species: †U. alexi

Binomial name
- †Undulopsychopsis alexi Peng, Makarkin, Wang, & Ren, 2011

= Undulopsychopsis =

Undulopsychopsis Temporal range: Barremian–Aptian, 125–121 Ma

Extinct genus of insects

Undulopsychopsis is an extinct genus of lacewing in the silky lacewing family Psychopsidae. The genus is solely known from a Cretaceous fossil found in China. Currently the genus is composed of a single species, Undulopsychopsis alexi.

== History and classification ==
Undulopsychopsis alexi is known only from one fossil, the part and counterpart holotype, specimen number CYNB044, which is housed in the collections of the Chaoyang Bird Fossil National Geopark Chaoyang, Liaoning, China. The specimen is preserved as a compression fossil in silty yellow to grayish mudstone, dating from the Lower Barremian to Upper Aptian in age, which was recovered from outcrops of the Yixian Formation. Undulopsychopsis was first studied by the paleoentomologists Yuanyuan Peng and Dong Ren from the Capital Normal University in Beijing with Xiaodong Wang from Chaoyang Bird Fossil National Geopark and Vladimir N. Makarkin of the Far Eastern Branch of the Russian Academy of Sciences. Their 2011 type description of the new genus and species was published in the online journal ZooKeys. The genus name Undulopsychopsis was coined by the researchers as a combination of the silky lacewing type genus Psychopsis and the Late Latin word undula meaning "small wave" which is in reference to the distinctly wavy nature of the wing margins. The specific epithet alexi is in honor of the distinguished Russian paleoentomologist Alexandr Pavlovich Rasnitsyn.

The most distinct feature of Undulopsychopsis is the unique undulation of the wing margins, a feature not seen in any other Psychopsidae genus. The branching vein structure seen in Undulopsychopsis is most similar to the Early through Late Cretaceous genus Kagapsychops which has been found in Kazakhstan and Japan. The two genera can be distinguished by the overall size of the species, with Kagapsychops continentalis being two times as long in the forewing as Undulopsychopsis alexi. Kagapsychops also possesses a radial space with a graded group of crossveins. The combination of costal space which lacks numerous crossveins, along with the multi-branched Rs1 and 1A veins, is a feature set found in another extinct Neuropteran family, Osmylopsychopidae. This similarity lead Peng and team to only tentatively place Undulopsychopsis into Psychopsidae, with the caveat that a number of the genera in Psychopsidae should be redescribed to clarify their family affiliation.

== Description ==
The holotype is composed of a single partially complete adult specimen with wings folded. The body itself is very fragmentary with only a portion of the thorax preserved. The visible pronotum is 1.2 millimetres (0.047 in) long and sub-triangular in shape while the mesonotum is 3 mm (0.12 in) in length. Both the pronotum and mesonotum host a number of long hairs. Due to the paired and overlapping nature of the folded wings, much of the hindwing details are obscured and not observable. The hindwings are an estimated 16.5 mm (0.65 in) long and 10 mm (0.39 in) wide, with little to no vein detail visible. The hindwing margins that are visible display the distinct undulation that is seen on the forewings. Subtriangular in shape, the forewings are 12.3 mm (0.48 in) wide and 21.5 mm (0.85 in) long with a uniformly broad coastal space. The hind and outer margins of the forewings are distinctly undulate and entire wing margin is hairy. The veins are notably covered with dense hairs with the hair length increasing towards the wing bases. The radius vein, Rs, in the forewings has ten primary branches, which further branch as they approach the wing margin.
