= Abacetus inexspectatus =

Scientific classification
- Kingdom: Animalia
- Phylum: Arthropoda
- Clade: Pancrustacea
- Class: Insecta
- Order: Coleoptera
- Suborder: Adephaga
- Family: Carabidae
- Subfamily: Pterostichinae
- Tribe: Abacetini
- Genus: Abacetus
- Species: A. inexspectatus

Binomial name
- Abacetus inexspectatus Abdurakhmanov & Kryzhanovskij, 1983

Synonyms
- Abacetus inexpectatus

Species of beetle

Abacetus inexspectatus is a species in the beetle family Carabidae. It is found in Azerbaijan.
