= List of Neuroptera of Sri Lanka =

Sri Lanka is a tropical island situated close to the southern tip of India. The invertebrate fauna there is large as is common in other tropical regions of the world. There are about 2 million species of arthropods found in the world, with more being discovered every year. Thus, it is very complicated and difficult to summarize the exact number of species found within a certain region.

The following list is about Neuroptera recorded in Sri Lanka.

== Lacewing ==
Phylum: Arthropoda
Class: Insecta
Order: Neuroptera

Neuroptera, or net-winged insects, includes the lacewings, mantidflies, antlions, and their relatives. The order contains about 6,000 species. The group was once known as Planipennia, and at that time also included alderflies, fishflies, dobsonflies, and snakeflies, but these are now generally considered to be separate orders (the Megaloptera and Raphidioptera). This is either placed at superorder rank, with the Endopterygota becoming an unranked clade above it, or the Endopterygota are maintained as a superorder, with an unranked Neuropterida being a part of them. Within the endopterygotes, the closest living relatives of the neuropteridan clade are the beetles. The common name lacewings is often used for the most widely known net-winged insects – the green lacewings (Chrysopidae) – but actually most members of the Neuroptera are referred to as some sort of "lacewing".

The following list provide the lacewings currently identified in Sri Lanka. The group is one of the least concerned and identified in Sri Lanka, therefore the exact number of species is unknown.

Endemic species are denoted as E.

=== Family: Ascalaphidae - Owlflies ===
- Ascalaphus dicax
- Ascalaphus sinister
- Suphalomites verbosus

=== Family: Berothidae - Beaded lacewings ===
- Berotha sp.

=== Family: Chrysopidae - Common lacewings ===
- Chrysopa invaria
- Italochrysa aequalis
- Plesiochrysa invaria
- Semachrysa hyndi

=== Family: Coniopterygidae - Dustywings ===
- Coniocampsa indica
- Coniopteryx ambigua
- Coniopteryx ceylonica
- Coniopteryx goniocera
- Coniopteryx indica
- Coniopteryx latistylus
- Coniopteryx portilloi
- Coniopteryx venustula
- Semidalis

=== Family: Hemerobiidae - Brown lacewings ===
- Micromus callidus
- Micromus linearis
- Micromus timidus
- Notiobilla viridivervis
- Psectra iniqua

=== Family: Mantispidae - Mantidflies ===
- Mantispa annulicornis
- Mantispa indica
- Mantispa obscurata
- Mantispa torquilla

=== Family: Myrmeleontidae - Antlion lacewings ===
- Creoleon cinammomeus
- Distoleon audax
- Distoleon dirus
- Hagenomyia nigrinus
- Hagenomyia sagax
- Indoleon barbarus
- Lachlatheles contrarius
- Myrmeleon berenice
- Myrmeleon tenuipennis
- Neuroleon guernei
- Palpares contrarius

=== Family: Osmylidae - Giant lacewings ===
- Spilosmylus ceyloniensis
