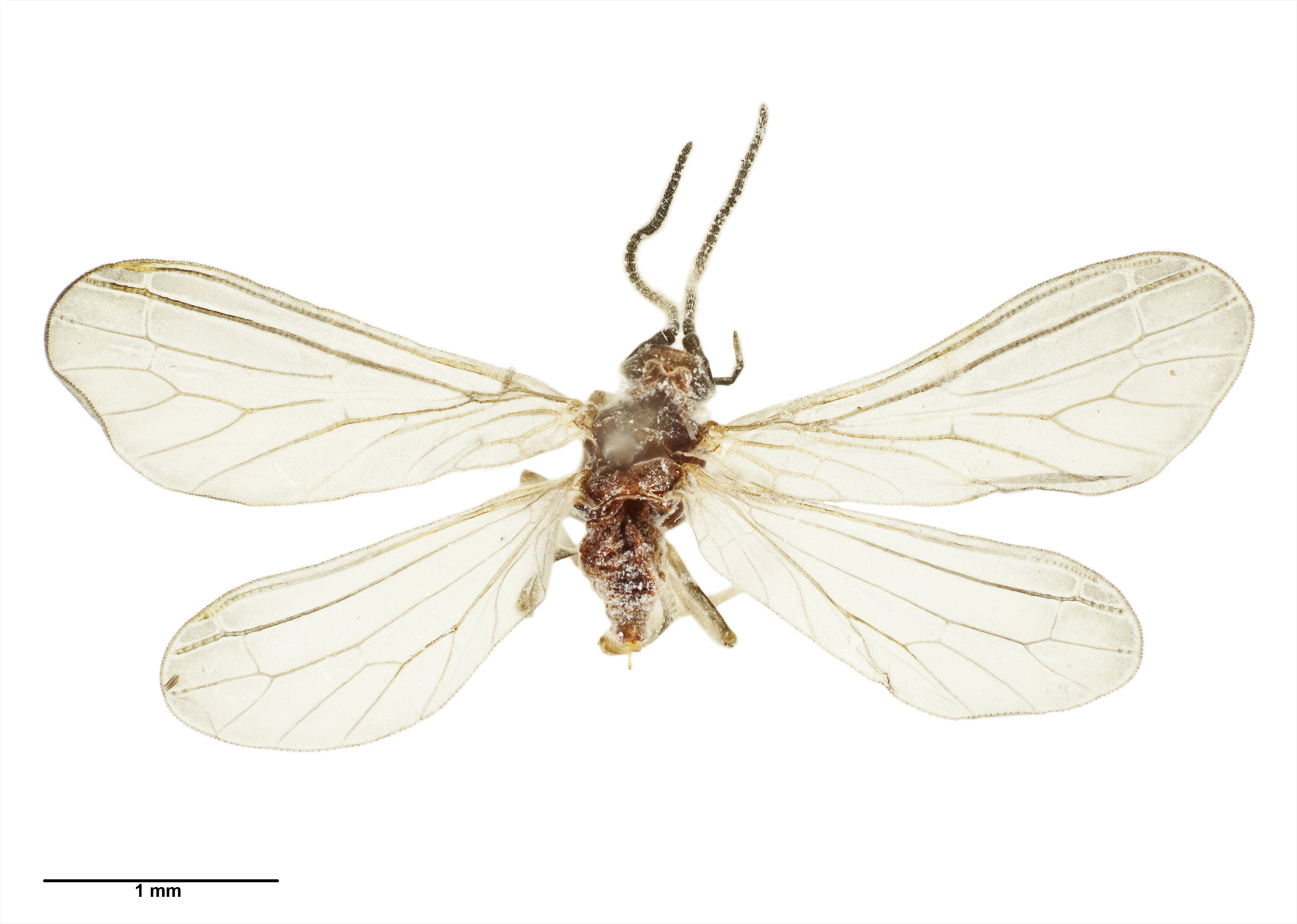
- Cryptoscenea australiensis from New Zealand

Scientific classification
- Kingdom: Animalia
- Phylum: Arthropoda
- Clade: Pancrustacea
- Class: Insecta
- Order: Neuroptera
- Family: Coniopterygidae
- Genus: Cryptoscenea
- Species: C. australiensis

Binomial name
- Cryptoscenea australiensis Enderlein, 1906

Synonyms
- Helicoconis australiensis Enderlein, 1906

= Cryptoscenea australiensis =

Species of insect

Cryptoscenea australiensis is a species of lacewing in the subfamily aleuropteryginae, first described by Günther Enderlein in 1906. No subspecies are listed in the Catalog of Life. The species is present in Eastern Australia, Tasmania and New Zealand, including the Kermadec Islands.

A colony of Cryptoscenea australiensis was first discovered in New Zealand in 1959, with the species surviving due to larval predation on mealybug eggs. Both adults and larvae have been shown predating on mealybugs in apple orchards, with adults also being seen predating on mites.
