= Isostenosmylus irroratus =

Scientific classification
- Domain: Eukaryota
- Kingdom: Animalia
- Phylum: Arthropoda
- Class: Insecta
- Order: Neuroptera
- Family: Osmylidae
- Genus: Isostenosmylus
- Species: I. irroratus

Binomial name
- Isostenosmylus irroratus Martins, Ardila-Camacho & Aspöck, 2016

Species of insect

Isostenosmylus irroratus is a species of neotropical osmylid.
