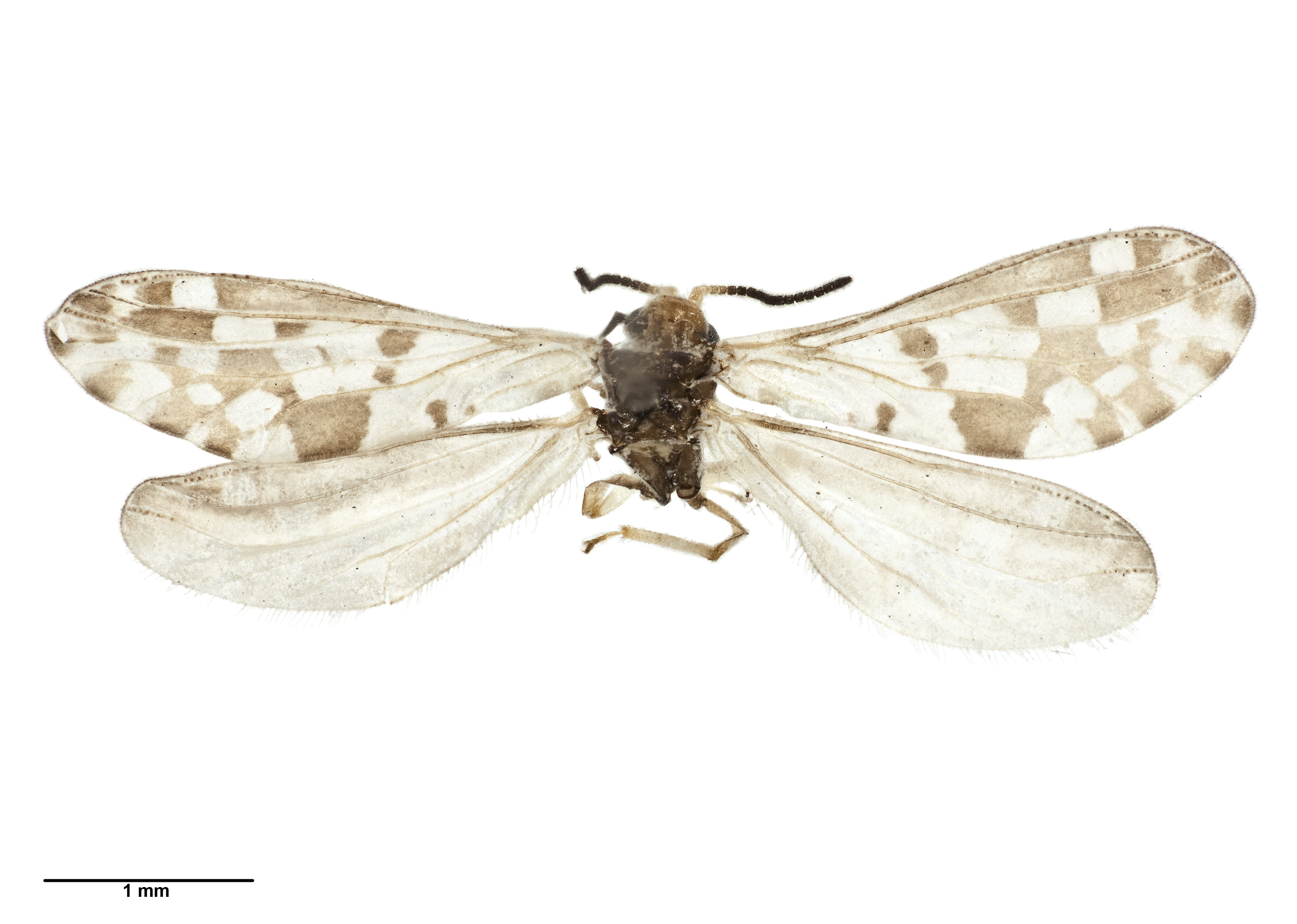

Scientific classification
- Domain: Eukaryota
- Kingdom: Animalia
- Phylum: Arthropoda
- Class: Insecta
- Order: Neuroptera
- Family: Coniopterygidae
- Genus: Heteroconis
- Species: H. ornata

Binomial name
- Heteroconis ornata (Enderlein, 1905)

= Heteroconis ornata =

Species of insect

Heteroconis ornata is a species of Australian lacewing that was first described by Günther Enderlein in 1905. The species is found in Queensland and New South Wales. The species was first recorded in New Zealand in 1988, and by the late 1980s a small colony was found to be established in West Auckland.

== Gallery ==
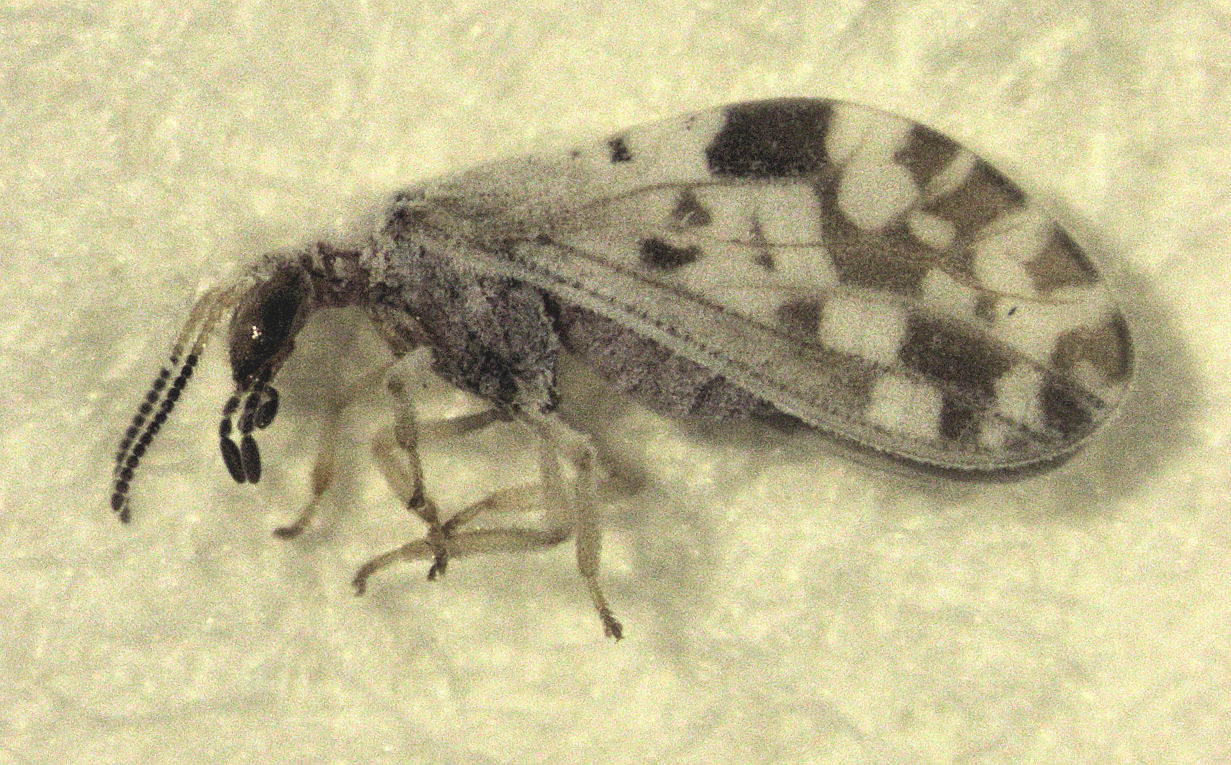
Adult Heteroconis ornata

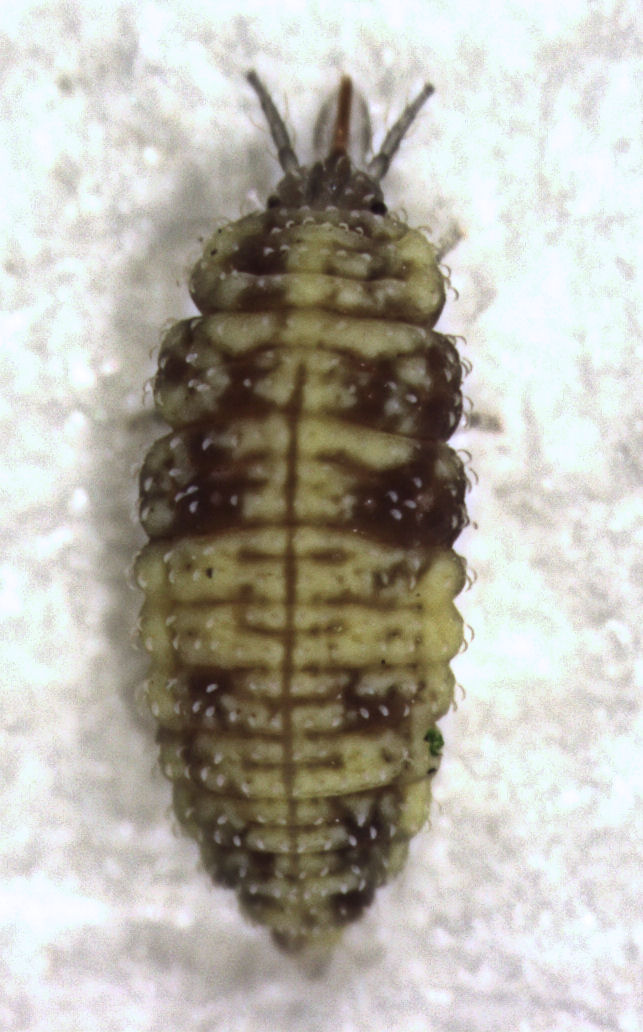
Heteroconis ornata larva found on a rimu tree

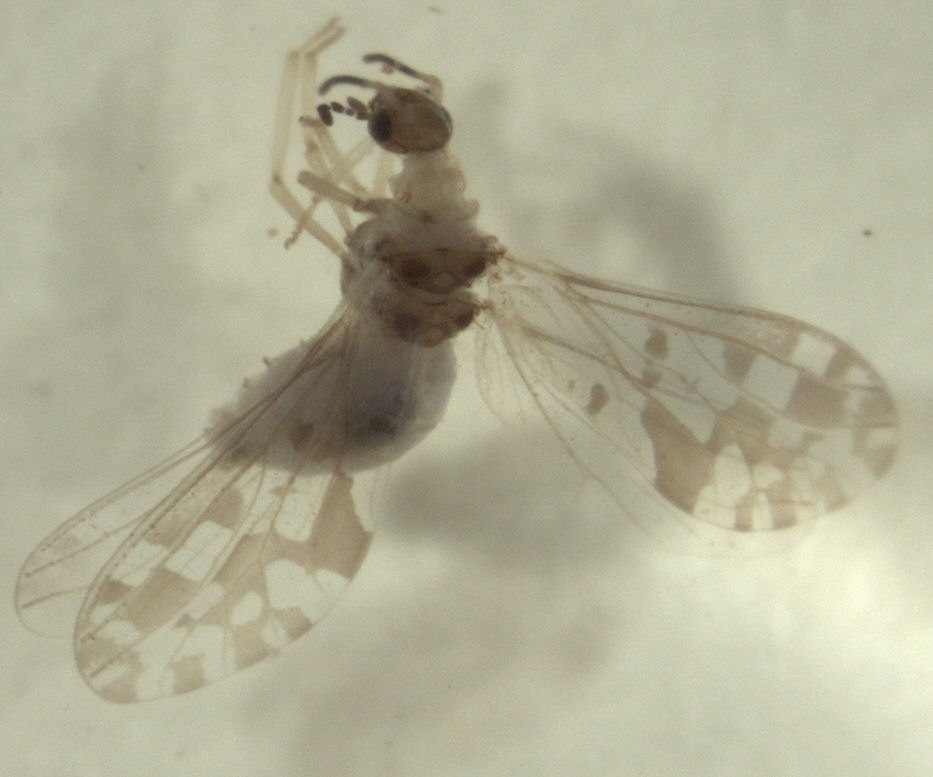
Adult Heteroconis ornata
