= Vetosmylus =

Vetosmylus Temporal range: Aalenian–Bajocian

Scientific classification
- Domain: Eukaryota
- Kingdom: Animalia
- Phylum: Arthropoda
- Class: Insecta
- Order: Neuroptera
- Family: Osmylidae
- Subfamily: Osmylinae
- Genus: †Vetosmylus; Ma et al., 2020

Species
- Vetosmylus tentus; Vetosmylus maculosus

Extinct genus of lacewing

Vetosmylus is an extinct genus of lance lacewing from the Middle Jurassic. Both species were described from the Jiulongshan Formation near Daohugou Village, China, which dates back to the Aalenian–Bajocian boundary. It bears close resemblance to extant genera, particularly Parosmylus. The well-preserved female genitalia of V. maculosus are extremely similar to that of Parosmylus. Vetosmylus is the oldest member of the subfamily Osmylinae thus far known, significantly extending its temporal range. No unambiguous representatives exist between Vetosmylus and an Osmyline from the Eocene-aged Florissant formation, suggesting there is a heretofore unknown ghost lineage in between.
