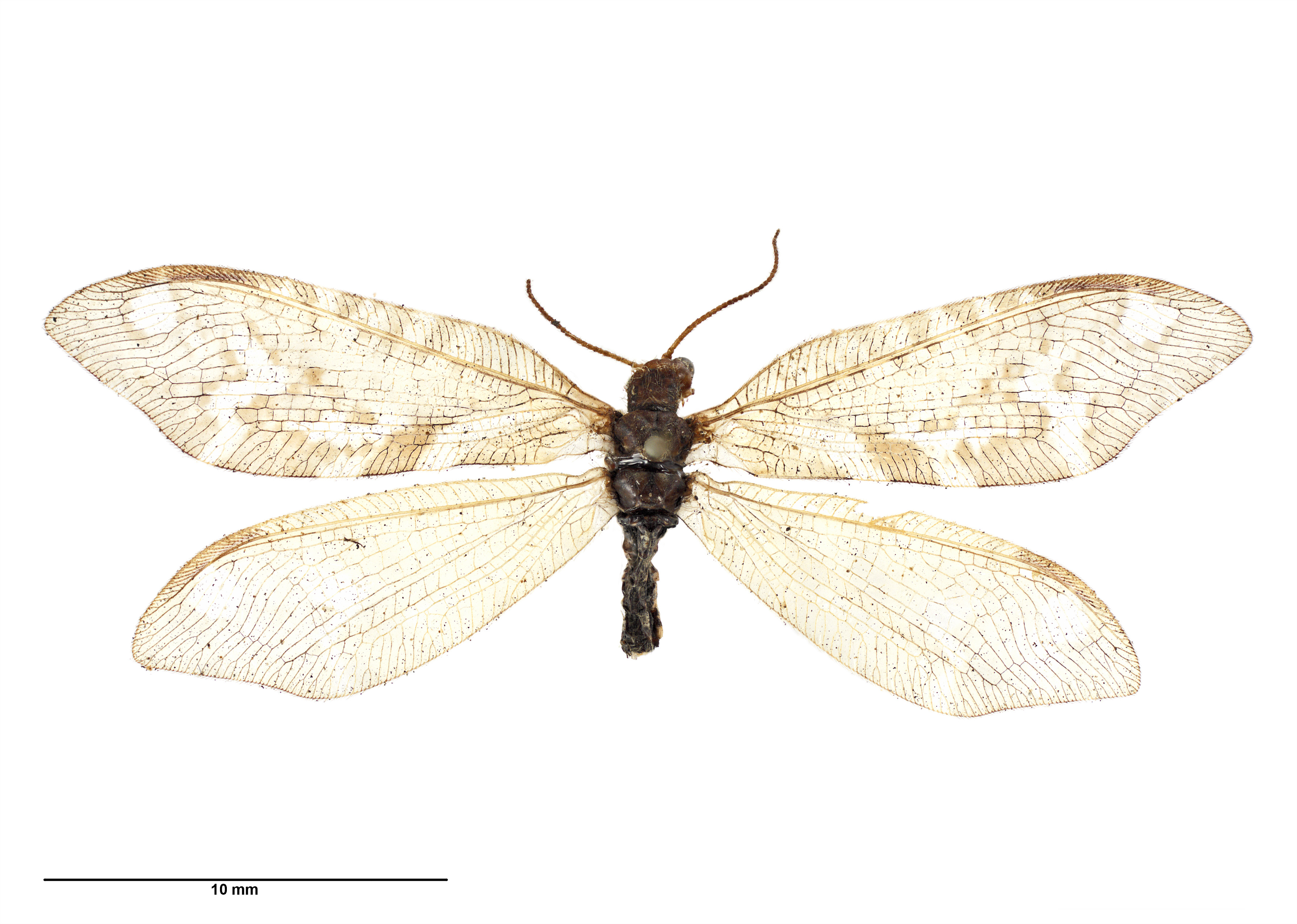

Scientific classification
- Domain: Eukaryota
- Kingdom: Animalia
- Phylum: Arthropoda
- Class: Insecta
- Order: Neuroptera
- Family: Osmylidae
- Subfamily: Kempyninae
- Genus: Euosmylus; Krueger, 1913
- Species: E. stellae

Binomial name
- Euosmylus stellae (McLachlan, 1899)

Synonyms
- Stenosmylus stellae McLachlan, 1899; Stenosmylus stellae var. obliteratus McLachlan, 1899; Euosmylus stellae var. obliteratus (McLachlan, 1899); Euosmylus stellae var. connexus (McLachlan, 1899); Kempynus stellae (McLachlan, 1899); Stenosmylus stellae var. connexus McLachlan, 1899

= Euosmylus =

Genus of insect

Euosmylus stellae is an endemic species of New Zealand lacewing that was first described by Robert McLachlan in 1899. It is the only species in the genus Euosmylus. The species ranges from the North Island Volcanic Plateau to the middle of the South Island, including Arthur's Pass and the Ashley Gorge. It was named in honour of George Hudson's daughter Stella.

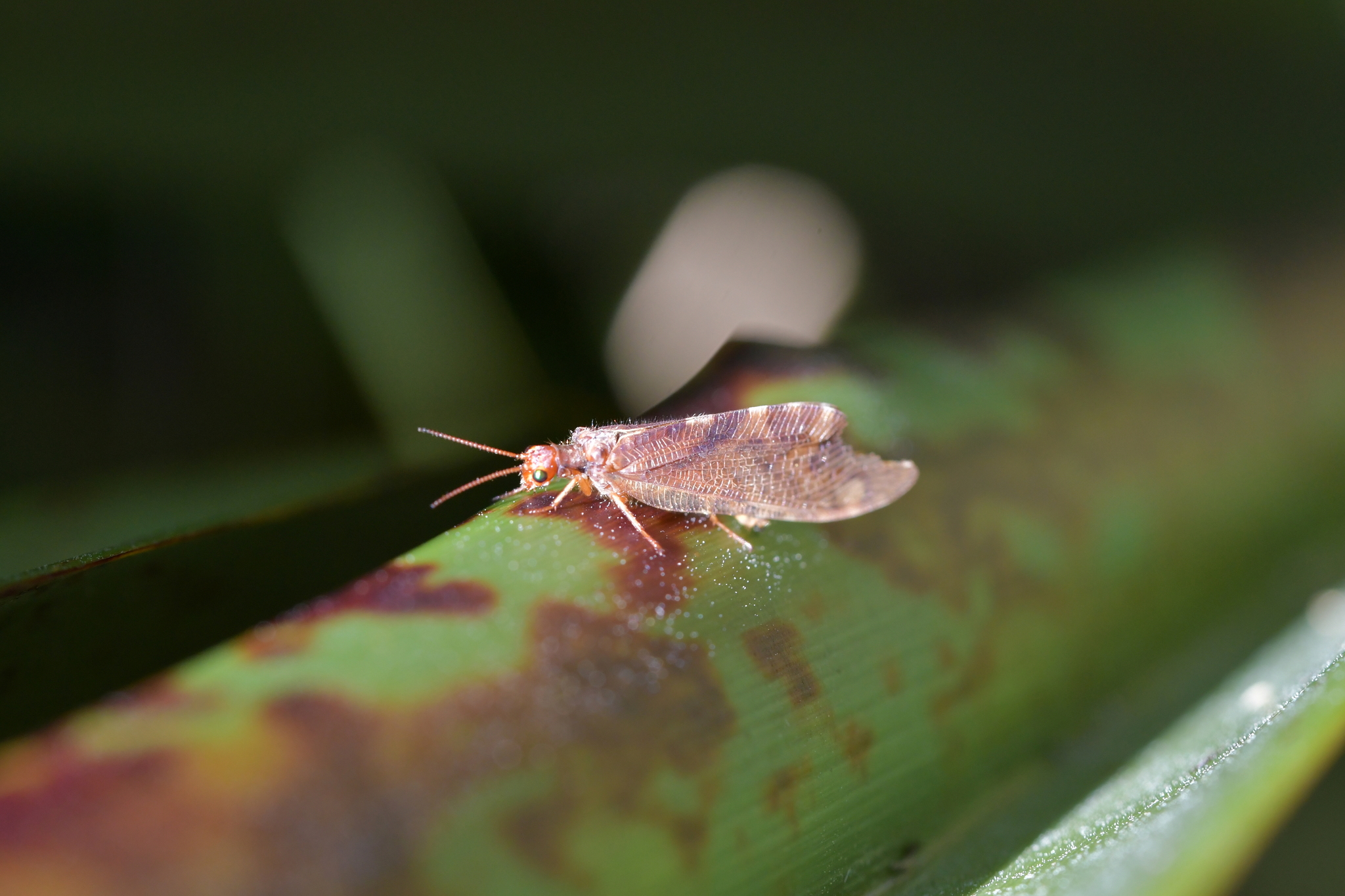
Euosmylus stellae
