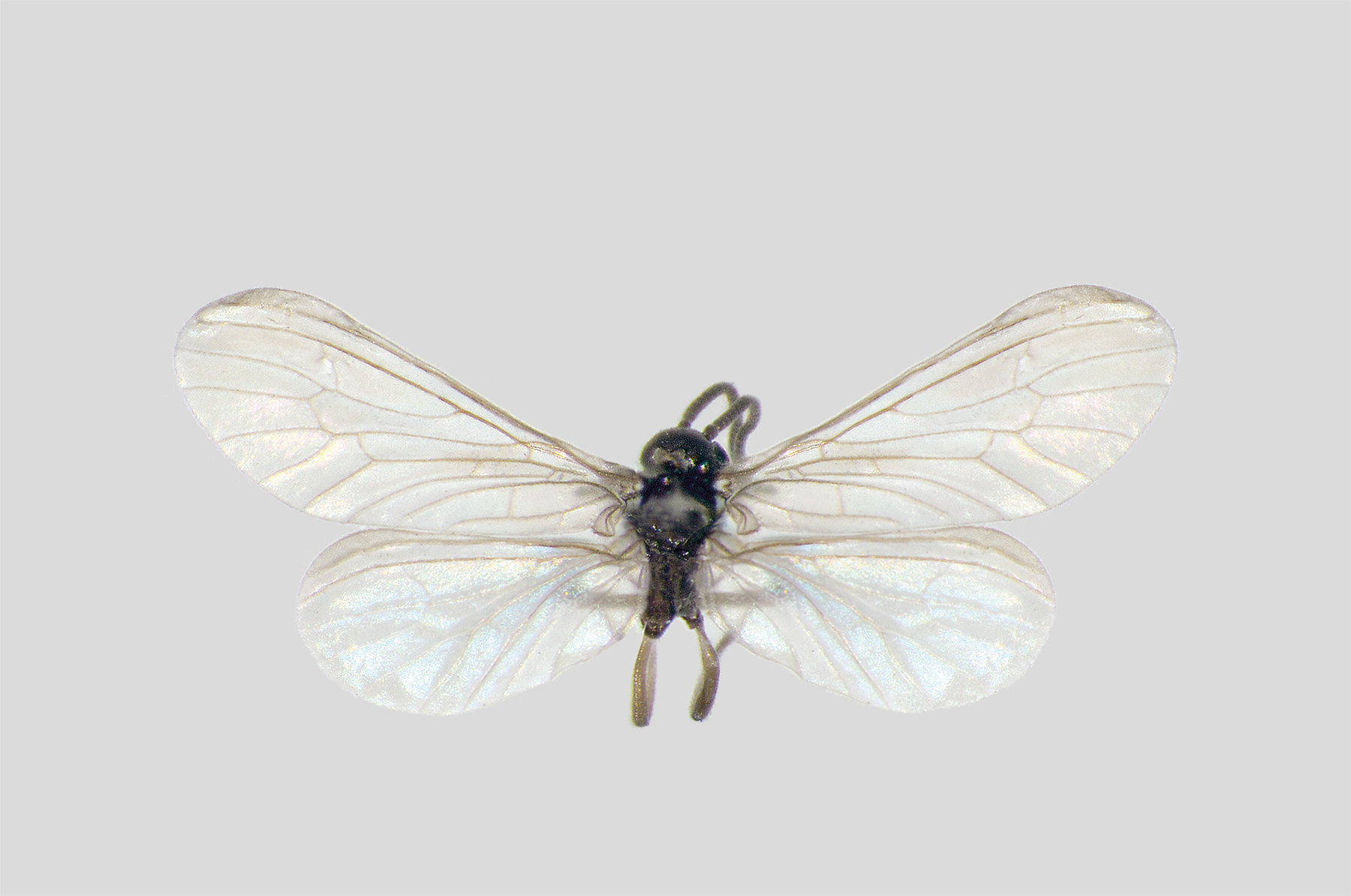
- Parasemidalis

Scientific classification
- Kingdom: Animalia
- Phylum: Arthropoda
- Clade: Pancrustacea
- Class: Insecta
- Order: Neuroptera
- Family: Coniopterygidae
- Genus: Parasemidalis; Enderlein, 1905

= Parasemidalis =

Genus of insects

Parasemidalis is a genus of insects belonging to the family Coniopterygidae.

The species of this genus are found in Europe and Northern America.

Species:

- Parasemidalis alluaudina (Navás, 1912)
- Parasemidalis enriquei Sziráki, 2009
