= Neoconis =

Scientific classification
- Domain: Eukaryota
- Kingdom: Animalia
- Phylum: Arthropoda
- Class: Insecta
- Order: Neuroptera
- Family: Coniopterygidae
- Subfamily: Aleuropteryginae
- Genus: Neoconis; Enderlein, 1930

Genus of lacewings

Neoconis is a genus of lacewing.

== Species ==
- Neoconis amazonica Meinander, 1983
- Neoconis bifurcata Meinander, 1974
- Neoconis bispina Meinander, 1972
- Neoconis brasiliensis Meinander, 1980
- Neoconis cubana (Banks, 1938)
- Neoconis dentata Meinander, 1972
- Neoconis garleppi (Enderlein, 1906)
- Neoconis gelesae Monserrat, 1981
- Neoconis inexpectata Meinander, 1972
- Neoconis insulana (Meinander, 1974)
- Neoconis marginata Meinander, 1972
- Neoconis paleocaribis† Grimaldi & Engel in Grimaldi, Engel, Nascimbene & Singh, 2013
- Neoconis pistrix (Enderlein, 1906)
- Neoconis presai Monserrat, 1983
- Neoconis szirakii Sarmiento-Cordero & Contreras-Ramos, 2019
- Neoconis tubifera Meinander, 1980
- Neoconis unam Monserrat, 1985
- Neoconis unicornis Meinander, 1990
