= Stenosmylinae =

Scientific classification
- Domain: Eukaryota
- Kingdom: Animalia
- Phylum: Arthropoda
- Class: Insecta
- Order: Neuroptera
- Family: Osmylidae
- Subfamily: Stenosmylinae

Genera
- See text

Subfamily of insects

Stenosmylinae is a subfamily of neotropical osmylid.

== Genera ==
Genera accepted within Stenosmylinae include:

- Isostenosmylus Navás, 1912
- Phymatosmylus Adams, 1969
