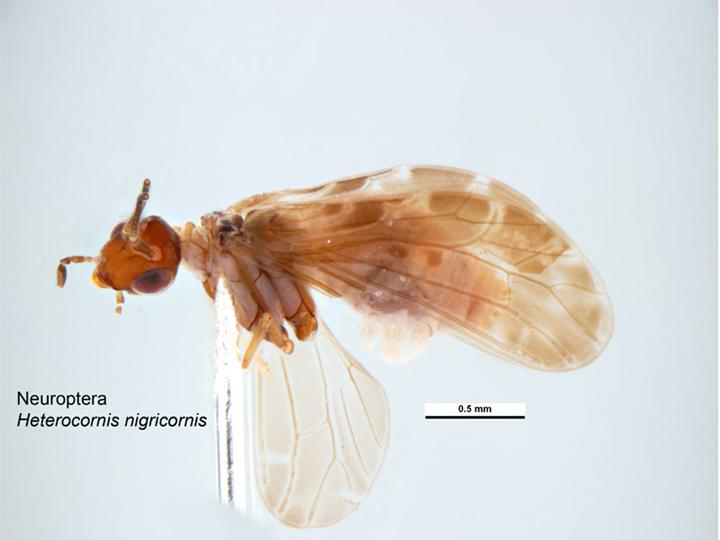
- Heteroconis nigricornis

Scientific classification
- Kingdom: Animalia
- Phylum: Arthropoda
- Clade: Pancrustacea
- Class: Insecta
- Order: Neuroptera
- Family: Coniopterygidae
- Subfamily: Aleuropteryginae
- Genus: Heteroconis; Enderlein, 1905

Synonyms
- Niphadicera Withycombe, 1925

= Heteroconis =

Genus of insects

Heteroconis is a genus of lacewings belonging to the family Coniopterygidae.

The species of this genus are found in Southeastern Asia, Australia and New Zealand.

== Species ==
The following species are recognised in the genus Heteroconis:

- Heteroconis acuticauda Sziráki, 2004
- Heteroconis aethiopica Monserrat, 1989
- Heteroconis africana Monserrat & Díaz-Aranda, 1988
- Heteroconis allisoni New, 1988
- Heteroconis amoena Tjeder, 1973
- Heteroconis angustipennis Monserrat, 1982
- Heteroconis argylensis New, 1987
- Heteroconis axeli New, 1988
- Heteroconis bifurcata Meinander, 1990
- Heteroconis candida Tjeder, 1973
- Heteroconis cornuta Monserrat, 1982
- Heteroconis curvata Meinander, 1990
- Heteroconis dahli Enderlein, 1906
- Heteroconis editae Sziráki, 2002
- Heteroconis electrina Z.-q.Liu et al., 2004
- Heteroconis enarotadiensis New, 1990
- Heteroconis enderleini Meinander, 1972
- Heteroconis fenestrata New, 1990
- Heteroconis flavicornuta Tjeder, 1973
- Heteroconis fumipennis Tjeder, 1973
- Heteroconis fusca Meinander, 1972
- Heteroconis gagnei New, 1988
- Heteroconis hainanica Z.-q.Liu et al., 2004
- Heteroconis helenae Sziráki, 2001
- Heteroconis interrupta (Banks, 1937)
- Heteroconis iriana Tjeder, 1973
- Heteroconis javanica Monserrat, 1982
- Heteroconis kaindiensis New, 1990
- Heteroconis kaitensis New, 1990
- Heteroconis maculata Meinander, 1969
- Heteroconis madangensis Meinander, 1990
- Heteroconis monserrati Sziráki, 2001
- Heteroconis nigricornis Meinander, 1969
- Heteroconis nigripalpis Meinander, 1972
- Heteroconis nigripennis Meinander, 1969
- Heteroconis orbicularis Zhao, Sziráki & Liu, 2022
- Heteroconis ornata Enderlein, 1905
- Heteroconis papuensis Meinander, 1990
- Heteroconis pennyi Meinander, 1990
- Heteroconis pepa Monserrat, 1982
- Heteroconis picticornis (Banks, 1939)
- Heteroconis pioraensis New, 1990
- Heteroconis planifrontalis Meinander, 1969
- Heteroconis pulchra Meinander, 1972
- Heteroconis rieki Meinander, 1972
- Heteroconis sakaeratica Sziráki, 2002
- Heteroconis serripyga Meinander, 1972
- Heteroconis smithersi Meinander, 1969
- Heteroconis spinosa New, 1990
- Heteroconis striata New, 1990
- Heteroconis subanalis Meinander, 1972
- Heteroconis tanzaniae Meinander, 1998
- Heteroconis terminalis (Banks, 1913)
- Heteroconis thawati Sziráki, 2004
- Heteroconis toxopei Tjeder, 1973
- Heteroconis tricornis Z.-q.Liu et al., 2004
- Heteroconis umbrata New, 1990
- Heteroconis unicornis Z.-q.Liu et al., 2004
- Heteroconis varia Enderlein, 1906
- Heteroconis vietnamensis Meinander, 1990
- Heteroconis wauensis New, 1988
- Heteroconis wilhelmensis New, 1990
- Heteroconis yunnanensis Zhao, Sziráki & Liu, 2022
