= Burmaleon =

Burmaleon Temporal range: Cenomanian

Scientific classification
- Domain: Eukaryota
- Kingdom: Animalia
- Phylum: Arthropoda
- Class: Insecta
- Order: Neuroptera
- Family: Osmylidae
- Genus: †Burmaleon
- Species: †B. magnificus

Binomial name
- †Burmaleon magnificus Myskowiak et al, 2016

Extinct genus of insects

Burmaleon is an extinct genus of lacewing in the family Osmylidae known from fossils found in Asia. The genus contains a single species, Burmaleon magnificus.

== History and classification ==
When first described, R. cratoensis was known from a pair of fossil adults, the holotype number "HUANG-BP-B-4220" and paratype number "HUANG-NIGP163028". At the time of the insects' description, the two specimens were residing in the Chinese Academy of Sciences's Nanjing Institute of Geology and Paleontology, in Nanjing. Both the winged adults are preserved as inclusions in transparent chunks of yellow Burmese amber shaped and polished before study. The amber specimen was recovered from the amber deposits of Hukawng Valley, Kachin State in Myanmar. The specific origin location for the fossils is unidentified since the amber pieces were obtained from traders after mining. Burmese amber has been radiometrically dated using U-Pb isotopes, yielding an age of approximately 98.79 ± 0.62 million years old, close to the Aptian – Cenomanian boundary, in the earliest Cenomanian.

The fossils were described in a 2016 paper by an international team of paleontologists led by Justine Myskowiak. The genus name is a combination of Burma, referring to the type location in Burmese amber, and leon, a common suffix name for myrmeleontoid insects. They coined the specific epithet magnificus in reference to the great detail of preservation seen in the fossils.

== Description ==
The species have a full body length ranging between approximately 10–12 mm (0.39–0.47 in), and both are mostly complete. On the holotype, the whole individual is preserved except three of the legs, while the paratype has only body, antennae and wings present. The heads are wider than long, with medium compound eyes positioned on the sides and no ocelli present. The antennae are thread- like in appearance and at least half as long as the fore-wings. The legs are slender and attached to the 1.0 mm (0.039 in) long prothorax, with all the legs showing distinct apical spurs on the tibia. The 15.0–15.5 mm (0.59–0.61 in) long forewings are a hyaline with a brown pterostigma and brown venation, but no color patterning. There are small trichosors present along the apical rear edges of the forewings, but unlike the modern genus Gumilla, nygmata are not present on any of the wings. The Rs vein of all four wings have six distinct branches and the positioning of the first branch is near the center point of the wing. In the fore-wings the area between the costa vein and the ScP is narrow as is the area between the costal margin and the combined subcostal plus radial veins.
