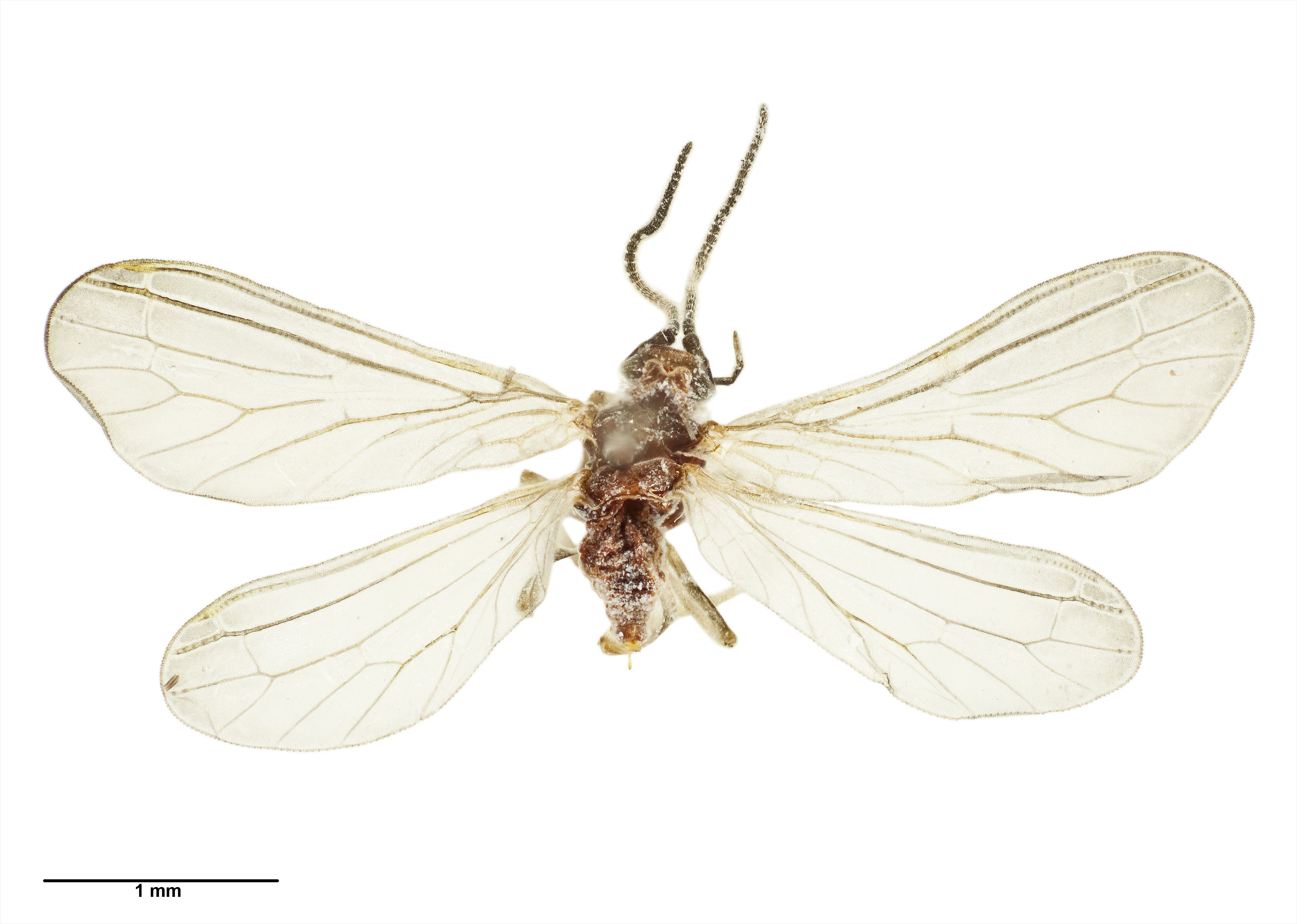
- Cryptoscenea australiensis

Scientific classification
- Kingdom: Animalia
- Phylum: Arthropoda
- Clade: Pancrustacea
- Class: Insecta
- Order: Neuroptera
- Family: Coniopterygidae
- Subfamily: Aleuropteryginae
- Genus: Cryptoscenea; Enderlein, 1914

= Cryptoscenea =

Genus of insects

Cryptoscenea is a genus of lacewings belonging to the family Coniopterygidae.

Species of this genus are found in New Zealand and non-desert areas of Australia (only in the east and west).

== Species ==
Species:

- Cryptoscenea antennalis Meinander, 1972
- Cryptoscenea australiensis Enderlein, 1906
- Cryptoscenea diversicornis Sziráki, 2001
- Cryptoscenea evansorum Smithers, 1984
- Cryptoscenea hoelzeli Sziráki, 1997
- Cryptoscenea maior Sziráki & Winterton, 2012
- Cryptoscenea novaeguineensis Meinander, 1972
- Cryptoscenea obscurior Meinander, 1972
- Cryptoscenea ohmi Sziráki, 1997
- Cryptoscenea orientalis C.K. Yang & Z.Q. Liu, 1993
- Cryptoscenea serrata Meinander, 1979
- Cryptoscenea stylaris Sziráki & van Harten, 2006
- Cryptoscenea tanzaniae Meinander, 1998
