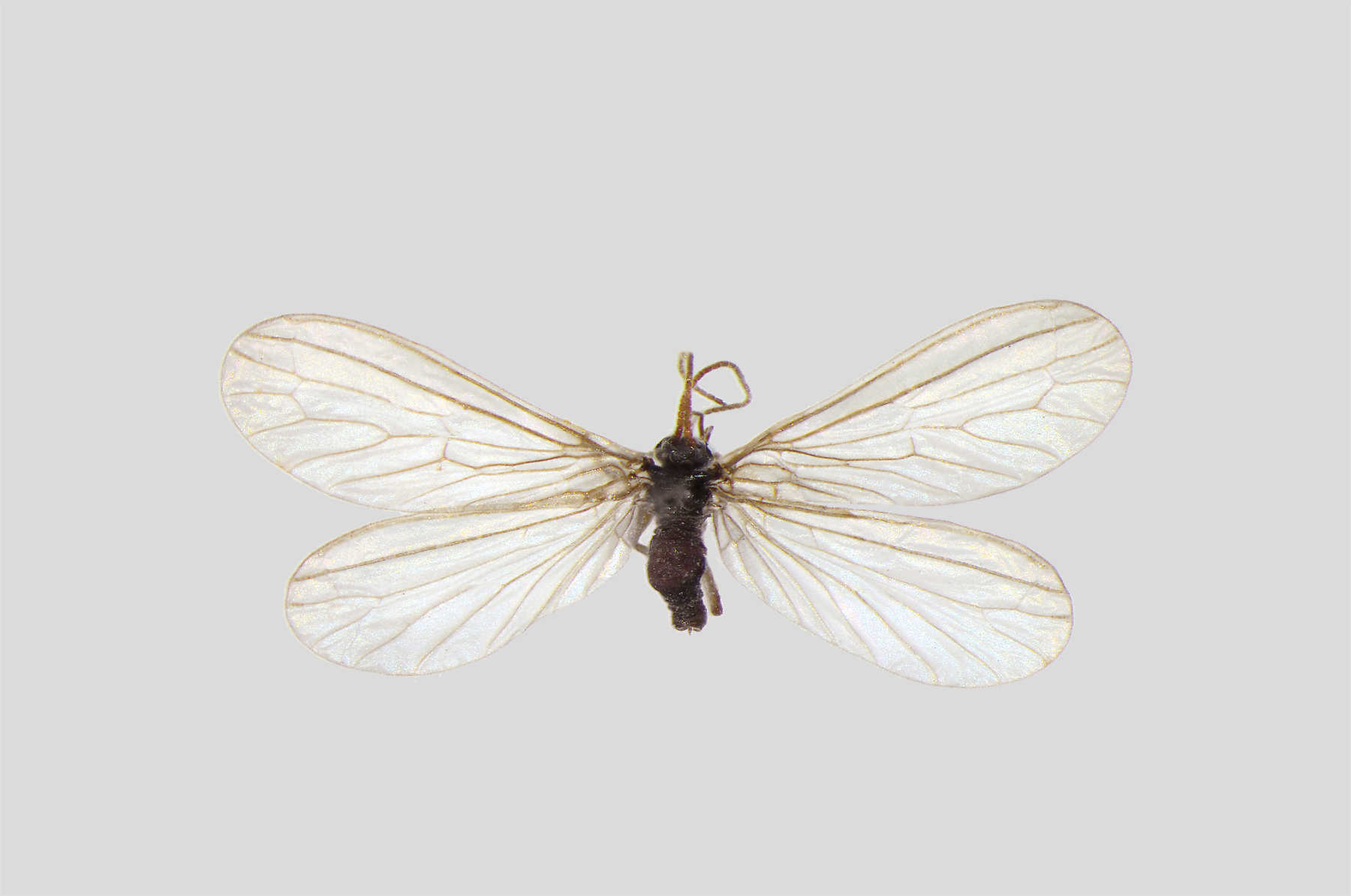
- A preserved specimen of H. lutea

Scientific classification
- Kingdom: Animalia
- Phylum: Arthropoda
- Clade: Pancrustacea
- Class: Insecta
- Order: Neuroptera
- Family: Coniopterygidae
- Subfamily: Aleuropteryginae
- Genus: Helicoconis; Enderlein, 1905

= Helicoconis =

Genus of insects

Helicoconis is a genus of insects belonging to the family Coniopterygidae.

The species of this genus are found in Europe, Southern Africa and Northern America.

Species:

- Helicoconis algirica Meinander, 1976
- Helicoconis aptera Messner, 1965
