= Spiloconis =

Scientific classification
- Domain: Eukaryota
- Kingdom: Animalia
- Phylum: Arthropoda
- Class: Insecta
- Order: Neuroptera
- Family: Coniopterygidae
- Subfamily: Aleuropteryginae
- Genus: Spiloconis; Enderlein, 1907

Genus of lacewings

Spiloconis is a genus of lacewing.

== Species ==
- Spiloconis cerata (Hagen, 1858)
- Spiloconis eominuta† Grimaldi & Engel in Grimaldi, Engel, Nascimbene & Singh, 2013
- Spiloconis fijiensis Meinander, 1990
- Spiloconis glaesaria† Meinander, 1998
- Spiloconis maculata (Enderlein, 1906)
- Spiloconis notata (Navás, 1926)
- Spiloconis oediloma† Engel & Grimaldi, 2007
- Spiloconis sexguttata Enderlein, 1907
