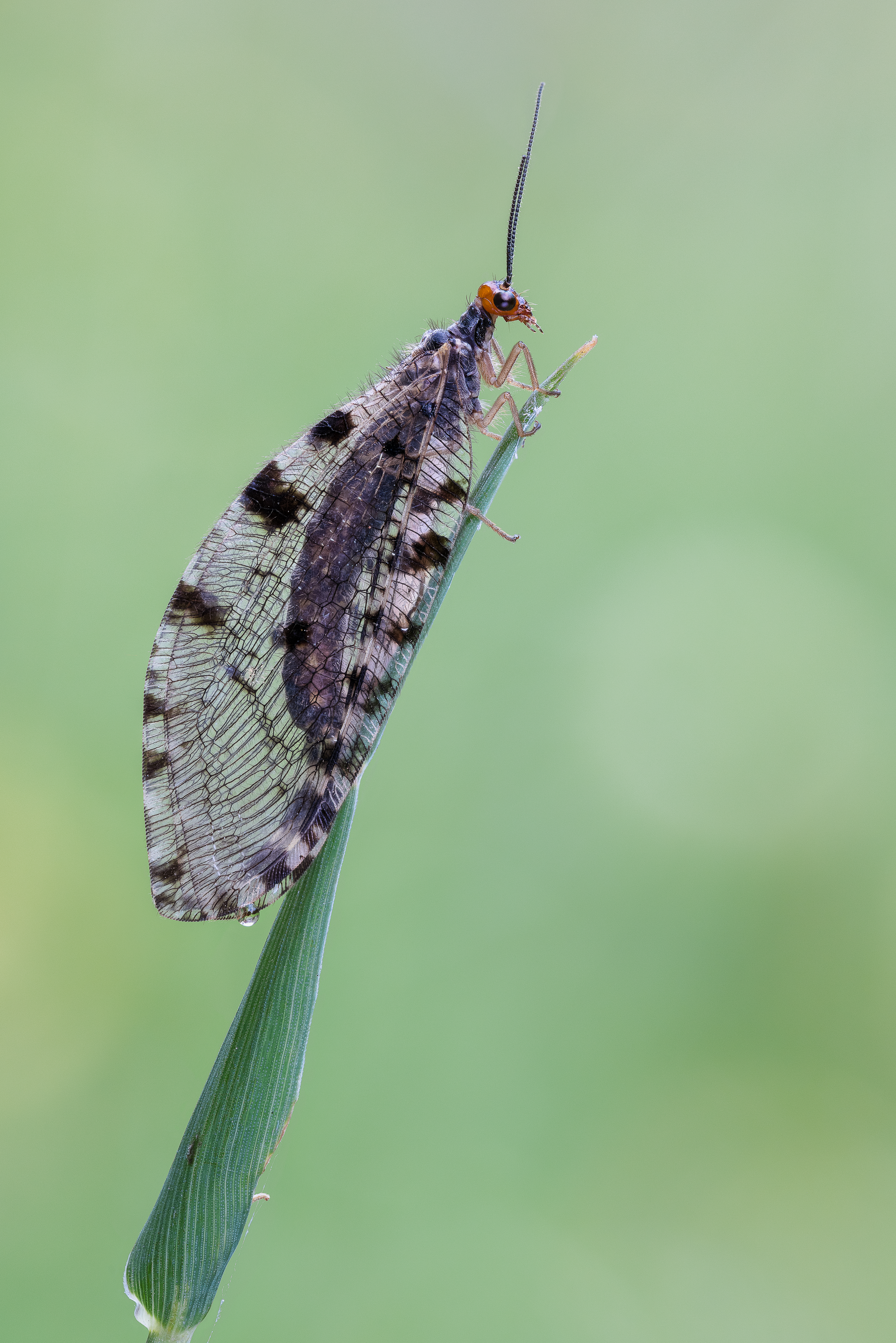
- Osmylus fulvicephalus
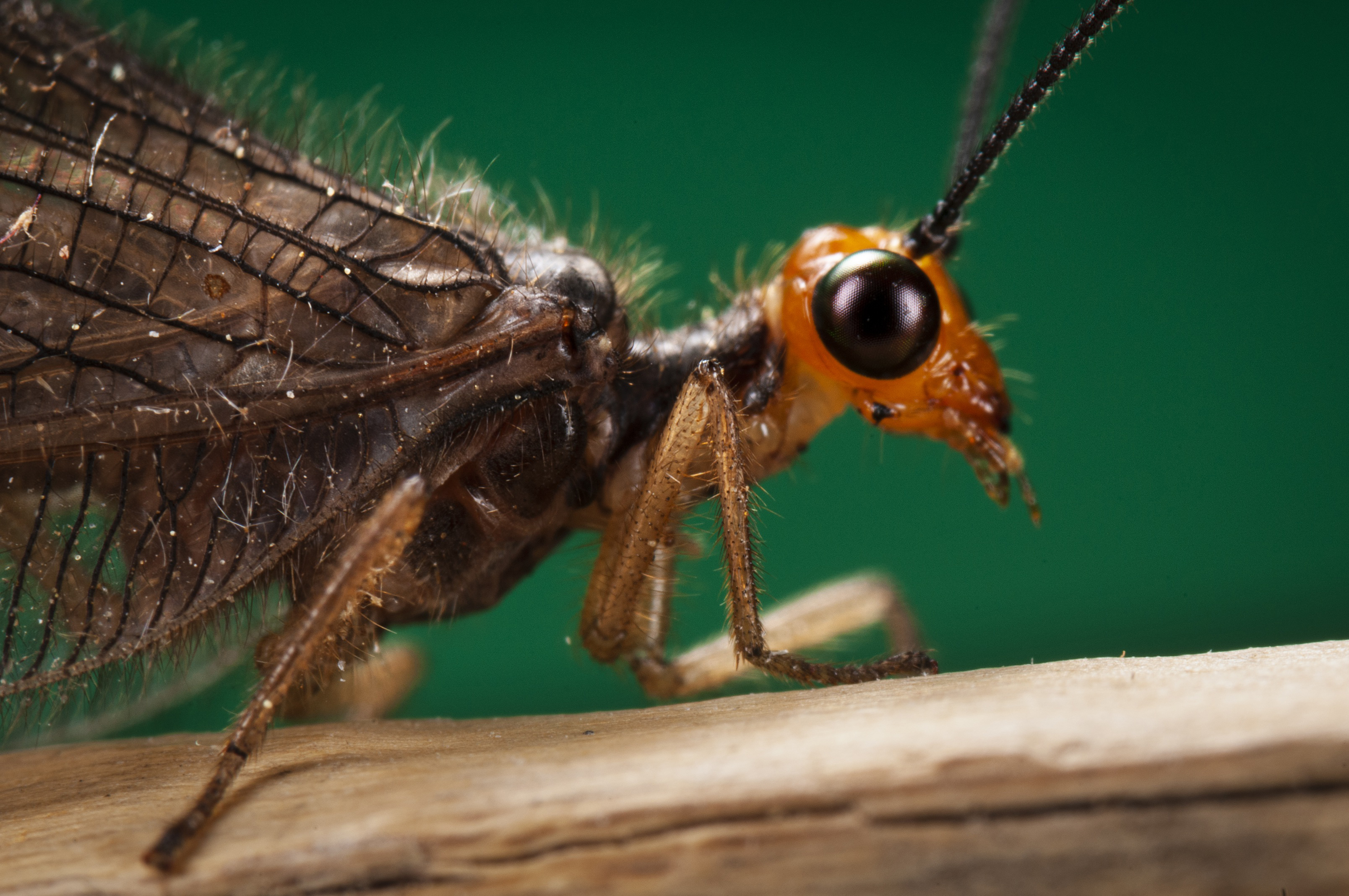
- Osmylus hyalinatus, Adult, South Korea

Scientific classification
- Kingdom: Animalia
- Phylum: Arthropoda
- Clade: Pancrustacea
- Class: Insecta
- Order: Neuroptera
- Family: Osmylidae
- Subfamily: Osmylinae
- Genus: Osmylus; Latreille, 1802

Synonyms
- Dictyosmylus Navás, 1910; Plethosmylus Krüger, 1913

= Osmylus =

Genus of lacewings

Osmylus is a genus of large lacewings, typical of the family Osmylidae, first described by Pierre André Latreille in 1802. Species are recorded mostly from Europe and Asia.

== Species ==
The following are included in BioLib.cz:

subgenus Osmylus Latreille, 1802

1. Osmylus decoratus Nakahara, 1914
2. Osmylus fulvicephalus (Scopoli, 1763)
3. Osmylus hyalinatus McLachlan, 1875
4. Osmylus pryeri McLachlan, 1875
5. Osmylus zheanus Yang & Liu, 2001

subgenus Plesiosmylus Makarin, 1985

1. Osmylus tessellatus McLachlan, 1875

not placed in a subgenus

1. Osmylus angustimarginatus Xu, Wang & Liu, 2016
2. Osmylus atomatus Yang et al., 1988
3. Osmylus biangulus Wang & Liu, 2010
4. Osmylus bipapillatus Wang & Liu, 2010
5. Osmylus cilicicus Krüger, 1913
6. Osmylus conanus Yang, 1987
7. Osmylus elegantissimus Kozhantshikov, 1951
8. Osmylus fuberosus Yang, 1997
9. Osmylus gussakovskii Kozhanchikov, 1951
10. Osmylus hauginus Navás, 1910
11. Osmylus kisoensis Iwata, 1928 inc.sed.
12. Osmylus lucalatus Wang & Liu, 2010
13. Osmylus maoershanicola Xu, Wang & Liu, 2016
14. Osmylus megistus Yang, 1987
15. Osmylus minisculus Yang, 1987
16. Osmylus multiguttatus McLachlan, 1870
17. Osmylus pachycaudatus Wang & Liu, 2010
18. Osmylus posticatus Banks, 1947
19. Osmylus shaanxiensis Xu, Wang & Liu, 2016
20. Osmylus taiwanensis New, 1991
21. Osmylus wuyishanus Yang, 1999
22. Osmylus xizangensis Yang et al., 1988
