= Coniopteryx =

Scientific classification
- Kingdom: Animalia
- Phylum: Arthropoda
- Class: Insecta
- Order: Neuroptera
- Family: Coniopterygidae
- Genus: Coniopteryx; Curtis, 1834

Genus of insects

Coniopteryx is a genus of insects belonging to the family Coniopterygidae.

The genus was first described by Curtis in 1834.

The genus has cosmopolitan distribution.

Species:

- Coniopteryx alticola
- Coniopteryx borealis
- Coniopteryx letardii
- Coniopteryx loipetsederi
- Coniopteryx pygmaea

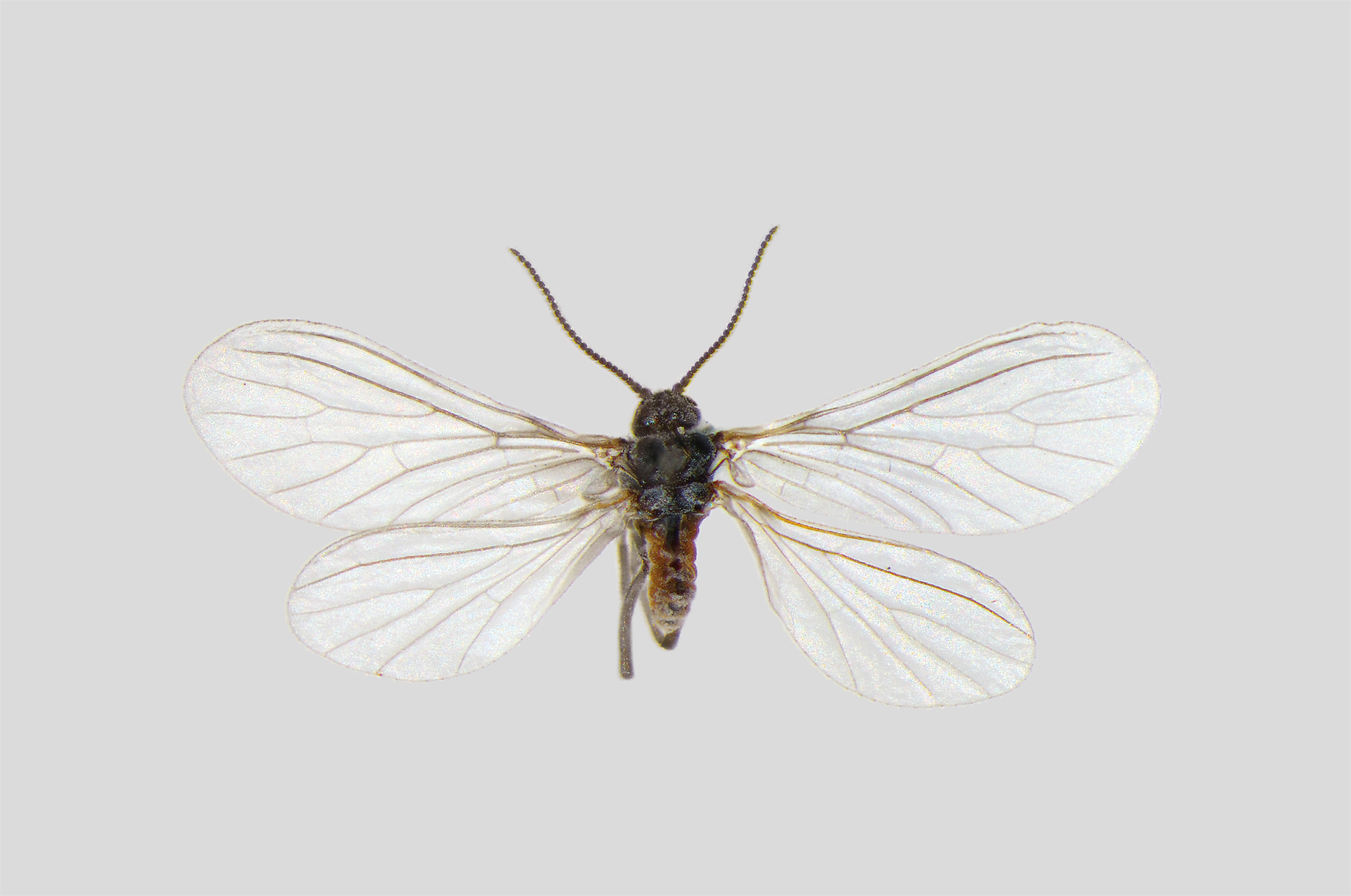
Coniopteryx pygmaea

- Coniopteryx tineiformis

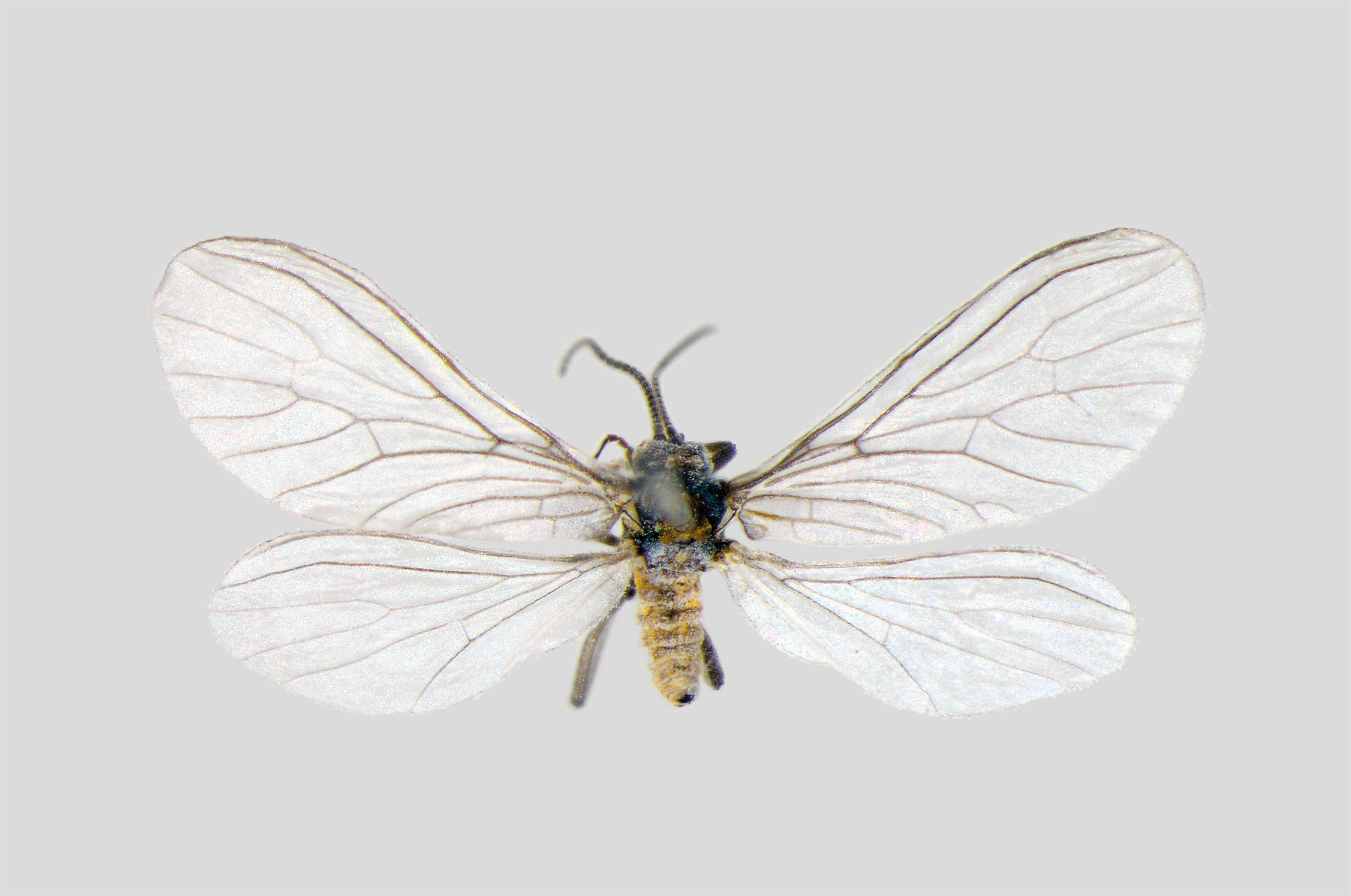
Coniopteryx tineiformis

- Coniopteryx tucumana
