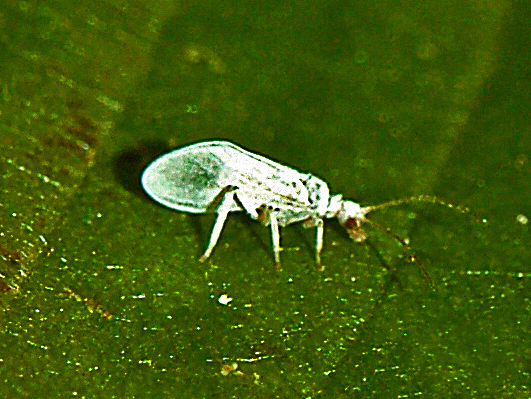
- Conwentzia cf. psociformis
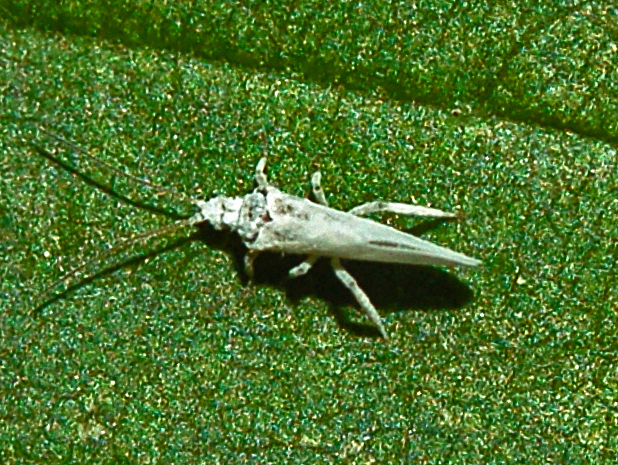
- Conwentzia cf. psociformis, dorsal view

Scientific classification
- Kingdom: Animalia
- Phylum: Arthropoda
- Clade: Pancrustacea
- Class: Insecta
- Order: Neuroptera
- Family: Coniopterygidae
- Subfamily: Aleuropteryginae
- Genus: Conwentzia; Enderlein 1905

= Conwentzia =

Genus of insects

Conwentzia is a genus of net-winged insects belonging to the family Coniopterygidae or dustywings. Conwentzia species are present in most of Europe.

These tiny insects are also known as waxwing lacewings or dustywing lacewings. They have only vestigial hindwings. Body and forewings are covered with whitish dust of waxy scales which the insect produces. Forewings are carried nearly side-by-side when at rest, like many other Neuroptera.

To distinguish various species, an accurate study of the genitals by microscope is usually necessary.

== Species ==
- Conwentzia africana
- Conwentzia barretti
- Conwentzia californica
- Conwentzia capensis
- Conwentzia fraternalis
- Conwentzia inverta
- Conwentzia nietoi
- Conwentzia obscura
- Conwentzia orthotibia
- Conwentzia pineticola
- Conwentzia psociformis
- Conwentzia sabae
- Conwentzia sinica
- Conwentzia yunguiana
