= Isostenosmylus =

Scientific classification
- Domain: Eukaryota
- Kingdom: Animalia
- Phylum: Arthropoda
- Class: Insecta
- Order: Neuroptera
- Family: Osmylidae
- Subfamily: Stenosmylinae
- Genus: Isostenosmylus; Krüger, 1913

Species
- See text

Genus of lacewings

Isostenosmylus is a genus of neotropical osmylid in the subfamily Stenosmylinae. It has been called "the most species-rich genus of lance lacewings in the Neotropical region."

== Species ==
Species accepted within Isostenosmylus include:

- Isostenosmylus angustipennis Martins et al., 2019
- Isostenosmylus angustipennis Martins et al., 2019
- Isostenosmylus barbatus Martins et al., 2019
- Isostenosmylus bifurcatus Ardila-Camacho et al., 2016
- Isostenosmylus contrerasi Ardila-Camacho and Noriega, 2014
- Isostenosmylus fasciatus Kimmins, 1940
- Isostenosmylus fusciceps Kimmins, 1940
- Isostenosmylus inca Martins et al., 2019
- Isostenosmylus irroratus Ardila-Camacho et al., 2016
- Isostenosmylus jaguar Martins et al., 2019
- Isostenosmylus julianae Ardila-Camacho et al., 2016
- Isostenosmylus morenoi (Navás, 1928)
- Isostenosmylus nigrifrons Kimmins, 1940
- Isostenosmylus penai Martins et al., 2019
- Isostenosmylus pulverulentus (Gerstaecker, 1893)
- Isostenosmylus septemtrionalandinus Ardila-Camacho and Noriega, 2014
- Isostenosmylus triangulatus Martins et al., 2019
