= Semidalis =

Scientific classification
- Kingdom: Animalia
- Phylum: Arthropoda
- Clade: Pancrustacea
- Class: Insecta
- Order: Neuroptera
- Family: Coniopterygidae
- Subfamily: Aleuropteryginae
- Genus: Semidalis; Enderlein, 1905

Genus of insects

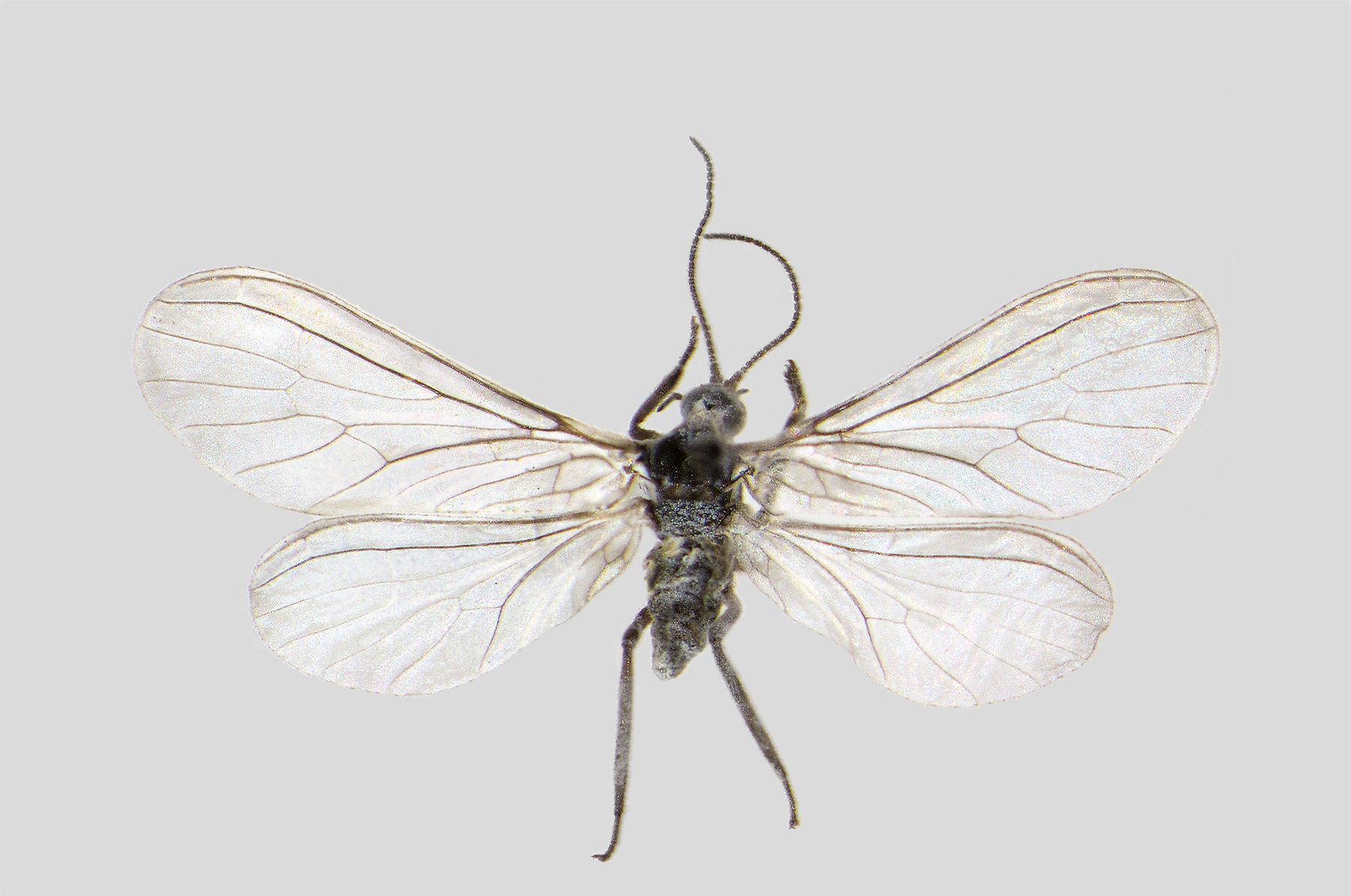
Semidalis aleyrodiformis

Semidalis is a genus of insects belonging to the family Coniopterygidae.

The genus has almost cosmopolitan distribution.

Species:

- Semidalis absurdiceps (Enderlein, 1908)
- Semidalis africana Enderlein, 1906
