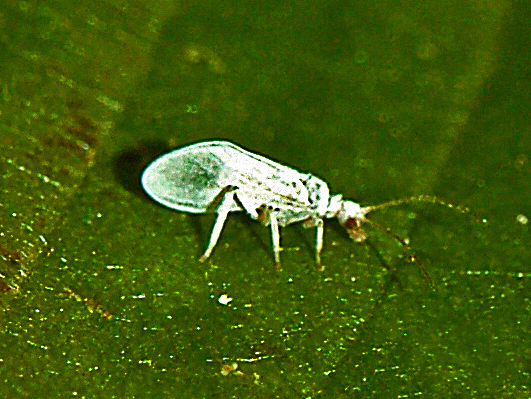
- Conwentzia cf. psociformis

Scientific classification
- Kingdom: Animalia
- Phylum: Arthropoda
- Clade: Pancrustacea
- Class: Insecta
- Order: Neuroptera
- Family: Coniopterygidae
- Subfamily: Aleuropteryginae; Enderlein, 1905

= Aleuropteryginae =

Subfamily of lacewings

Aleuropteryginae is a subfamily of dustywing.

== Genera ==
- Achlyoconis Engel, 2016 †
- Alboconis Nel et al., 2005 †
- Aleuropteryx Löw, 1855
- Archiconiocompsa Enderlein, 1910 †
- Coniocompsa Enderlein, 1905
- Conwentzia Enderlein, 1905
- Cryptoscenea Enderlein, 1914
- Geroconiocompsa Engel, 2010 †
- Helicoconis Enderlein, 1905
- Hemisemidalis Meinander, 1972
- Heteroconis Enderlein, 1905
- Libanoconis Engel, 2002 †
- Neoconis Enderlein, 1930
- Semidalis Enderlein, 1905
- Spiloconis Enderlein, 1907
- Vartiana H. Aspock & U. Aspock, 1965
