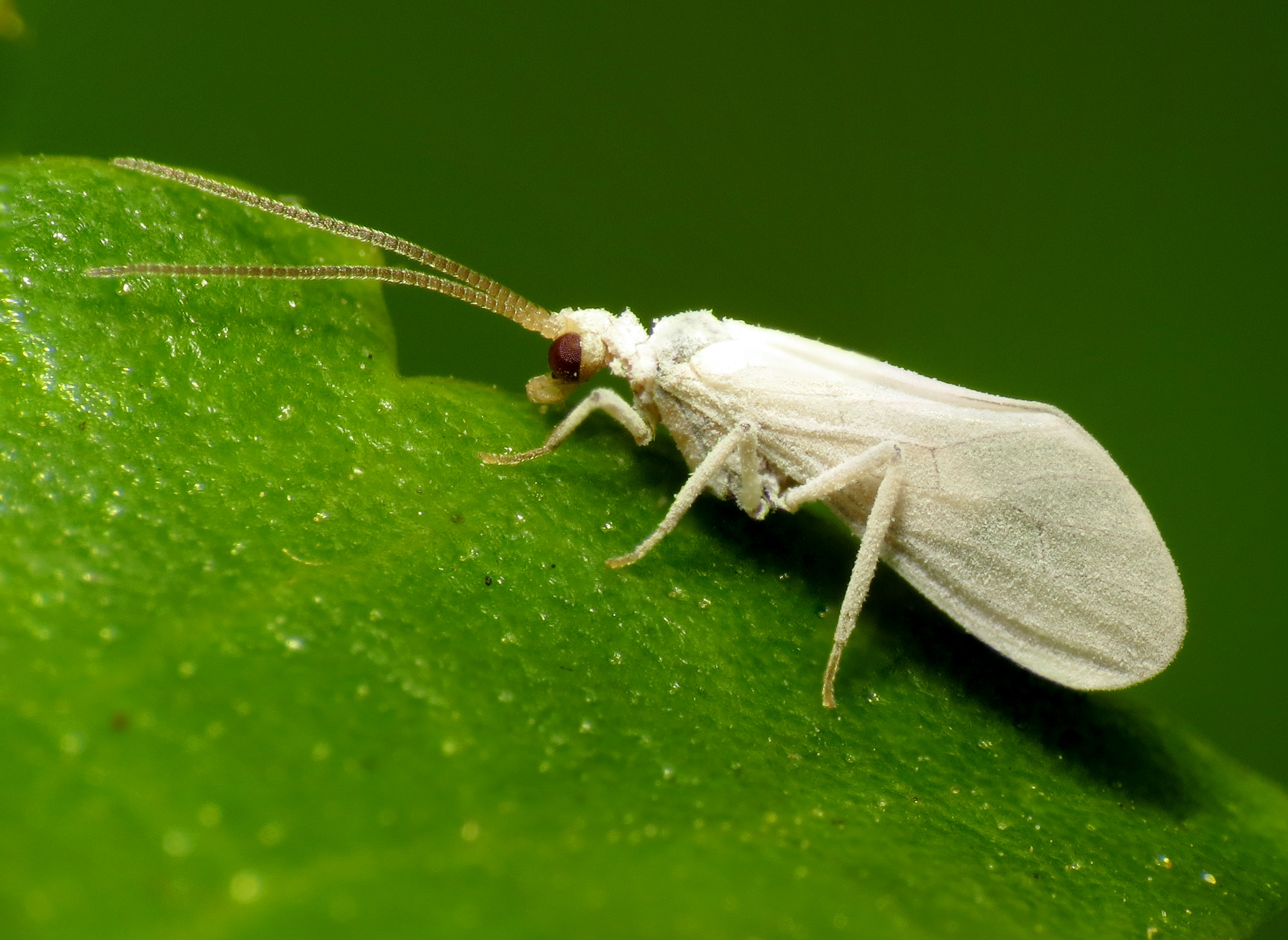

Scientific classification
- Kingdom: Animalia
- Phylum: Arthropoda
- Clade: Pancrustacea
- Class: Insecta
- Order: Neuroptera
- Superfamily: Coniopterygoidea
- Family: Coniopterygidae; Burmeister, 1839

Subfamilies
- Aleuropteryginae; Brucheiserinae; Coniopteryginae and see text

= Coniopterygidae =

Dustywings Temporal range: Toarcian–Recent

Family of insects

The dustywings, Coniopterygidae, are a family of Pterygota (winged insects) of the net-winged insect order (Neuroptera). About 460 living species are known. These tiny insects can usually be determined to genus with a hand lens according to their wing venation, but to distinguish species, examination of the genitals by microscope is usually necessary.

== Description and ecology ==
In general habitus, the adults are quite unlike other net-winged insects. Because of their small size - wingspan is between 1.8 and 5 millimetres - and their translucent brownish wings usually covered with the namesake whitish dust of waxy scales, they may at first be mistaken for whiteflies (Aleyrodidae). But whiteflies are true bugs (Sternorrhyncha), which are only distantly related to net-winged insects. An easily perceived distinguishing feature to separate whiteflies from dustywings is, that like many other Neuroptera, dustywings carry their wings nearly side-by-side when at rest, whereas whiteflies carry them almost flat across the back. There are no more than two veins across the costal field, and few cross-veins in general - unique among the living net-winged insects, dustywings do not actually have the "net-winged" venation. Some Coniopterygidae, like the genus Conwentzia, have only vestigial hindwings; others, like Helicoconis females, are completely wingless.

Dustywings are strongly associated with woody plants, on and around which they usually spend their entire lives. Females deposit their eggs singly on bark or leaves. Dustywing larvae are around 3.5 mm long. Their mouthparts consist of short, straight sucking tubes covered by the labrum (upper "lip"). They are crepuscular and dwell on shrubs and trees, where they feed on small invertebrates like scale insects, aphids and mites, as well as on arthropod eggs; the mouth tubes are used for sucking fluids from the prey. There are usually two generations each year.

== Systematics and taxonomy ==
Due to the dustywings' many apomorphies, the superfamily Coniopterygoidea was formerly believed to be monotypic, and the primitive traits of their larvae were held to evidence a quite basal place among the net-winged insects. But in fact the spongillaflies (Sisyridae), formerly allied with the Osmylidae in error due to their larvae's convergent morphology, seem to be close relatives of the Coniopterygidae, more plesiomorphic altogether as adults but with a number of peculiar and highly divergent apomorphies, particularly in the larvae. So even though the spongillaflies are not generally placed in the Coniopterygoidea yet, they most likely form a clade with the dustywings and thus it would seem that the Coniopterygoidea, rather than being maintained as an unnecessarily monotypic taxon, are better expanded to signify that the spongillaflies and the dustywings are each other's closest relatives among the net-winged insects. This is all the more significant because in this apparent clade, there would be a highly interesting and exactly opposing pattern of evolution - primitive larvae and highly advanced adults in the dustywings, versus primitive adults and very advanced larvae in the spongillaflies.

== Genera ==
=== Living genera ===
- Aleuropteryx Löw, 1855
- Brucheiser Riek, 1975
- Coniocompsa Enderlein, 1905
- Coniopteryx Curtis, 1834
- Conwentzia Enderlein, 1905
- Cryptoscenea Enderlein, 1914
- Flintoconis Sziráki, 2007
- Helicoconis Enderlein, 1905
- Hemisemidalis Meinander, 1972
- Heteroconis Enderlein, 1905
- Neoconis Enderlein, 1930
- Neosemidalis Enderlein, 1930
- Nimboa Navas, 1915
- Parasemidalis Enderlein, 1905
- Semidalis Enderlein, 1905
- Spiloconis Enderlein, 1907
- Vartiana H. Aspock & U. Aspock, 1965

=== Extinct genera ===
The earliest coniopterygid is Toarciconiopteryx from the Early Jurassic (Toarcian) Green Series of Germany, dating to around 182 million years ago, with numerous other fossil species known, predominantly in amber. The supposed Early Jurassic dustywing genus Archiconiopteryx actually seems to be a whitefly-like true bug.

Subfamily Aleuropteryginae

- †Burmaleuropteryx Bai et al. 2019 Burmese amber, Myanmar, Late Cretaceous (Cenomanian)
- †Garnaconis Perrichot and Nel 2014 Vendée amber, France, Late Cretaceous (Turonian)
- †Juraconiopteryx Meinander 1975 Karabastau Formation, Kazakhstan, Middle-Late Jurassic (Callovian/Oxfordian)
- †Libanoconis Engel 2002 Lebanese amber, Early Cretaceous (Barremian), Taimyr amber, Cenomanian
- †Palaeoconis Ružičková et al. 2019 Burmese amber, Myanmar, Cenomanian
- Tribe Coniocompsini Enderlein 1905
  - †Archiconiocompsa Enderlein 1910 Baltic amber, Rovno amber, Eocene
  - †Geroconiocompsa Engel 2010 Balic amber, Eocene
- Tribe Fontenelleini
  - †Achlyoconis Engel 2016 Burmese amber, Myanmar, Cenomanian
  - †Alboconis Nel et al. 2005 Charentese amber, France, Cenomanian
  - †Archiconis Enderlein 1930 Baltic amber, Eocene
  - †Cycloconis Li et al. 2019 Burmese amber, Myanmar, Cenomanian
  - †Glaesoconis Meinander 1975 Burmese amber, Myanmar, Cenomanian, New Jersey amber, Turonian Taimyr amber, Late Cretaceous (Santonian)
  - †Pararchiconis Nel 1991 Alsace, France, Oligocene (Rupelian)
  - †Soplaoconis Pérez-de la Fuente et al. 2019 Spanish amber, Early Cretaceous (Albian)

Subfamily Coniopteryginae Burmeister 1839

- Tribe Coniopterygini Burmeister 1839
  - †Paranimboa Engel 2016 Burmese amber, Myanmar, Cenomanian
- †tribe Phthanoconini Engel 2004
  - †Phthanoconis Engel 2004 Burmese amber, Myanmar, Cenomanian
- †Libanosemidalis Azar et al. 2000 Lebanese amber, Barremian
- †Mulleroconis Ružičková et al. 2019 Burmese amber, Myanmar, Cenomanian

Incertae sedis

- †Apoglaesoconis Grimaldi 2000 New Jersey amber, Turonian
- †Cretaconiopteryx Liu and Lu 2017 Burmese amber, Myanmar, Cenomanian
- †Jurasiatypus Kaddumi 2005 Jordanian amber, Albian
