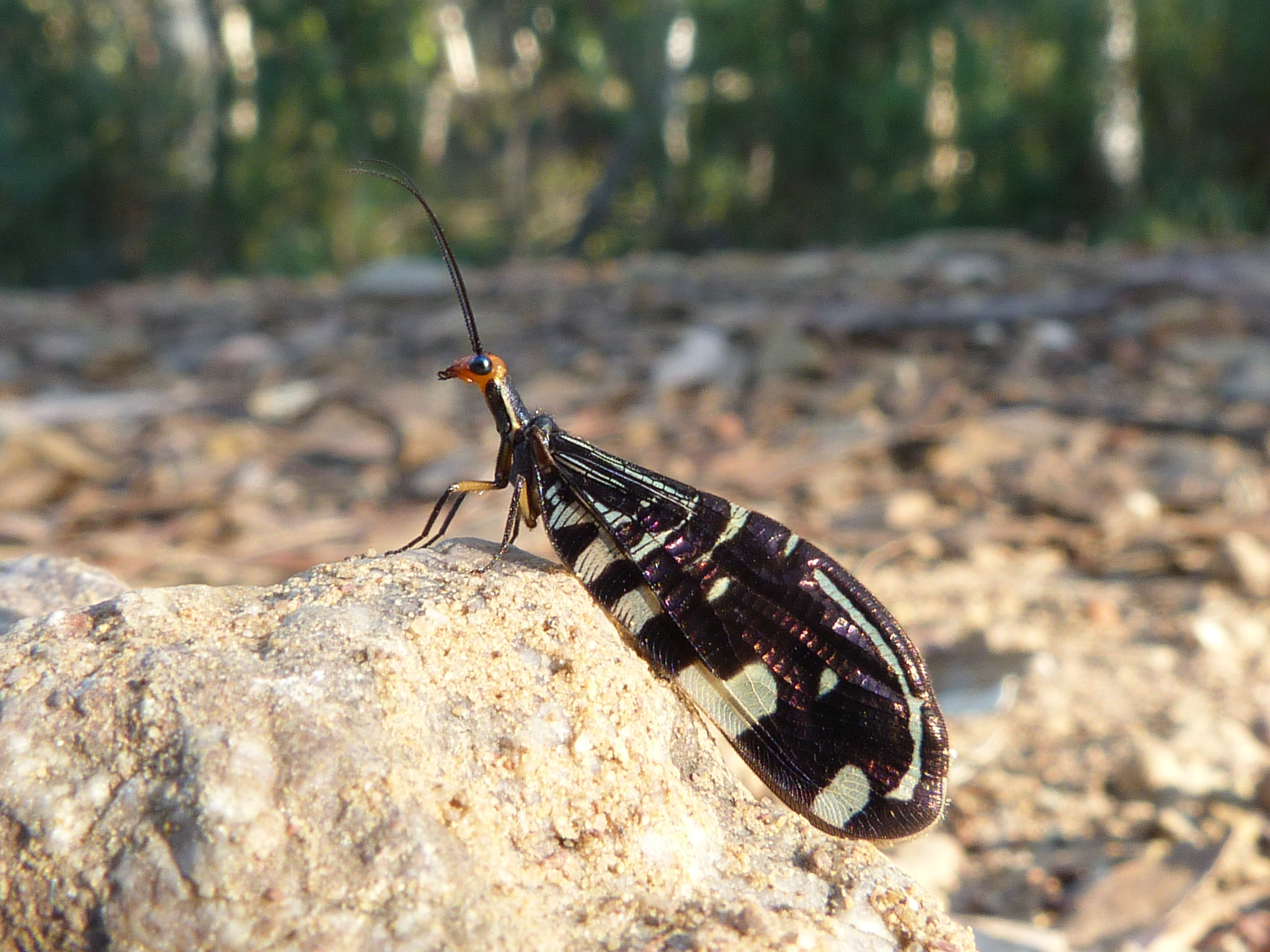
- Porismus strigatus, Black Mountain, Canberra (Australia)

Scientific classification
- Kingdom: Animalia
- Phylum: Arthropoda
- Clade: Pancrustacea
- Class: Insecta
- Order: Neuroptera
- Superfamily: Osmyloidea
- Family: Osmylidae; Linnaeus, 1758

Subfamilies
- See text

= Osmylidae =

Osmylidae Temporal range: Early Jurassic–Recent

Family of insects

Osmylidae are a small family of winged insects of the net-winged insect order Neuroptera. The osmylids, also called lance lacewings, stream lacewings or giant lacewings (Note: Not to be confused with Ithonidae), are found all over the world except North and Central America. There are around 225 extant species.

== Description and ecology ==
Adult osmylids are small to moderately-sized net-winged insects, with wingspans ranging from 1.4 to 3 cm. Smaller members resemble typical green lacewings, and larger species resemble antlions. Many species, namely those of the type genus Osmylus, have spotted wings. The thin antennae are short. They have two compound eyes, as well as three ocelli in between. Adult osmylids, like green lacewings (some of which are colloquially known as "stinkflies"), have prothoracal glands which produce foul-smelling compounds used to deter would-be predators.

Their larvae are superficially similar to those of spongillaflies (Sisyridae). They have peculiar mouthparts which look like a thin forceps with the ends bending outwards. The body is elongated and slender and terminates in two extensible graspers bearing tiny hooks; these are used to aid in locomotion and to grasp prey. The larvae are associated with damp, mossy habitats and are amphibious. They hunt small invertebrate prey, from which they suck the body fluids with their mouthparts.

The adults are diurnal or crepuscular weak-flying insects which mostly prey on small invertebrates, supplemented with some pollen. Eggs are deposited in damp places, usually near freshwater.

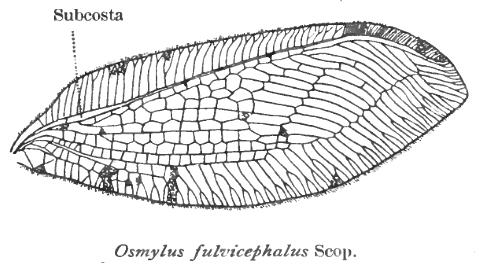
Wing of Osmylus fulvicephalus

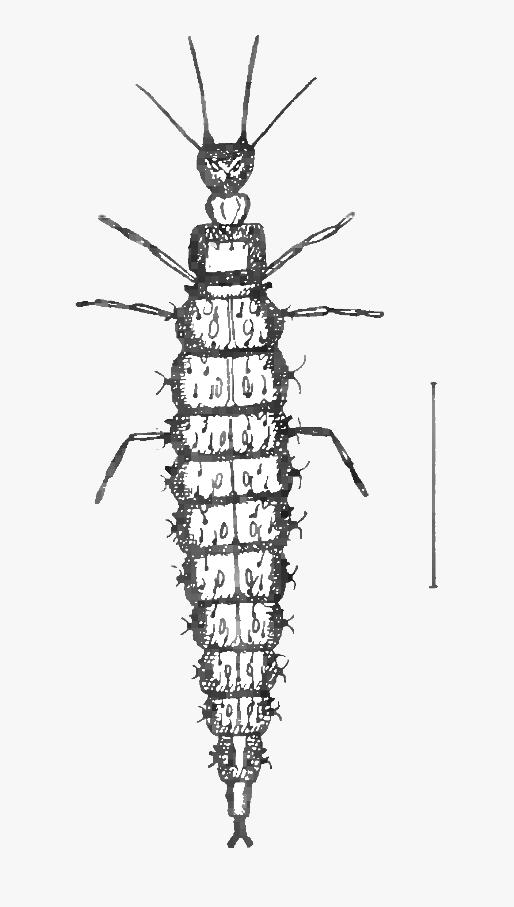
Larva of Osmylus fulvicephalus

== Systematics and taxonomy ==
Osmylids are generally placed with the extant families Sisyridae (spongillaflies) and Nevrorthidae within the clade Osmyloidea, which is the second earliest diverging clade of Neuroptera after Coniopterygidae (dustywings). The group also contains Archeosmylidae from the Permian-Triassic and Saucrosmylidae from the Middle Jurassic, both of which are thought to be closely related to Osmylidae. The earliest records of Osmylidae date to the Early Jurassic, some of which are already assignable to extant subfamilies, and were diverse during the Jurassic and Cretaceous. At least 278 species have been described in 25 extant and 38 extinct genera.

The following subfamilies and genera are largely after Winterton et al., 2019

=== Eidoporisminae ===
Eidoporisminae Esben-Petersen, 1917

- Eidoporismus Esben-Petersen, 1917 - Australia
- †Stenosmylina Jepson et al., 2009 - Weald Clay, United Kingdom, Early Cretaceous (Hauterivian)

=== Gumillinae ===
Gumillinae Navas, 1912

- Gumilla Navas, 1912 - Brazil
- †Allotriosmylus Yang et al., 2010 - Daohugou Bed, China, Middle Jurassic (Callovian)
- †Enodinympha Ren & Engel 2007 - Daohugou Bed, China, Middle Jurassic (Callovian)
- †Epiosmylus Panfilov, 1980 - Daohugou Bed, China, Middle Jurassic (Callovian), Itat Formation, Russia, Middle Jurassic (Bathonian), Karabastau Formation, Kazakhstan, Middle/Late Jurassic
- †Kolbasinella Khramov, 2014 - Karabastau Formation, Kazakhstan, Middle/Late Jurassic
- †Nilionympha Ren & Engel, 2007 - Daohugou Bed, China, Middle Jurassic (Callovian)
- †Nuddsia Menon & Makarkin, 2008 - Crato Formation, Brazil, Early Cretaceous (Aptian) (=Burmaleon Myskowiak et al., 2016 Burmese amber, Myanmar, Late Cretaceous (Cenomanian))
- †Osmylochrysa Jepson et al., 2012 - Purbeck Group, England, Early Cretaceous (Berriasian)
- †Tenuosmylus Wang et al., 2009 Daohugou Bed, China, Middle Jurassic (Callovian)

=== Kempyninae ===
Kempyninae Carpenter, 1943

- Australysmus Kimmins, 1940 - Australia
- Euosmylus Krüger, 1913 - New Zealand
- Kempynus Navás, 1912 Australia, New Zealand, Argentina, Chile
- †Arbusella Khramov, 2014 - Karabastau Formation, Kazakhstan, Middle/Late Jurassic
- †Cretosmylus Makarkin, 1990 - Zaza Formation, Russia, Early Cretaceous (Aptian)
- †Euporismites Tillyard, 1916 Redbank Plains Formation, Australia, Eocene (Ypresian)
- †Jurakempynus Wang et al., 2011 Daohugou Bed, China, Middle Jurassic (Callovian), Karabastau Formation, Kazakhstan, Middle/Late Jurassic, Shar-Teeg, Mongolia, Late Jurassic (Tithonian)
- †Kempynosmylus Makarkin, 2014 Zaza Formation, Russia, Early Cretaceous (Aptian)
- †Ponomarenkius Khramov et al., 2017 - Daohugou Bed, China, Middle Jurassic (Callovian)
- †Sauktangida Khramov, 2014 - Kyrgyzstan, Early Jurassic (Toarcian)
- †Mirokempynus Ma et al. 2020 Daohugou Bed, China, Middle Jurassic (Callovian)

=== †Mesosmylininae ===
Mesosmylininae Bode, 1953

- †Mesosmylina Bode, 1953 Jurassic, Europe & Asia
- †Sogjuta Martynova, 1958 Jurassic, Asia

=== Osmylinae ===
Osmylinae Leach, 1815

- Grandosmylus Makarkin, 1985 - Afghanistan, Tajikistan
- Lahulus Navás, 1930 - India
- Osmylus Latreille 1802 - Eurasia
- Parosmylus Needham, 1909 - Central through South Asia
- Sinosmylus Yang, 1992 - China
- †Lithosmylus Carpenter, 1943 - Florissant Formation, Colorado, United States, Eocene (Priabonian)
- †Vetosmylus Ma et al., 2020 - Daohugou Bed, China, Middle Jurassic (Callovian)

=== Porisminae ===
Porisminae Krüger, 1913

- Porismus McLachlan, 1867 - Australia

=== Protosmylinae ===
Protosmylinae Krüger, 1913

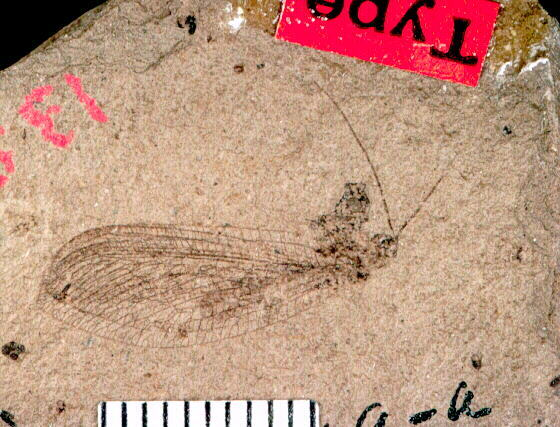
Osmylidia requieta syntype Florissant Formation USA

- Gryposmylus Krüger, 1913 - Central to Southeast Asia
- Heterosmylus Krüger, 1913 Central to South Asia
- Lysmus Navás, 1910 - Indonesia, China, Japan, Russia
- Paryphosmylus Krüger, 1913 - Ecuador
- †Juraheterosmylus Wang et al., 2010 - Daohugou Bed, China, Middle Jurassic (Callovian)
- †Jurosmylus Makarkin & Archibald 2005 - Karabastau Formation, Kazakhstan, Middle/Late Jurassic
- †Mesosmylidus Jepson et al., 2012 - Purbeck Group, England, Early Cretaceous (Berriasian)
- †Myanmarosmylus Li et al. 2024 Burmese amber, Myanmar, Late Cretaceous (Cenomanian)
- †Osmylidia Cockerell, 1908 - Florissant Formation, Colorado, United States, Eocene (Priabonian)
- †Petrushevskia Martynova, 1958 - Dzhil Formation, Kyrgyzstan, Early Jurassic (Hettangian)
- †Protosmylina Jepson et al., 2009 - Weald Clay, United Kingdom, Early Cretaceous (Barremian)
- †Protosmylus Krüger, 1913 - Baltic amber, Baltic Coast, Europe, Eocene
- †Pseudosmylidia Makarkin, 2017 Florissant Formation, Colorado, United States, Eocene (Priabonian)

=== Spilosmylinae ===
Spilosmylinae Kruger, 1913

- Spilosmylus Kolbe, 1897 - Africa, South through Southeast Asia, New Guinea
- Thaumatosmylus Krüger, 1913 - Indonesia, Malaysia, China
- Thyridosmylus Krüger, 1913 Madagascar, China, India
- †Ensiosmylus Khramov, 2014 Karabastau Formation, Kazakhstan, Middle/Late Jurassic
- †Imanosmylus Makarkin, 1994 Siyanovskaya Formation, Russia, Late Cretaceous (Maastrichtian)

=== Stenosmylinae ===
Stenosmylinae Krüger, 1913

- Carinosmylus New, 1986 - Australia
- Euporismus Tillyard, 1916 - Australia
- Isostenosmylus Krüger, 1913 - Northern South America
- Oedosmylus Krüger, 1913 - Australia
- Phymatosmylus Adams, 1969 - Argentina, Chile
- Stenolysmus Kimmins, 1940 - Australia
- Stenosmylus McLachlan, 1867 - Australia

=== Incertae sedis ===
- †Archaeosmylidia Makarkin et al., 2014 - Daohugou Bed, China, Middle Jurassic (Callovian)
- †Dimidiosmylus Khramov, 2014 - Shar-Teeg, Mongolia, Late Jurassic (Tithonian)
- †Erlikosmylus Khramov, 2014 - Sagul Formation, Kyrgyzstan, Early Jurassic (Toarcian)
- †Karaosmylus Makarkin, 1990 Karabastau Formation, Kazakhstan, Middle/Late Jurassic
- †Kubekius Khramov, 2017 - Itat Formation, Russia, Middle Jurassic (Bathonian)
- †Osmylopsis Handlirsch, 1906 - Purbeck Group, England, Early Cretaceous (Berriasian)
- †Palaeothyridosmylus Wang et al., 2009 Daohugou Bed, China, Middle Jurassic (Callovian)
- †Pronymphites Panfilov, 1980 - Karabastau Formation, Kazakhstan, Middle/Late Jurassic
- †Scapoptera Panfilov, 1980 - Karabastau Formation, Kazakhstan, Middle/Late Jurassic
- †Stenochrysa Jepson et al., 2012 - Purbeck Group, England, Early Cretaceous (Berriasian)
- †Tengriosmylus Khramov, 2014 - Sagul Formation, Kyrgyzstan, Early Jurassic (Toarcian)
- †Tetanoptilon Bode, 1953 - Posidonia Shale, Germany, Early Jurassic (Toarcian)
