= Dicromantispa electromexicana =

Dicromantispa electromexicana Temporal range: Burdigalian

Scientific classification
- Kingdom: Animalia
- Phylum: Arthropoda
- Clade: Pancrustacea
- Class: Insecta
- Order: Neuroptera
- Family: Mantispidae
- Genus: Dicromantispa
- Species: D. electromexicana

Binomial name
- Dicromantispa electromexicana Engel & Grimaldi, 2007

Extinct species of insect

Dicromantispa electromexicana is an extinct species of mantidfly in the neuropteran family Mantispidae known from a fossil found in North America.

== History and classification ==
Dicromantispa electromexicana was described from a solitary fossil, which is preserved as an inclusion in a transparent chunk of Mexican amber. At the time of description, the amber specimen was housed in the fossil collection of the American Museum of Natural History in New York City. The holotype fossil is composed of a very complete adult male. Mexican amber is recovered from fossil bearing rocks in the Simojovel region of Chiapas, Mexico. The amber dates from between 22.5 million years old, for the youngest sediments of the Balumtun Sandstone, and 26 million years old La Quinta Formation. This age range straddles the boundary between the Late Oligocene and Early Miocene and is complicated by both formations being secondary deposits for the amber, the age range is only the youngest that it might be.

The male holotype was first studied by entomologists Michael Engel of the University of Kansas and David Grimaldi of the American Museum of Natural History with their 2007 type description of the species was published in the natural sciences journal American Museum Novitates. The specific epithet electromexicana was coined from the Greek word "electron", meaning amber, combined with Mexico as a reference to the nature of the preservation and the country of the type locality. D. electromexicana is one of two fossil Dicromantispa species Engel and Grimaldi described in 2007. The other species, D. moronei, is from the similarly aged Dominican amber of Hispaniola.

== Description ==
The holotype male of D. electromexicana is nearly complete, only missing portions of the wing tips on two wings. Overall the specimen is approximately 10.4 mm (0.41 in) long, with 7.97 mm (0.314 in) forewings and a 3.35 mm (0.132 in) pronotum. Based on the general appearance of the pronotum, D. electromexicana is visually similar to the extant North American Zeugomantispa minuta. However, the long and relatively unadorned pronotum of D. electromexicana in combination with the structural features of the plates surrounding the anus, show the two species to not be related. Between D. electromexicana and D. moronei the shorter, wider, pronotum of D. moronei along with the smaller size and longer profemoral spine of D. electromexicana separate the two species. The anal plates of D. electromexicana lack a ventromedian lobe, a feature found in all living members of Dicromantispa. Due to the lack of other anal structure details the species was placed into Dicromantispa rather than into a new genus.
