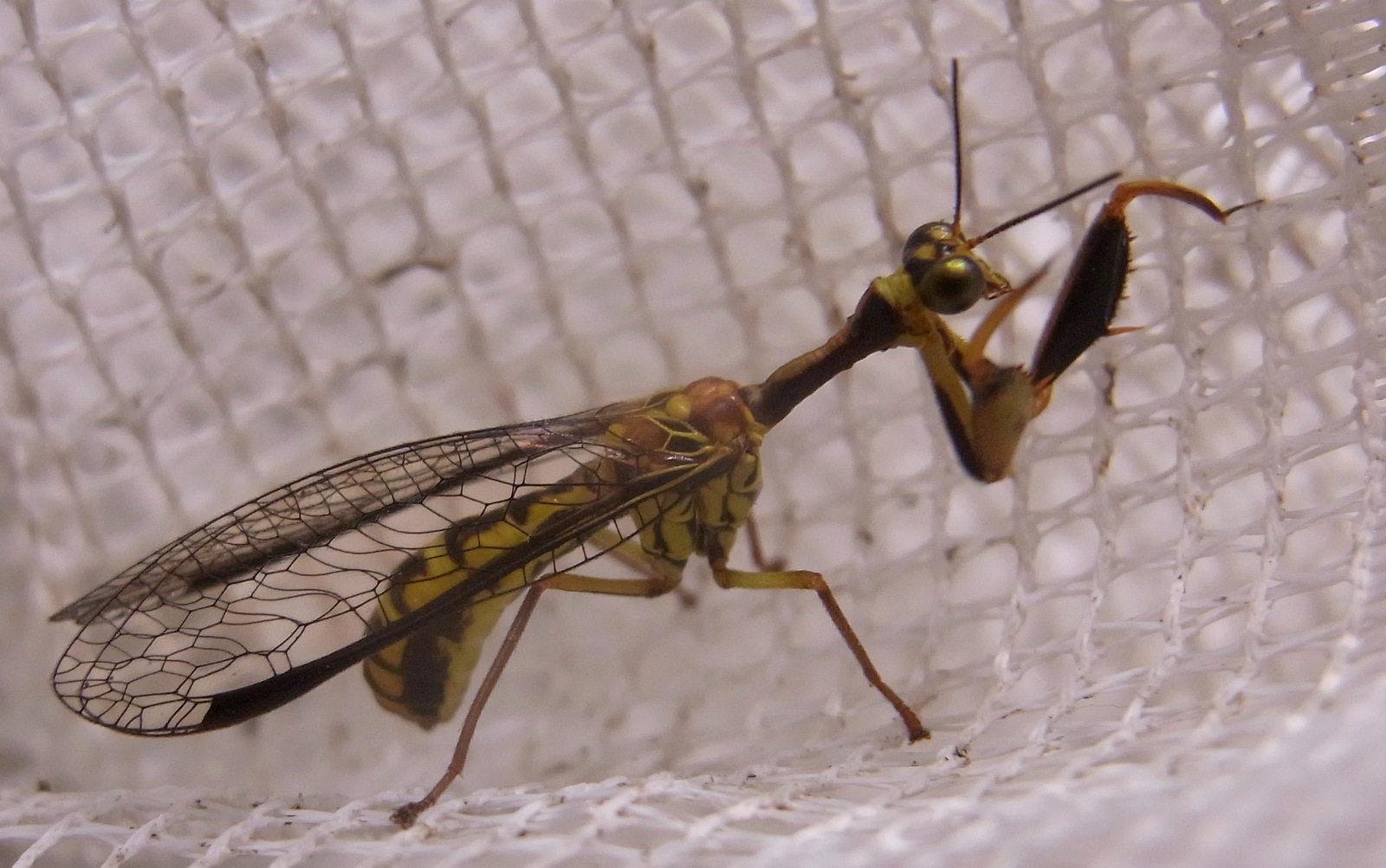

Scientific classification
- Domain: Eukaryota
- Kingdom: Animalia
- Phylum: Arthropoda
- Class: Insecta
- Order: Neuroptera
- Family: Mantispidae
- Genus: Spaminta
- Species: S. minjerribae

Binomial name
- Spaminta minjerribae Lambkin, 1986

= Spaminta minjerribae =

Species of insect

Spaminta minjerribae is a species of mantidfly in the family Mantispidae. Known to occur in eastern Australia.
