= Bulletin of the American Museum of Natural History =

- Discipline: Natural history
- Language: English

Publication details
- History: 1881–present
- Publisher: American Museum of Natural History (USA)
- Frequency: irregular
- Impact factor: 4.548 (2021)

Standard abbreviations
- ISO 4: Bull. Am. Mus. Nat. Hist.

Indexing
- CODEN: BUMNAE
- ISSN: 0003-0090
- LCCN: 12030245
- OCLC no.: 1287364

Links
- Journal homepage

The Bulletin of the American Museum of Natural History is a peer-reviewed scientific journal in the fields of zoology, paleontology, and geology. It is part of a group of journals published by the American Museum of Natural History, in which context it is commonly referred to as the Bulletin to distinguish it from other series of journals published by the museum.

The Bulletin was founded in 1881, originally for publishing short papers. One of its first editors was the American zoologist and ornithologist Joel Asaph Allen. Scientists and naturalists who published in the journal in its early years included Sir John William Dawson, Lucius Eugene Chittenden, Jules Marcou, Ezra Brainerd, Edgar Alexander Mearns, Maximilian von Wied.

Since 1881, the American Museum of Natural History Bulletin has been published every month. It includes recent findings from the natural sciences in the fields of geology, paleontology, and zoology.

In the 1920s, the role of publishing short papers was taken over by the Novitates series, and the Bulletin began publishing longer papers that had previously been the remit of the Memoirs series. Beginning with volume 23 (1907), information on anthropological matters was published in Anthropological Papers. The Bulletin is currently (as of 2009) published at irregular intervals.

== See also ==
- American Museum Novitates
