= Dicromantispa sayi =

Scientific classification
- Kingdom: Animalia
- Phylum: Arthropoda
- Clade: Pancrustacea
- Class: Insecta
- Order: Neuroptera
- Family: Mantispidae
- Genus: Dicromantispa
- Species: D. sayi

Binomial name
- Dicromantispa sayi (Banks, 1897)

Synonyms
- Mantispa sayi, Mantispa fuscicornis, Mantispa uhleri, Dicromantispa fuscicornis

Species of insect

Dicromantispa sayi, or Say's mantidfly is a species of mantidfly in the family Mantispidae. It is found in the Caribbean Sea, Central America, and North America.

== Identification ==
Head: Brown to black with pale yellow marks. Face has a longitudinal yellow stripe each side of center; middle dark area appearing as a dark stripe, sometimes incomplete. Pattern of yellow oblong spots on top of head; can be obscure. Eyes multi-colored.

Antenna: Brown except segment 1 yellowish, more so on underside.

Thorax: Neck (prothorax) long and slender, more cone-shaped at head. Cream-colored patch at base and end of neck; rest yellowish-brown to dark brown. Usually with a light or dark colored longitudinal stripe down center. Thorax side on female dark with cream, curved lines. Male sides mostly pale.

Wings: Wings clear with brown veins; no brown spots at wing tips. Base and outside edge of wings dark brown (costa area), with a faint yellowish streak. Stigma at end of costa also dark brown.

Legs: Front legs modified, similar to praying mantis; dark brown with light streaks. Usually folded up and not used, except for eating. Mid and hind legs pale yellow with brown streaks; females have joint to body (coxae) brown; male coxae pale.

Abdomen: Yellowish-brown to dark brown with yellow marks. Female abdomen always darker, and may be entirely black; the yellow marks vary considerably. Abdomen side edges cream, almost entirely on male, more spotted on female.

Similar Species: Dicromantispa interrupta is a larger species with a dark patch near tip of wing.

Leptomantispa pulchella has side-by-side (paired) yellow stripes of even width running down sides of abdomen, whereas D. sayi has uneven width pattern down sides.

L. pulchella also has a bright, burnt orange stigma on wings, not brown as in D. sayi. Otherwise, these two are identical.

Size: 14 to 15 mm long.

Habitat: Forest edges and prairies where spiders are present.

Food: Adults feed on small flying insects. Larvae hunt for spider eggs, with major hosts including are wolf spiders (Lycosidae), and the running crab spider Philodromus vulgaris.

Flight Time: Jul 15 to Sep 4th. Peaks end of July

Life Cycle: Females lay eggs on any substrate. Larvae hatch, wander, find and either penetrate egg sacs, or hitch a ride on adult female spiders ready to lay eggs. 1st instar over-winters. One generation per year.

== Sources ==
Transactions of the American Entomological Society, 1897, Vol. 24, pg. 23 by Banks.

Transactions of the American Entomological Society, 1911, Vol. 37, pp. 347 to 348 by Banks.

Psyche, 1943, Vol. 50: Neuroptera & Trichoptera of the United States by Banks, pp. 79 to 80.

Illinois Biological Monographs, 1985, Vol. 53: Developmental Ecology of Mantispa uhleri by Redborg and MacLeod.

Proceedings of the Entomological Society of Washington, 1989, Vol. 91 by Hoffman.

Canadian Entomologist, 2006, Vol. 138 #4: Mantispidae of Canada by Cannings and Cannings.

== Types ==
Lectotype Mantispa sayi male by Banks, 1897. Type Locality: Brazos Co. Texas. In the Museum of Comparative Zoology, Harvard, Cambridge, Mass.

Lectotype Mantispa fuscicornis male by Banks, 1911. Type Locality: Kissimmee, Florida. In the Museum of Comparative Zoology, Harvard, Cambridge, Mass.

Holotype Mantispa uhleri female by Banks, 1943. Type Locality: Pennsylvanica. In the Museum of Comparative Zoology, Harvard, Cambridge, Mass.

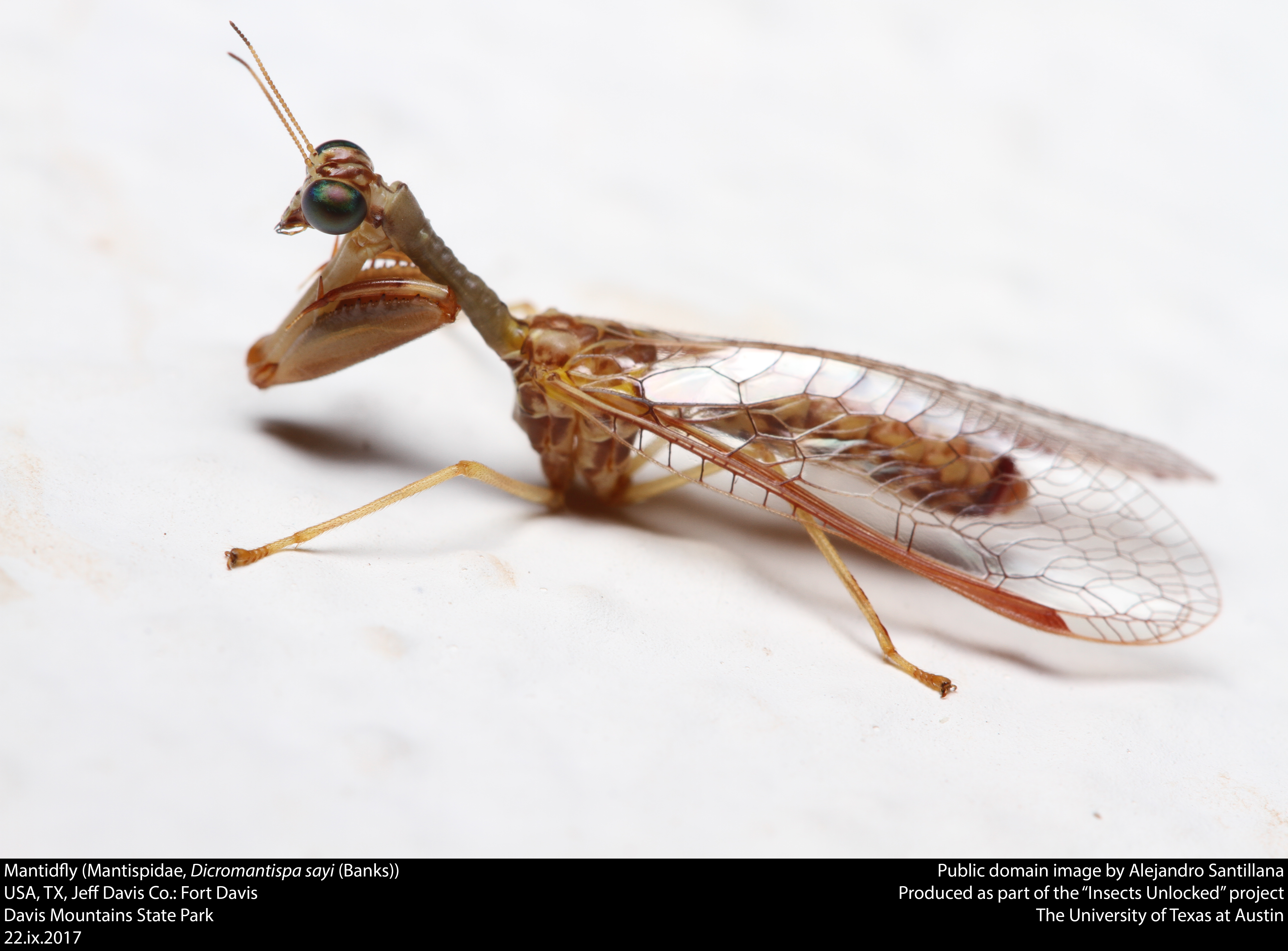
