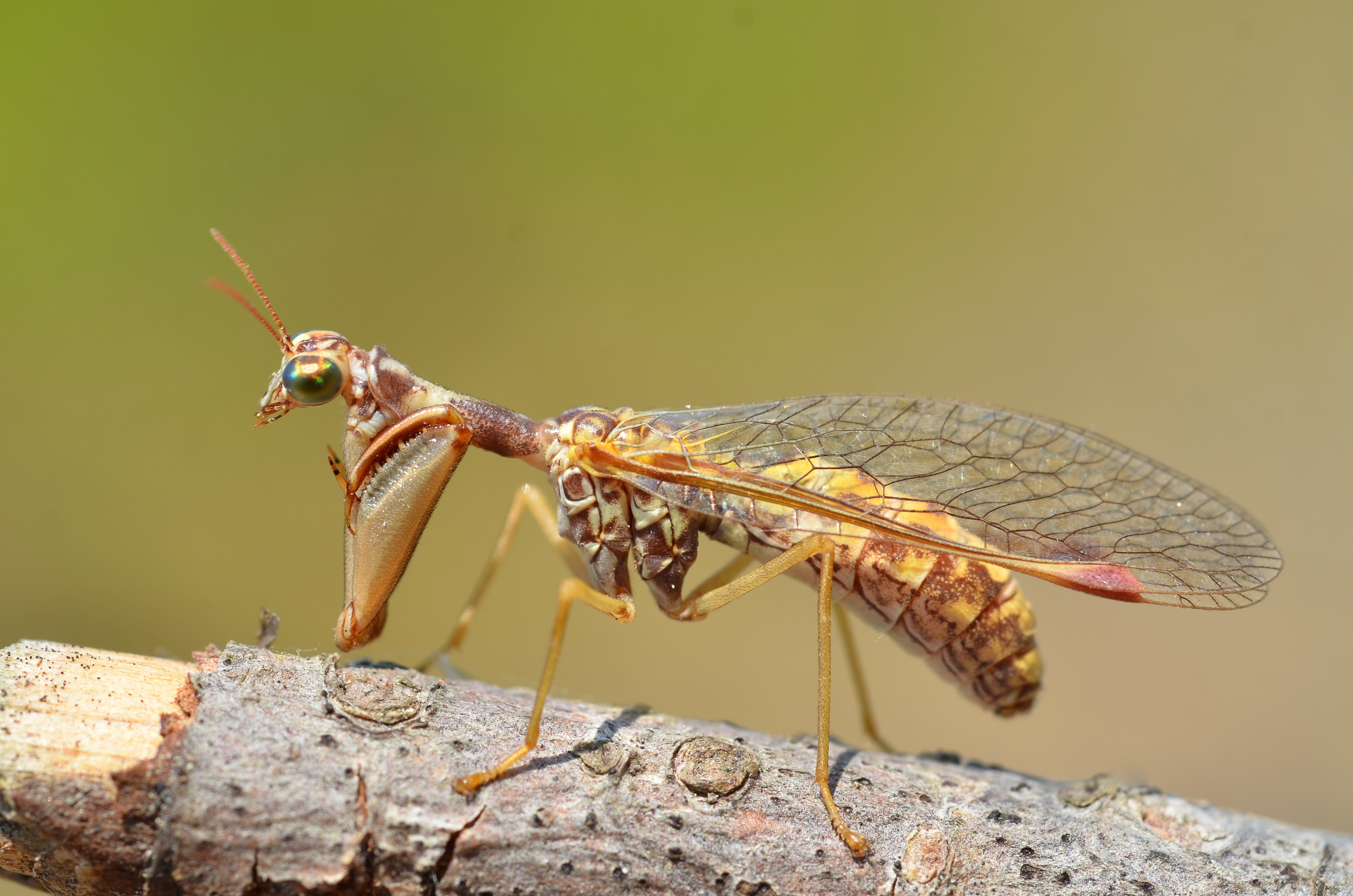

Scientific classification
- Kingdom: Animalia
- Phylum: Arthropoda
- Clade: Pancrustacea
- Class: Insecta
- Order: Neuroptera
- Family: Mantispidae
- Subfamily: Mantispinae
- Genus: Mantispa
- Species: M. styriaca

Binomial name
- Mantispa styriaca Poda, 1761

= Mantispa styriaca =

Species of lacewing

Mantispa styriaca, the Styrian praying lacewing, is a species of predatory mantidfly native to Europe. It is a yellow-brown insect as an adult and has multiple larval stages.

== Description ==
The adult Styrian praying lacewing is a yellow-brown color with transparent wings that have a wingspan of 35 mm (1.4 in). The species can be found in southern and central Europe. Its forelegs are similar to those of the praying mantis, with the ability to seize living prey.

== Biology ==
The larva emerges from reddish eggs after 21 days and then hibernates through the winter. In the spring, the larva searches for a female wolf or fishing spider, of the genera Lycosa and Dolomedes, in order to bore its way into the cocoon that the spider carries on its abdomen, by biting a slit open. It is carnivorous in its first stage, as shown by dead spiders being found around it. Before the larva molts, it resembles a dipluran of genus Campodea. After the larva's first molt, the species has short legs that it cannot use, a small head, has jaws that extend straight out, and has pointed antennae that extend beyond the jaws. Once the larva starts metamorphosis, it pupates by spinning a cocoon inside the spider's egg sac, in which it stays up to 14 days before its final molting. Pupation happens in the middle of June. It is a nymph after emerging from the cocoon, not yet in its adult form. Once it enters the adult stage, the species hunt for prey by using fast strikes of their forelegs that can take less than 60 ms. Its hunting style is similar to that of the praying mantis.

Friedrich Moritz Brauer, an Austrian entomologist, discovered the first instar on vegetation in 1852. It was not until 17 years later that he discovered the other instars within spider egg sacs.
