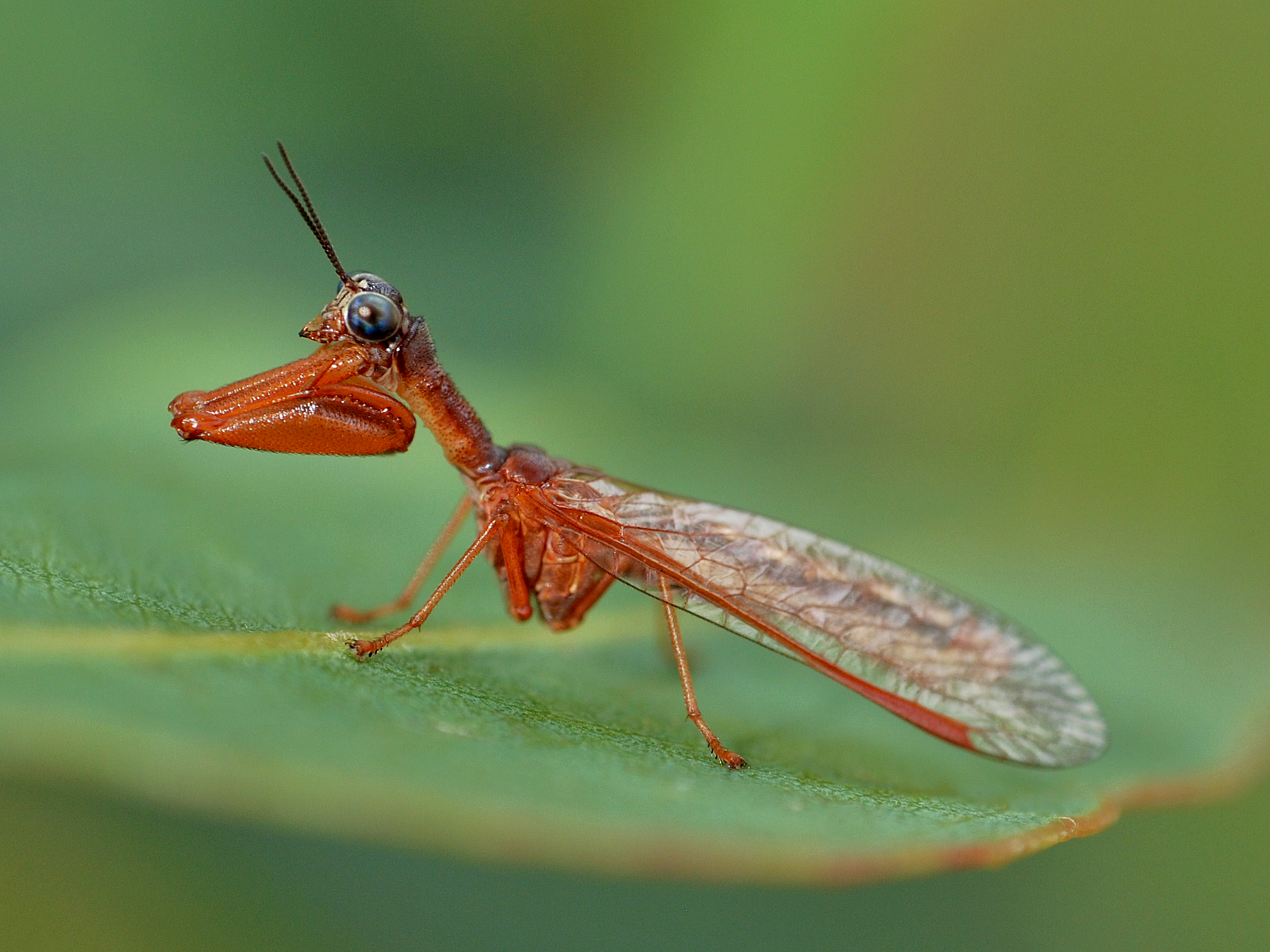
- Campion sp.

Scientific classification
- Kingdom: Animalia
- Phylum: Arthropoda
- Class: Insecta
- Order: Neuroptera
- Family: Mantispidae
- Subfamily: Mantispinae; Leach, 1815

= Mantispinae =

Subfamily of insects

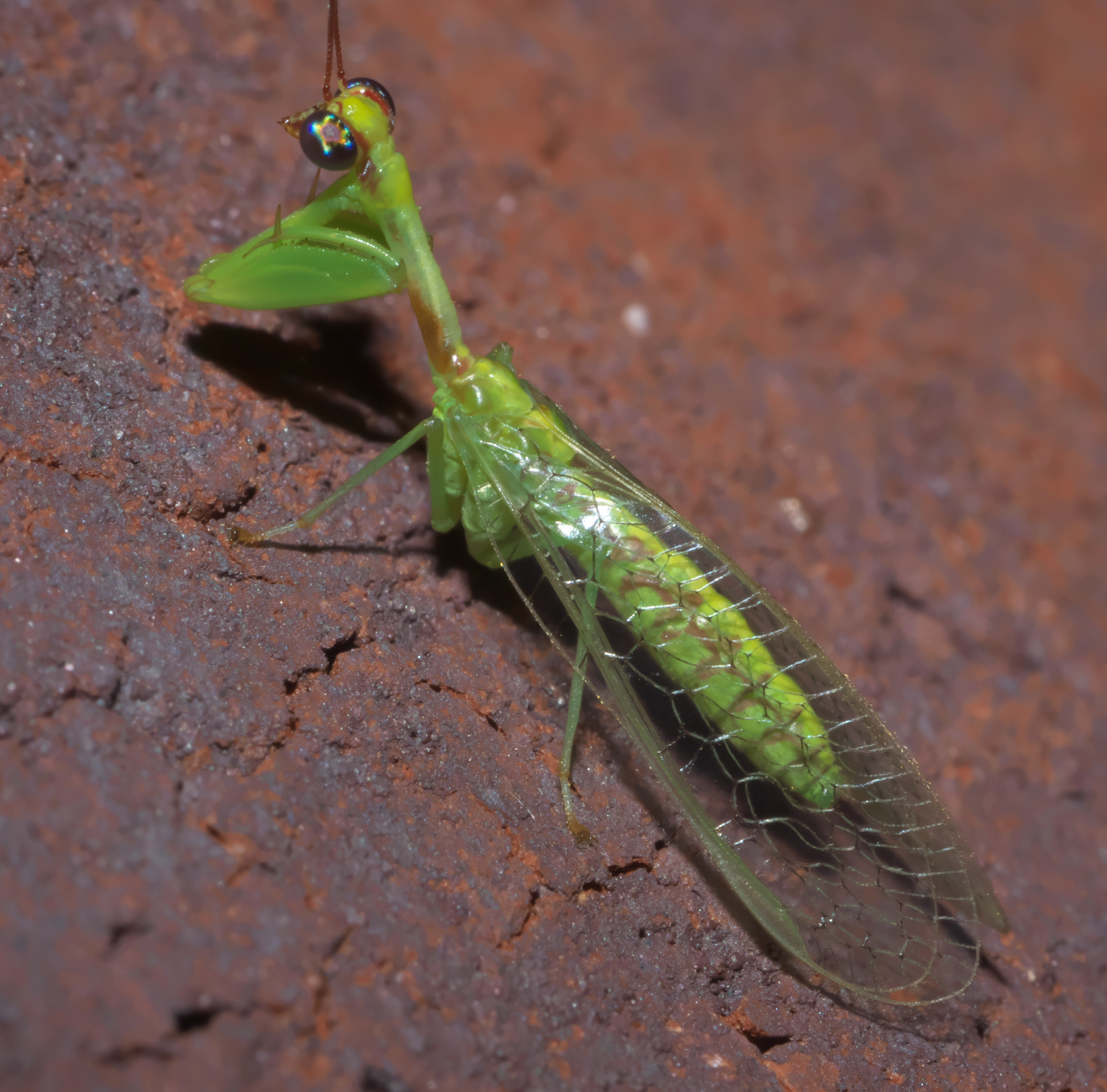
Zeugomantispa minuta

Mantispinae is a subfamily of mantisflies in the family Mantispidae. There are at least 30 genera and 310 described species in Mantispinae.

== Genera ==
These 33 genera belong to the subfamily Mantispinae:

- Afromantispa Snyman and Ohl in Snyman et al., 2012^{i c g}
- Asperala Lambkin, 1986^{i c g}
- Austroclimaciella Handschin, 1961^{i c g}
- Austromantispa Esben-Petersen, 1917^{i c g}
- Buyda Navás, 1926^{i c g}
- Campanacella Handschin, 1961^{i c g}
- Campion Navás, 1914^{i c g}
- Cercomantispa Handschin, 1959^{i c g}
- Climaciella Enderlein, 1910^{i c g b}
- Dicromantispa Hoffman in Penny, 2002^{i c g b}
- Entanoneura Enderlein, 1910^{i c g}
- Euclimacia Enderlein, 1910^{i g}
- Eumantispa Okamoto, 1910^{i c g}
- Haematomantispa Hoffman in Penny, 2002^{i c g}
- Leptomantispa Hoffman in Penny, 2002^{i c g b}
- Madantispa Fraser, 1952^{i c g}
- Mantispa Illiger in Kugelann, 1798^{i c g}
- Mimetispa Handschin, 1961^{i c g}
- Nampista Navás, 1914^{i c g}
- Necyla Navás, 1913^{i c g}
- Orientispa Poivre, 1984^{i c g}
- Paramantispa Williner and Kormilev, 1959^{i c g}
- Paulianella Handschin, 1960^{i c g}
- Pseudoclimaciella Handschin, 1960^{i c g}
- Rectinerva Handschin, 1959^{i c g}
- Sagittalata Handschin, 1959^{i c g}
- Spaminta Lambkin, 1986^{i c g}
- Stenomantispa Stitz, 1913^{i c g}
- Toolida Lambkin, 1986^{i c g}
- Tuberonotha Handschin, 1961^{i c g}
- Xaviera Lambkin, 1986^{i c g}
- Xeromantispa Hoffman in Penny, 2002^{i c g b}
- Zeugomantispa Hoffman in Penny, 2002^{i c g b}

Data sources: i = ITIS, c = Catalogue of Life, g = GBIF, b = Bugguide.net
