= Feroseta =

Feroseta Temporal range: Burdigalian

Scientific classification
- Kingdom: Animalia
- Phylum: Arthropoda
- Clade: Pancrustacea
- Class: Insecta
- Order: Neuroptera
- Family: Mantispidae
- Genus: †Feroseta; Poinar, 2006
- Species: †F. prisca

Binomial name
- †Feroseta prisca Poinar, 2006

Synonyms
- Feroseta priscus

Extinct genus of insects

Feroseta is an extinct genus of mantidfly in the neuropteran family Mantispidae known from a fossil found in North America, and which contains a single species, Feroseta prisca.

== History and classification ==
Feroseta prisca was described from a solitary fossil, which is preserved as an inclusion in a transparent chunk of Dominican amber, mined from the La Toca mine in the Dominican Republic. At the time of description the amber specimen was part of the Poinar Amber Collections, maintained by Oregon State University, as specimen number N-4-16. The holotype fossil is composed of a very complete adult male. The amber dates from at least the Burdigalian stage of the Miocene, based on studying the associated fossil foraminifera and may be as old as the Middle Eocene, based on the associated fossil coccoliths. This age range is due to the host rock being secondary deposits for the amber and the Miocene being the youngest age range that it might belong to.

The male holotype was first studied by noted amber researcher George Poinar Jr. from Oregon State University with his 2006 type description of the genus and species being published in the natural sciences journal Proceedings of the Entomological Society of Washington. The genus name was derived from a combination of the Latin "fero" meaning to bear and "seta" meaning bristle, a reference to the setae present on the wings of the species. The specific epithet prisca was coined from the Greek word "priscus" meaning ancient. The name was amended to F. prisca in 2007 by Michael Engel and David Grimaldi, who noted the genus name was of feminine gender, and prisca the correct species name structure. F. prisca is one of two mantidfly species described from Dominican amber. The other species, Dicromantispa moronei was described in 2007 by Engel and Grimaldi. Engel and Grimaldi also suggested the genus placement of the species to be dubious but did not state why they thought such.

== Description ==
The holotype male of F. prisca is nearly complete, only missing the fore-tarsus of the right foreleg. Overall the specimen is approximately 14.2 mm (0.56 in) long, based on measurement of the whole specimen as preserved in the amber. However measurement of the individual body segments yielded a length of approximately 15.9 mm (0.63 in). The forewings are 12 mm (0.47 in) and none of the wings show a darkened pterostigma. In place of the darkened pterostigma, the wings have a notable covering of bristles in the pterostigmal area. The antennae total 2.8 mm (0.11 in) in length, composed of 30 individual flagellomeres. The segments show a distinct pedicel structure, having a flared upper section and narrow more peg-like lower section. The six segments at the antennal tips are notably darkened and the apical segment on each antenna have elongated tips.
