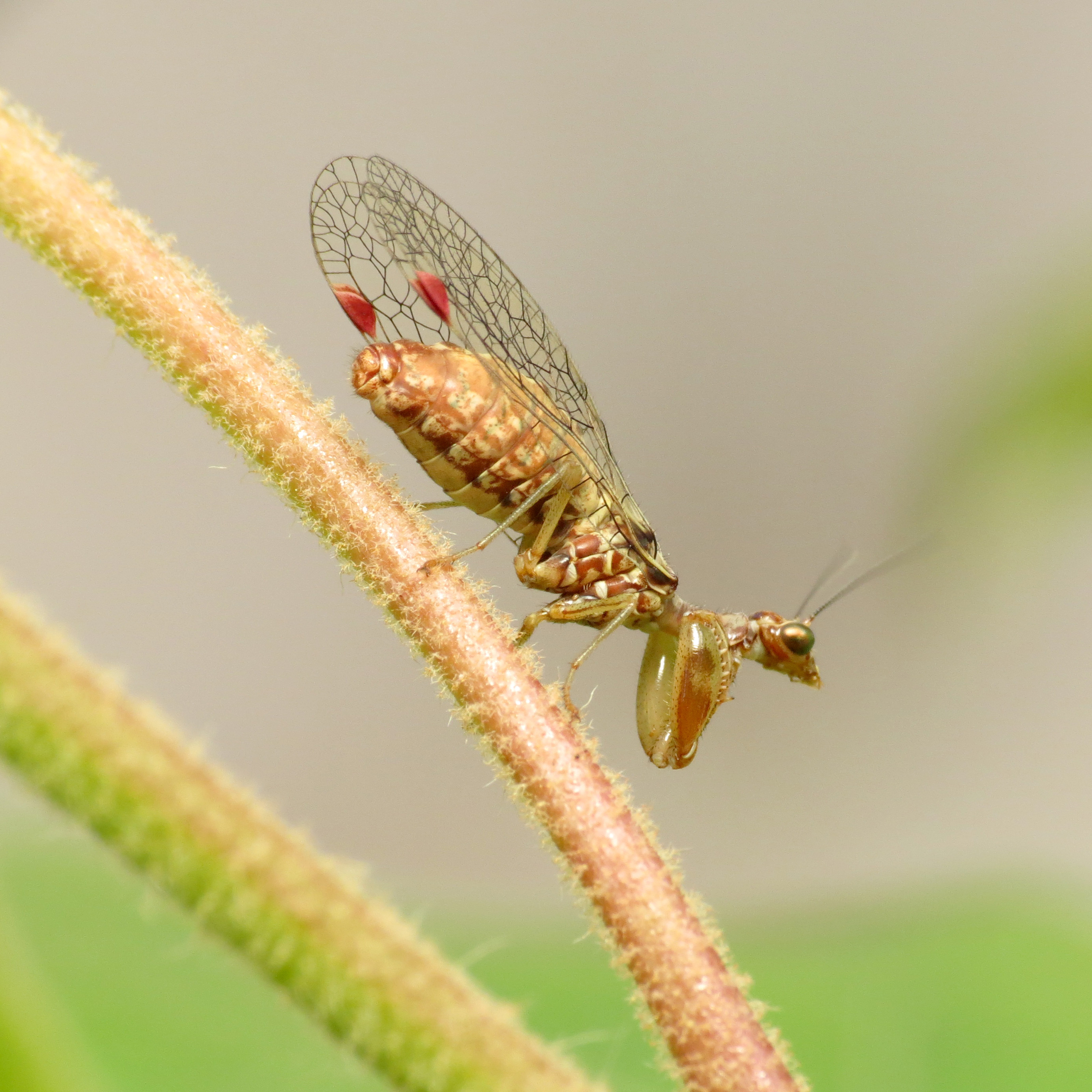

Scientific classification
- Domain: Eukaryota
- Kingdom: Animalia
- Phylum: Arthropoda
- Class: Insecta
- Order: Neuroptera
- Family: Mantispidae
- Genus: Nolima
- Species: N. dine

Binomial name
- Nolima dine Rehn, 1939

= Nolima dine =

Species of insect

Nolima dine is a species of mantidfly in the family Mantispidae.
