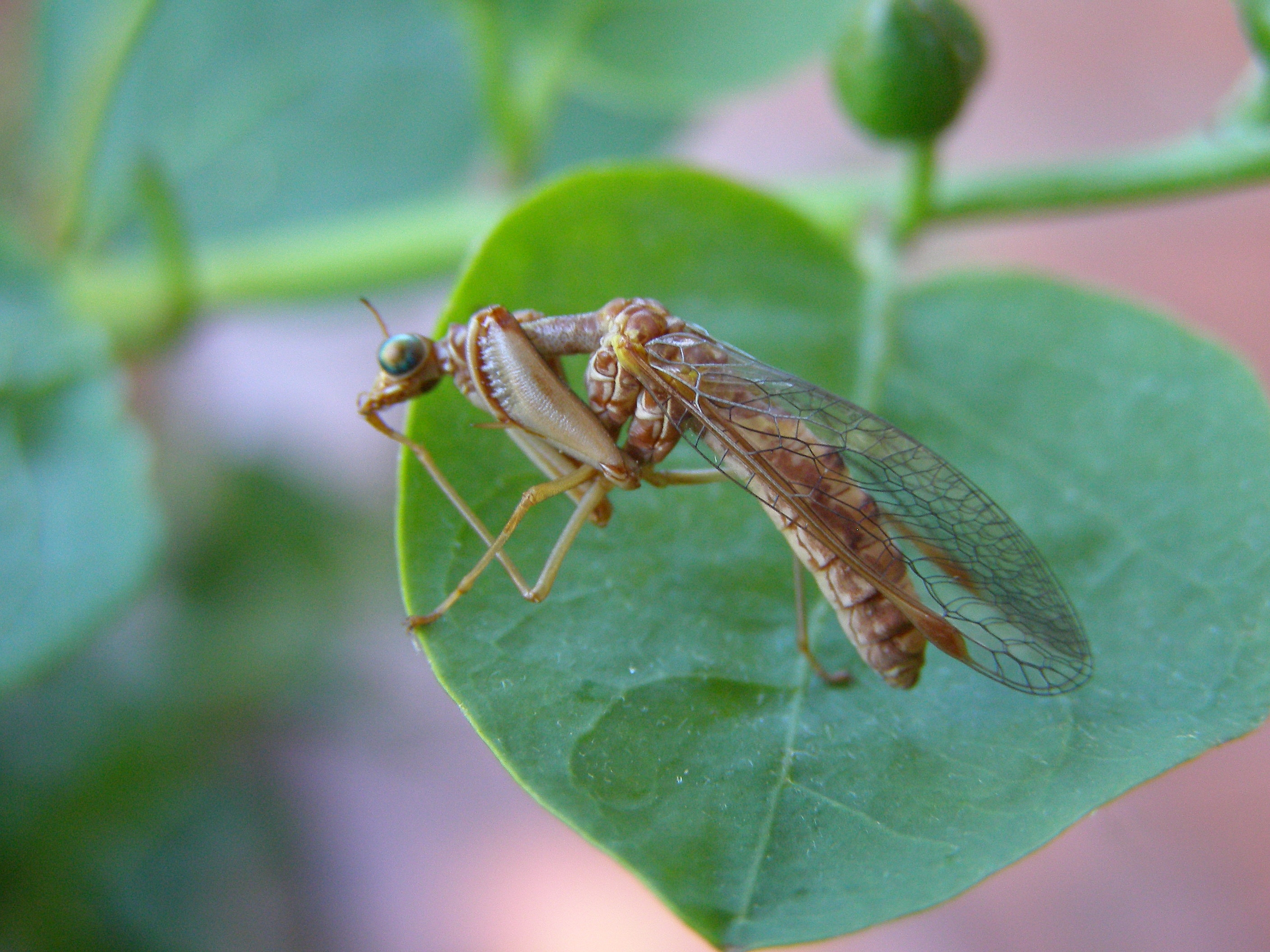
- Mantispa styriaca

Scientific classification
- Kingdom: Animalia
- Phylum: Arthropoda
- Clade: Pancrustacea
- Class: Insecta
- Order: Neuroptera
- Family: Mantispidae
- Subfamily: Mantispinae
- Genus: Mantispa; Illiger, 1798

Synonyms
- Amycla Rafinesque, 1815 [?] Mantispilla Enderlein, 1910 (but see Snyman, Sole, & Ohl, (2018) as restored).

= Mantispa =

Genus of insects

Mantispa is the type genus of insects in the family Mantispidae and subfamily Mantispinae of the order Neuroptera. Species have a fairly worldwide distribution (but not Australia).

== Etymology ==
The genus name Mantispa comes from "mantis" and "pagana", from the species name Mantis pagana.

== Description ==
The defining characteristic of Mantispa is the presence of dark, short, thick setae on the mesothorax and occiput (rear head segment).

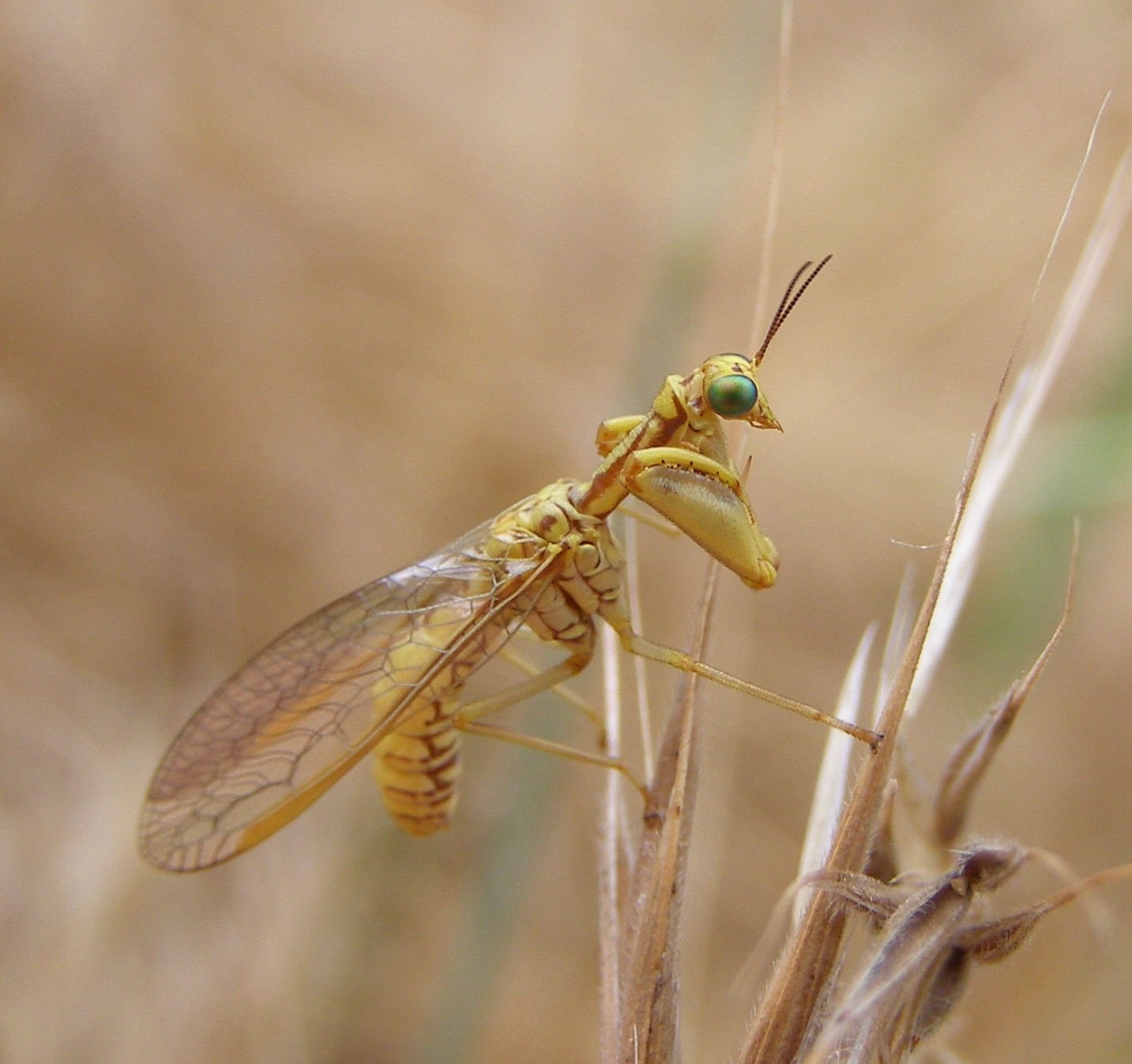
M. asphavexelte showing characteristic occiput and thorax

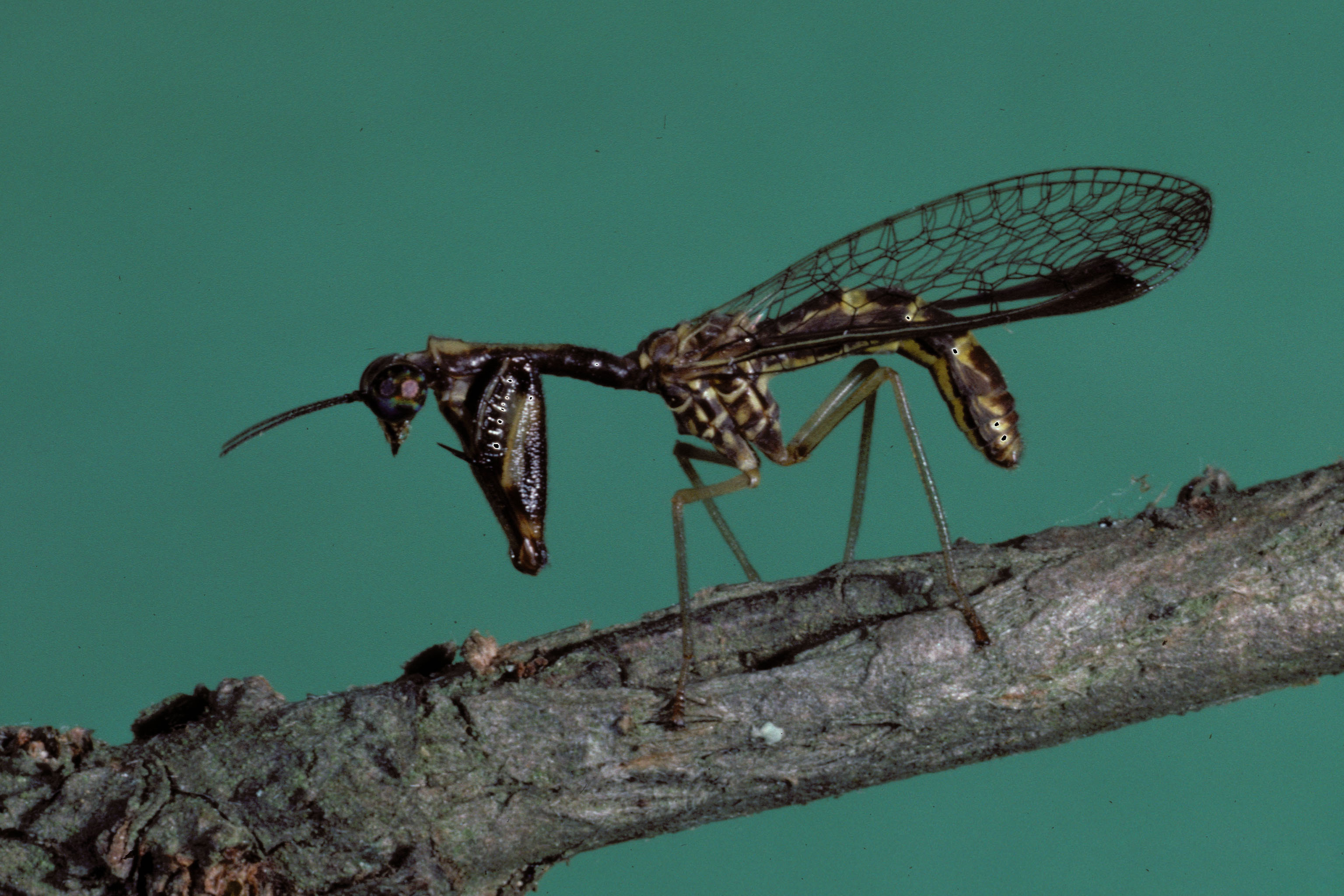
Mantispa sp.

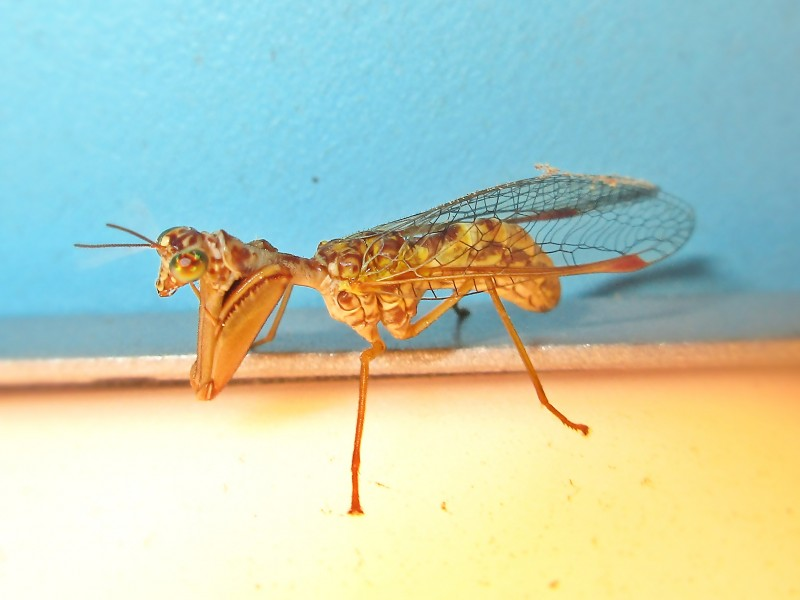
Mantispa styriaca

== Species ==
The Catalogue of Life lists:

- Mantispa adelungi Navás, 1912
- Mantispa agapeta (Navás, 1914)
- Mantispa alicante Banks, 1913
- Mantispa amabilis Gerstäcker, 1894
- Mantispa ambonensis Ohl, 2004
- Mantispa annulicornis Gerstäcker, 1894
- Mantispa aphavexelte U. Aspöck & H. Aspöck, 1994
- Mantispa ariasi Penny, 1983
- Mantispa axillaris Navás, 1908
- Mantispa azihuna (Stitz, 1913)
- Mantispa basalis (Navás, 1927)
- Mantispa basilei (Navás, 1930)
- Mantispa bella Kuwayama, 1925
- Mantispa bicolor (Stitz, 1913)
- Mantispa boliviana (Navás, 1927)
- Mantispa brevistigma C.-k. Yang, 1999
- Mantispa capeneri Handschin, 1959
- Mantispa castaneipennis Esben-Petersen, 1917
- Mantispa celebensis Enderlein, 1910
- Mantispa centenaria Esben-Petersen, 1917
- Mantispa chlorodes (Navás, 1914)
- Mantispa chlorotica (Navás, 1912)
- Mantispa chrysops Stitz, 1913
- Mantispa completa Banks, 1920
- Mantispa confluens Navás, 1914
- Mantispa coomani (Navás, 1930)
- Mantispa coorgensis Ohl, 2004
- Mantispa cora Newman, 1838
- Mantispa cordieri (Navás, 1933)
- Mantispa crenata Navás, 1914
- Mantispa decepta Banks, 1920
- Mantispa delicata (Navás, 1914)
- Mantispa deliciosa (Navás, 1927)
- Mantispa dispersa (Navás, 1914)
- Mantispa ellenbergeri (Navás, 1927)
- Mantispa elpidica (Navás, 1914)
- Mantispa enderleini Banks, 1914
- Mantispa fausta (Thunberg, 1784)
- Mantispa femoralis Navás, 1914
- Mantispa fenestralis Navás, 1914
- Mantispa finoti Navás, 1909
- Mantispa flavicauda (Navás, 1914)
- Mantispa flavinota Handschin, 1963
- Mantispa frontalis (Navás, 1914)
- Mantispa fuliginosa Loew in Hagen, 1859
- Mantispa fulvicornis Navás, 1929
- Mantispa fuscipennis Erichson, 1839
- Mantispa gillavryna (Navás, 1926)
- Mantispa gradata (Navás, 1926)
- Mantispa greeni Banks, 1913
- Mantispa gulosa Taylor, 1862
- Mantispa guttula Fairmaire in Thomson, 1858
- Mantispa haematina (Navás, 1914)
- Mantispa haugi Navás, 1909
- Mantispa indica Westwood, 1852
- Mantispa iridipennis Guérin-Méneville, 1844
- Mantispa japonica McLachlan, 1875
- Mantispa javanica Westwood, 1852
- Mantispa latifrons Enderlein, 1910
- Mantispa lineaticollis Enderlein, 1910
- Mantispa lineolata Westwood, 1852
- Mantispa lobata Navás, 1912
- Mantispa loveni (Navás, 1928)
- Mantispa luederwaldti Enderlein, 1910
- Mantispa lurida Walker, 1860
- Mantispa lutea (Stitz, 1913)
- Mantispa luzonensis Navás, 1909
- Mantispa maindroni Navás, 1909
- Mantispa mandarina Navás, 1914
- Mantispa marshalli (Navás, 1914)
- Mantispa meadewaldina (Navás, 1914)
- Mantispa melanocera (Navás, 1913)
- Mantispa militaris (Navás, 1914)
- Mantispa moluccensis Banks, 1913
- Mantispa moucheti (Navás, 1925)
- Mantispa moulti Navás, 1909
- Mantispa nana (Lichtenstein, 1802)
- Mantispa nanyukina (Navás, 1933)
- Mantispa navasi Handschin, 1960
- Mantispa negusa Navás, 1914
- Mantispa neotropica Navás, 1933
- Mantispa neptunica Navás, 1914
- Mantispa newmani Banks, 1920
- Mantispa nubila (Stitz, 1913)
- Mantispa obscurata (Navás, 1914)
- Mantispa pallescens Stitz, 1913
- Mantispa paraguayana Ohl, 2004
- Mantispa parvula Penny, 1983
- Mantispa pasteuri Navás, 1909
- Mantispa pehlkei Enderlein, 1910
- Mantispa perla (Pallas, 1772)
- Mantispa phaeonota Navás, 1933
- Mantispa plicicollis Handschin, 1935
- Mantispa punctata (Stitz, 1913)
- Mantispa pygmaea (Stitz, 1913)
- Mantispa radialis (Navás, 1929)
- Mantispa radiata (Navás, 1914)
- Mantispa rimata (Navás, 1929)
- Mantispa rufescens Latreille, 1807
- Mantispa salana (Navás, 1931)
- Mantispa scabricollis McLachlan in Fedchenko, 1875
- Mantispa schoutedeni (Navás, 1929)
- Mantispa scutellaris Westwood, 1852
- Mantispa similata (Navás, 1922)
- Mantispa simplex Stitz, 1913
- Mantispa stenoptera Gerstäcker, 1888
- Mantispa stigmata (Stitz, 1913)
- Mantispa strigipes Westwood, 1852
- Mantispa styriaca (Poda, 1761)
- Mantispa subcostalis Navás, 1929
- Mantispa taina (Alayo, 1968)
- Mantispa tenella Erichson, 1839
- Mantispa tenera (Navás, 1914)
- Mantispa tessmanni (Stitz, 1913)
- Mantispa thomensis Viette, 1958
- Mantispa tonkinensis Navás, 1930
- Mantispa transversa (Stitz, 1913)
- Mantispa umbripennis Walker, 1860
- Mantispa uniformis (Navás, 1927)
- Mantispa variolosa Navás, 1914
- Mantispa venulosa (Navás, 1914)
- Mantispa verruculata (Navás, 1914)
- Mantispa virescens Rambur, 1842
- Mantispa zayasi (Alayo, 1968)
- Mantispa zonaria Navás, 1925
- Mantispa zonata Navás, 1923
