= Dicromantispa moronei =

Dicromantispa moronei Temporal range: Burdigalian

Scientific classification
- Kingdom: Animalia
- Phylum: Arthropoda
- Clade: Pancrustacea
- Class: Insecta
- Order: Neuroptera
- Family: Mantispidae
- Genus: Dicromantispa
- Species: D. moronei

Binomial name
- Dicromantispa moronei Engel & Grimaldi, 2007

Extinct species of insect

Dicromantispa moronei is an extinct species of mantidfly in the neuropteran family Mantispidae known from a fossil found in the Caribbean.

== History and classification ==
Dicromantispa moronei was described from a solitary female holotype fossil which is preserved as an inclusion in a transparent chunk of Dominican amber. When first published, the amber resided in a private amber collection owned by Ettore Morone of Turin, Italy. The amber dates from at least the Burdigalian stage of the Miocene, based on studying the associated fossil Foraminifera and may be as old as the Middle Eocene, based on the associated fossil coccoliths. This age range is due to the host rock being secondary deposits for the amber and the Miocene the age range is only the youngest that it might be.

The female was first studied by entomologists Michael Engel of the university of Kansas and David Grimaldi of the American Museum of Natural History with their 2007 type description of the species was published in the natural sciences journal American Museum Novitates. The specific epithet moronei is a patronym honoring Ettore Morone. D. moronei is one of two fossil Dicromantispa species Engel and Grimaldi described in 2007. The other species, D. electromexicana, is from the similarly aged Mexican amber of Chiapas, Mexico.

== Description ==
The holotype female of D. moronei is complete. Overall, the specimen is about 17.7 mm (0.70 in) long, with 14.5-mm (0.57-in) forewings and a 7.7-mm (0.30-in) pronotum. Between D. electromexicana and D. moronei the shorter, wider, pronotum of D. moronei along with the smaller size and longer profemoral spine of D. electromexicana separate the two species. The head is lacking an occipital margin and the antennae are a light brown in coloration. The antennae are composed of 29 flagellomeres, with ones closer to the base longer than wide and ones closer to the tip wider than long.
