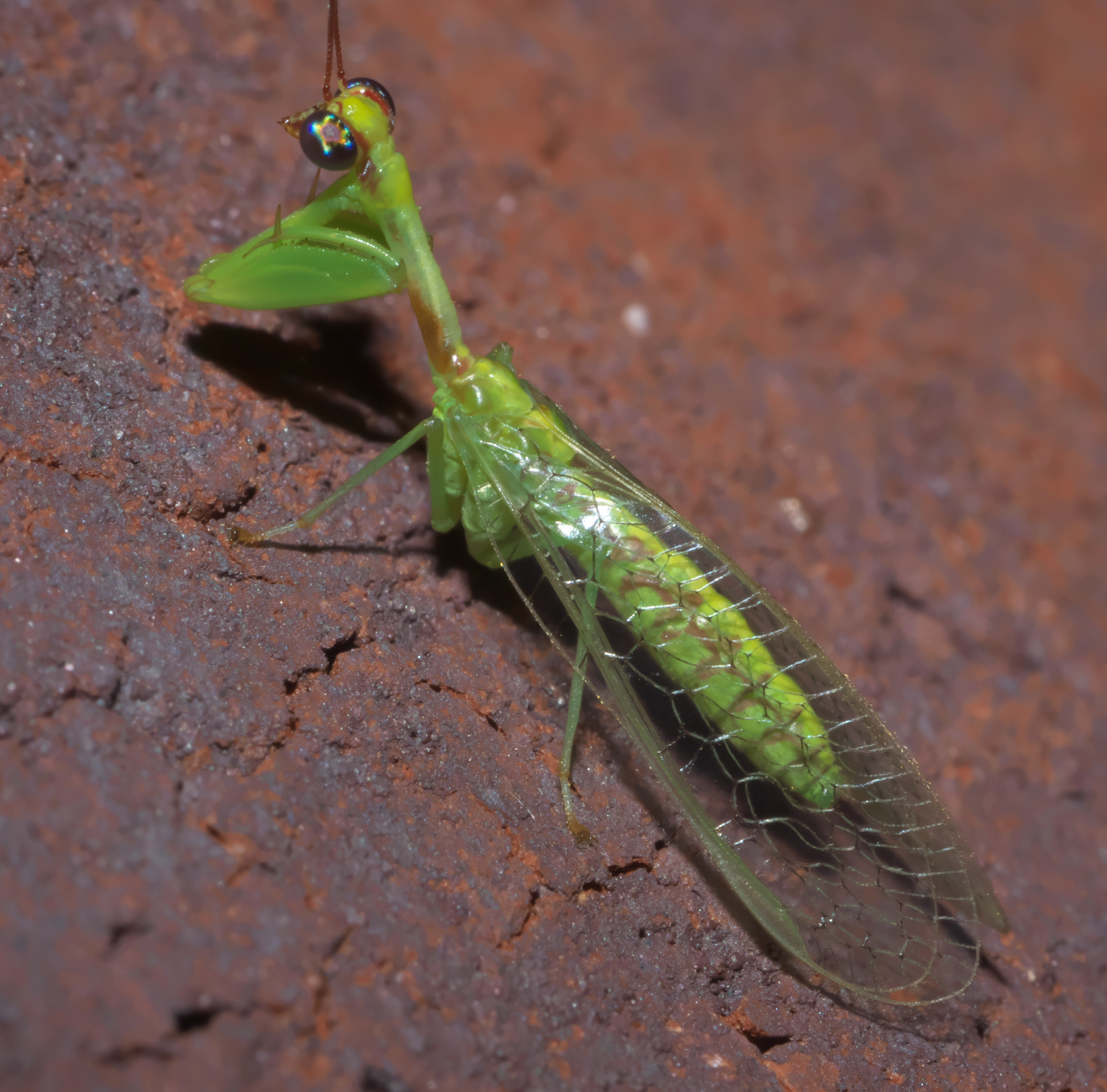
- Zeugomantispa minuta

Scientific classification
- Kingdom: Animalia
- Phylum: Arthropoda
- Clade: Pancrustacea
- Class: Insecta
- Order: Neuroptera
- Family: Mantispidae
- Subfamily: Mantispinae
- Genus: Zeugomantispa; Hoffman in Penny, 2002

= Zeugomantispa =

Genus of insects

Zeugomantispa, the green mantidflies, is a genus of mantidflies in the family Mantispidae.

== Distribution and habitat ==
The species of Zeugomantispa are found in the Americas from the United States to Argentina.The species are exclusively neotroical apart from Z. minuta, which is the only species to occur in the United States.

== Description and identification ==
Zeugomantispa is a genus of green-colored mantidflies. The vertex of the head is concave, and the pronotum is covered with bumps that produce setae. Their raptorial forelegs have a single tarsal claw. The forewings are hyaline and unmarked apart from the pterostigma.

== Species ==
There are 6 described species of Zeugomantispa:

- Zeugomantispa chlorodes (Navás, 1914)
- Zeugomantispa chlorotica (Navás, 1912)
- Zeugomantispa compellens (Walker, 1860)
- Zeugomantispa femoralis (Navás, 1914)
- Zeugomantispa minuta (Fabricius, 1775)
- Zeugomantispa virescens (Rambur, 1842)
