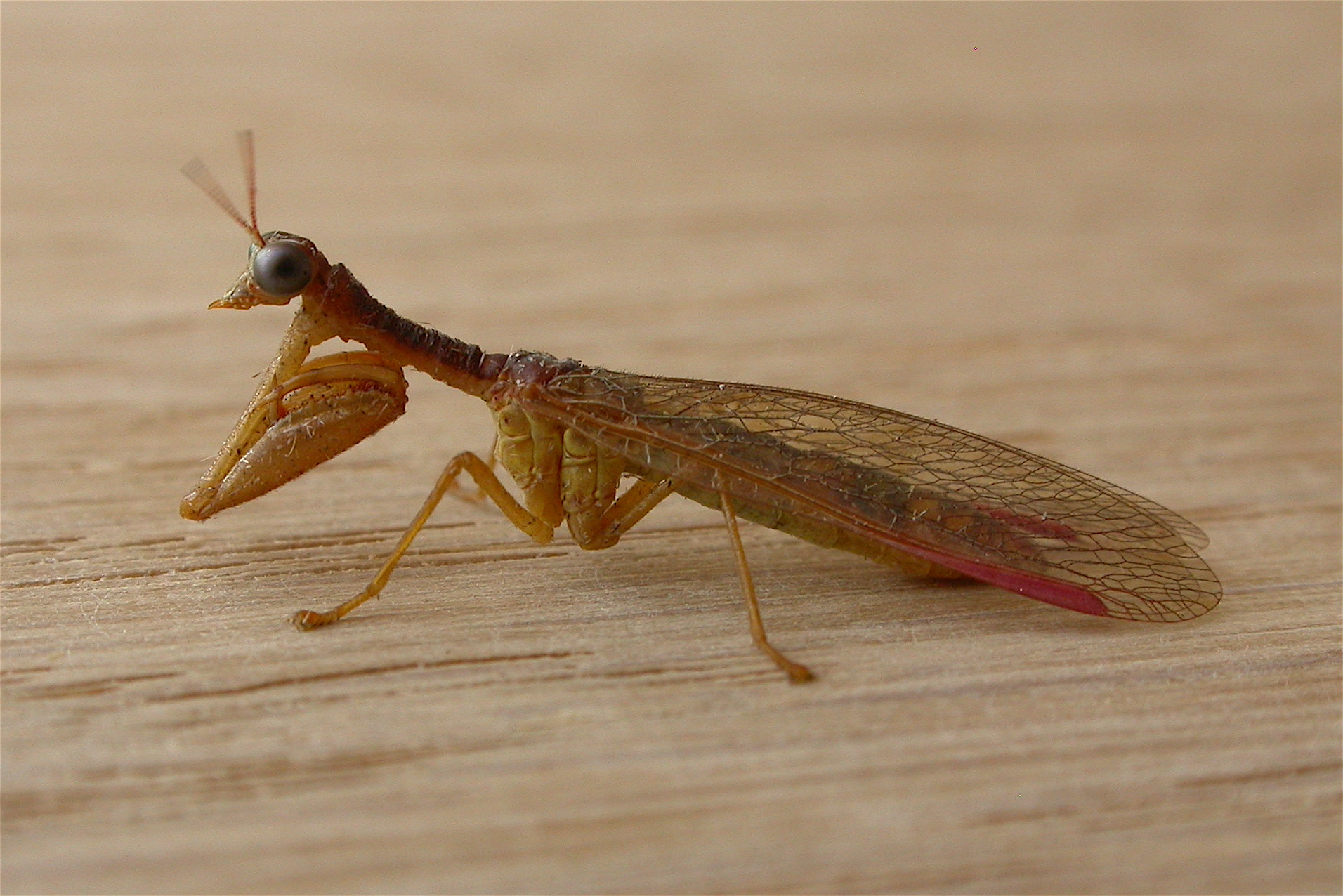
- Campion callosus

Scientific classification
- Kingdom: Animalia
- Phylum: Arthropoda
- Clade: Pancrustacea
- Class: Insecta
- Order: Neuroptera
- Family: Mantispidae
- Subfamily: Mantispinae
- Genus: Campion; Navás, 1914

= Campion (lacewing) =

Genus of insects

Campion is a genus of mantisflies belonging to the subfamily Mantispinae.

The species of this genus are endemic to Australia, where they are widely distributed. Like most mantispids, they are homometabolous, with eggs laid on bark or other surfaces and parasitism of spider egg sacs practiced by larvae after hatching. Known hosts of Campion larvae include lycosid spiders and tarantulas.

Campion species are similar in appearance and may be difficult to distinguish.

Species:

- Campion australasiae (Guérin-Méneville, 1844)
- Campion callosus Lambkin, 1986
- Campion chrysops (Stitz, 1913)
- Campion cruciferus (Navás, 1914)
- Campion impressus (Navás, 1914)
- Campion kroombitensis Lambkin & New, 1994
- Campion rubellus Navás, 1914
- Campion spiniferus Lambkin, 1986
- Campion tenuistriga (Gerstaecker, 1885)
- Campion vittatus (Guérin-Ménéville, 1831)
