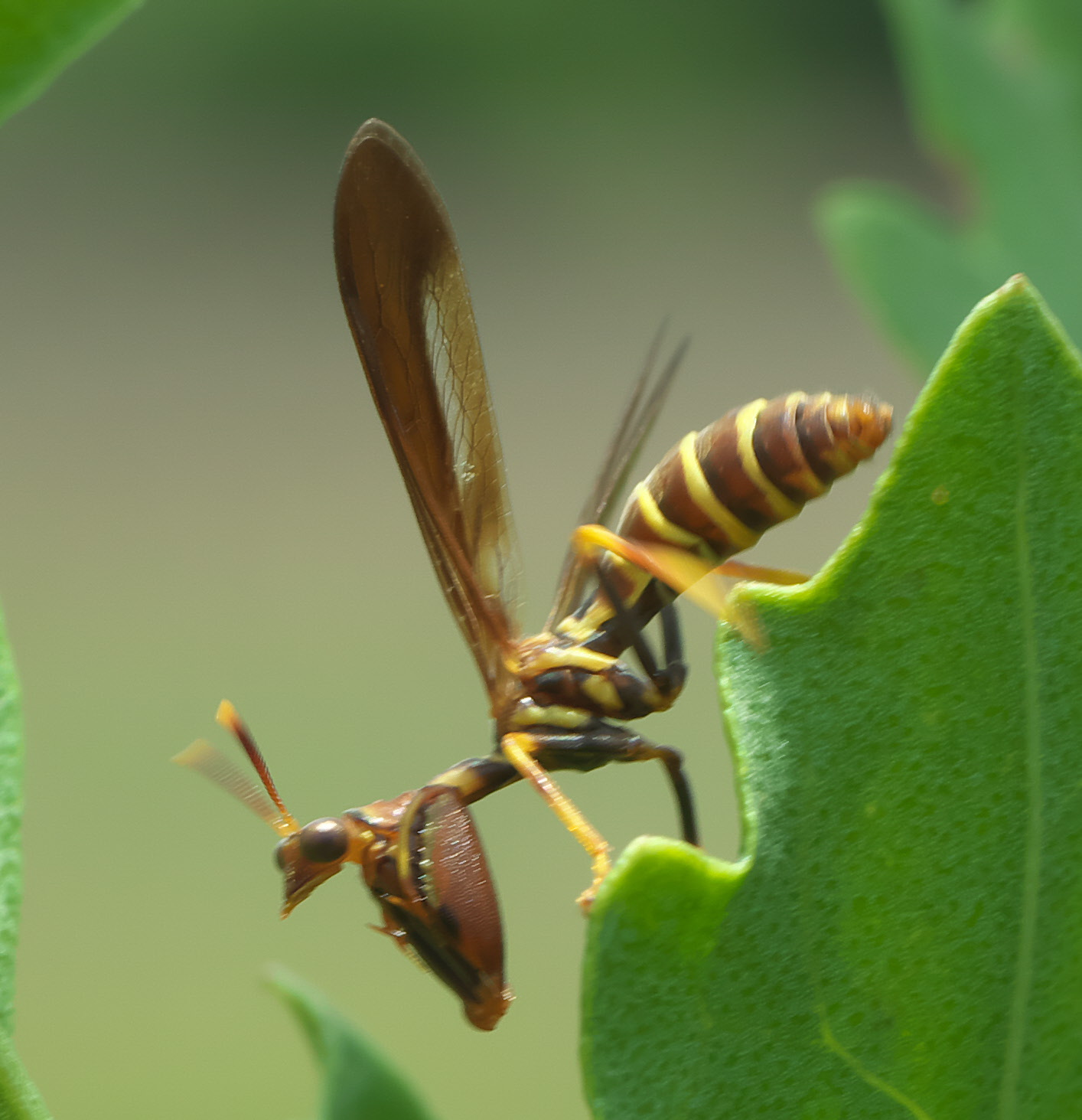
- Climaciella brunnea

Scientific classification
- Kingdom: Animalia
- Phylum: Arthropoda
- Clade: Pancrustacea
- Class: Insecta
- Order: Neuroptera
- Family: Mantispidae
- Subfamily: Mantispinae
- Genus: Climaciella; Enderlein, 1910

= Climaciella =

Genus of wasp mantidflies

Climaciella is a genus of wasp mantidflies in the family Mantispidae. There are about 10 described species in Climaciella, found in North, Central, and South America. Climaciella brunnea, a wasp mimic, is a common species found in Central and North America.

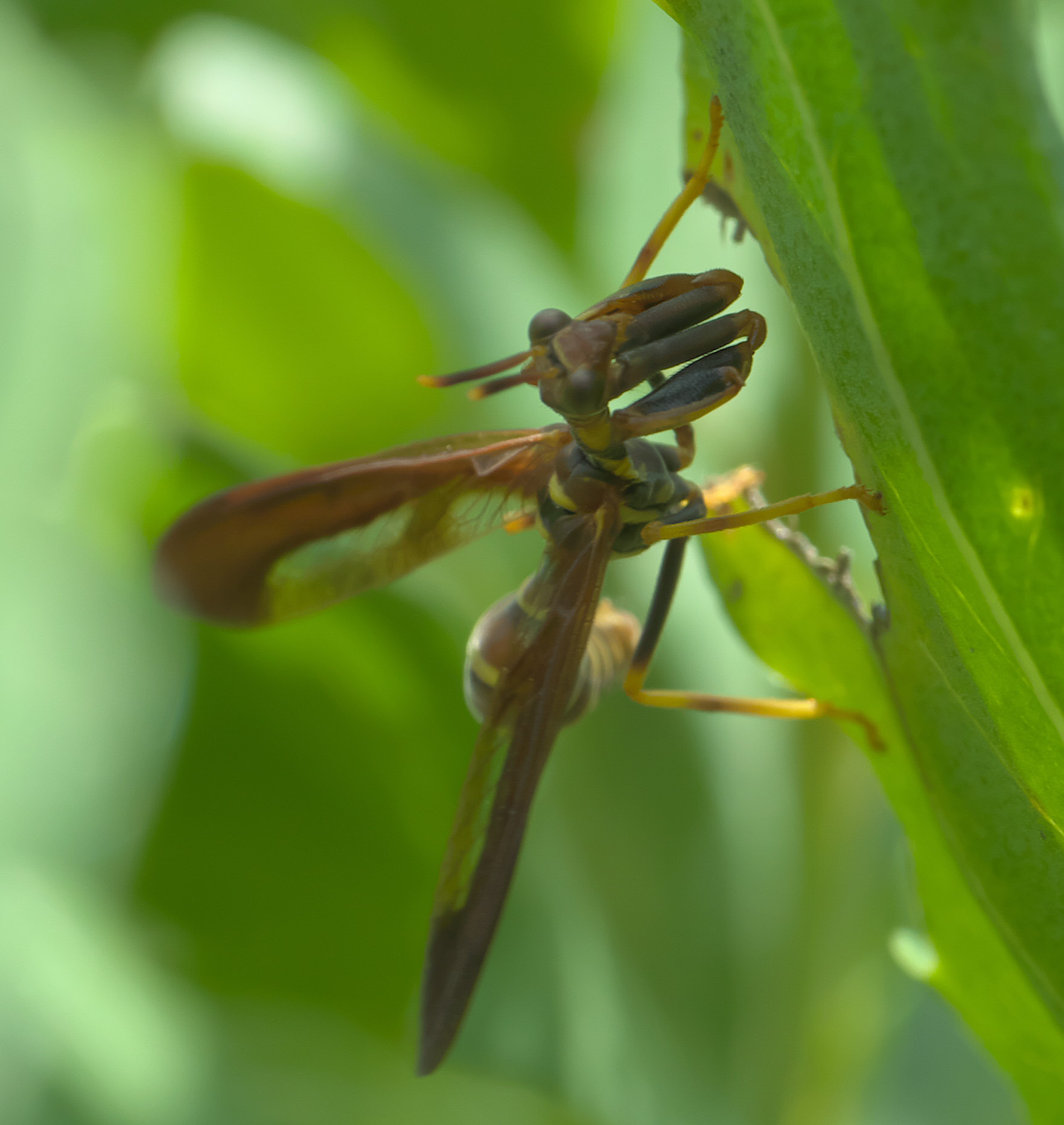
Climaciella brunnea

== Species ==
These 10 species belong to the genus Climaciella:

- Climaciella amapaensis Penny, 1983
- Climaciella brunnea (Say in Keating, 1824) (wasp mantidfly)
- Climaciella cubana Enderlein, 1910
- Climaciella duckei Navás, 1915
- Climaciella obtusa Hoffman, 2002
- Climaciella personata (Stitz, 1913)
- Climaciella porosa Hoffman, 2002
- Climaciella rafaeli Calle Tobón et al., 2018
- Climaciella semihyalina (Le Peletier de Saint Fargeau & Audinet-Serville, 1825)
- † Climaciella henrotayi Nel, 1989
