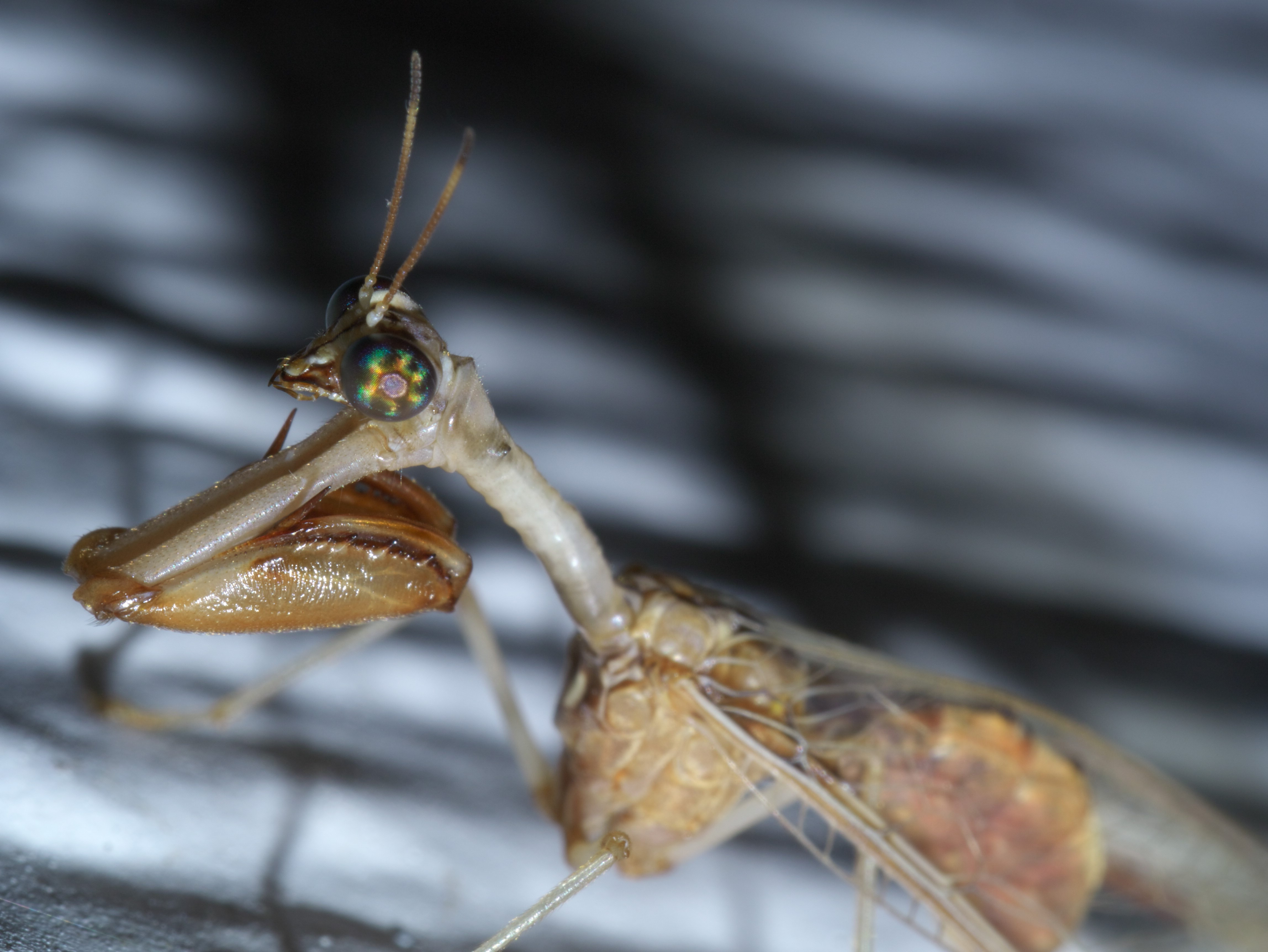
- Dicromantispa interrupta

Scientific classification
- Kingdom: Animalia
- Phylum: Arthropoda
- Clade: Pancrustacea
- Class: Insecta
- Order: Neuroptera
- Family: Mantispidae
- Subfamily: Mantispinae
- Genus: Dicromantispa; Hoffman in Penny, 2002

= Dicromantispa =

Genus of insects

Dicromantispa is a genus of mantidflies in the family Mantispidae. There are about 10 described species in Dicromantispa.

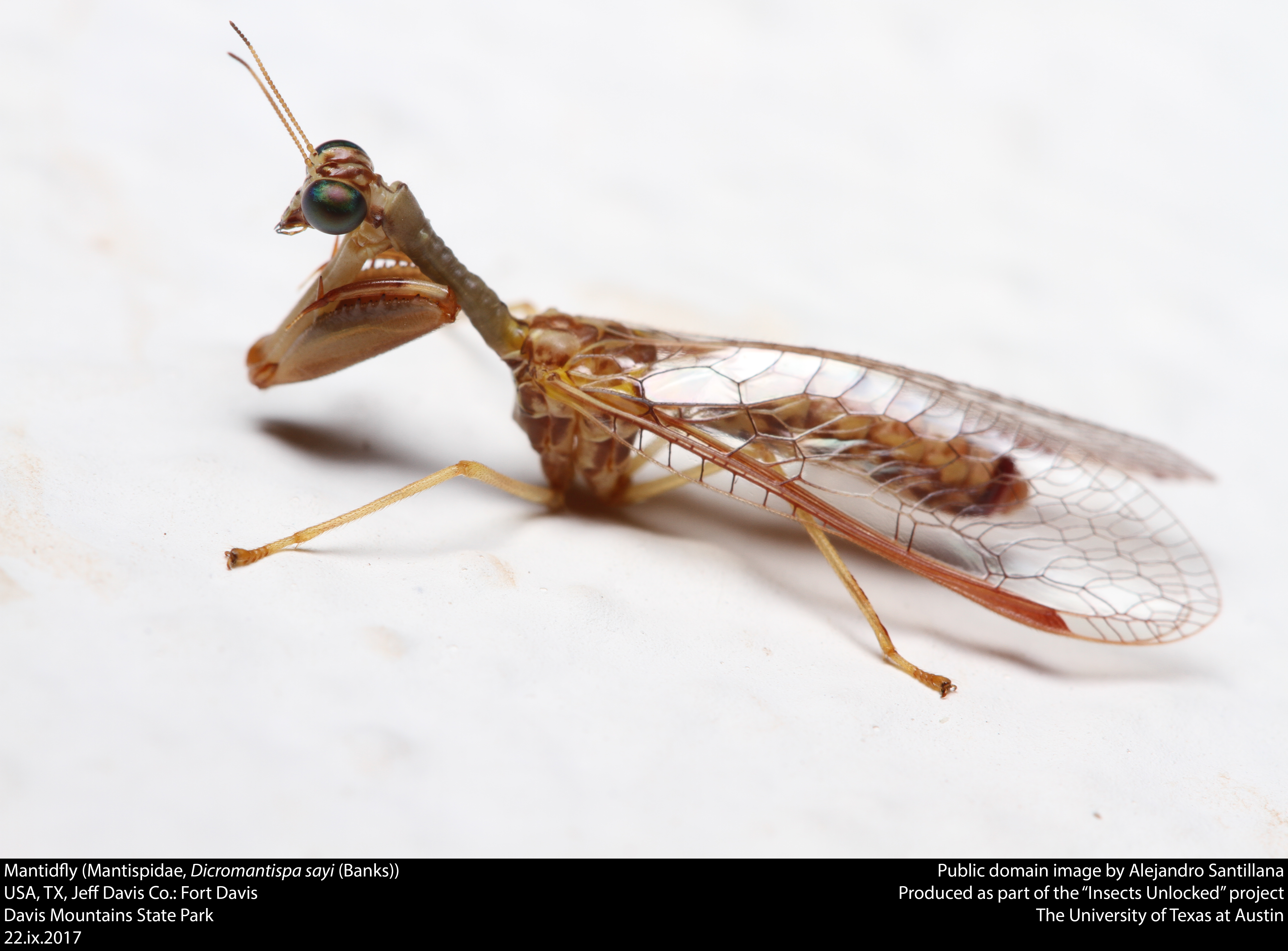
Dicromantispa sayi

== Species ==
These 10 species belong to the genus Dicromantispa:

- Dicromantispa debilis (Gerstaecker, 1888)
- Dicromantispa electromexicana Engel & Grimaldi, 2007
- Dicromantispa gracilis (Erichson, 1839)
- Dicromantispa hyalina Pires Machado & Rafael, 2010
- Dicromantispa interrupta (Say, 1825)
- Dicromantispa leucophaea Pires Machado & Rafael, 2010
- Dicromantispa moronei Engel & Grimaldi, 2007
- Dicromantispa moulti (Navás, 1909)
- Dicromantispa sayi (Banks, 1897)
- Dicromantispa synapsis Hoffman in Penny, 2002
