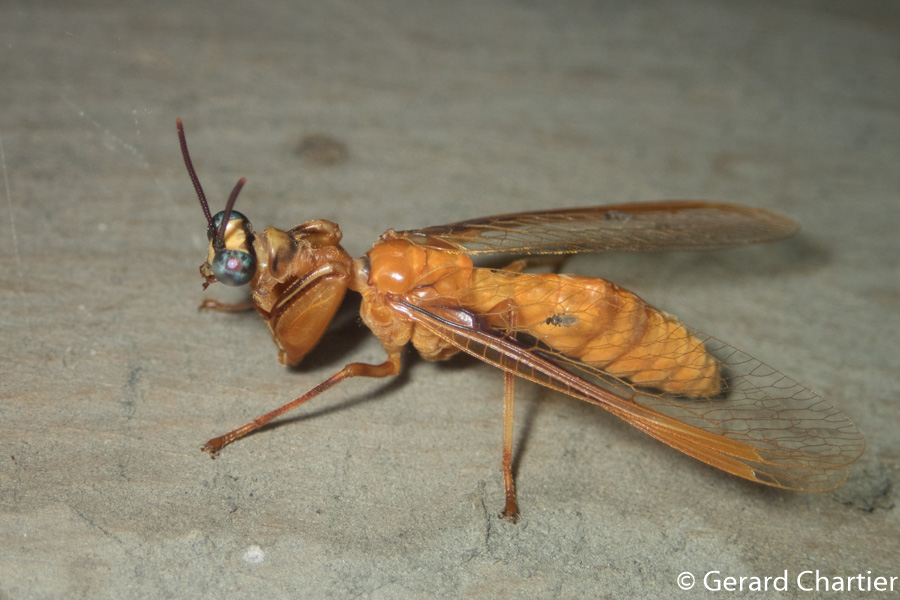
- Tuberonotha sp.

Scientific classification
- Kingdom: Animalia
- Phylum: Arthropoda
- Clade: Pancrustacea
- Class: Insecta
- Order: Neuroptera
- Family: Mantispidae
- Subfamily: Mantispinae
- Genus: Tuberonotha; Handschin, 1961

= Tuberonotha =

Genus of mantisflies

Tuberonotha is a genus of Asian mantisflies in the subfamily Mantispinae, erected by Eduard Handschin in 1961.

== Species ==
The Global Biodiversity Information Facility lists:

1. Tuberonotha bouchardi (Navás, 1909)
2. Tuberonotha campioni (Navás, 1914)
3. Tuberonotha ferrosa (Navás, 1914)
4. Tuberonotha regia (Navás, 1930)
5. Tuberonotha sinica (C.-k.Yang, 1999)
6. Tuberonotha strenua (Gerstaecker, 1894)
