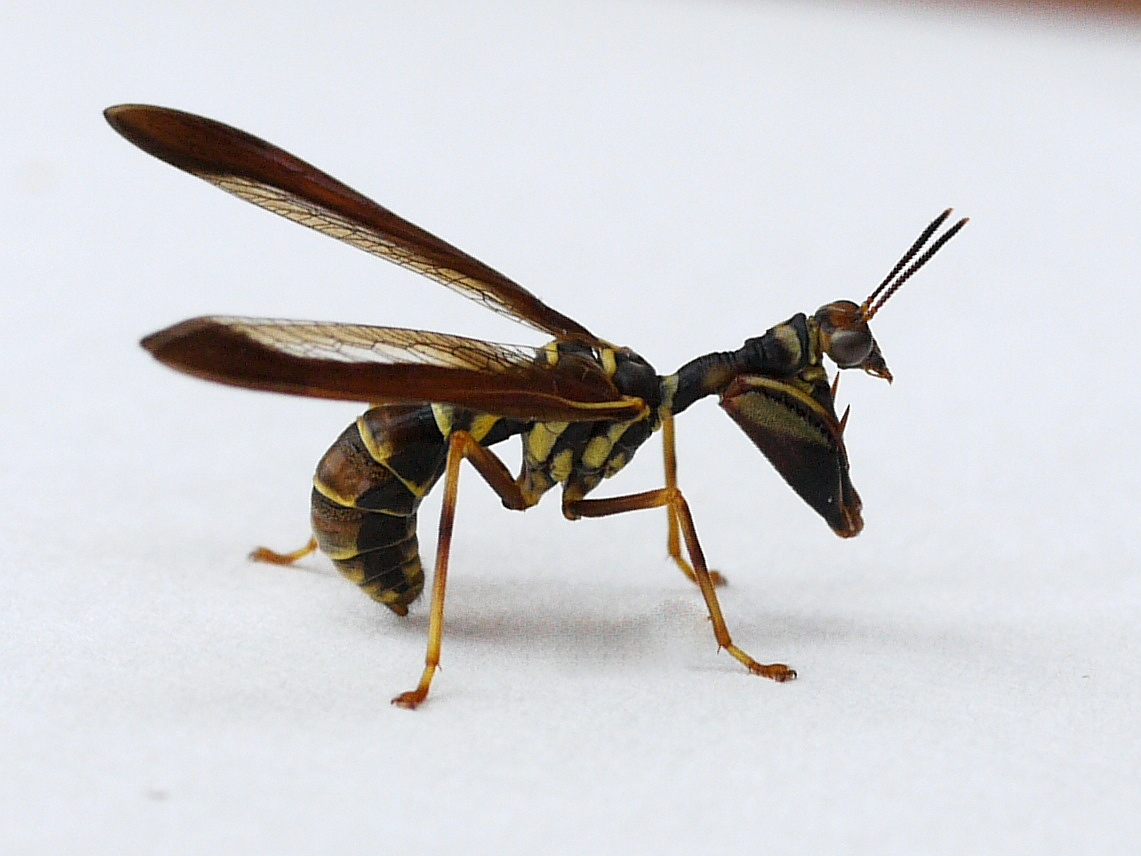
- Climaciella brunnea in Cross Plains, Wisconsin, USA

Scientific classification
- Kingdom: Animalia
- Phylum: Arthropoda
- Clade: Pancrustacea
- Class: Insecta
- Order: Neuroptera
- Family: Mantispidae
- Genus: Climaciella
- Species: C. brunnea

Binomial name
- Climaciella brunnea (Say in Keating, 1824)

Synonyms
- Climaciella brunnea var. instabilis Opler, 1981; Climaciella rubescens Stitz, 1913; Climaciella rubescens var. laciniata Stitz, 1913; Climaciella rubescens var. unicolor Stitz, 1913; Mantispa brunnea Banks, 1911; Climaciella brunnea var. occidentis (Banks, 1911); Climaciella occidentis (Banks, 1911); Climaciella varia var. occidentis (Banks, 1911); Climaciella brunnea (Banks, 1911); Mantispa brunnea var. occidentis Banks, 1911; Mantispa burquei Provancher, 1875; Mantispa denaria Taylor, 1862; Mantispa moesta Hagen, 1861; Climaciella varia (Erichson, 1839); Symphrasis varia (Erichson, 1839); Mantispa varia Erichson, 1839; Mantispa brunnea Say, 1824

= Climaciella brunnea =

Species of insect

Climaciella brunnea, known sometimes by the common names wasp mantidfly, western mantidfly, and brown mantidfly, is a predatory neuropteran insect in the family Mantispidae.

== Description ==
C. brunnea has a triangular head with large, compound eyes and a broad frons. It has straight antennae. Its raptorial forelegs are similar in shape and function to that of Mantodea; this adaptation has evolved independently in the two groups and is an example of convergent evolution. The wings of C. brunnea are distinctive in that they are often characterized by having thick brown edges and transparent inner edges. The species has a body length of 2 to 3 cm.

Its markings mimic those of wasp species within the Polistes genus. C. brunnea exhibits a large amount of color polymorphism as many groups will mimic the colorations of specific wasps found within their respective region.

== Taxonomy ==
Climaciella brunnea is a species in the genus Climaciella and the family Mantispidae. It is in the order Neuroptera, or the net-winged insects.

== Distribution ==
Climaciella brunnea is found in Canada, the United States, and as far south as Nicaragua. While finding a single C. brunnea alone is difficult, the species is most commonly seen in aggregations. Attracted to a male pheromone, groups of C. brunnea will accumulate in areas to breed and feed.

Adults can be found sitting on vegetation or flowers in forest clearings. Individuals are often found on flower heads waiting for prey or feeding on nectar. Thus, it has some effect on pollination and is known as a casual pollinator.

== Life cycle ==
First instar larvae of this species are campodeiform and will use phoretic behavior in an attempt to find an adult spider. C. brunnea specializes on lycosid spiders. The larvae have a unique adaptation known as a caudal sucker that they use to attach themselves to the substrate of their habitat. Once attached, they will lift themselves and begin to wave their body back and forth for a short period of time. Afterwards, if they have not grabbed onto a passing spider they will briefly rest before resuming their phoretic behavior.

Once on the adult spider, a C. brunnea larva will remain atop the carapace of the spider until either the spider copulates or begins to lay eggs. If the larva grabbed onto a male spider, they will quickly transfer to a female spider when the male mates. If the larva is attached to a female spider initially, it will remain on her until she lays eggs. Until then, the larva will subsist off the spider's hemolymph. Once the spider is ready to lay eggs, the C. brunnea larva will quickly move into the sticky fluid the spider is using to construct the egg sac and thus the larva becomes trapped within the sac.

Inside, the larva will use its specially adapted sucking tube (made from its maxilla and mandibles) to feed off the spider eggs within the sac.

== Behavior ==
As adults, C. brunnea displays many striking defensive and reproductive behaviors. When disturbed, adults perform two defensive behaviors. The first involves the C. brunnea individual curling its abdomen beneath itself, likely mimicking a stinging wasp. The second defensive behavior is where the mantidfly holds the tip of its abdomen vertically as it begins to move itself in a back and forth motion. This likely not only mimics a stinging wasp but it also shows the striking coloration on the insect's abdomen.

== Reproduction ==
Males of the C. brunnea species will attract females using a distinctive pheromone. Once a female is found, the males will then perform an elaborate courtship ritual. They will spread and raise their wings repeatedly while also extending and stretching their raptorial forelegs. The males will repeatedly do this for a few minutes before stopping and continuing if there is no response.

If a female is receptive, the two insects will then begin to mate. Pairs may be in copulation for up to a day. Once finished, the male will leave a spermatophore on the female's genitalia. Over the next few days, she will absorb this spermatophore and begin fertilizing her eggs. After fertilizing the eggs, the female C. brunnea will oviposit her eggs sporadically and in crescent shaped groupings.

== Gallery ==
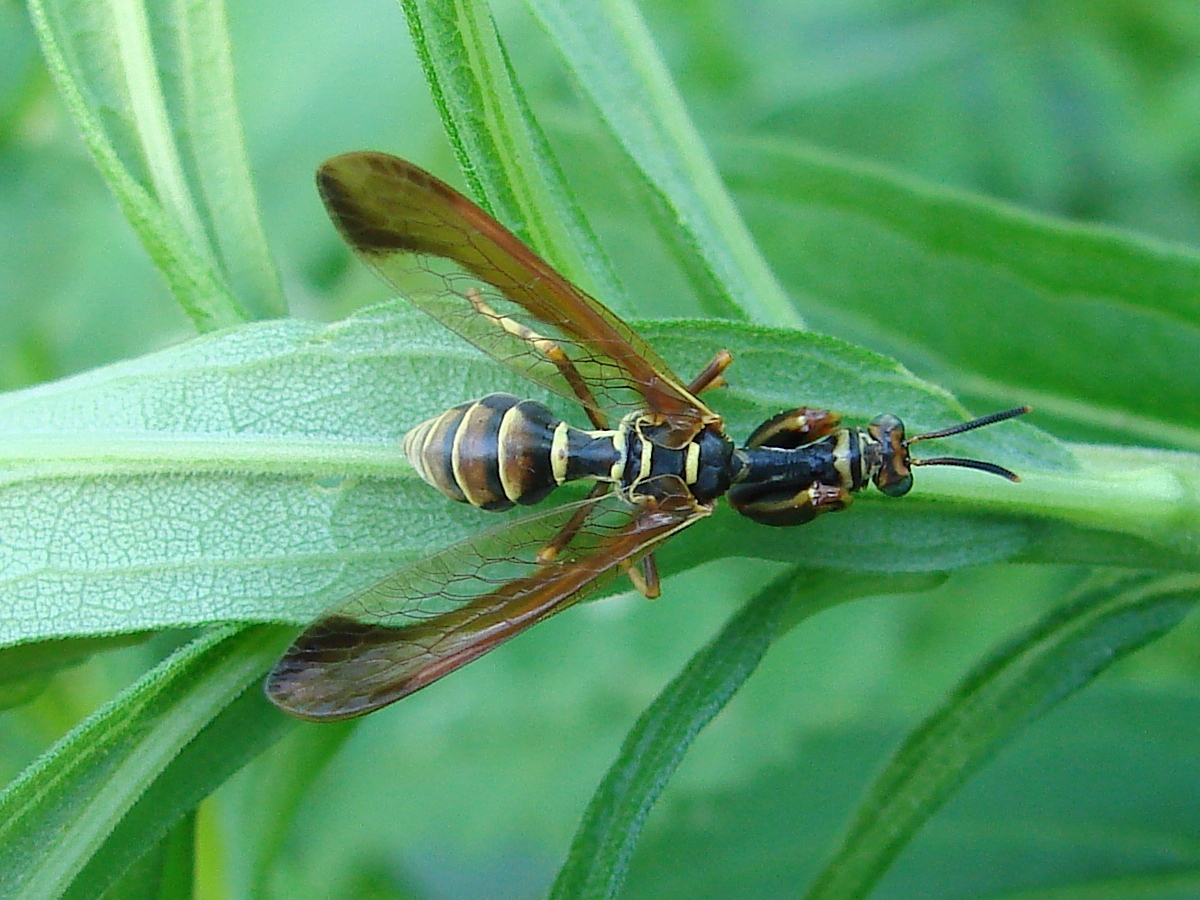

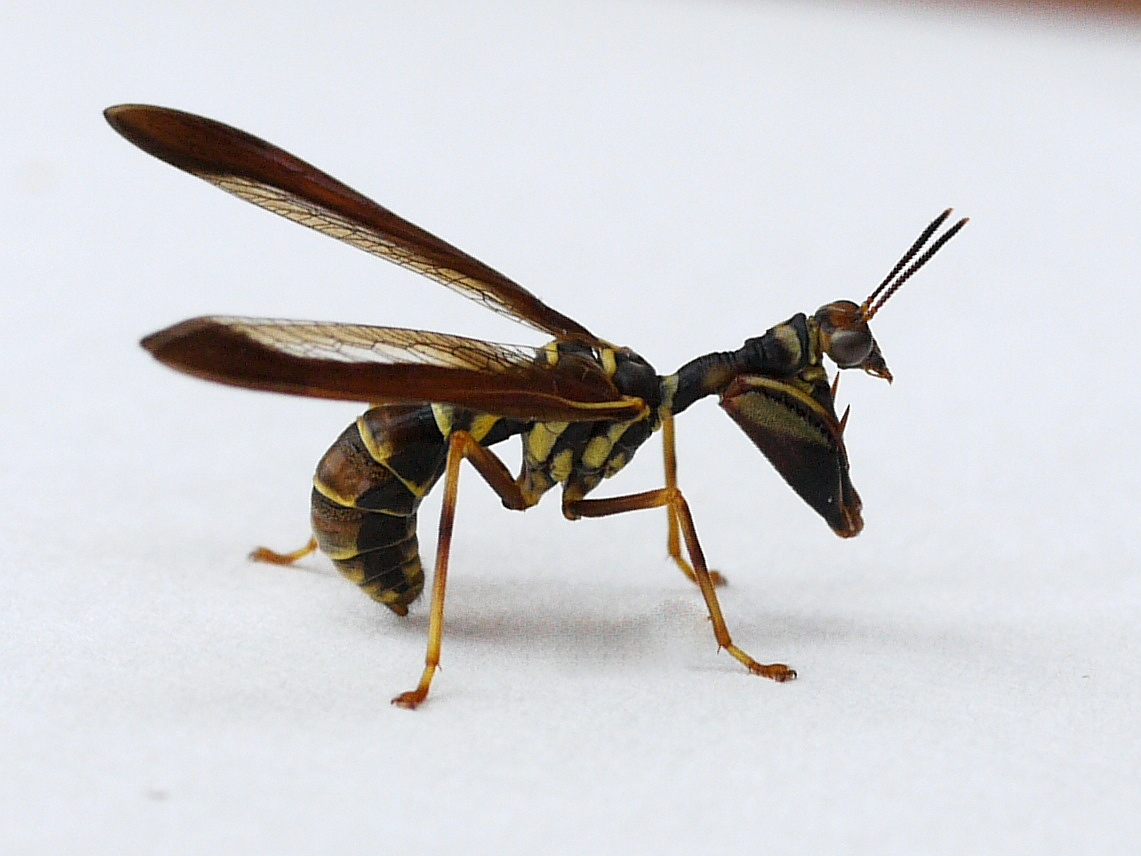

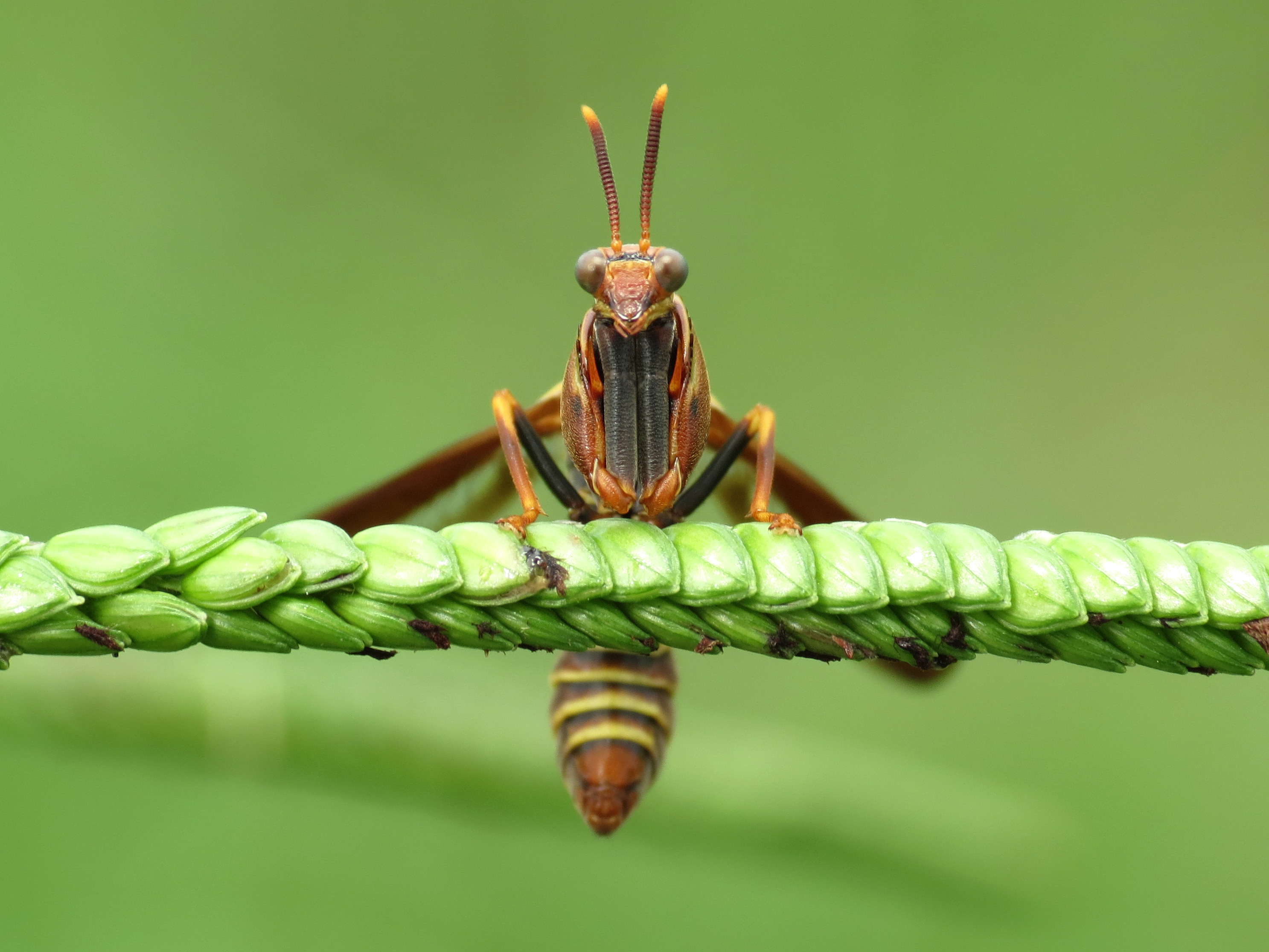
