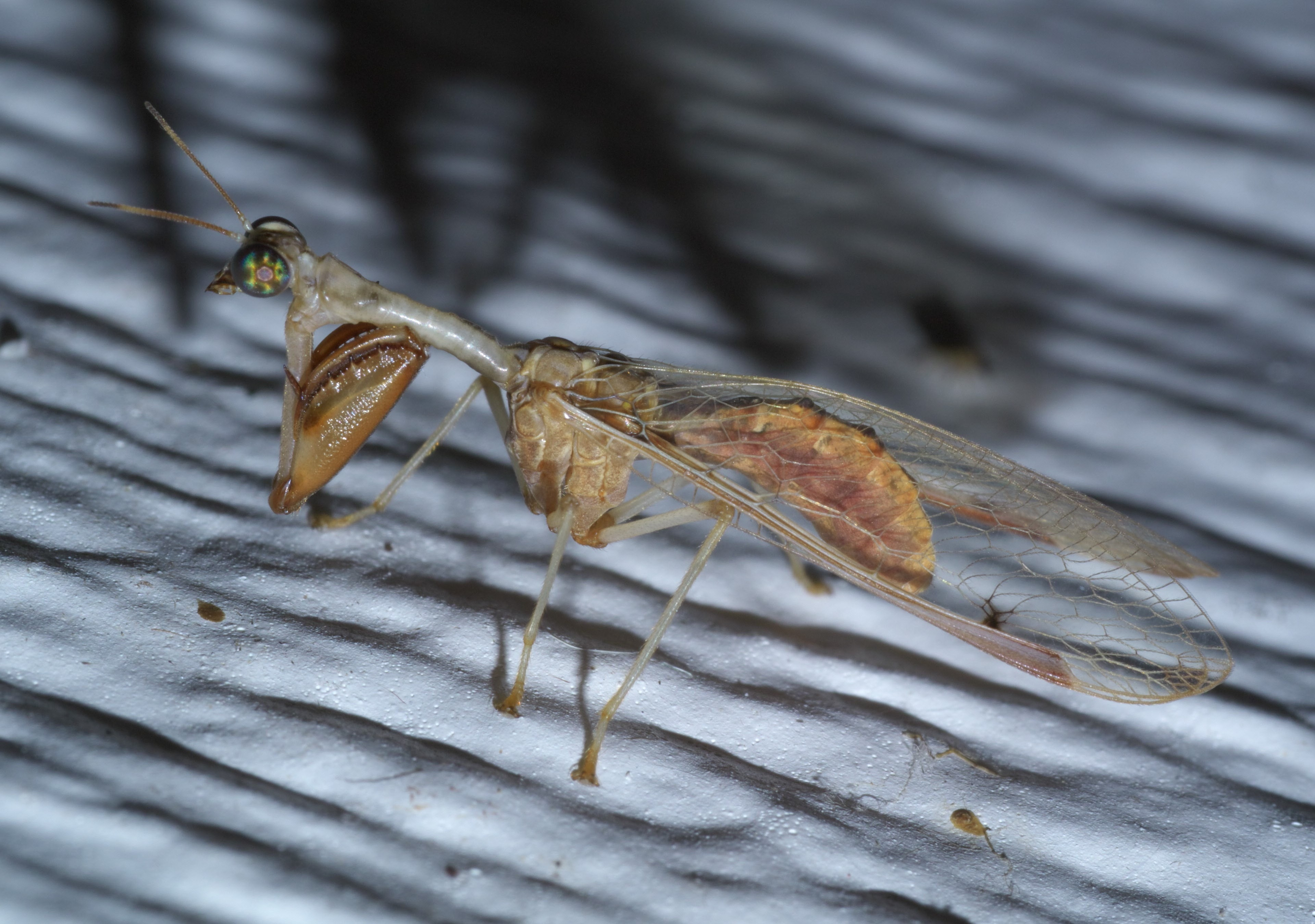

Scientific classification
- Domain: Eukaryota
- Kingdom: Animalia
- Phylum: Arthropoda
- Class: Insecta
- Order: Neuroptera
- Family: Mantispidae
- Genus: Dicromantispa
- Species: D. interrupta

Binomial name
- Dicromantispa interrupta (Say, 1825)

Synonyms
- Mantispa floridana Banks, 1897

= Dicromantispa interrupta =

Species of insect

Dicromantispa interrupta is a species of mantidfly in the family Mantispidae. It is found in Central America and North America. Larvae develop in the egg sacs of hunting spiders. Adults have spotted wings.
