= Clavifemora =

Clavifemora Temporal range: Bathonian

Scientific classification
- Kingdom: Animalia
- Phylum: Arthropoda
- Clade: Pancrustacea
- Class: Insecta
- Order: Neuroptera
- Family: Mantispidae
- Subfamily: †Mesomantispinae
- Genus: †Clavifemora
- Species: †C. rotundata

Binomial name
- †Clavifemora rotundata Jepson et al., 2013

Extinct genus of insects

Clavifemora is an extinct genus of mesomantispine mantispid that lived during the Bathonian stage of the Middle Jurassic epoch.

== Distribution ==
Clavifemora rotundata is known from the Jiulongshan Formation of Inner Mongolia.
