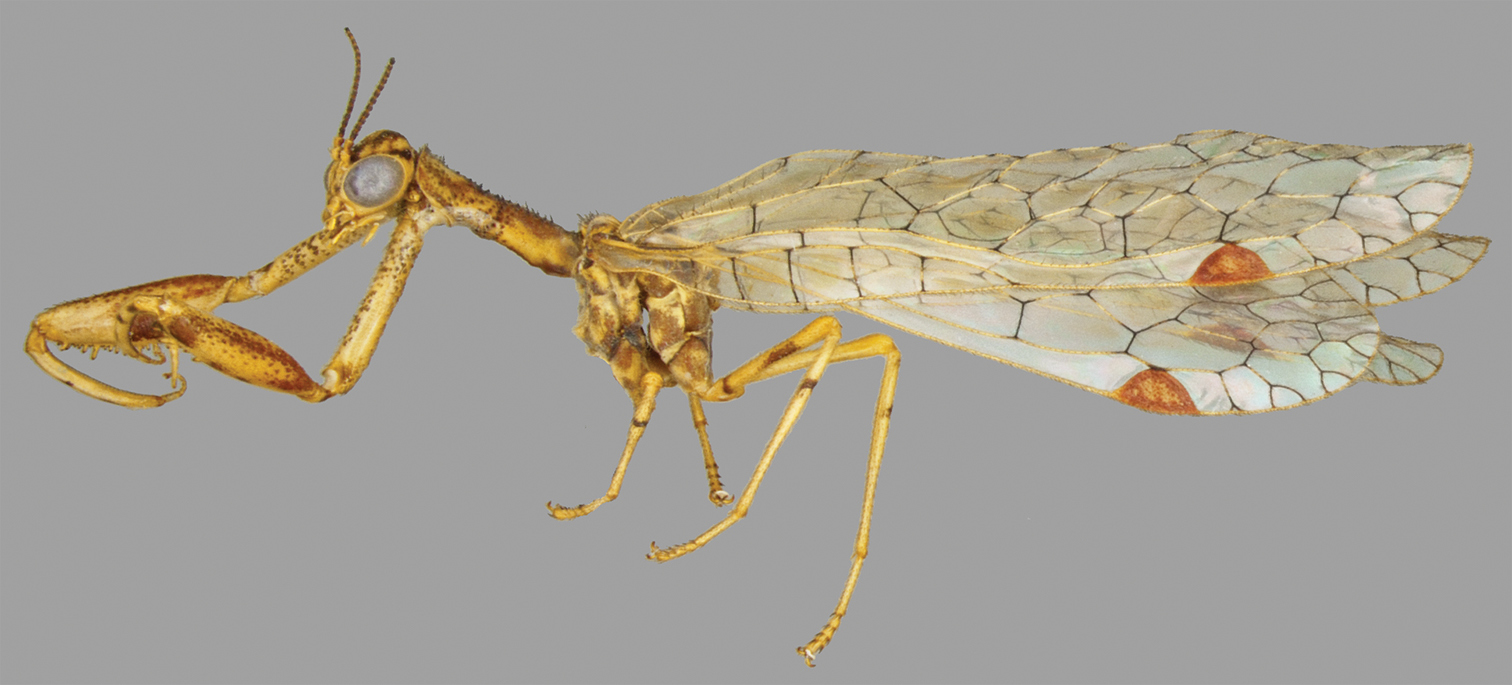
- Habitus of a male of Nolima victor (abdomen removed)

Scientific classification
- Kingdom: Animalia
- Phylum: Arthropoda
- Clade: Pancrustacea
- Class: Insecta
- Order: Neuroptera
- Family: Mantispidae
- Subfamily: Calomantispinae
- Genus: Nolima; Navas, 1914

Synonyms
- Bellarminus Navás, 1914

= Nolima =

Genus of insects

Nolima is a genus of mantidflies in the family Mantispidae. There are about seven described species in Nolima.

== Species ==
These seven species belong to the genus Nolima:

- Nolima dine Rehn, 1939
- Nolima infensa Navás, 1924
- Nolima kantsi Rehn, 1939
- Nolima pinal Rehn, 1939
- Nolima praeliator Navás, 1914
- Nolima pugnax (Navás, 1914)
- Nolima victor Navás, 1914
