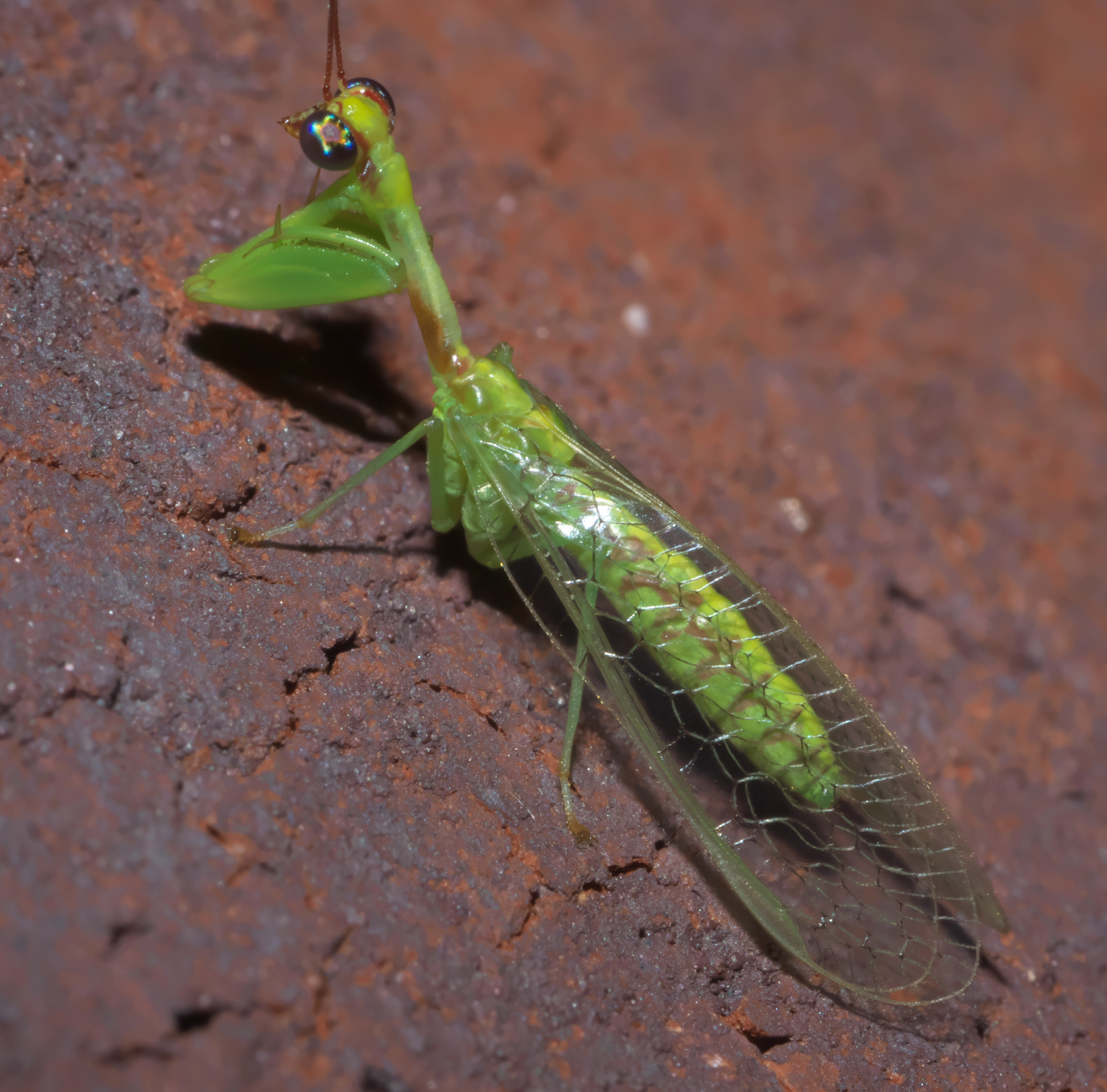

Scientific classification
- Kingdom: Animalia
- Phylum: Arthropoda
- Clade: Pancrustacea
- Class: Insecta
- Order: Neuroptera
- Family: Mantispidae
- Genus: Zeugomantispa
- Species: Z. minuta

Binomial name
- Zeugomantispa minuta (Fabricius, 1775)

Synonyms
- Mantispa femoralis Navás, 1914; Mantispa flavescens (Navás, 1914); Mantispa flavicornis (Navás, 1930); Mantispa flavomaculata Latreille, 1807; Mantispa pallescens Navás, 1914; Mantispa rubricata (Navás, 1924); Mantispa trichostigma (Navás, 1921); Mantispa viridata (Navás, 1924); Mantispa viridis Walker, 1853; Mantispa viridula (Houttuyn in Stoll, 1813)

= Zeugomantispa minuta =

Species of insect

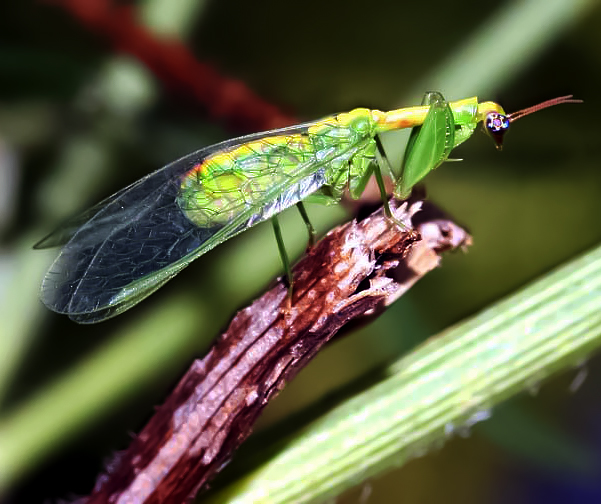
lateral view

Zeugomantispa minuta is a species of green mantidfly in the family Mantispidae. It is found in the Caribbean Sea, Central America, North America, and South America.

== Description ==
Like praying mantises, these insects use their forelegs to capture prey. These insects also have parasitoid larvae, which are deposited in spider egg sacs.
