= Xeromantispa =

Scientific classification
- Kingdom: Animalia
- Phylum: Arthropoda
- Clade: Pancrustacea
- Class: Insecta
- Order: Neuroptera
- Family: Mantispidae
- Genus: Xeromantispa; Hoffman in Penny, 2002
- Species: X. scabrosa

Binomial name
- Xeromantispa scabrosa (Banks, 1912)

Synonyms
- Mantispilla scabrosa Banks, 1912; Mantispa scabrosa (Banks, 1912)

Genus of insects

Xeromantispa is a genus of mantidflies in the family Mantispidae. There is one described species in Xeromantispa, X. scabrosa.
