= American Museum Novitates =

- Discipline: Zoology, paleontology, geology
- Language: English

Publication details
- History: 1921–present
- Publisher: American Museum of Natural History (United States)
- Frequency: Irregular
- Open access: Yes
- Impact factor: 1.727 (2021)

Standard abbreviations
- ISO 4: Am. Mus. Novit.

Indexing
- CODEN: AMUNAL
- ISSN: 0003-0082 (print); 1937-352X (web)
- LCCN: 85641736
- OCLC no.: 47720325

Links
- Journal homepage; Online access at BioOne

American Museum Novitates is a peer-reviewed academic journal published by the American Museum of Natural History. It was established in 1921. According to the Journal Citation Reports, the journal has a 2013 impact factor of 1.636.
