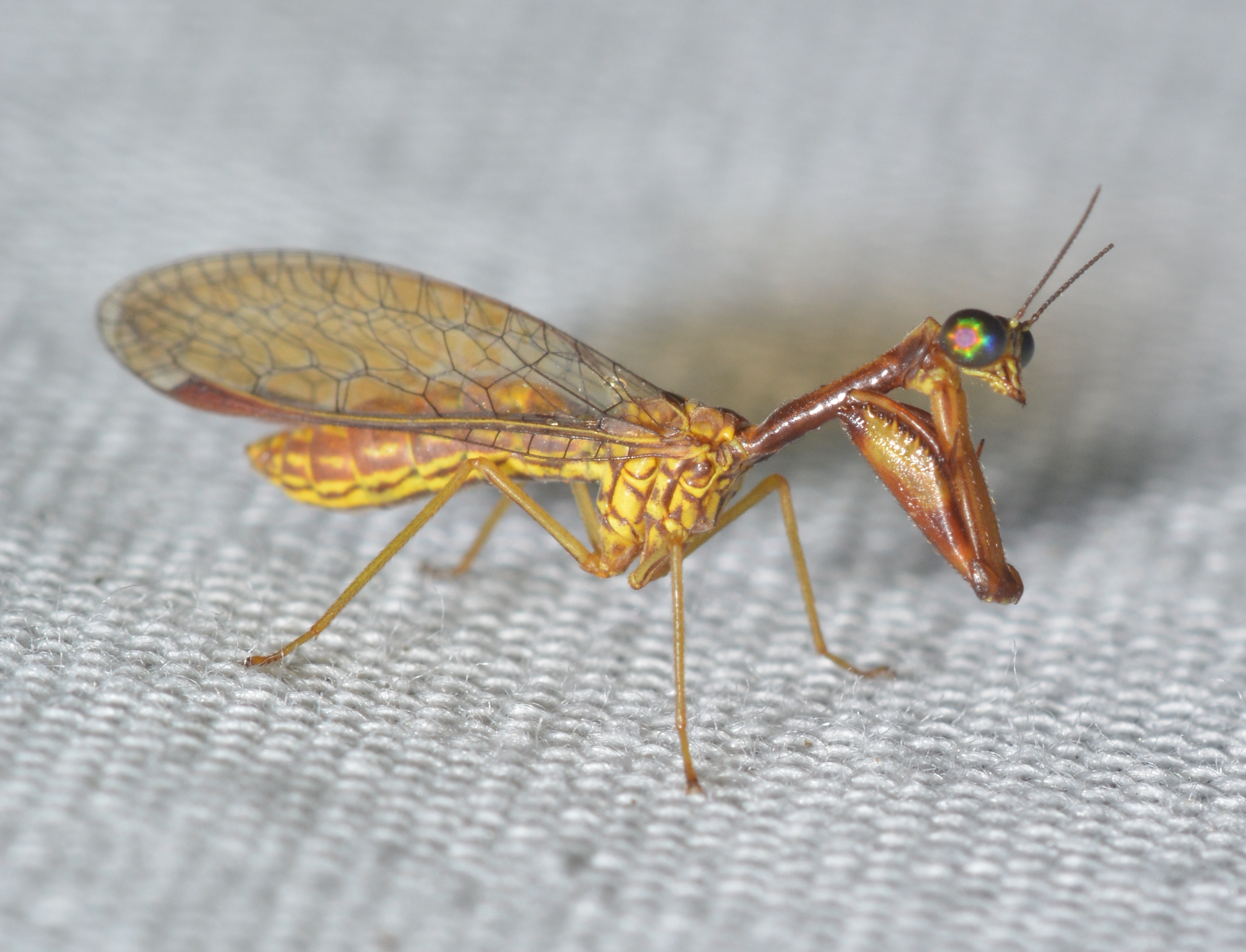
- Leptomantispa pulchella

Scientific classification
- Kingdom: Animalia
- Phylum: Arthropoda
- Clade: Pancrustacea
- Class: Insecta
- Order: Neuroptera
- Family: Mantispidae
- Subfamily: Mantispinae
- Genus: Leptomantispa; Hoffman in Penny, 2002

= Leptomantispa =

Genus of insects

Leptomantispa is a genus of mantidflies in the family Mantispidae. Described species of Leptomantispa are found in the Americas.

== Species ==
These seven species belong to the genus Leptomantispa:

- Leptomantispa ariasi (Penny, 1983)
- Leptomantispa axillaris (Navás, 1908)
- Leptomantispa catarinae Pires Machado & Rafael, 2007
- Leptomantispa chaos Hoffman in Penny, 2002
- Leptomantispa hoffmani Ardila-Camacho in Ardila-Camacho & García, 2015
- Leptomantispa nymphe Hoffman in Penny, 2002
- Leptomantispa pulchella (Banks, 1912)
