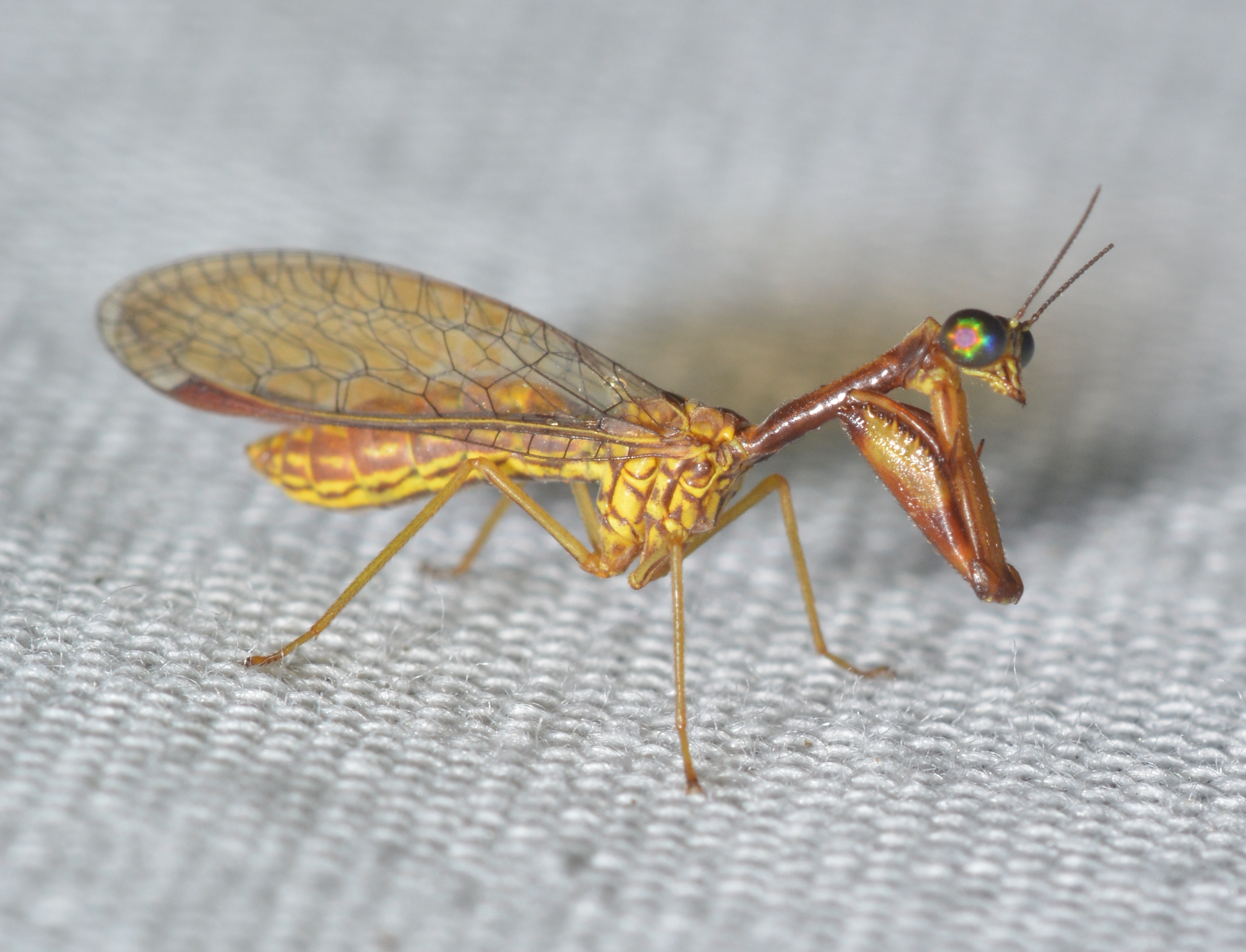

Scientific classification
- Domain: Eukaryota
- Kingdom: Animalia
- Phylum: Arthropoda
- Class: Insecta
- Order: Neuroptera
- Family: Mantispidae
- Genus: Leptomantispa
- Species: L. pulchella

Binomial name
- Leptomantispa pulchella (Banks, 1912)

= Leptomantispa pulchella =

Species of insect

Leptomantispa pulchella is a species of mantidfly in the family Mantispidae. It is found in the Caribbean Sea, Central America, and North America.
