= List of Tachinidae genera =

This is a list of the genera currently recognised in the fly family Tachinidae.

== A ==
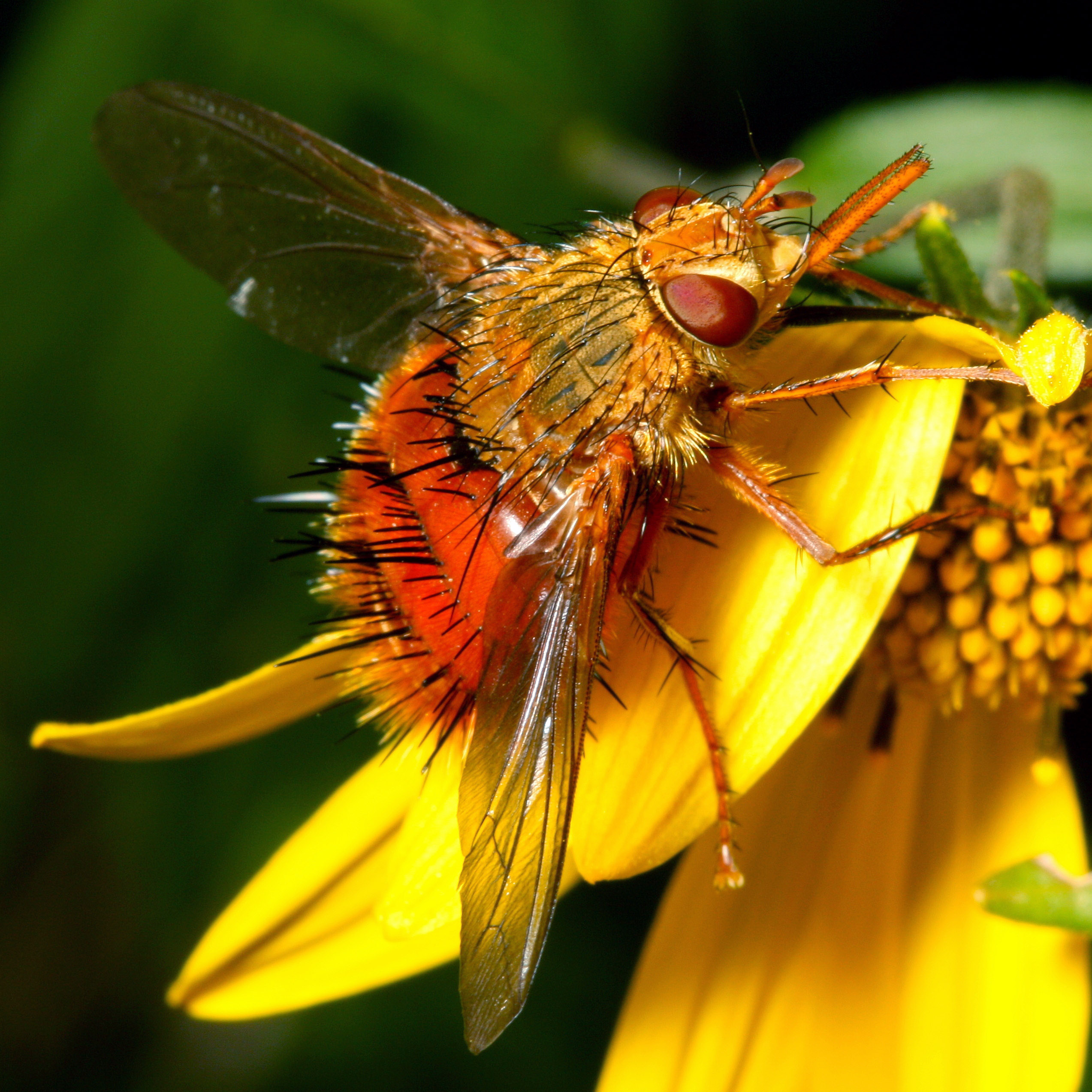
Adejeania vexatrix

- Abepalpus Townsend, 1931
- Acantholespesia Wood, 1987
- Acaulona van der Wulp, 1884
- Acemya Robineau-Desvoidy, 1830
- Acroceronia Cortés, 1951
- Acronacantha van der Wulp, 1891
- Actia Robineau-Desvoidy, 1830
- Actinochaeta Brauer & von Bergenstamm, 1889
- Actinochaetopteryx Townsend, 1927
- Actinodoria Townsend, 1927
- Actinominthella Townsend, 1928
- Actinoplagia Blanchard, 1940
- Acuphoceropsis Blanchard, 1943
- Adejeania Townsend, 1913
- Admontia Brauer & von Bergenstamm, 1889
- Aesia Richter, 2011
- Afrolixa Curran, 1939
- Afrophylax Cerretti & O’Hara in O’Hara & Cerretti, 2016
- Agaedioxenis Villeneuve, 1939
- Agicuphocera Townsend, 1915
- Aglummyia Townsend, 1912
- Aldrichiopa Guimarães, 1971
- Aldrichomyia Özdikmen, 2006
- Alexogloblinia Cortés, 1945
- Allelomyia González, 1992
- Allophorocera Hendel, 1901
- Alloprosopaea Villeneuve, 1923
- Allosturmia Blanchard, 1958
- Allothelaira Villeneuve, 1915
- Alpinoplagia Townsend, 1931
- Alsomyia Brauer & von Bergenstamm, 1891
- Alsopsyche Brauer & von Bergenstamm, 1891
- Altaia Malloch, 1938
- Amazohoughia Townsend, 1934
- Amblychaeta Aldrich, 1934
- Amelibaea Mesnil, 1955
- Amesiomima Mesnil, 1950
- Ametadoria Townsend, 1927
- Amicrotrichomma Townsend, 1927
- Amnonia Kugler, 1971
- Amphibolia Macquart, 1843
- Amphicestonia Villeneuve, 1939
- Amphitropesa Townsend, 1933
- Anacamptomyia Bischof, 1904
- Anadiscalia Curran, 1934
- Anadistichona Townsend, 1934
- Anaeudora Townsend, 1933
- Anagonia Brauer & von Bergenstamm, 1891
- Anamastax Brauer & von Bergenstamm, 1891
- Anametopochaeta Townsend, 1919
- Ancistrophora Schiner, 1865
- Andesimyia Brèthes, 1909
- Andinomyia Townsend, 1912
- Androsoma Cortés & Campos, 1971
- Anechuromyia Mesnil & Shima, 1979
- Anemorilla Townsend, 1915
- Aneogmena Brauer & von Bergenstamm, 1891
- Anepalpus Townsend, 1931
- Angustia Sellers, 1943
- Anisia van der Wulp, 1890
- Anomalostomyia Cerretti & Barraclough, 2007
- Anoxynops Townsend, 1927
- Anthomyiopsis Townsend, 1916
- Antistasea Bischof, 1904
- Antistaseopsis Townsend, 1934
- Anurophylla Villeneuve, 1938
- Apalpostoma Malloch, 1930
- Apatemyia Macquart, 1846
- Aphria Robineau-Desvoidy, 1830
- Aplomya Robineau-Desvoidy, 1830
- Aplomyodoria Townsend, 1928
- Aplomyopsis Townsend, 1927
- Apomorphomyia Crosskey, 1984
- Aporeomyia Pape & Shima, 1993
- Aprotheca Macquart, 1851
- Arama Richter, 1972
- Araucogonia Cortés, 1976
- Araucosimus Aldrich, 1934
- Archytas Jaennicke, 1867
- Archytoepalpus Townsend, 1927
- Arcona Richter, 1988
- Arctosoma Aldrich, 1934
- Argyrochaetona Townsend, 1919
- Argyromima Brauer & von Bergenstamm, 1889
- Argyrophylax Brauer & von Bergenstamm, 1889
- Argyrothelaira Townsend, 1916
- Aridalia Curran, 1934
- Arrhenomyza Malloch, 1929
- Arrhinactia Townsend, 1927
- Asetulia Malloch, 1938
- Asilidotachina Townsend, 1931
- Asseclamyia Reinhard, 1956
- Atacta Schiner, 1868
- Atactopsis Townsend, 1917
- Atactosturmia Townsend, 1915
- Ateloglossa Coquillett, 1899
- Ateloglutus Aldrich, 1934
- Athrycia Robineau-Desvoidy, 1830
- Atlantomyia Crosskey, 1977
- Atractocerops Townsend, 1916
- Atrichiopoda Townsend, 1931
- Atylomyia Brauer, 1898
- Atylostoma Brauer & von Bergenstamm, 1889
- Aulacephala Macquart, 1851
- Austeniops Townsend, 1915
- Australotachina Curran, 1938
- Austromacquartia Townsend, 1934
- Austronilea Crosskey, 1967
- Austrophasiopsis Townsend, 1933
- Austrophorocera Townsend, 1916
- Austrophryno Townsend, 1916
- Austrophytomyptera Blanchard, 1962
- Austrosolieria Cerretti & O’Hara in O’Hara & Cerretti, 2016
- Avibrissia Malloch, 1932
- Avibrissina Malloch, 1932
- Avibrissosturmia Townsend, 1927
- Azygobothria Townsend, 1911

== B ==
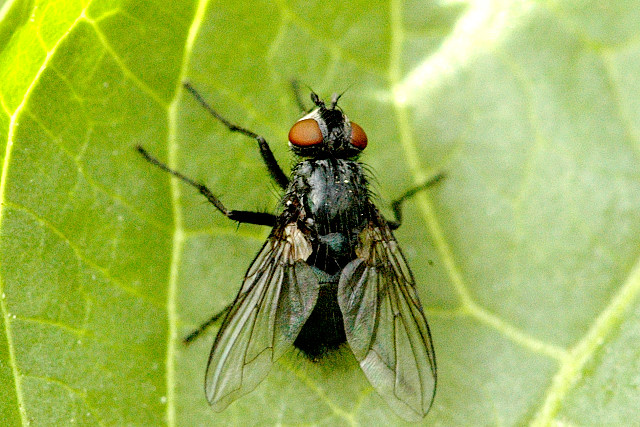
Blondelia nigripes

- Bactromyia Brauer & von Bergenstamm, 1891
- Bactromyiella Mesnil, 1952
- Bahrettinia Özdikmen, 2007
- Balde Rice, 2005
- Bampura Tschorsnig, 1983
- Barychaeta Bezzi, 1906
- Bathydexia van der Wulp, 1891
- Baumhaueria Meigen, 1838
- Belida Robineau-Desvoidy, 1863
- Bellina Robineau-Desvoidy, 1863
- Belvosia Robineau-Desvoidy, 1830
- Belvosiella Curran, 1934
- Belvosiomimops Townsend, 1935
- Beskia Brauer & von Bergenstamm, 1889
- Beskiocephala Townsend, 1916
- Beskioleskia Townsend, 1919
- Bessa Robineau-Desvoidy, 1863
- Besseria Robineau-Desvoidy, 1830
- Bezziomyiobia Baranov, 1938
- Bibiomima Brauer & von Bergenstamm, 1889
- Billaea Robineau-Desvoidy, 1830
- Binghamimyia Townsend, 1919
- Biomeigenia Mesnil, 1961
- Bischofimyia Townsend, 1927
- Bithia Robineau-Desvoidy, 1863
- Blepharella Macquart, 1851
- Blepharellina Mesnil, 1952
- Blephariatacta Townsend, 1931
- Blepharipa Rondani, 1856
- Blepharomyia Brauer & von Bergenstamm, 1889
- Blepharopoda Rondani, 1850
- Blondelia Robineau-Desvoidy, 1830
- Bogosia Rondani, 1873
- Bolbocheta Bigot, 1885
- Bolohoughia Townsend, 1927
- Bombyliomyia Brauer & von Bergenstamm, 1889
- Borgmeiermyia Townsend, 1935
- Bothria Rondani, 1856
- Bothrophora Schiner, 1868
- Botriopsis Townsend, 1928
- Bourquinia Blanchard, 1935
- Brachelia Robineau-Desvoidy, 1830
- Bracheliopsis van Emden, 1960
- Brachybelvosia Townsend, 1927
- Brachychaeta Rondani, 1861
- Brachychaetoides Mesnil, 1970
- Brachycnephalia Townsend, 1927
- Brachymasicera Townsend, 1911
- Brachymera Brauer & von Bergenstamm, 1889
- Bracteola Richter, 1972
- Brasilomyia Özdikmen, 2010
- Brullaea Robineau-Desvoidy, 1863
- Buquetia Robineau-Desvoidy, 1847

== C ==
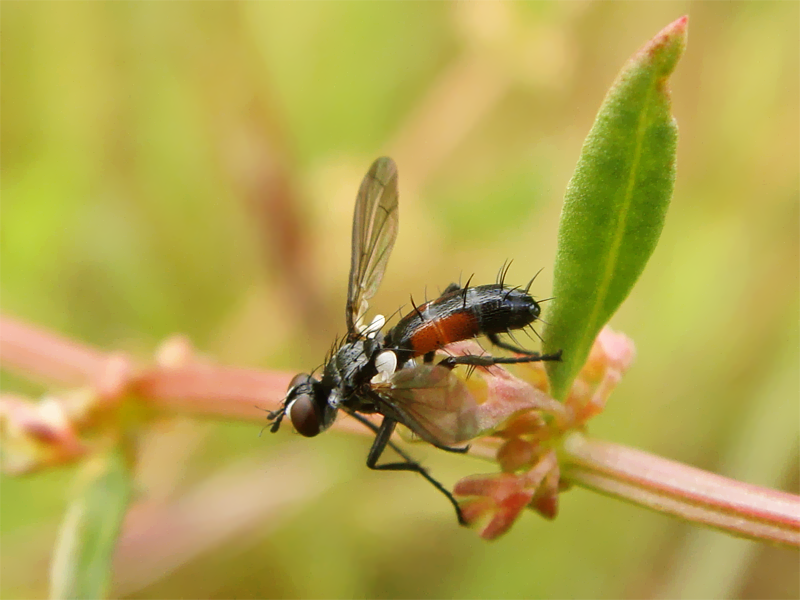
Cylindromyia brassicaria

- Cadurcia Villeneuve, 1926
- Cadurciella Villeneuve, 1927
- Caeniopsis Townsend, 1927
- Caenisomopsis Townsend, 1934
- Cahenia Verbeke, 1960
- Calcager Hutton, 1901
- Calcageria Curran, 1927
- Calliethilla Shima, 1979
- Callotroxis Aldrich, 1929
- Calocarcelia Townsend, 1927
- Calodexia van der Wulp, 1891
- Calohystricia Townsend, 1931
- Calolydella Townsend, 1927
- Calosia Malloch, 1938
- Calotachina Malloch, 1938
- Calozenillia Townsend, 1927
- Caltagironea Cortés & Campos, 1974
- Calyptromyia Villeneuve, 1915
- Camarona van der Wulp, 1891
- Camposiana Townsend, 1915
- Camposodes Cortés, 1967
- Camptophryno Townsend, 1927
- Campylia Malloch, 1938
- Campylocheta Rondani, 1859
- Cantrellius Barraclough, 1992
- Carbonilla Mesnil, 1974
- Carcelia Robineau-Desvoidy, 1830
- Carceliathrix Cerretti & O’Hara in O’Hara & Cerretti, 2016
- Carceliella Baranov, 1934
- Carcelimyia Mesnil, 1944
- Carcelina Mesnil, 1944
- Carceliocephala Townsend, 1934
- Carceliodoria Townsend, 1928
- Carmodymyia Thompson, 1968
- Casahuiria Townsend, 1919
- Catagonia Brauer & von Bergenstamm, 1891
- Catajurinia Townsend, 1927
- Catapariprosopa Townsend, 1927
- Catena Richter, 1975
- Catharosia Rondani, 1868
- Cavalieria Villeneuve, 1908
- Cavillatrix Richter, 1986
- Celatoria Coquillett, 1890
- Ceracia Rondani, 1865
- Ceratochaetops Mesnil, 1970
- Ceratometopa Townsend, 1931
- Ceromasia Rondani, 1856
- Ceromasiopsis Townsend, 1927
- Ceromya Robineau-Desvoidy, 1830
- Cerotachina Arnaud, 1963
- Cesaperua Koçak & Kemal, 2010
- Cestonia Rondani, 1861
- Cestonionerva Villeneuve, 1929
- Cestonioptera Villeneuve, 1939
- Chaetexorista Brauer & von Bergenstamm, 1895
- Chaetocalirrhoe Townsend, 1935
- Chaetocnephalia Townsend, 1915
- Chaetocrania Townsend, 1915
- Chaetocraniopsis Townsend, 1915
- Chaetodemoticus Brauer & von Bergenstamm, 1891
- Chaetodexia Mesnil, 1976
- Chaetodoria Townsend, 1927
- Chaetoepalpus Vimmer & Soukup, 1940
- Chaetogaedia Brauer & von Bergenstamm, 1891
- Chaetoglossa Townsend, 1892
- Chaetogyne Brauer & von Bergenstamm, 1889
- Chaetolixophaga Blanchard, 1940
- Chaetona van der Wulp, 1891
- Chaetonodexodes Townsend, 1916
- Chaetonopsis Townsend, 1915
- Chaetophorocera Townsend. 1912
- Chaetophthalmus Brauer & von Bergenstamm, 1891
- Chaetoplagia Coquillett, 1895
- Chaetopletha Malloch, 1938
- Chaetoria Becker, 1908
- Chaetosisyrops Townsend, 1912
- Chaetostigmoptera Townsend, 1916
- Chaetosturmia Villeneuve, 1915
- Chaetotheresia Townsend. 1931
- Chaetovoria Villeneuve, 1920
- Chaetoxynops Townsend, 1928
- Charapozelia Townsend, 1927
- Charitella Mesnil, 1957
- Chesippus Reinhard, 1967
- Chetina Rondani, 1856
- Chetogaster Macquart, 1851
- Chetogena Rondani, 1856
- Chetoptilia Rondani, 1862
- Chiloclista Townsend, 1931
- Chiloepalpus Townsend, 1927
- Chiricahuia Townsend, 1918
- Chlorogastropsis Townsend, 1926
- Chlorohystricia Townsend, 1927
- Chlorolydella Townsend, 1933
- Chloropales Mesnil, 1950
- Chlorotachina Townsend, 1915
- Choeteprosopa Macquart, 1851
- Cholomyia Bigot, 1884
- Chromatocera Townsend, 1915
- Chromatophania Brauer & von Bergenstamm, 1889
- Chromoepalpus Townsend, 1914
- Chryserycia Mesnil, 1977
- Chrysoexorista Townsend, 1915
- Chrysohoughia Townsend, 1935
- Chrysometopiops Townsend, 1916
- Chrysomikia Mesnil, 1970
- Chrysopasta Brauer & von Bergenstamm, 1889
- Chrysophryno Townsend, 1927
- Chrysophryxe Sellers, 1943
- Chrysosomopsis Townsend, 1916
- Chrysosturmia Townsend, 1916
- Chrysotachina Brauer & von Bergenstamm, 1889
- Chrysotryphera Townsend, 1935
- Chyuluella van Emden, 1960
- Ciala Richter, 1976
- Cinochira Zetterstedt, 1845
- Cistogaster Latreille, 1829
- Clairvillia Robineau-Desvoidy, 1830
- Clastoneura Aldrich, 1934
- Clastoneuriopsis Reinhard, 1939
- Clausicella Rondani, 1856
- Clelimyia Herting, 1981
- Clemelis Robineau-Desvoidy, 1863
- Cleonice Robineau-Desvoidy, 1863
- Clinogaster van der Wulp, 1892
- Clytiomya Rondani, 1861
- Cnephalodes Townsend, 1911
- Cnephaotachina Brauer & von Bergenstamm, 1895
- Cockerelliana Townsend, 1915
- Cololeskia Villeneuve, 1939
- Coloradomyia Arnaud, 1963
- Comatacta Coquillett, 1902
- Comops Aldrich, 1934
- Comopsis Cortés, 1986
- Compsilura Bouché, 1834
- Compsiluroides Mesnil, 1953
- Compsoptesis Villeneuve, 1915
- Comyops van der Wulp, 1891
- Comyopsis Townsend, 1919
- Conactia Townsend, 1927
- Conactiodoria Townsend, 1934
- Conogaster Brauer & von Bergenstamm, 1891
- Conopomima Mesnil, 1978
- Copecrypta Townsend, 1908
- Coracomyia Aldrich, 1934
- Cordillerodexia Townsend, 1927
- Cordyligaster Macquart, 1844
- Corpulentoepalpus Townsend, 1927
- Corpulentosoma Townsend, 1914
- Corybantia Richter, 1986
- Coscaronia Cortés, 1979
- Cossidophaga Baranov, 1934
- Cowania Reinhard, 1952
- Crapivnicia Richter, 1995
- Crassicornia Kugler, 1980
- Crocinosoma Reinhard, 1947
- Croesoactia Townsend, 1927
- Crosskeya Shima & Chao, 1988
- Cryptocladocera Bezzi, 1923
- Cryptomeigenia Brauer & von Bergenstamm, 1891
- Cryptopalpus Rondani, 1850
- Ctenophorinia Mesnil, 1963
- Cubaemyiopsis Thompson, 1963
- Cucuba Richter, 2008
- Cuparymyia Townsend, 1934
- Currana Özdikmen, 2007
- Cyanogymnomma Townsend, 1927
- Cyanoleskia Mesnil, 1978
- Cyanopsis Townsend, 1917
- Cylindromasicera Townsend, 1915
- Cylindromyia Meigen, 1803
- Cylindrophasia Townsend, 1916
- Cyosoprocta Reinhard, 1952
- Cyrtocladia van Emden, 1947
- Cyrtophloeba Rondani, 1856
- Cyzenis Robineau-Desvoidy, 1863

== D ==
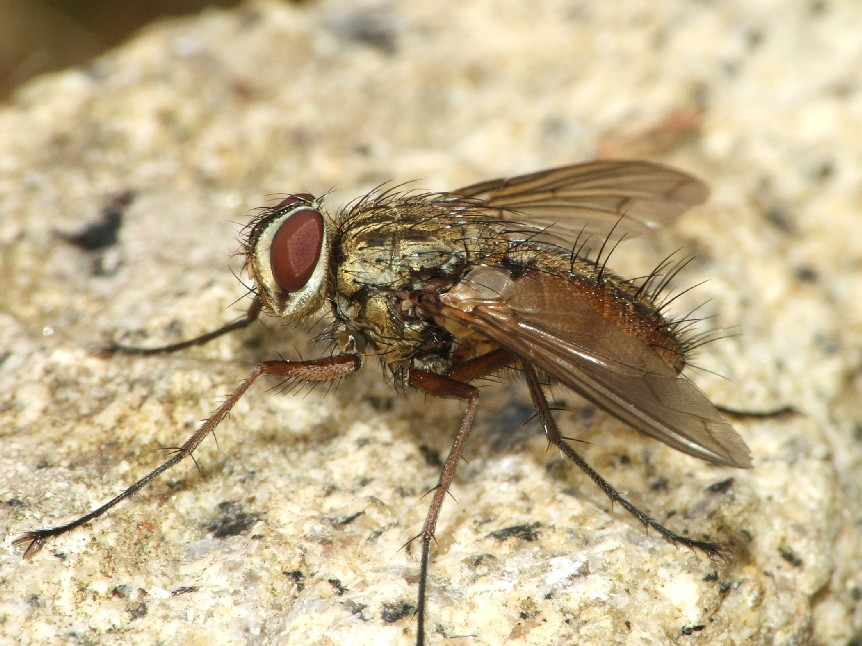
Dexia rustica

- Daetaleus Aldrich, 1928
- Dallasimyia Blanchard, 1944
- Dasyuromyia Bigot, 1885
- Datvia Richter, 1972
- Degeeriopsis Mesnil, 1953
- Dejeania Robineau-Desvoidy, 1830
- Dejeaniops Townsend, 1913
- Deloblepharis Aldrich, 1934
- Deltoceromyia Townsend, 1931
- Deltomyza Malloch, 1931
- Demoticoides Mesnil, 1953
- Demoticus Macquart, 1854
- Deopalpus Townsend, 1908
- Desantisodes Cortés, 1973
- Descampsina Mesnil, 1956
- Dexia Meigen, 1826
- Dexiomera Curran, 1933
- Dexiomimops Townsend, 1926
- Dexiosoma Rondani, 1856
- Dexodomintho Townsend, 1935
- Diaphanomyia Townsend, 1917
- Diaphoropeza Townsend, 1908
- Diaprochaeta Mesnil, 1970
- Diaugia Perty, 1833
- Dicarca Richter, 1993
- Dichocera Williston, 1895
- Diglossocera van der Wulp, 1895
- Dinera Robineau-Desvoidy, 1830
- Dionaea Robineau-Desvoidy, 1830
- Dionomelia Kugler, 1978
- Diotrephes Reinhard, 1964
- Diplopota Bezzi, 1918
- Dischotrichia Cortés, 1944
- Distichona van der Wulp, 1890
- Doleschalla Walker, 1861
- Dolichocnephalia Townsend, 1915
- Dolichocodia Townsend, 1908
- Dolichocolon Brauer & von Bergenstamm, 1889
- Dolichocoxys Townsend, 1927
- Dolichodinera Townsend, 1935
- Dolichogonia Townsend, 1915
- Dolichopalpellus Townsend, 1927
- Dolichopodomintho Townsend, 1927
- Dolichostoma Townsend, 1912
- Dolichotarsina Mesnil, 1977
- Dolichotarsus Brooks, 1945
- Doliolomyia Reinhard, 1974
- Doriella Townsend, 1931
- Drepanoglossa Townsend, 1891
- Drino Robineau-Desvoidy, 1863
- Drinomyia Mesnil, 1962
- Dufouria Robineau-Desvoidy, 1830
- Dumerillia Robineau-Desvoidy, 1830

== E ==
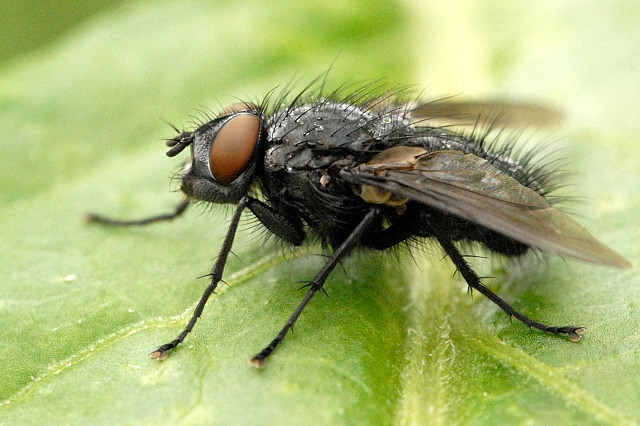
Epicampocera succincta

- Ebenia Macquart, 1846
- Echinodexia Brauer & von Bergenstamm, 1893
- Echinopyrrhosia Townsend, 1914
- Echinopyrrhosiops Townsend, 1931
- Ectophasia Townsend, 1912
- Ectophasiopsis Townsend, 1915
- Ecuadorana Townsend, 1912
- Edwynia Aldrich, 1930
- Effusimentum Barraclough, 1992
- Egameigenia Townsend, 1927
- Eggonia Brauer & von Bergenstamm, 1893
- Eleodiphaga Walton, 1918
- Eleuthromyia Reinhard, 1964
- Elfriedella Mesnil, 1957
- Eliozeta Rondani, 1856
- Eloceria Robineau-Desvoidy, 1863
- Elodia Robineau-Desvoidy, 1863
- Elodimyia Mesnil, 1952
- Elomya Robineau-Desvoidy, 1830
- Empheremyia Bischof, 1904
- Empheremyiops Townsend, 1927
- Emporomyia Brauer & von Bergenstamm, 1891
- Enchomyia Aldrich, 1934
- Engeddia Kugler, 1977
- Enrogalia Reinhard, 1964
- Entomophaga Lioy, 1864
- Eoacemyia Townsend, 1926
- Eomedina Mesnil, 1960
- Eomeigenielloides Reinhard, 1974
- Eophyllophila Townsend, 1926
- Eozenillia Townsend, 1926
- Epalpellus Townsend, 1914
- Epalpodes Townsend, 1912
- Epalpus Rondani, 1850
- Epicampocera Macquart, 1849
- Epicoronimyia Blanchard, 1940
- Epicuphocera Townsend, 1927
- Epigrimyia Townsend, 1891
- Epiphanocera Townsend, 1915
- Epiplagiops Blanchard, 1943
- Erebiomima Mesnil, 1953
- Ergolabus Reinhard, 1964
- Eribella Mesnil, 1960
- Eriothrix Meigen, 1803
- Eristaliomyia Townsend, 1926
- Ernestiopsis Townsend, 1931
- Erviopsis Townsend, 1934
- Erycesta Herting, 1967
- Erycia Robineau-Desvoidy, 1830
- Erynnia Robineau-Desvoidy, 1830
- Erynniola Mesnil, 1977
- Erynniopsis Townsend, 1926
- Erythroargyrops Townsend, 1917
- Erythrocera Robineau-Desvoidy, 1849
- Erythroepalpus Townsend, 1931
- Erythromelana Townsend, 1919
- Erythronychia Brauer & von Bergenstamm, 1891
- Estheria Robineau-Desvoidy, 1830
- Ethilla Robineau-Desvoidy, 1863
- Ethylloides Verbeke, 1970
- Etroga Richter, 1995
- Euacaulona Townsend, 1908
- Euanisia Blanchard, 1947
- Euantha van der Wulp, 1885
- Euanthoides Townsend, 1931
- Eubischofimyia Townsend, 1927
- Eucelatoria Townsend, 1909
- Euceromasia Townsend, 1912
- Euchaetogyne Townsend, 1908
- Eucheirophaga James, 1945
- Euclytia Townsend, 1908
- Eucnephalia Townsend, 1892
- Eucoronimyia Townsend, 1908
- Eucorpulentosoma Townsend, 1914
- Eudejeania Townsend, 1912
- Eudexia Brauer & von Bergenstamm, 1889
- Euempheremyia Townsend, 1927
- Euepalpodes Townsend, 1915
- Euepalpus Townsend, 1908
- Euexorista Townsend, 1912
- Eugenia Robineau-Desvoidy, 1863
- Eufabriciopsis Townsend, 1915
- Eugaediopsis Townsend, 1916
- Eugymnopeza Townsend, 1933
- Euhalidaya Walton, 1914
- Euhuascaraya Townsend, 1927
- Euhygia Mesnil, 1960
- Euhystricia Townsend, 1914
- Eujuriniodes Townsend, 1935
- Eulabidogaster Belanovsky, 1951
- Eulasiona Townsend, 1892
- Eulasiopalpus Townsend, 1913
- Eulobomyia Woodley & Arnaud, 2008
- Euloewiodoria Townsend, 1927
- Euloewiopsis Townsend, 1917
- Eumachaeraea Townsend, 1927
- Eumacrohoughia Townsend, 1927
- Eumea Robineau-Desvoidy, 1863
- Eumeella Mesnil, 1939
- Eumegaparia Townsend, 1908
- Eumelanepalpus Townsend, 1915
- Eunemorilla Townsend, 1919
- Euoestrophasia Townsend, 1892
- Euoestropsis Townsend, 1913
- Eupododexia Villeneuve, 1915
- Euptilomyia Townsend, 1939
- Euptilopareia Townsend, 1916
- Eurithia Robineau-Desvoidy, 1844
- Eurygastropsis Townsend, 1916
- Eurysthaea Robineau-Desvoidy, 1863
- Eurythemyia Reinhard, 1967
- Eusaundersiops Townsend, 1915
- Euscopolia Townsend, 1892
- Euscopoliopteryx Townsend, 1917
- Eustacomyia Malloch, 1927
- Eutelothyria Townsend, 1931
- Euthelaira Townsend, 1912
- Euthelyconychia Townsend, 1927
- Euthera Loew, 1866
- Euthyprosopiella Blanchard, 1963
- Eutrichophora Townsend, 1915
- Eutrichopoda Townsend, 1908
- Eutrichopodopsis Blanchard, 1966
- Eutrixa Coquillett, 1897
- Eutrixoides Walton, 1913
- Eutrixopsis Townsend, 1919
- Euvespivora Baranov, 1942
- Euwinthemia Blanchard, 1963
- Everestiomyia Townsend, 1933
- Evidomyia Reinhard, 1958
- Exechopalpus Macquart, 1847
- Exodexia Townsend, 1927
- Exoernestia Townsend, 1927
- Exopalpus Macquart, 1851
- Exorista Meigen, 1803
- Exoristoides Coquillett, 1897

== F ==
- Fabriciopsis Townsend, 1914
- Fasslomyia Townsend, 1931
- Fausta Robineau-Desvoidy, 1830
- Feriola Mesnil, 1957
- Filistea Cerretti & O’Hara in O’Hara & Cerretti, 2016
- Fischeria Robineau-Desvoidy, 1830
- Flavicorniculum Chao & Shi, 1981
- Floradalia Thompson, 1963
- Formicomyia Townsend, 1916
- Formicophania Townsend, 1916
- Formodexia Crosskey, 1973
- Formosia Guérin-Ménevillele, 1843
- Freraea Robineau-Desvoidy, 1830
- Froggattimyia Townsend, 1916
- Frontina Meigen, 1838
- Frontiniella Townsend, 1918
- Frontocnephalia Townsend, 1916
- Frontodexia Mesnil, 1976

== G ==
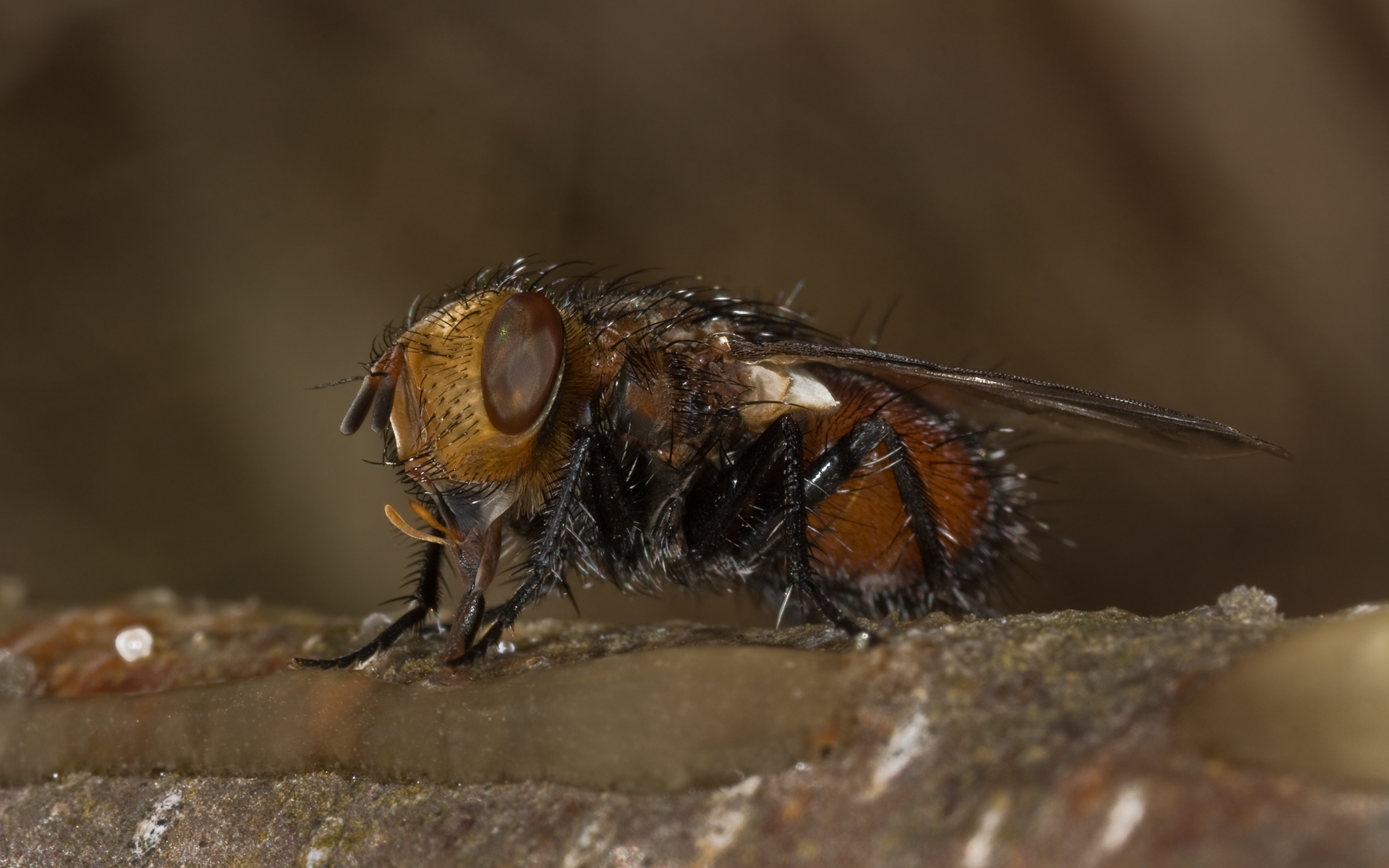
Gonia capitata

- Gaedia Meigen, 1838
- Gaediophanopsis Blanchard, 1954
- Gaediopsis Brauer & von Bergenstamm, 1891
- Galapagosia Curran, 1934
- Galsania Richter, 1993
- Ganopleuron Aldrich, 1934
- Ganoproctus Aldrich, 1934
- Gastrolepta Rondani, 1862
- Gastroptilops Mesnil, 1957
- Gemursa Barraclough, 1992
- Genea Rondani, 1850
- Geneodes Townsend, 1934
- Genotrichia Malloch, 1938
- Geraldia Malloch, 1930
- Germaria Robineau-Desvoidy, 1830
- Germariochaeta Villeneuve, 1937
- Germariopsis Townsend, 1915
- Gerocyptera Townsend, 1916
- Gigamyiopsis Reinhard, 1964
- Gigantoepalpus Townsend, 1913
- Ginglymia Townsend, 1892
- Glaurocara Thomson, 1869
- Glossidionophora Bigot, 1885
- Gnadochaeta Macquart, 1851
- Gonatorrhina Röder, 1886
- Gonia Meigen, 1803
- Goniocera Brauer & von Bergenstamm, 1891
- Goniochaeta Townsend, 1891
- Goniophthalmus Villeneuve, 1910
- Gonistylum Macquart, 1851
- Gonzalezodoria Cortés, 1967
- Gracilicera Miller, 1945
- Graphia van der Wulp, 1885
- Graphogaster Rondani, 1868
- Graphotachina Malloch, 1938
- Gueriniopsis Reinhard, 1943
- Gymnochaetopsis Townsend, 1914
- Gymnocheta Robineau-Desvoidy, 1830
- Gymnoclytia Brauer & von Bergenstamm, 1893
- Gymnoglossa Mik, 1898
- Gymnomacquartia Mesnil & Shima, 1978
- Gymnomma van der Wulp, 1888
- Gymnommopsis Townsend, 1927
- Gymnophryxe Villeneuve, 1922
- Gymnosoma Meigen, 1803
- Gynandromyia Bezzi, 1923

== H ==
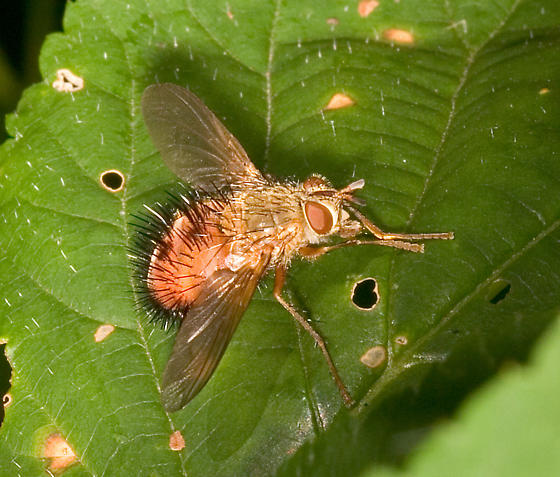
Hystricia abrupta

- Halidaia Egger, 1856
- Hamaxia Walker, 1860
- Hamaxiella Mesnil, 1967
- Hapalioloemus Baranov, 1934
- Haracca Richter, 1995
- Harrisia Robineau-Desvoidy, 1830
- Hasmica Richter, 1972
- Haywardiamyia Blanchard, 1955
- Hebia Robineau-Desvoidy, 1830
- Hegesinus Reinhard, 1964
- Heliaea Curran, 1934
- Heliconiophaga Thompson, 1966
- Heliodorus Reinhard, 1964
- Helioprosopa Townsend, 1927
- Hemimacquartia Brauer & von Bergenstamm, 1893
- Hemisturmia Townsend, 1927
- Hemisturmiella Guimarães, 1983
- Hemyda Robineau-Desvoidy, 1830
- Heraultia Villeneuve, 1920
- Hermya Robineau-Desvoidy, 1830
- Hesperomyia Brauer & von Bergenstamm, 1889
- Heteria Malloch, 1930
- Heterometopia Macquart, 1846
- Hillomyia Crosskey, 1973
- Hineomyia Townsend, 1916
- Homalactia Townsend, 1915
- Homogenia van der Wulp, 1892
- Homohypochaeta Townsend, 1927
- Homosaundersia Townsend, 1931
- Homosaundersiops Townsend, 1931
- Homotrixa Villeneuve, 1914
- Houghia Coquillett, 1897
- Huascarayopsis Townsend, 1927
- Huascarodexia Townsend, 1919
- Hubneria Robineau-Desvoidy, 1848
- Huttonobesseria Curran, 1927
- Hyadesimyia Bigot, 1888
- Hyalurgus Brauer & von Bergenstamm, 1893
- Hygiella Mesnil, 1957
- Hyleorus Aldrich, 1926
- Hyosoma Aldrich, 1934
- Hyperaea Robineau-Desvoidy, 1863
- Hypersara Villeneuve, 1935
- Hypertrophocera Townsend, 1891
- Hypertrophomma Townsend, 1915
- Hyphantrophaga Townsend, 1892
- Hypochaetopsis Townsend, 1915
- Hypodoria Townsend, 1927
- Hypohoughia Townsend, 1927
- Hypoproxynops Townsend, 1927
- Hypovoria Villeneuve, 1912
- Hystricephala Macquart, 1846
- Hystrichodexia Röder, 1886
- Hystricia Macquart, 1844
- Hystricovoria Townsend, 1928
- Hystriomyia Portschinsky, 1881
- Hystrysyphona Bigot, 1859

== I ==
- Icelia Robineau-Desvoidy, 1830
- Iceliopsis Guimarães, 1976
- Iconofrontina Townsend, 1931
- Ictericodexia Townsend, 1934
- Igneomyia Mesnil, 1950
- Imitomyia Townsend, 1912
- Impeccantia Reinhard, 1961
- Incamyia Townsend, 1912
- Incamyiopsis Townsend, 1919
- Intrapales Villeneuve, 1938
- Irengia Townsend, 1935
- Isafarus Richter, 1976
- Ischyrophaga Townsend, 1915
- Isidotus Reinhard, 1962
- Isochaetina Mesnil, 1950
- Isopexopsis Sun & Chao, 1994
- Isosturmia Townsend, 1927
- Istocheta Rondani, 1859
- Itacnephalia Townsend, 1927
- Itacuphocera Townsend, 1927
- Italispidea Townsend, 1927
- Italydella Townsend, 1927
- Itamintho Townsend, 1931
- Itaplectops Townsend, 1927
- Itasaundersia Townsend, 1927
- Itasturmia Townsend, 1927
- Itavoria Townsend, 1931
- Itaxanthomelana Townsend, 1927
- Iteuthelaira Townsend, 1927

== J ==
- Jamacaria Curran, 1928
- Janthinomyia Brauer & von Bergenstamm, 1893
- Jurinella Brauer & von Bergenstamm, 1889
- Jurinia Robineau-Desvoidy, 1830
- Juriniopsis Townsend, 1916
- Juriniosoma Townsend, 1927
- Jurinodexia Townsend, 1915

== K ==
- Kaiseriola Mesnil, 1970
- Kallisomyia Borisova, 1964
- Kambaitimyia Mesnil, 1953
- Kinangopana van Emden, 1960
- Kiniatiliops Mesnil, 1955
- Kiniatilla Villeneuve, 1938
- Kirbya Robineau-Desvoidy, 1830
- Klugia Robineau-Desvoidy, 1863
- Koralliomyia Mesnil, 1950
- Kuwanimyia Townsend, 1916

== L ==
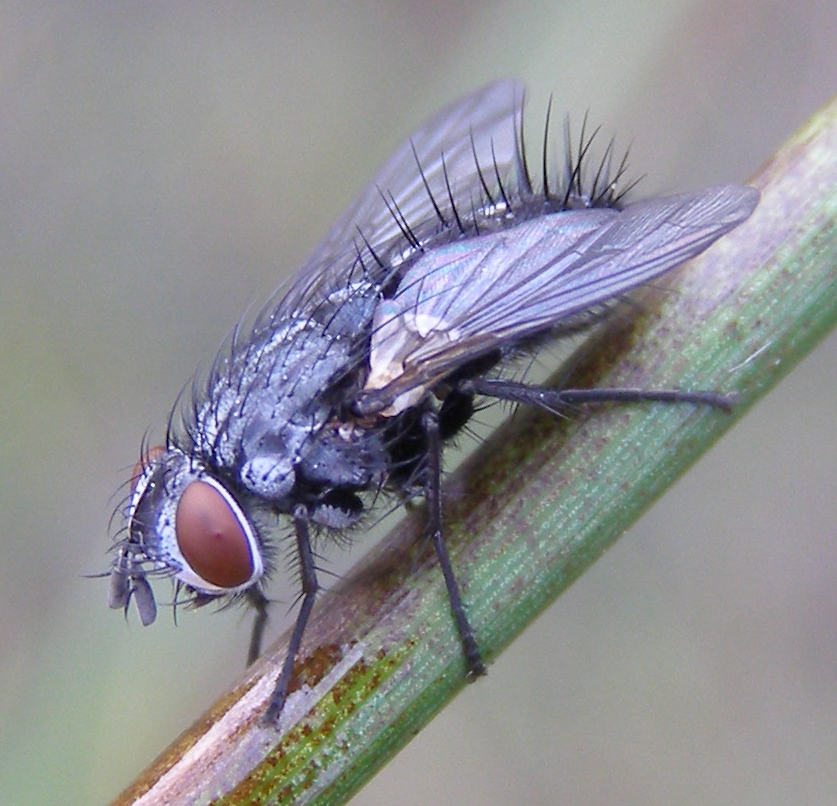
Lydella sp

- Labigastera Macquart, 1834
- Lafuentemyia Marnef, 1965
- Lambrusca Richter, 1998
- Lasiona van der Wulp, 1890
- Lasiopales Villeneuve, 1922
- Lasiopalpus Macquart, 1847
- Latiginella Villeneuve, 1936
- Laufferiella Villeneuve, 1929
- Lecanipa Rondani, 1859
- Leiophora Robineau-Desvoidy, 1863
- Leptidosophia Townsend, 1931
- Leptodexia Townsend, 1919
- Leptomacquartia Townsend, 1919
- Leptostylum Macquart, 1851
- Leptothelaira Mesnil & Shima, 1979
- Leschenaultia Robineau-Desvoidy, 1830
- Leskia Robineau-Desvoidy, 1830
- Leskiola Mesnil, 1957
- Leskiolydella Townsend, 1927
- Leskiopsis Townsend, 1916
- Lespesia Robineau-Desvoidy, 1863
- Leucocarcelia Villeneuve, 1921
- Leucostoma Meigen, 1803
- Leverella Baranov, 1934
- Ligeria Robineau-Desvoidy, 1863
- Ligeriella Mesnil, 1961
- Lindigepalpus Townsend, 1931
- Lindigia Townsend, 1931
- Lindneriola Mesnil, 1959
- Linnaemya Robineau-Desvoidy, 1830
- Lissoglossa Villeneuve, 1912
- Litophasia Girschner, 1887
- Lixadmontia Wood & Cave, 2006
- Lixophaga Townsend, 1908
- Loewia Egger, 1856
- Lomachantha Rondani, 1859
- Lophosia Meigen, 1824
- Lophosiosoma Mesnil, 1973
- Lubutana Villeneuve, 1938
- Lydella Robineau-Desvoidy, 1830
- Lydellina Villeneuve, 1916
- Lydellothelaira Townsend, 1919
- Lydina Robineau-Desvoidy, 1830
- Lydinolydella Townsend, 1927
- Lygaeomyia Aldrich, 1934
- Lypha Robineau-Desvoidy, 1830
- Lyphosia Mesnil, 1957

== M ==
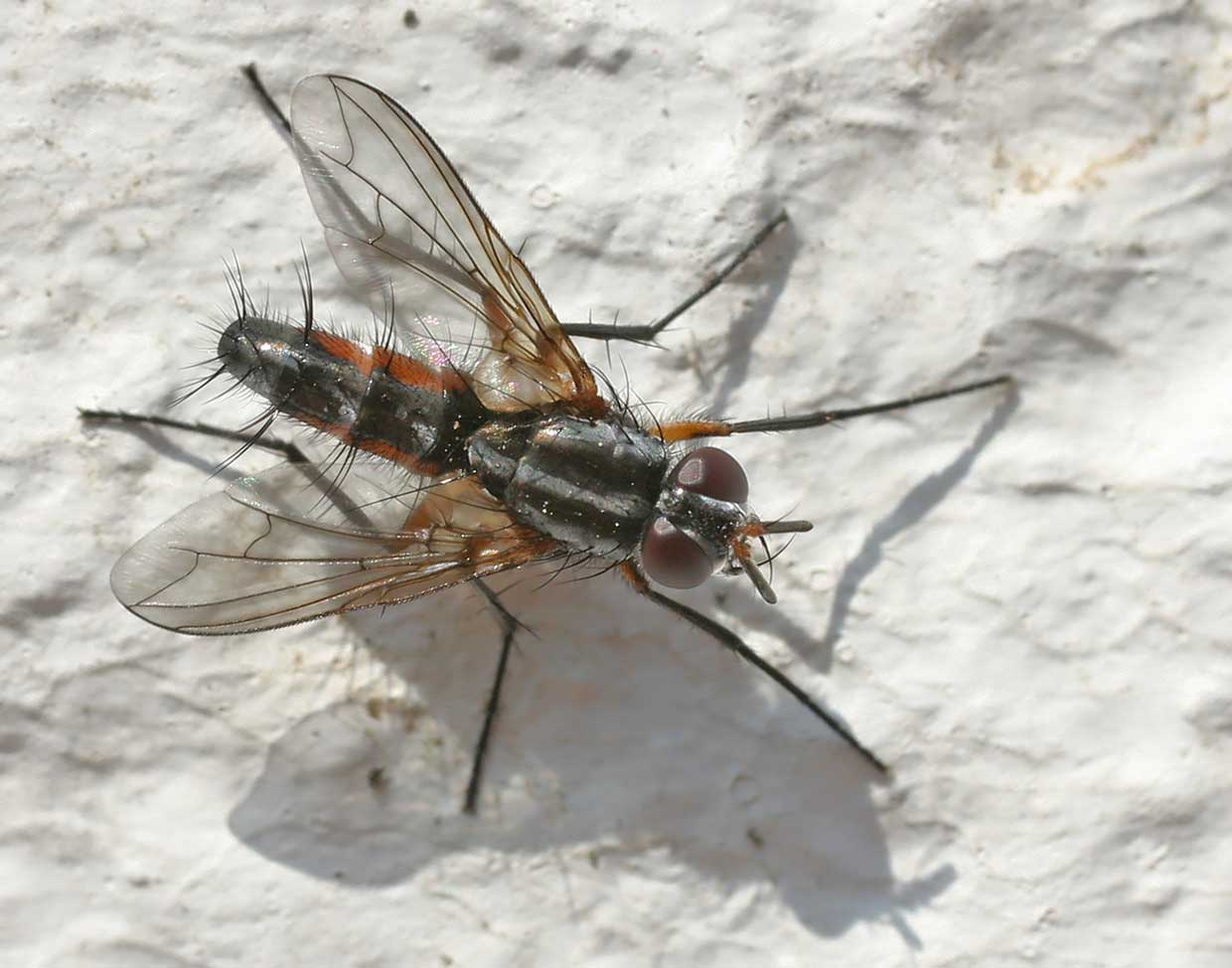
Mintho rufiventris

- Macquartia Robineau-Desvoidy, 1830
- Macrochloria Malloch, 1929
- Macrohoughia Townsend, 1927
- Macrohoughiopsis Townsend, 1927
- Macrojurinia Townsend, 1916
- Macrometopa Brauer & von Bergenstamm, 1889
- Macromya Robineau-Desvoidy, 1830
- Macroprosopa Brauer & von Bergenstamm, 1889
- Mactomyia Reinhard, 1958
- Maculosalia Mesnil, 1946
- Madremyia Townsend, 1916
- Magripa Richter, 1988
- Mahauiella Toma, 2003
- Malayia Malloch, 1926
- Mallochomacquartia Townsend, 1934
- Manola Richter, 1982
- Manteomasiphya Guimarães, 1966
- Marnefia Cortés, 1982
- Marshallomyia van Emden, 1960
- Masicera Macquart, 1834
- Masiphya Brauer & von Bergenstamm, 1891
- Masiphyoidea Thompson, 1963
- Masistyloides Mesnil, 1963
- Masistylum Brauer & von Bergenstamm, 1893
- Mastigiomyia Reinhard, 1964
- Matucania Townsend, 1919
- Mauritiodoria Townsend, 1932
- Mauromyia Coquillett, 1897
- Mayodistichona Townsend, 1928
- Mayoschizocera Townsend, 1927
- Medina Robineau-Desvoidy, 1830
- Medinella Dugdale, 1969
- Medinodexia Townsend, 1927
- Medinomyia Mesnil, 1957
- Medinophyto Townsend, 1927
- Medinospila Mesnil, 1977
- Mediosetiger Barraclough, 1983
- Megaparia van der Wulp, 1891
- Megapariopsis Townsend, 1915
- Megaprosopus Macquart, 1844
- Megistogastropsis Townsend, 1916
- Mehmetia Özdikmen, 2007
- Meigenia Robineau-Desvoidy, 1830
- Meigenielloides Townsend, 1919
- Melanasomyia Malloch, 1935
- Melanepalpellus Townsend, 1927
- Melanepalpus Townsend, 1914
- Melanesomyia Barraclough, 1998
- Melanophrys Williston, 1886
- Melanorlopteryx Townsend, 1927
- Melanoromintho Townsend, 1935
- Melanorophasia Townsend, 1934
- Meledonus Aldrich, 1926
- Meleterus Aldrich, 1926
- Melisoneura Rondani, 1861
- Mellachnus Aldrich, 1934
- Mendelssohnia Kugler, 1971
- Mesembrierigone Townsend, 1931
- Mesembrinormia Townsend, 1931
- Mesnilana van Emden, 1945
- Mesniletta Herting, 1979
- Mesnilisca Zimin, 1974
- Mesnilius Özdikmen, 2006
- Mesnilomyia Kugler, 1972
- Mesnilotrix Cerretti & O’Hara in O’Hara & Cerretti, 2016
- Mesnilus Özdikmen, 2007
- Metacemyia Herting, 1969
- Metadrinomyia Shima, 1980
- Metamyiophasia Blanchard, 1966
- Metamyobia Townsend, 1927
- Metaphorocera Thompson, 1968
- Metaphryno Crosskey, 1967
- Metaplagia Coquillett, 1895
- Metopiopsis Vimmer & Soukup, 1940
- Metopoactia Townsend, 1927
- Metopomuscopteryx Townsend, 1915
- Miamimyia Townsend, 1916
- Miamimyiops Townsend, 1939
- Microaporia Townsend, 1919
- Microcerophina Kugler, 1977
- Microchaetina van der Wulp, 1891
- Microchaetogyne Townsend, 1931
- Microgymnomma Townsend, 1916
- Microhystricia Malloch, 1938
- Micromasiphya Townsend, 1934
- Micronychia Brauer & von Bergenstamm, 1889
- Micronychiops Townsend, 1915
- Microphthalma Macquart, 1844
- Microplagia Townsend, 1915
- Microsillus Aldrich, 1926
- Microsoma Macquart, 1855
- Microtropesa Macquart, 1846
- Mikia Kowarz, 1885
- Milada Richter, 1973
- Mintho Robineau-Desvoidy, 1830
- Minthodes Brauer & von Bergenstamm, 1889
- Minthodexiopsis Townsend, 1927
- Mintholeskia Townsend, 1934
- Minthoplagia Townsend, 1915
- Minthopsis Townsend, 1915
- Minthotachina Townsend, 1935
- Minthoxia Mesnil, 1968
- Mitannia Herting, 1987
- Mochlosoma Brauer & von Bergenstamm, 1889
- Mongolomintho Richter, 1976
- Monoleptophaga Baranov, 1938
- Montanarturia Miller, 1945
- Montanothalma Barraclough, 1996
- Montserratia Thompson, 1964
- Montuosa Chao & Zhou, 1996
- Moreiria Townsend, 1932
- Morphodexia Townsend, 1931
- Munira Richter, 1974
- Muscopteryx Townsend, 1892
- Myatelemus Reinhard, 1967
- Mycteromyiella Mesnil, 1966
- Myiochaeta Cortés, 1967
- Myioclura Reinhard, 1974
- Myiodexia Cortés & Campos, 1971
- Myiomima Brauer & von Bergenstamm, 1889
- Myiomintho Brauer & von Bergenstamm, 1889
- Myiopharus Brauer & von Bergenstamm, 1889
- Myiophasiomima Blanchard, 1966
- Myiophasiopsis Townsend, 1927
- Myioscotiptera Giglio-Tos, 1893
- Myiosturmiopsis Thompson, 1963
- Myiotrixa Brauer & von Bergenstamm, 1893
- Myobiomima Townsend, 1926
- Myostoma Robineau-Desvoidy, 1830
- Myothyriopsis Townsend, 1919
- Mystacella van der Wulp, 1890
- Mystacomyia Giglio-Tos, 1893
- Mystacomyoidea Thompson, 1963
- Myxarchiclops Villeneuve, 1916
- Myxexoristops Townsend, 1911
- Myxophryxe Cerretti & O’Hara in O’Hara & Cerretti, 2016

== N ==
- Naira Richter, 1970
- Nanoplagia Villeneuve, 1929
- Neaera Robineau-Desvoidy, 1830
- Nealsomyia Mesnil, 1939
- Neaphria Townsend, 1914
- Nemoraea Robineau-Desvoidy, 1830
- Nemorilla Rondani, 1856
- Nemorilloides Brauer & von Bergenstamm, 1891
- Neoargyrophylax Townsend, 1927
- Neobrachelia Townsend, 1931
- Neocampylochaeta Townsend, 1927
- Neochaetoplagia Blanchard, 1963
- Neocraspedothrix Townsend, 1927
- Neocuphocera Townsend, 1927
- Neocyrtophoeba Vimmer & Soukup, 1940
- Neoemdenia Mesnil, 1953
- Neoerythronychia Malloch, 1932
- Neoeuantha Townsend, 1931
- Neogymnomma Townsend, 1915
- Neolophosia Townsend, 1939
- Neolydella Mesnil, 1939
- Neomasiphya Guimarães, 1966
- Neomedina Malloch, 1935
- Neometachaeta Townsend, 1915
- Neomintho Brauer & von Bergenstamm, 1891
- Neominthoidea Thompson, 1968
- Neominthopsis Townsend, 1915
- Neomyostoma Townsend, 1935
- Neopaedarium Blanchard, 1943
- Neophasmophaga Guimarães, 1982
- Neophryxe Townsend, 1916
- Neoplectops Malloch, 1930
- Neopodomyia Townsend, 1927
- Neosolieria Townsend, 1927
- Neosophia Guimarães, 1982
- Neossarromyia Townsend, 1927
- Neotachina Malloch, 1938
- Neotrafoiopsis Townsend, 1931
- Neotryphera Malloch, 1938
- Neoxanthobasis Blanchard, 1966
- Neozelia Guimarães, 1975
- Nephochaetona Townsend, 1919
- Nephoplagia Townsend, 1919
- Nepocarcelia Townsend, 1927
- Nepophasmophaga Townsend, 1927
- Neximyia Crosskey, 1967
- Nicephorus Reinhard, 1944
- Nigara Richter, 1999
- Nigrilypha O’Hara, 2002
- Nilea Robineau-Desvoidy, 1863
- Nimioglossa Reinhard, 1945
- Nothovoria Cortés & González, 1989
- Notoderus Cortés, 1986
- Notodytes Aldrich, 1934
- Notomanes Aldrich, 1934

== O ==
- Oberonomyia Reinhard, 1964
- Oblitoneura Mesnil, 1975
- Obscuromyia Barraclough & O’Hara, 1998
- Occisor Hutton, 1901
- Ochrocera Townsend, 1916
- Ochroepalpus Townsend, 1927
- Ocypteromima Townsend, 1916
- Ocyrtosoma Townsend, 1912
- Ocytata Gistel, 1848
- Oedemamedina Townsend, 1927
- Oestrohystricia Townsend, 1912
- Oestrophasia Brauer & von Bergenstamm, 1889
- Oligoestrus Townsend. 1932
- Olinda Robineau-Desvoidy, 1830
- Ollachactia Townsend, 1927
- Ollachea Townsend, 1919
- Ollacheryphe Townsend, 1927
- Onychogonia Brauer & von Bergenstamm, 1889
- Oomasicera Townsend, 1911
- Opesia Robineau-Desvoidy, 1863
- Ophirion Townsend, 1911
- Ophirodexia Townsend, 1911
- Ophirosturmia Townsend, 1911
- Opsoempheria Townsend, 1927
- Opsomeigenia Townsend, 1919
- Opsophasiopteryx Townsend, 1917
- Opsosturmia Townsend, 1927
- Opsotheresia Townsend, 1919
- Opsozelia Townsend, 1919
- Opticopteryx Townsend, 1931
- Oraeosoma Cortés, 1976
- Oraphasmophaga Reinhard, 1958
- Orasturmia Reinhard, 1947
- Orestilla Reinhard, 1944
- Ormia Robineau-Desvoidy, 1830
- Ormiophasia Townsend, 1919
- Orohoughia Townsend, 1934
- Oromasiphya Townsend, 1927
- Orthosimyia Reinhard, 1944
- Ossidingia Townsend, 1919
- Ostracophyto Townsend, 1915
- Oswaldia Robineau-Desvoidy, 1863
- Otomasicera Townsend, 1912
- Oxyaporia Townsend, 1919
- Oxyepalpus Townsend, 1927
- Oxymedoria Villeneuve, 1916
- Oxynops Townsend, 1912
- Oxyphyllomyia Villeneuve, 1937

== P ==
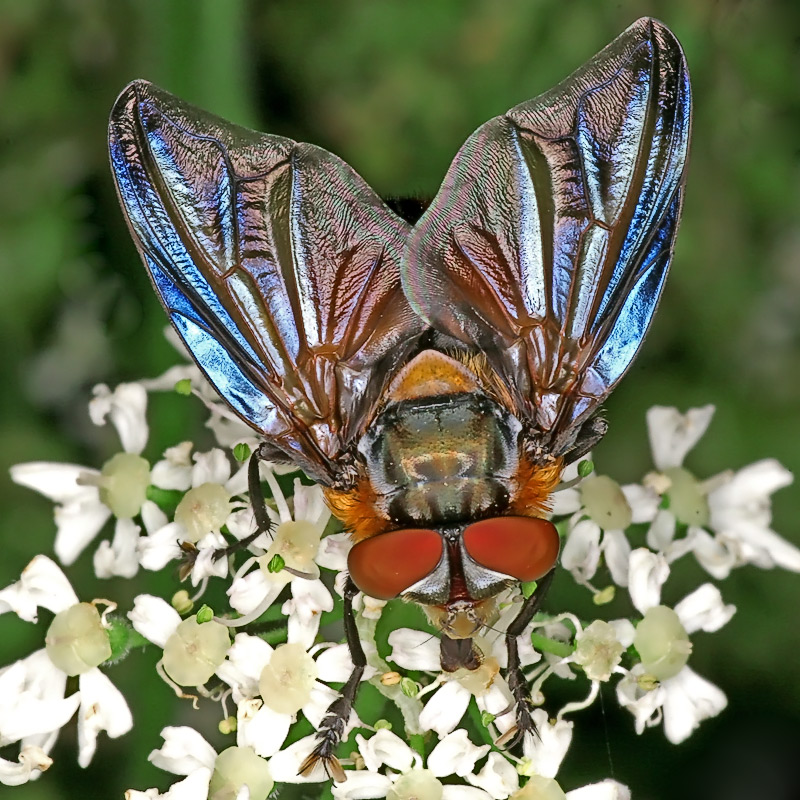
Phasia hemiptera

- Pachymyia Macquart, 1843
- Pachynocera Townsend, 1919
- Pachystylum Macquart, 1848
- Paedarium Aldrich, 1926
- Pales Robineau-Desvoidy, 1830
- Palesisa Villeneuve, 1929
- Palia Curran, 1927
- Paliana Curran, 1927
- Palmonia Kugler, 1972
- Palpolinnaemyia Townsend, 1927
- Palpostoma Robineau-Desvoidy, 1830
- Palpotachina Townsend, 1915
- Palpozenillia Townsend, 1934
- Pammaerus Aldrich, 1927
- Pandelleia Villeneuve, 1907
- Panzeria Robineau-Desvoidy, 1830
- Parabothria Vimmer & Soukup, 1940
- Parabrachycoma Blanchard, 1940
- Paraclara Bezzi, 1908
- Paradejeania Brauer & von Bergenstamm, 1893
- Paradidyma Brauer & von Bergenstamm, 1891
- Paradrino Mesnil, 1949
- Paralypha Mesnil, 1963
- Paramesochaeta Brauer & von Bergenstamm, 1891
- Parapales Mesnil, 1950
- Parapexopsis Mesnil, 1953
- Paraphasiopsis Townsend, 1917
- Paraphasmophaga Townsend, 1915
- Parapoliops Blanchard, 1957
- Pararchytas Brauer & von Bergenstamm, 1895
- Pararondania Villeneuve, 1916
- Pararrhinactia Townsend, 1935
- Parasetigena Brauer & von Bergenstamm, 1891
- Paratachina Brauer & von Bergenstamm, 1891
- Paratrixa Brauer & von Bergenstamm, 1891
- Paratropeza Paramonov, 1964
- Paratryphera Brauer & von Bergenstamm, 1891
- Paravibrissina Shima, 1979
- Paraxanthobasis Blanchard, 1966
- Parazelia Townsend, 1919
- Parechinotachina Townsend, 1931
- Parepalpus Coquillett, 1902
- Parerigone Brauer, 1898
- Pareupogona Townsend, 1916
- Parhamaxia Mesnil, 1967
- Parodomyiops Townsend, 1935
- Paropesia Mesnil, 1970
- Paropsivora Malloch, 1934
- Parthenoleskia Townsend, 1941
- Patelloa Townsend, 1916
- Patillalia Curran, 1934
- Patulifrons Barraclough, 1992
- Paulipalpus Barraclough, 1992
- Pelamera Herting, 1969
- Pelashyria Villeneuve, 1935
- Pelatachina Meade, 1894
- Pelecotheca Townsend, 1919
- Peleteria Robineau-Desvoidy, 1830
- Pelycops Aldrich, 1934
- Pennapoda Townsend, 1897
- Pentatomophaga de Meijere, 1917
- Penthosia van der Wulp, 1892
- Penthosiosoma Townsend, 1926
- Peracroglossa Townsend, 1931
- Peremptor Hutton, 1901
- Periarchiclops Villeneuve, 1924
- Peribaea Robineau-Desvoidy, 1863
- Perigymnosoma Villeneuve, 1929
- Perioptichochaeta Townsend, 1927
- Periostoma Cortés, 1986
- Periscepsia Gistel, 1848
- Peristasisea Villeneuve, 1934
- Perrissina Malloch, 1938
- Perrissinoides Dugdale, 1962
- Persedea Richter, 2001
- Perumyia Arnaud, 1963
- Petagnia Rondani, 1856
- Peteina Meigen, 1838
- Petrargyrops Townsend, 1927
- Pexopsis Brauer & von Bergenstamm, 1889
- Phaeodema Aldrich, 1934
- Phalacrophyto Townsend, 1915
- Phania Meigen, 1824
- Phantasiomyia Townsend, 1915
- Phaoniella Malloch, 1938
- Phasia Latreille, 1804
- Phasiatacta Townsend, 1911
- Phasiocyptera Townsend, 1927
- Phasioormia Townsend, 1933
- Phasiophyto Townsend, 1919
- Phasiops Coquillett, 1899
- Phasmofrontina Townsend, 1931
- Phasmophaga Townsend, 1909
- Phebellia Robineau-Desvoidy, 1846
- Philippodexia Townsend, 1926
- Philocorus Cortés, 1976
- Phobetromyia Reinhard, 1964
- Phonomyia Brauer & von Bergenstamm, 1893
- Phorcidella Mesnil, 1946
- Phorinia Robineau-Desvoidy, 1830
- Phorocera Robineau-Desvoidy, 1830
- Phorocerosoma Townsend, 1927
- Phorocerostoma Malloch, 1930
- Phosocephala Townsend, 1908
- Phryno Robineau-Desvoidy, 1830
- Phrynotachina Townsend, 1927
- Phryxe Robineau-Desvoidy, 1830
- Phyllaristomyia Townsend, 1931
- Phyllomya Robineau-Desvoidy, 1830
- Phyllophilopsis Townsend, 1915
- Phyllophryno Townsend, 1927
- Phytomyptera Rondani, 1844
- Phytomypterina van Emden, 1960
- Phytorophaga Bezzi, 1923
- Picconia Robineau-Desvoidy, 1863
- Pictoepalpus Townsend, 1915
- Piligena van Emden, 1947
- Piligenoides Barraclough, 1985
- Pilimyia Malloch, 1930
- Pimelimyia Mesnil, 1949
- Piriona Aldrich, 1928
- Pirionimyia Townsend, 1931
- Piximactia Townsend, 1927
- Plagimasicera Townsend, 1915
- Plagiocoma Villeneuve, 1916
- Plagiomima Brauer & von Bergenstamm, 1891
- Plagiomyia Curran, 1927
- Planomyia Aldrich, 1934
- Platydexia van Emden, 1954
- Platymya Robineau-Desvoidy, 1830
- Platyrrhinodexia Townsend, 1927
- Platyschineria Villeneuve, 1942
- Platytachina Malloch, 1938
- Platytainia Macquart, 1851
- Plectopsis Townsend, 1927
- Plesina Meigen, 1838
- Plesiodexilla Blanchard, 1966
- Plethochaetigera Malloch, 1938
- Pododexia Brauer & von Bergenstamm, 1889
- Podosturmia Townsend, 1928
- Policheta Rondani, 1856
- Poliops Aldrich, 1934
- Polistiopsis Townsend, 1915
- Polybiocyptera Guimarães, 1979
- Polychaeta Macquart, 1851
- Polygaster van der Wulp, 1890
- Polygastropteryx Mesnil, 1953
- Porphyromus van Emden, 1960
- Pradocania Tschorsnig, 1997
- Pretoriamyia Curran, 1927
- Pretoriana Curran, 1938
- Procarcelia Townsend, 1927
- Proceromyia Mesnil, 1957
- Procleonice Townsend, 1935
- Prodegeeria Brauer & von Bergenstamm, 1895
- Prodemoticus Villeneuve, 1919
- Prodiaphania Townsend, 1927
- Proleskia Townsend, 1927
- Proleskiomima Townsend, 1934
- Prolophosia Townsend, 1933
- Prolypha Townsend, 1934
- Promegaparia Townsend, 1931
- Prometopiops Townsend, 1927
- Promintho Townsend, 1926
- Pronemorilla Townsend, 1935
- Prooppia Townsend, 1926
- Proparachaeta Townsend, 1928
- Proparachaetopsis Blanchard, 1942
- Prophasiopsis Townsend, 1927
- Prophorostoma Townsend, 1927
- Prorhynchops Brauer & von Bergenstamm, 1891
- Proriedelia Mesnil, 1953
- Proroglutea Townsend, 1919
- Proscissio Hutton, 1901
- Prosena Lepeletier & Serville, 1828
- Prosenactia Blanchard, 1940
- Prosenina Malloch, 1930
- Prosenoides Brauer & von Bergenstamm, 1891
- Prosenosoma Malloch, 1938
- Prosethilla Herting, 1984
- Prosheliomyia Brauer & von Bergenstamm, 1891
- Prosopea Rondani, 1861
- Prosopochaeta Macquart, 1851
- Prosopofrontina Townsend, 1926
- Prospalaea Aldrich, 1925
- Prospanipalpus Townsend, 1931
- Prospherysa van der Wulp, 1890
- Prospherysodoria Townsend, 1928
- Prosuccingulum Mesnil, 1959
- Protaporia Townsend, 1919
- Protodejeania Townsend, 1915
- Protogoniops Townsend, 1913
- Protogoniopsis Townsend, 1915
- Protohystricia Malloch, 1929
- Protonotodytes Blanchard, 1966
- Protrichoprosopis Blanchard, 1966
- Protypophaemyia Blanchard, 1963
- Proxanthobasis Blanchard, 1966
- Psalidoxena Villeneuve, 1941
- Psecacera Bigot, 1880
- Pseudalsomyia Mesnil, 1968
- Pseudobombyliomyia Townsend, 1931
- Pseudobrullaea Mesnil, 1957
- Pseudochaeta Coquillett, 1895
- Pseudochaetona Townsend, 1919
- Pseudodexia Brauer & von Bergenstamm, 1891
- Pseudodexilla O'Hara, Shima & Zhang, 2009
- Pseudodinera Brauer & von Bergenstamm, 1891
- Pseudogonia Brauer & von Bergenstamm, 1889
- Pseudomasiphya Thompson, 1963
- Pseudominthodes Townsend, 1933
- Pseudopachystylum Mik, 1891
- Pseudoperichaeta Brauer & von Bergenstamm, 1889
- Pseudoredtenbacheria Brauer & von Bergenstamm, 1889
- Pseudorrhinactia Thompson, 1968
- Pseudosiphosturmia Thompson, 1966
- Pseudosturmia Thompson, 1966
- Pseudoviviania Brauer & von Bergenstamm, 1891
- Pseudoxanthozona Townsend, 1931
- Pseudoxanthozonella Townsend, 1931
- Pterotopeza Townsend, 1908
- Ptesiomyia Brauer & von Bergenstamm, 1893
- Ptilocatagonia Mesnil, 1956
- Ptilodegeeria Brauer & von Bergenstamm, 1891
- Ptilodexia Brauer & von Bergenstamm, 1889
- Ptilogonia Bischof, 1904
- Ptilomyiopsis Townsend, 1933
- Ptilomyoides Curran, 1928
- Punamyia Townsend, 1915
- Punamyocera Townsend, 1919
- Pygidimyia Crosskey, 1967
- Pygocalcager Townsend, 1935
- Pyrrhodexia Townsend, 1931
- Pyrrhoernestia Townsend, 1931
- Pyrrhotachina Townsend, 1931

== Q ==
- Quadra Malloch, 1929
- Quadratosoma Townsend, 1914

== R ==
- Ramonda Robineau-Desvoidy, 1830
- Ramonella Kugler, 1980
- Rasiliverpa Barraclough, 1992
- Rcortesia Koçak & Kemal, 2010
- Redtenbacheria Schiner, 1861
- Reichardia Karsch, 1886
- Rhachoepalpus Townsend, 1908
- Rhachosaundersia Townsend, 1931
- Rhacodinella Mesnil, 1968
- Rhamphina Macquart, 1835
- Rhamphinina Bigot, 1885
- Rhaphiochaeta Brauer & von Bergenstamm, 1889
- Rhinaplomyia Mesnil, 1955
- Rhinomacquartia Brauer & von Bergenstamm, 1891
- Rhinomyobia Brauer & von Bergenstamm, 1893
- Rhinomyodes Townsend, 1933
- Rhombothyria van der Wulp, 1891
- Rhombothyriops Townsend, 1915
- Rhynchogonia Brauer & von Bergenstamm, 1893
- Richteriola Mesnil, 1963
- Ricosia Curran, 1927
- Riedelia Mesnil, 1942
- Rioteria Herting, 1973
- Robinaldia Herting, 1983
- Rondania Robineau-Desvoidy, 1850
- Rondaniooestrus Villeneuve, 1916
- Rossimyiops Mesnil, 1953
- Ruiziella Cortés, 1951
- Rutilia Robineau-Desvoidy, 1830
- Rutilodexia Townsend, 1915
- Rutilotrixa Townsend, 1933

== S ==
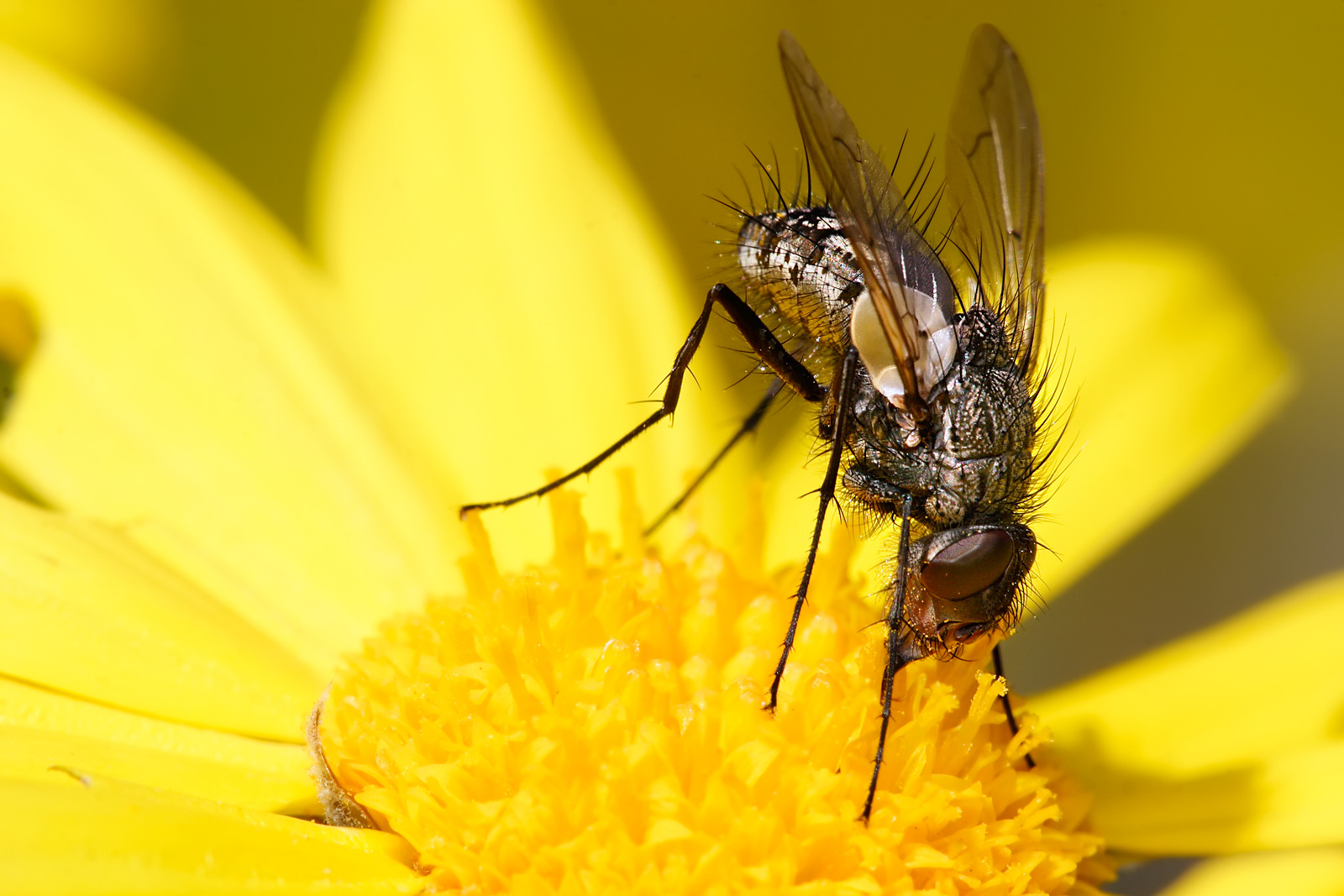
Senostoma sp.

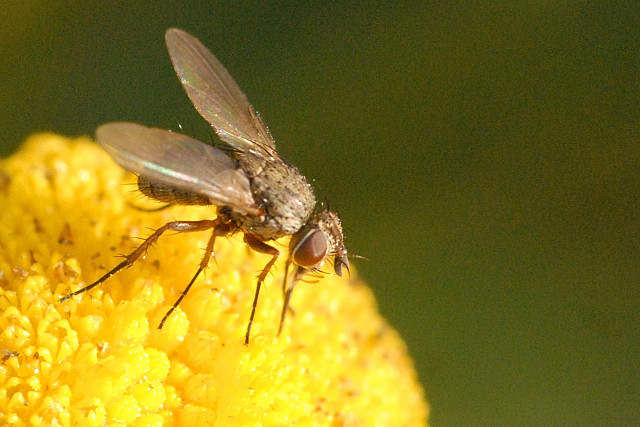
Siphona pauciseta

- Saralba Walker, 1865
- Sarcocalirrhoe Townsend, 1928
- Sarcoprosena Townsend, 1927
- Sarrorhina Villeneuve, 1936
- Sarromyia Pokorny, 1893
- Saundersiops Townsend, 1914
- Scaphimyia Mesnil, 1953
- Schembria Rondani, 1861
- Schineria Rondani, 1857
- Schistostephana Townsend, 1919
- Schiziotachina Walker, 1852
- Schizolinnaea van Emden, 1960
- Schlingermyia Cortés, 1967
- Schwarzalia Curran, 1934
- Scomma Richter, 1972
- Scotiptera Macquart, 1835
- Semisuturia Malloch, 1927
- Senometopia Macquart, 1834
- Senostoma Macquart, 1847
- Sepseocara Richter, 1986
- Sericodoria Townsend. 1928
- Sericotachina Townsend, 1916
- Sericozenillia Mesnil, 1957
- Setalunula Chao & Yang, 1990
- Setolestes Aldrich, 1934
- Shannonomyiella Townsend, 1939
- Signosoma Townsend, 1914
- Signosomopsis Townsend, 1914
- Simoma Aldrich, 1926
- Siphoactia Townsend, 1927
- Siphocrocuta Townsend, 1935
- Siphona Meigen, 1803
- Siphosturmia Coquillett, 1897
- Sisyphomyia Townsend, 1927
- Sisyropa Brauer & von Bergenstamm, 1889
- Sitellitergus Reinhard, 1964
- Smidtia Robineau-Desvoidy, 1830
- Solieria Robineau-Desvoidy, 1849
- Solomonilla Özdikmen, 2007
- Sonaca Richter, 1981
- Sophia Robineau-Desvoidy, 1830
- Sophiella Guimarães, 1982
- Sorochemyia Townsend, 1915
- Spallanzania Robineau-Desvoidy, 1830
- Spathidexia Townsend, 1912
- Spathipalpus Rondani, 1863
- Sphaerina van der Wulp, 1890
- Spilochaetosoma Smith, 1917
- Spiniabdomina Shi, 1991
- Spiroglossa Doleschall, 1858
- Squamomedina Townsend, 1934
- Stackelbergomyia Rohdendorf, 1948
- Staurochaeta Brauer & von Bergenstamm, 1889
- Steatosoma Aldrich, 1934
- Steleoneura Stein, 1924
- Stenodexia van der Wulp, 1891
- Stenosturmia Townsend, 1927
- Stiremania Cerretti & O’Hara in O’Hara & Cerretti, 2016
- Stolatosoma Reinhard, 1953
- Stomatodexia Brauer & von Bergenstamm, 1889
- Stomatotachina Townsend, 1931
- Stomina Robineau-Desvoidy, 1830
- Strongygaster Macquart, 1834
- Stuardomyia Cortés, 1945
- Sturmia Robineau-Desvoidy, 1830
- Sturmiellina Thompson, 1963
- Sturmimasiphya Townsend, 1935
- Sturmioactia Townsend, 1926
- Sturmiodexia Townsend, 1919
- Sturmiomima Townsend, 1934
- Sturmiopsis Townsend, 1916
- Sturmiopsoidea Thompson, 1966
- Subclytia Pandellé, 1894
- Subfischeria Villeneuve, 1937
- Succingulodes Townsend, 1935
- Suensonomyia Mesnil, 1953
- Sumichrastia Townsend, 1916
- Sumpigaster Macquart, 1855
- Symmorphomyia Mesnil & Shima, 1977
- Synactia Villeneuve, 1916
- Synamphichaeta Villeneuve, 1936
- Syringosoma Townsend, 1917

== T ==
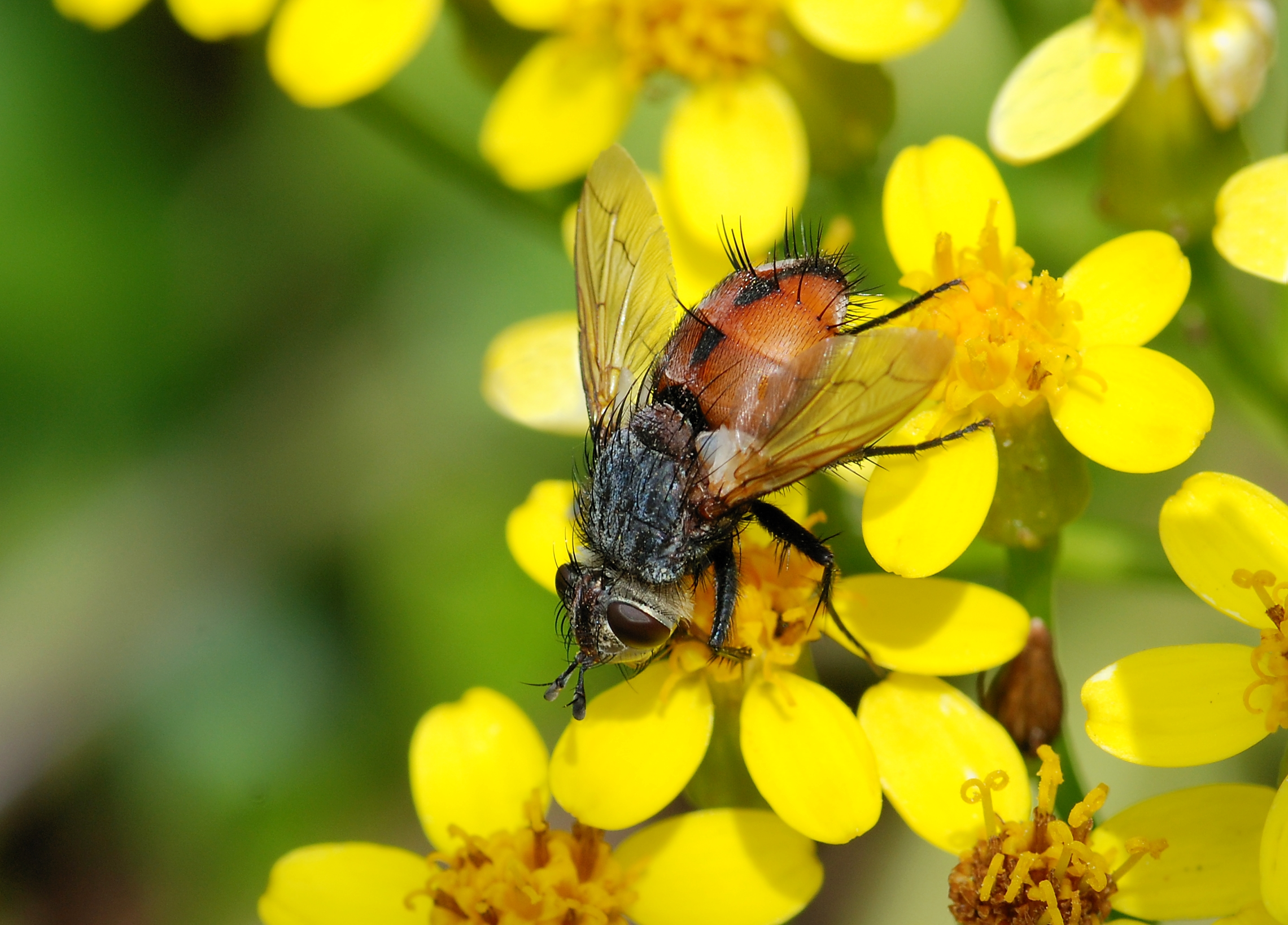
Tachina praeceps

- Tachina Meigen, 1803
- Tachineo Malloch, 1938
- Tachinoestrus Portschinsky, 1887
- Tachinomyia Townsend, 1892
- Tachinophasia Townsend, 1931
- Takanoella Baranov, 1935
- Takanomyia Mesnil, 1957
- Talarocera Williston, 1888
- Tapajohoughia Townsend. 1934
- Tapajoleskia Townsend, 1934
- Tapajosia Townsend, 1934
- Taperamyia Townsend, 1935
- Tarassus Aldrich, 1933
- Tarpessita Reinhard, 1967
- Tasmaniomyia Townsend, 1916
- Technamyia Reinhard, 1974
- Telodytes Aldrich, 1934
- Telonotomyia Cortés, 1986
- Telothyria van der Wulp, 1890
- Teretrophora Macquart, 1851
- Tesseracephalus Reinhard, 1955
- Tetragimyia Shima & Takahashi, 2011
- Tettigoniophaga Guimarães, 1978
- Thecocarcelia Townsend, 1933
- Thelaira Robineau-Desvoidy, 1830
- Thelairaporia Guimarães, 1980
- Thelairochaetona Townsend, 1919
- Thelairodes van der Wulp, 1891
- Thelairodoria Townsend, 1927
- Thelairodoriopsis Thompson, 1968
- Thelairodrino Mesnil, 1954
- Thelairoleskia Townsend, 1926
- Thelairophasia Townsend, 1919
- Thelairosoma Villeneuve, 1916
- Thelyconychia Brauer & von Bergenstamm, 1889
- Thelymorpha Brauer & von Bergenstamm, 1889
- Thelymyia Brauer & von Bergenstamm, 1891
- Thelyoxynops Townsend, 1927
- Therobia Brauer, 1862
- Thrixion Brauer & von Bergenstamm, 1889
- Thryptodexia Malloch, 1926
- Thysanopsis Townsend, 1917
- Thysanosturmia Townsend, 1927
- Tipulidomima Townsend, 1933
- Tlephusa Robineau-Desvoidy, 1863
- Tlpuloleskia Townsend, 1931
- Topomeigenia Townsend, 1919
- Torocca Walker, 1859
- Torosomyia Reinhard, 1935
- Tothillia Crosskey, 1976
- Townsendiellomyia Baranov, 1932
- Toxocnemis Macquart, 1855
- Trafoia Brauer & von Bergenstamm, 1893
- Trepophrys Townsend. 1908
- Triarthria Stephens, 1829
- Trichactia Stein, 1924
- Trichinochaeta Townsend, 1917
- Trichoceronia Cortes, 1945
- Trichodischia Bigot, 1885
- Trichodura Macquart, 1843
- Trichoepalpus Townsend, 1914
- Trichoformosomyia Baranov, 1934
- Trichophora Macquart, 1847
- Trichophoropsis Townsend, 1914
- Trichopoda Berthold, 1827
- Trichoprosopus Macquart, 1843
- Trichopyrrhosia Townsend, 1927
- Trichoraea Cortés, 1974
- Trichosaundersia Townsend, 1914
- Trichostylum Macquart, 1851
- Trichotopteryx Townsend, 1919
- Trichschizotachina Townsend, 1935d
- Trigonospila Pokorny, 1886
- Trinitodexia Townsend, 1935
- Triodontopyga Townsend, 1927
- Trischidocera Villeneuve, 1915
- Trismegistomya Reinhard, 1967
- Tritaxys Macquart, 1847
- Trixa Meigen, 1824
- Trixiceps Villeneuve, 1936
- Trixoclea Villeneuve, 1916
- Trixodes Coquillett, 1902
- Trixodopsis Townsend, 1933
- Trixomorpha Brauer & von Bergenstamm, 1889
- Trochilochaeta Townsend, 1940
- Trochilodes Coquillett, 1903
- Trochiloglossa Townsend, 1919
- Trochiloleskia Townsend, 1917
- Tromodesiana Townsend, 1931
- Tromodesiopsis Townsend, 1927
- Tropidodexia Townsend, 1915
- Tropidopsiomorpha Townsend, 1927
- Truphia Malloch, 1930
- Tryphera Meigen, 1838
- Trypherina Malloch, 1938
- Tsugaea Hall, 1939
- Tunapunia Thompson, 1963
- Turanogonia Rohdendorf, 1924
- Tylodexia Townsend, 1926
- Tyreomma Brauer & von Bergenstamm, 1891

== U ==
- Ucayalimyia Townsend. 1927
- Uclesia Girschner, 1901
- Uclesiella Malloch, 1938
- Ugimeigenia Townsend, 1916
- Uramya Robineau-Desvoidy, 1830
- Uraporia Townsend, 1919
- Urodexia Osten-Sacken, 1882
- Urodexiomima Townsend, 1927
- Uroeuantha Townsend, 1927
- Uromedina Townsend, 1926
- Ursophyto Aldrich, 1926
- Urucurymyia Townsend, 1934
- Uruhuasia Townsend, 1914
- Uruhuasiopsis Townsend, 1915
- Uruleskia Townsend, 1934
- Urumyobia Townsend, 1934
- Ushpayacua Townsend, 1928

== V ==
- Vanderwulpella Townsend, 1919
- Vanderwulpia Townsend, 1891
- Velardemyia Valencia, 1972
- Veluta Malloch, 1938
- Verrugomyia Townsend, 1927
- Verrugophryno Townsend, 1927
- Vertepalpus Curran, 1947
- Vibrissina Rondani, 1861
- Vibrissoepalpus Townsend, 1915
- Vibrissomyia Townsend, 1912
- Vibrissovoria Townsend, 1919
- Villanovia Strobl, 1910
- Visayalydina Townsend, 1926
- Voria Robineau-Desvoidy, 1830
- Voriella Malloch, 1930

== W ==
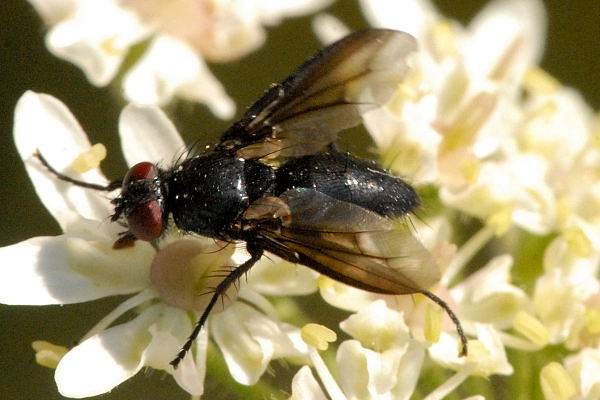
Wagneria costata

- Wagneria Robineau-Desvoidy, 1830
- Wardarina Mesnil, 1953
- Wattia Malloch, 1938
- Weberia Robineau-Desvoidy, 1830
- Weingaertneriella Baranov, 1932
- Winthellia Crosskey, 1967
- Winthemia Robineau-Desvoidy, 1830

== X ==
- Xanthobasis Aldrich, 1934
- Xanthodexia van der Wulp, 1891
- Xanthoepalpodes Townsend, 1913
- Xanthoepalpus Townsend, 1914
- Xanthomelanodes Townsend, 1893
- Xanthomelanopsis Townsend, 1917
- Xanthomera Hampson, 1914, 1908
- Xanthooestrus Villeneuve, 1914
- Xanthopelta Aldrich, 1934
- Xanthophyto Townsend, 1916
- Xanthopteromyia Townsend, 1926
- Xanthotheresia Townsend, 1931
- Xenoplagia Townsend, 1914
- Xenorhynchia Malloch, 1938
- Xeoprosopa Townsend, 1919
- Xiphochaeta Mesnil, 1968
- Xylocamptomima Townsend, 1927
- Xylotachina Brauer & von Bergenstamm, 1891
- Xysta Meigen, 1824

== Y ==
- Yahuarmayoia Townsend, 1927

== Z ==
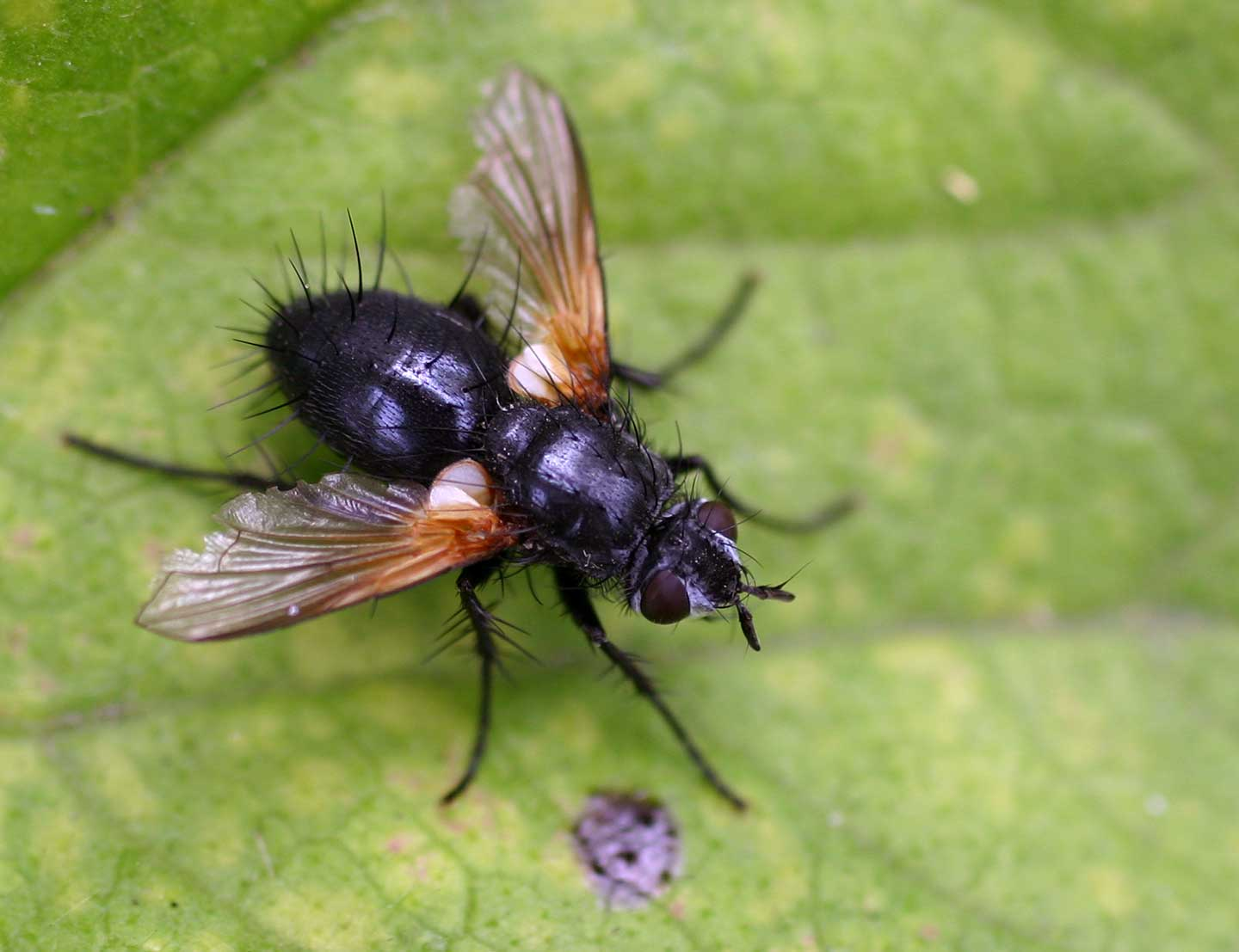
Zophomyia temula

- Zaira Robineau-Desvoidy, 1830
- Zambesa Walker, 1856
- Zambesomima Mesnil, 1967
- Zamimus Malloch, 1932
- Zealandotachina Malloch, 1938
- Zebromyia Malloch, 1929
- Zelia Robineau-Desvoidy, 1830
- Zelindopsis Anonymous, 1946
- Zeliomima Mesnil, 1976
- Zenargomyia Crosskey, 1964
- Zenillia Robineau-Desvoidy, 1830
- Zeuxia Meigen, 1826
- Zeuxiotrix Mesnil, 1976
- Ziminia Mesnil, 1963
- Zita Curran, 1927
- Zizyphomyia Townsend, 1916
- Zonalia Curran, 1934
- Zonoepalpus Townsend, 1927
- Zophomyia Macquart, 1835
- Zosteromeigenia Townsend, 1919
- Zygobothria Mik, 1891
- Zygozenillia Townsend, 1927
