= Degeeriopsis xanthogastra =

Scientific classification
- Kingdom: Animalia
- Phylum: Arthropoda
- Class: Insecta
- Order: Diptera
- Family: Tachinidae
- Subfamily: Exoristinae
- Tribe: Blondeliini
- Genus: Degeeriopsis
- Species: D. xanthogastra

Binomial name
- Degeeriopsis xanthogastra Mesnil, 1953

Species of fly

Degeeriopsis xanthogastra is a species of fly in the family Tachinidae.

== Distribution ==
Myanmar.
