= Telothyriini =

Scientific classification
- Kingdom: Animalia
- Phylum: Arthropoda
- Class: Insecta
- Order: Diptera
- Family: Tachinidae
- Subfamily: Dexiinae
- Tribe: Telothyriini; Townsend, 1927

Tribe of flies

Telothyriini is a tribe of bristle flies in the family Tachinidae.

== Genera ==
- Telothyria Wulp, 1890
