= Conactiodoria aurea =

Scientific classification
- Kingdom: Animalia
- Phylum: Arthropoda
- Class: Insecta
- Order: Diptera
- Family: Tachinidae
- Subfamily: Exoristinae
- Tribe: Blondeliini
- Genus: Conactiodoria
- Species: C. aurea

Binomial name
- Conactiodoria aurea Townsend, 1934

Species of fly

Conactiodoria aurea is a species of fly in the family Tachinidae.

== Distribution ==
Brazil.
