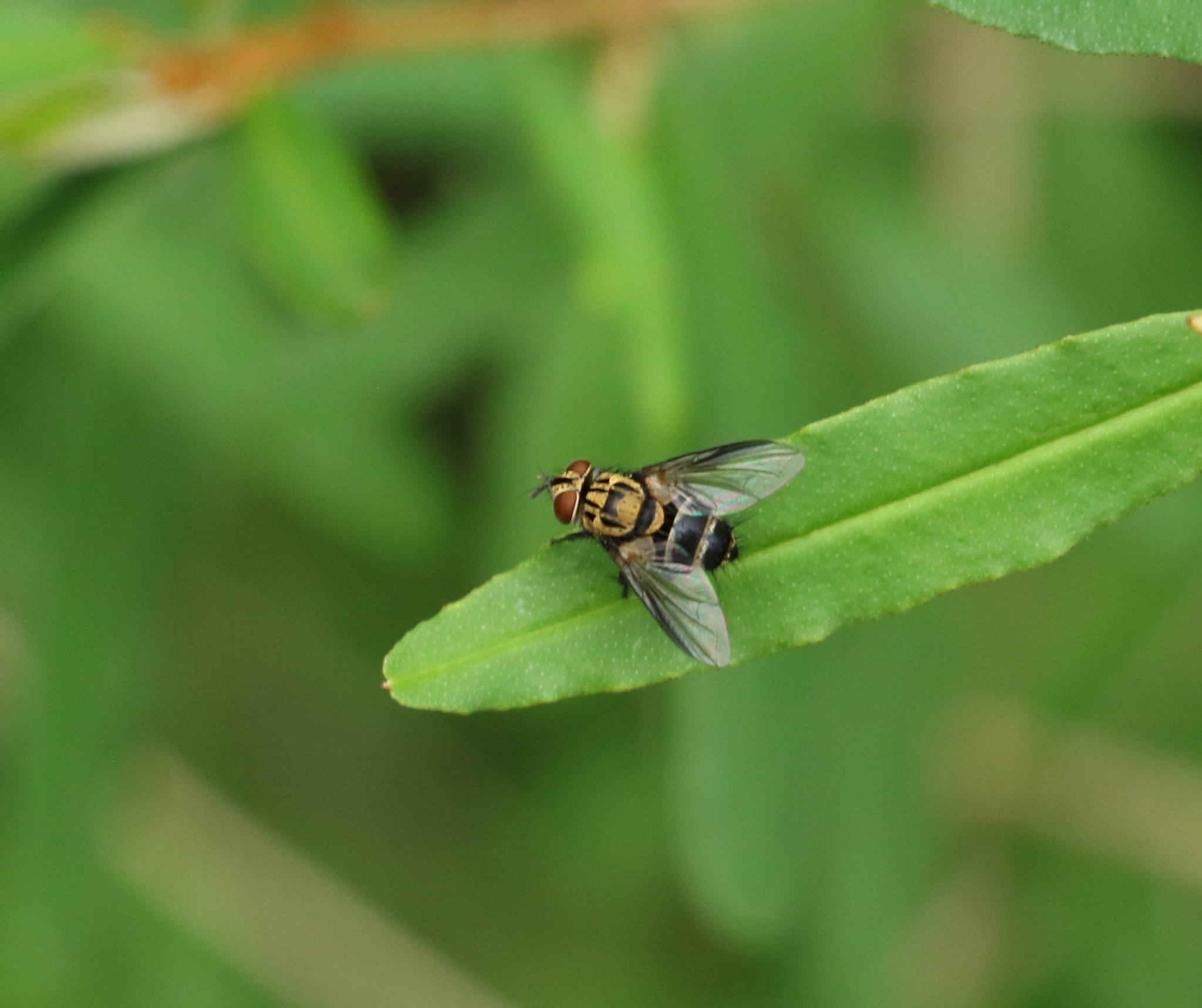
- Calozenillia, Australia

Scientific classification
- Domain: Eukaryota
- Kingdom: Animalia
- Phylum: Arthropoda
- Class: Insecta
- Order: Diptera
- Family: Tachinidae
- Subfamily: Exoristinae
- Tribe: Goniini
- Genus: Calozenillia; Townsend, 1927

Type species
- Calozenillia auronigra Townsend, 1927

Synonyms
- Tamaromyia Mesnil, 1949

= Calozenillia =

Genus of flies

Calozenillia is a genus of parasitic flies in the family Tachinidae. There are about five described species in Calozenillia, found in Africa, east Asia, and Australia.

== Species ==
These five species belong to the genus Calozenillia:

- Calozenillia auronigra Townsend, 1927
- Calozenillia expellens (Walker, 1860)
- Calozenillia olmus (Walker, 1849)
- Calozenillia picta (Curran, 1938)
- Calozenillia tamara (Portschinsky, 1884)
