= Euoestropsis =

Scientific classification
- Kingdom: Animalia
- Phylum: Arthropoda
- Class: Insecta
- Order: Diptera
- Family: Tachinidae
- Subfamily: Tachininae
- Genus: Euoestropsis; Townsend, 1913

Type species
- Euoestropsis viridis (Townsend, 1912

Synonyms
- Oestropsis Townsend, 1912

Genus of flies

Euoestropsis is a genus of flies in the family Tachinidae.

== Species ==
- Euoestropsis viridis (Townsend, 1912)

== Distribution ==
Peru.
