= Trichodischia =

Scientific classification
- Kingdom: Animalia
- Phylum: Arthropoda
- Class: Insecta
- Order: Diptera
- Family: Tachinidae
- Subfamily: Dexiinae
- Tribe: Voriini
- Genus: Trichodischia; Bigot, 1885

Type species
- Trichodischia soror Bigot, 1885

Synonyms
- Trichoraea Cortés, 1974

Genus of flies

Trichodischia is a genus of flies in the family Tachinidae.

== Species ==
- Trichodischia caerulea Bigot, 1885
- Trichodischia soror Bigot, 1885
