= Eggonia =

Scientific classification
- Domain: Eukaryota
- Kingdom: Animalia
- Phylum: Arthropoda
- Class: Insecta
- Order: Diptera
- Family: Tachinidae
- Genus: Eggonia
- Species: E. wulpii

Binomial name
- Eggonia wulpii Townsend, 1927

Genus of flies

Eggonia is a genus of parasitic flies in the family Tachinidae. There is one described species in Eggonia, E. wulpii.
