= Evidomyia =

Scientific classification
- Kingdom: Animalia
- Phylum: Arthropoda
- Clade: Pancrustacea
- Class: Insecta
- Order: Diptera
- Family: Tachinidae
- Subfamily: Tachininae
- Genus: Evidomyia; Reinhard, 1958

Type species
- Evidomyia infida Reinhard, 1958

Genus of flies

Evidomyia is a genus of flies in the family Tachinidae.

== Species ==
- Evidomyia infida Reinhard, 1958

== Distribution ==
United States.
