= Prosopofrontina =

Scientific classification
- Domain: Eukaryota
- Kingdom: Animalia
- Phylum: Arthropoda
- Class: Insecta
- Order: Diptera
- Family: Tachinidae
- Genus: Prosopofrontina; Townsend, 1926

Genus of flies

Prosopofrontina is a genus of parasitic flies in the family Tachinidae. There are about 13 described species in Prosopofrontina.

== Species ==
These 13 species belong to the genus Prosopofrontina:

- Prosopofrontina angustifrons (Townsend, 1928)
- Prosopofrontina bicolor (Villeneuve, 1937)
- Prosopofrontina cerina (Mesnil, 1977)
- Prosopofrontina conifrons (Villeneuve, 1950)
- Prosopofrontina crucigera (Mesnil, 1977)
- Prosopofrontina flava (Curran, 1927)
- Prosopofrontina frontosa (Villeneuve, 1950)
- Prosopofrontina grossa Chao, 1982
- Prosopofrontina latifrons (Mesnil, 1961)
- Prosopofrontina luteipes (Mesnil, 1953)
- Prosopofrontina malaisei (Mesnil, 1961)
- Prosopofrontina pulchra Townsend, 1926
- Prosopofrontina shanxiensis Chao & Liu, 1985
