= Telothyria =

Scientific classification
- Kingdom: Animalia
- Phylum: Arthropoda
- Class: Insecta
- Order: Diptera
- Family: Tachinidae
- Subfamily: Dexiinae
- Tribe: Telothyriini
- Genus: Telothyria; Wulp, 1890

Type species
- Telothyria cupreiventris Wulp, 1890

Synonyms
- Comatacta Coquillett, 1902; Leskiopsis Townsend, 1916; Thelothyria Brauer & von Berganstamm, 1893; Thereuops Brauer & von Berganstamm, 1891; Therevops Aldrich, 1929; Theruops Curran, 1934; Ptilomyoides Curran, 1928; Floradalia Thompson, 1963; Ptilomyia Curran, 1925; Ptilomyiopsis; Euptilomyia Townsend, 1939; Eutelothyria Townsend, 1931

Genus of flies

Telothyria is a genus of flies in the family Tachinidae.

== Species ==
- Telothyria aidani Fleming & Wood, 2020
- Telothyria alexanderi Fleming & Wood, 2020
- Telothyria auranticrus Fleming & Wood, 2020
- Telothyria auriolus Fleming & Wood, 2020
- Telothyria basalis (Wulp, 1890)
- Telothyria bequaerti (Curran, 1925)
- Telothyria bicuspidata Fleming & Wood, 2020
- Telothyria brasiliensis (Townsend, 1929)
- Telothyria carolinacanoae Fleming & Wood, 2020
- Telothyria clavata Fleming & Wood, 2020
- Telothyria cristata Fleming & Wood, 2020
- Telothyria cruenta (Giglio-Tos, 1893)
- Telothyria cupreiventris Wulp, 1890
- Telothyria diniamartinezae Fleming & Wood, 2020
- Telothyria duniagarciae Fleming & Wood, 2020
- Telothyria duvalierbricenoi Fleming & Wood, 2020
- Telothyria eldaarayae Fleming & Wood, 2020
- Telothyria erythropyga Fleming & Wood, 2020
- Telothyria fimbriata Fleming & Wood, 2020
- Telothyria frontalis (Townsend, 1939)
- Telothyria fulgida Fleming & Wood, 2020
- Telothyria gloriasihezarae Fleming & Wood, 2020
- Telothyria grisea Fleming & Wood, 2020
- Telothyria hamata Wulp, 1890
- Telothyria harryramirezi Fleming & Wood, 2020
- Telothyria illucens Wulp, 1890
- Telothyria incisa Fleming & Wood, 2020
- Telothyria insularis (Curran, 1927)
- Telothyria itaquaquecetubae (Townsend, 1931)
- Telothyria major (Thompson, 1963)
- Telothyria manuelpereirai Fleming & Wood, 2020
- Telothyria micropalpus (Curran, 1925)
- Telothyria minor (Thompson, 1963)
- Telothyria nautlana (Townsend, 1908)
- Telothyria obscura Fleming & Wood, 2020
- Telothyria ohrifrons (Wulp, 1890)
- Telothyria omissa Fleming & Wood, 2020
- Telothyria osvaldoespinosai Fleming & Wood, 2020
- Telothyria peltata Fleming & Wood, 2020
- Telothyria placida Wulp, 1890
- Telothyria plumata (Curran, 1925)
- Telothyria relicta Wulp, 1890
- Telothyria ricardocaleroi Fleming & Wood, 2020
- Telothyria rufostriata Wulp, 1890
- Telothyria schineri Fleming & Wood, 2020
- Telothyria trinitatis (Thompson, 1963)
- Telothyria variegata (Fabricius, 1805)
