= Minthodexiopsis =

Scientific classification
- Domain: Eukaryota
- Kingdom: Animalia
- Phylum: Arthropoda
- Class: Insecta
- Order: Diptera
- Family: Tachinidae
- Genus: Minthodexiopsis; Townsend, 1927

Genus of flies

Minthodexiopsis is a genus of parasitic flies in the family Tachinidae.
