= Parabothria =

Scientific classification
- Domain: Eukaryota
- Kingdom: Animalia
- Phylum: Arthropoda
- Class: Insecta
- Order: Diptera
- Family: Tachinidae
- Genus: Parabothria; Vimmer & Soukup, 1940
- Species: P. punoensis

Binomial name
- Parabothria punoensis Vimmer & Soukup, 1940

Genus of flies

Parabothria is a genus of parasitic flies in the family Tachinidae. There is one described species in Parabothria, P. punoensis.
