= Neoargyrophylax =

Scientific classification
- Domain: Eukaryota
- Kingdom: Animalia
- Phylum: Arthropoda
- Class: Insecta
- Order: Diptera
- Family: Tachinidae
- Genus: Neoargyrophylax
- Species: N. argentescens

Binomial name
- Neoargyrophylax argentescens Townsend

Genus of flies

Neoargyrophylax is a genus of parasitic flies in the family Tachinidae. There is one described species in Neoargyrophylax, N. argentescens.
