= Glossidionophora =

Scientific classification
- Kingdom: Animalia
- Phylum: Arthropoda
- Class: Insecta
- Order: Diptera
- Family: Tachinidae
- Genus: Glossidionophora; Bigot, 1885
- Species: G. nigra

Binomial name
- Glossidionophora nigra Bigot, 1885

Genus of flies

Glossidionophora is a genus of parasitic flies in the family Tachinidae. There is one described species in Glossidionophora, G. nigra.
