= Zambesa =

Scientific classification
- Kingdom: Animalia
- Phylum: Arthropoda
- Class: Insecta
- Order: Diptera
- Family: Tachinidae
- Subfamily: Tachininae
- Genus: Zambesa; Walker, 1856

Type species
- Zambesa ocypteroides Walker, 1856

Synonyms
- Zambesopsis Townsend, 1933; Zambeza Bigot, 1892

Genus of flies

Zambesa is a genus of flies in the family Tachinidae.

== Species ==
- Zambesa claripalpis Villeneuve, 1926
- Zambesa ocypteroides Walker, 1856
- Zambesa walkeri Doleschall, 1858
