= Eleuthromyia =

Scientific classification
- Kingdom: Animalia
- Phylum: Arthropoda
- Class: Insecta
- Order: Diptera
- Family: Tachinidae
- Subfamily: Phasiinae
- Tribe: Cylindromyiini
- Genus: Eleuthromyia; Reinhard, 1964

Type species
- Eleuthromyia inusitata Reinhard, 1964

Genus of flies

Eleuthromyia is a genus of flies in the family Tachinidae.

== Species ==
- Eleuthromyia inusitata Reinhard, 1964

== Distribution ==
Mexico.
