= Hyphantrophaga =

Scientific classification
- Kingdom: Animalia
- Phylum: Arthropoda
- Class: Insecta
- Order: Diptera
- Family: Tachinidae
- Subfamily: Exoristinae
- Tribe: Goniini
- Genus: Hyphantrophaga; Townsend, 1892

Type species
- Meigenia hyphantriae Townsend, 1892

Synonyms
- Eusisyropa Townsend, 1908; Ophirosturmia Townsend, 1911; Ophiosturmia Vimmer & Soukup, 1940; Brachymasicera Townsend, 1911; Ommasicera Townsend, 1911; Oomasicera Guimarães, 1971; Patillalia Curran, 1934; Ypophaemyiops Townsend, 1935

Genus of flies

Hyphantrophaga is a genus of flies in the family Tachinidae.

== Species ==
- Hyphantrophaga adamsoni (Thompson, 1963)
- Hyphantrophaga adrianguadamuzi Fleming & Wood, 2019
- Hyphantrophaga albopilosa Fleming & Wood, 2019
- Hyphantrophaga anacordobae Fleming & Wood, 2019
- Hyphantrophaga auratofrontalis (Brèthes, 1908)
- Hyphantrophaga autographae (Sellers, 1943)
- Hyphantrophaga blandita (Coquillett, 1897)
- Hyphantrophaga blandoides (Thompson, 1963)
- Hyphantrophaga calixtomoragai Fleming & Wood, 2019
- Hyphantrophaga calva Fleming & Wood, 2019
- Hyphantrophaga chaetosa (Townsend, 1911)
- Hyphantrophaga cincta (Townsend, 1911)
- Hyphantrophaga ciriloumanai Fleming & Wood, 2019
- Hyphantrophaga collina (Reinhard, 1944)
- Hyphantrophaga danousophaga Fleming & Wood, 2019
- Hyphantrophaga desmiae (Sellers, 1943)
- Hyphantrophaga diniamartinezae Fleming & Wood, 2019
- Hyphantrophaga duniagarciae Fleming & Wood, 2019
- Hyphantrophaga edwinapui Fleming & Wood, 2019
- Hyphantrophaga eldaarayae Fleming & Wood, 2019
- Hyphantrophaga eliethcantillanoae Fleming & Wood, 2019
- Hyphantrophaga euchaetiae (Sellers, 1943)
- Hyphantrophaga fasciata (Curran, 1934)
- Hyphantrophaga gilbertthampiei Fleming & Wood, 2019
- Hyphantrophaga gowdeyi (Curran, 1926)
- Hyphantrophaga guillermopereirai Fleming & Wood, 2019
- Hyphantrophaga hazelcambroneroae Fleming & Wood, 2019
- Hyphantrophaga hyphantriae (Townsend, 1891)
- Hyphantrophaga luciariosae Fleming & Wood, 2019
- Hyphantrophaga manuelriosi Fleming & Wood, 2019
- Hyphantrophaga morphophaga Fleming & Wood, 2019
- Hyphantrophaga myersi (Aldrich, 1933)
- Hyphantrophaga nigricauda Fleming & Wood, 2019
- Hyphantrophaga nigripes (Townsend, 1928)
- Hyphantrophaga optica (Schiner, 1868)
- Hyphantrophaga osvaldoespinozai Fleming & Wood, 2019
- Hyphantrophaga pabloumanai Fleming & Wood, 2019
- Hyphantrophaga polita (Townsend, 1911)
- Hyphantrophaga scolex (Reinhard, 1953)
- Hyphantrophaga sellersi (Sabrosky, 1983)
- Hyphantrophaga similis Fleming & Wood, 2019
- Hyphantrophaga subpolita (Townsend, 1912)
- Hyphantrophaga tucumanensis (Sellers, 1943)
- Hyphantrophaga virilis (Aldrich & Webber, 1924)
