= Amicrotrichomma =

Scientific classification
- Kingdom: Animalia
- Phylum: Arthropoda
- Class: Insecta
- Order: Diptera
- Family: Tachinidae
- Subfamily: Tachininae
- Tribe: Tachinini
- Genus: Amicrotrichomma; Townsend, 1927

Type species
- Amicrotrichomma orbitalis Townsend, 1927

Genus of flies

Amicrotrichomma is a genus of flies in the family Tachinidae.

== Species ==
- Amicrotrichomma ada Curran, 1947
- Amicrotrichomma orbitalis Townsend, 1927

== Distribution ==
Brazil.
