= Prolophosia =

Scientific classification
- Domain: Eukaryota
- Kingdom: Animalia
- Phylum: Arthropoda
- Class: Insecta
- Order: Diptera
- Family: Tachinidae
- Genus: Prolophosia; Townsend, 1932
- Species: P. petiolata

Binomial name
- Prolophosia petiolata Townsend, 1933

Genus of flies

Prolophosia is a genus of parasitic flies in the family Tachinidae. There is one described species in Prolophosia, P. petiolata.
