= Compsiluroides =

Scientific classification
- Kingdom: Animalia
- Phylum: Arthropoda
- Class: Insecta
- Order: Diptera
- Family: Tachinidae
- Subfamily: Exoristinae
- Tribe: Blondeliini
- Genus: Compsiluroides; Mesnil, 1953

Type species
- Compsiluroides communis Mesnil, 1953

Genus of flies

Compsiluroides is a genus of flies in the family Tachinidae.

== Species ==
- Compsiluroides communis Mesnil, 1953
- Compsiluroides flavipalpis Mesnil, 1957
- Compsiluroides proboscis Chao & Sun, 1992
