= Hypertrophocera =

Scientific classification
- Kingdom: Animalia
- Phylum: Arthropoda
- Class: Insecta
- Order: Diptera
- Family: Tachinidae
- Subfamily: Tachininae
- Genus: Hypertrophocera; Townsend, 1891

Type species
- Hypertrophocera parvipes Townsend, 1891

Synonyms
- Euthyprosopa Townsend, 1892; Neotractocera Townsend, 1892

Genus of flies

Hypertrophocera is a genus of flies in the family Tachinidae.

== Species ==
- Hypertrophocera parvipes Townsend, 1891

== Distribution ==
United States, Mexico.
