= Sorochemyia =

Scientific classification
- Domain: Eukaryota
- Kingdom: Animalia
- Phylum: Arthropoda
- Class: Insecta
- Order: Diptera
- Family: Tachinidae
- Genus: Sorochemyia; Townsend, 1915
- Species: S. oroya

Binomial name
- Sorochemyia oroya Townsend, 1915

Genus of flies

Sorochemyia is a genus of parasitic flies in the family Tachinidae. There is one described species in Sorochemyia, S. oroya.
