= Rhinomacquartia =

Scientific classification
- Kingdom: Animalia
- Phylum: Arthropoda
- Class: Insecta
- Order: Diptera
- Family: Tachinidae
- Subfamily: Exoristinae
- Genus: Rhinomacquartia; Brauer & von Berganstamm, 1891

Type species
- Rhinomacquartia chaetophora Brauer & von Berganstamm, 1891

Genus of flies

Rhinomacquartia is a genus of flies in the family Tachinidae.

== Species ==
- Rhinomacquartia chaetophora Brauer & von Berganstamm, 1891

== Distribution ==
Brazil.
