= Oligooestrus =

Scientific classification
- Kingdom: Animalia
- Phylum: Arthropoda
- Class: Insecta
- Order: Diptera
- Family: Tachinidae
- Subfamily: Tachininae
- Genus: Oligooestrus; Townsend, 1932

Type species
- Oligooestrus oestroideus Townsend, 1932

Synonyms
- Oligoestrus Guimarães, 1971

Genus of flies

Oligooestrus is a genus of flies in the family Tachinidae.

== Species ==
- Oligooestrus oestroideus Townsend, 1932

== Distribution ==
Argentina, Chile.
