= Clinogaster =

Scientific classification
- Kingdom: Animalia
- Phylum: Arthropoda
- Class: Insecta
- Order: Diptera
- Family: Tachinidae
- Subfamily: Phasiinae
- Tribe: Cylindromyiini
- Genus: Clinogaster; Wulp, 1892

Type species
- Clinogaster notabilis Wulp, 1892

Genus of flies

Clinogaster is a genus of flies in the family Tachinidae.

== Species ==
- Clinogaster notabilis Wulp, 1892

== Distribution ==
Mexico.
