= Procleonice =

Scientific classification
- Domain: Eukaryota
- Kingdom: Animalia
- Phylum: Arthropoda
- Class: Insecta
- Order: Diptera
- Family: Tachinidae
- Genus: Procleonice; Townsend, 1935
- Species: P. prolixa

Binomial name
- Procleonice prolixa Townsend, 1935

Genus of flies

Procleonice is a genus of parasitic flies in the family Tachinidae. There is one described species in Procleonice, P. prolixa.
