= Anaeudora =

Scientific classification
- Domain: Eukaryota
- Kingdom: Animalia
- Phylum: Arthropoda
- Class: Insecta
- Order: Diptera
- Family: Tachinidae
- Genus: Anaeudora

Genus of insects

Anaeudora is a genus of bristle flies in the family Tachinidae. There are at least two described species in Anaeudora.

== Species ==
These two species belong to the genus Anaeudora:

- Anaeudora apicalis (Matsumura, 1916)^{c g}
- Anaeudora japanica (Baranov, 1935)^{c g}

Data sources: i = ITIS, c = Catalogue of Life, g = GBIF, b = Bugguide.net
