= Bolbocheta =

Scientific classification
- Kingdom: Animalia
- Phylum: Arthropoda
- Clade: Pancrustacea
- Class: Insecta
- Order: Diptera
- Family: Tachinidae
- Subfamily: Tachininae
- Genus: Bolbocheta; Bigot, 1885

Synonyms
- Bolbodocheta Bigot, 1885; Bolbochaeta Carus, 1885; Bolbochaeta Guimarães, 1971

Genus of flies

Bolbocheta is a genus of flies in the family Tachinidae.

== Species ==
- Bolbocheta haustellata Bigot, 1885

== Distribution ==
Argentina.
