= Palpolinnaemyia =

Scientific classification
- Kingdom: Animalia
- Phylum: Arthropoda
- Class: Insecta
- Order: Diptera
- Family: Tachinidae
- Genus: Palpolinnaemyia; Townsend, 1927
- Species: P. perorbitalis

Binomial name
- Palpolinnaemyia perorbitalis Townsend, 1927

Genus of flies

Palpolinnaemyia is a genus of parasitic flies in the family Tachinidae. There is one described species in Palpolinnaemyia, P. perorbitalis.
