= Mesnilomyia =

Scientific classification
- Domain: Eukaryota
- Kingdom: Animalia
- Phylum: Arthropoda
- Class: Insecta
- Order: Diptera
- Family: Tachinidae
- Genus: Mesnilomyia; Kugler, 1972

Genus of flies

Mesnilomyia is a genus of parasitic flies in the family Tachinidae. There are about six described species in Mesnilomyia.

== Species ==
These six species belong to the genus Mesnilomyia:

- Mesnilomyia achilleae Kugler, 1972
- Mesnilomyia calyptrata Zeegers, 2007
- Mesnilomyia longicornis Kugler, 1972
- Mesnilomyia magnifica Kugler, 1972
- Mesnilomyia rufipes Zeegers, 2007
- Mesnilomyia subaperta Herting, 1983
