= Xanthobasis =

Scientific classification
- Kingdom: Animalia
- Phylum: Arthropoda
- Class: Insecta
- Order: Diptera
- Family: Tachinidae
- Subfamily: Tachininae
- Tribe: Palpostomatini
- Genus: Xanthobasis; Aldrich, 1934

Type species
- Xanthobasis angustifrons Aldrich, 1934

Synonyms
- Proxanthobasis Blanchard, 1966

Genus of flies

Xanthobasis is a genus of flies in the family Tachinidae.

== Species ==
- Xanthobasis aldrichi (Blanchard, 1966)
- Xanthobasis angustifrons Aldrich, 1934
- Xanthobasis neopollinosa Blanchard, 1966
- Xanthobasis pollinosa Aldrich, 1934
- Xanthobasis rufescens (Blanchard, 1966)
- Xanthobasis rufipes (Blanchard, 1966)
- Xanthobasis unicolor Aldrich, 1934
