= Chromoepalpus =

Scientific classification
- Kingdom: Animalia
- Phylum: Arthropoda
- Class: Insecta
- Order: Diptera
- Family: Tachinidae
- Subfamily: Tachininae
- Tribe: Tachinini
- Genus: Chromoepalpus; Townsend, 1914

Type species
- Chromoepalpus uruhuasi Townsend, 1914

Genus of flies

Chromoepalpus is a genus of flies in the family Tachinidae. It is found in Peru.

== Species ==
- Chromoepalpus uruhuasi Townsend, 1914
