= Turanogonia =

Scientific classification
- Domain: Eukaryota
- Kingdom: Animalia
- Phylum: Arthropoda
- Class: Insecta
- Order: Diptera
- Family: Tachinidae
- Genus: Turanogonia; Rohdendorf, 1924

Genus of flies

Turanogonia is a genus of parasitic flies in the family Tachinidae. There are at least four described species in Turanogonia.

== Species ==
These four species belong to the genus Turanogonia:

- Turanogonia chinensis (Wiedemann, 1824)
- Turanogonia kalimpongensis Das, 1993
- Turanogonia klapperichi Mesnil, 1956
- Turanogonia timorensis (Robineau-Desvoidy, 1830)
