= Degeeriopsis =

Scientific classification
- Kingdom: Animalia
- Phylum: Arthropoda
- Class: Insecta
- Order: Diptera
- Family: Tachinidae
- Subfamily: Exoristinae
- Tribe: Blondeliini
- Genus: Degeeriopsis; Mesnil, 1953

Type species
- Degeeriopsis xanthogastra Mesnil, 1953

Genus of flies

Degeeriopsis is a genus of flies in the family Tachinidae.

== Species ==
- Degeeriopsis apocola Shima, 1997
- Degeeriopsis xanthogastra Mesnil, 1953
