= Tetragimyia =

Tetragimyia minor

Scientific classification
- Kingdom: Animalia
- Phylum: Arthropoda
- Class: Insecta
- Order: Diptera
- Family: Tachinidae
- Genus: Tetragimyia; Shima & Takahashi, 2011
- Species: T. minor

Binomial name
- Tetragimyia minor Shima & Takahashi, 2011

Monotypic fly genus

Tetragimyia minor is a species of fly in the family Tachinidae, the only species in the genus Tetragimyia.
