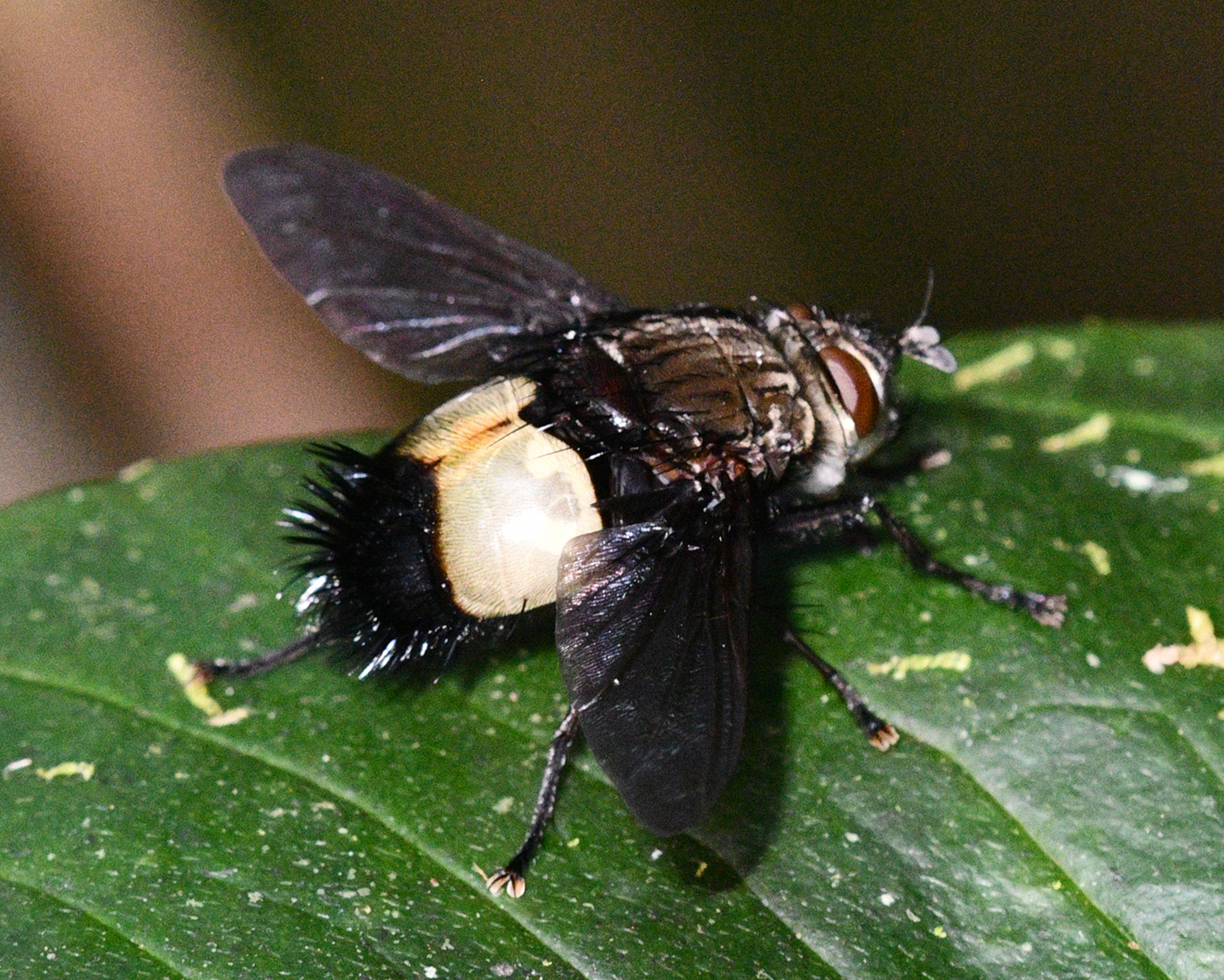

Scientific classification
- Kingdom: Animalia
- Phylum: Arthropoda
- Clade: Pancrustacea
- Class: Insecta
- Order: Diptera
- Family: Tachinidae
- Genus: Euepalpus; Townsend, 1908

= Euepalpus =

Genus of flies

Euepalpus is a genus of parasitic flies in the family Tachinidae. There are at least two described species in the genus Euepalpus.

== Species ==
These two species belong to the genus Euepalpus:

- Euepalpus flavicauda Townsend, 1908
- Euepalpus vestitus (Townsend, 1916)
