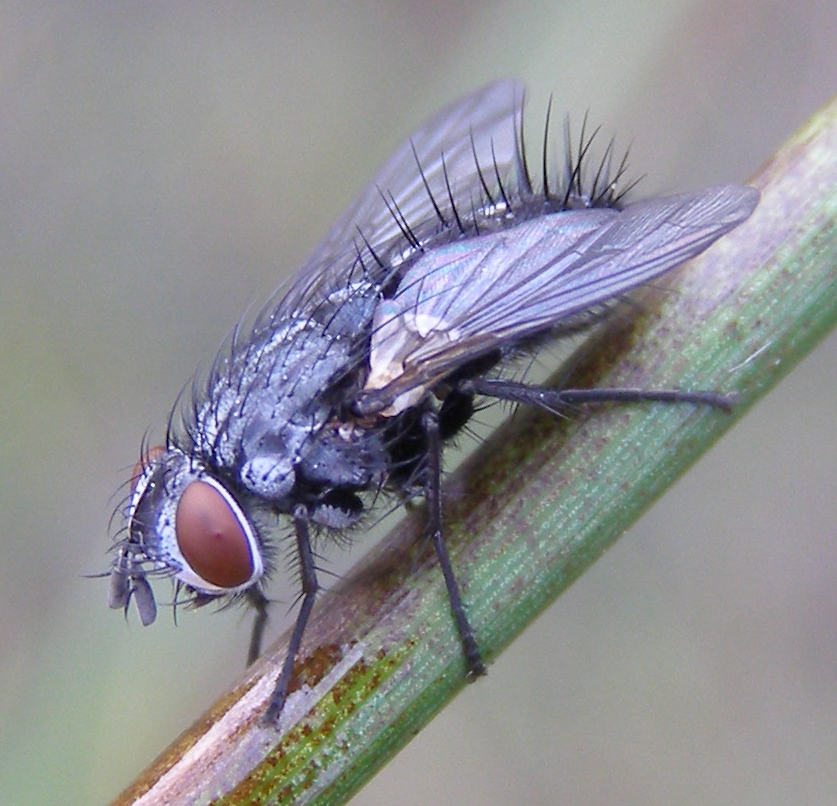
- Lydella sp.

Scientific classification
- Kingdom: Animalia
- Phylum: Arthropoda
- Clade: Pancrustacea
- Class: Insecta
- Order: Diptera
- Family: Tachinidae
- Subfamily: Exoristinae
- Tribe: Eryciini
- Genus: Lydella; Robineau-Desvoidy, 1830

Type species
- Lydella grisescens Robineau-Desvoidy, 1830

Synonyms
- Diatraeophaga Townsend, 1916; Leptotachina Brauer & von Berganstamm, 1891; Lidella De Galdo, 1856; Lidella Rondani, 1859; Lydelloxenis Mesnil, 1956; Metagonistylum Townsend, 1927; Metoposisyrops Townsend, 1916; Paraphorocera Brauer & von Berganstamm, 1889; Zorella Robineau-Desvoidy, 1863

= Lydella =

Genus of flies

Lydella is a genus of flies in the family Tachinidae. Lydella thompsoni can be used in the UK for the biological control of the European corn borer.

== Species ==
- Lydella acellaris Chao & Shi, 1982
- Lydella adiscalis Chao, 1982
- Lydella breviseria (Pandellé, 1896)
- Lydella columbina Richter, 1976
- Lydella deckeri (Curran, 1929)
- Lydella gannanensis Liu, Zhang & Xi, 2023
- Lydella grisescens Robineau-Desvoidy, 1830
- Lydella jalisco Woodley, 1994
- Lydella lacustris Herting, 1959
- Lydella matutina Richter, 2003
- Lydella minense (Townsend, 1927)
- Lydella oryzae (Townsend, 1916)
- Lydella parasitica Mesnil, 1959
- Lydella radicis (Townsend, 1916)
- Lydella ripae (Brischke, 1885)
- Lydella scirpophagae (Chao & Shi, 1982)
- Lydella sesamiae (Mesnil, 1968)
- Lydella stabulans (Meigen, 1824)
- Lydella striatalis (Townsend, 1916)
- Lydella thompsoni Herting, 1959
