= Graphia =

Scientific classification
- Domain: Eukaryota
- Kingdom: Animalia
- Phylum: Arthropoda
- Class: Insecta
- Order: Diptera
- Family: Tachinidae
- Genus: Graphia; Wulp, 1885
- Species: G. strigosa

Binomial name
- Graphia strigosa Wulp, 1885

Genus of flies

Graphia is a genus of parasitic flies in the family Tachinidae. There is one described species in Graphia, G. strigosa.
