= Conopomima =

Scientific classification
- Kingdom: Animalia
- Phylum: Arthropoda
- Class: Insecta
- Order: Diptera
- Family: Tachinidae
- Subfamily: Phasiinae
- Tribe: Cylindromyiini
- Genus: Conopomima; Mesnil, 1978

Type species
- Conopomima bisetosa Mesnil, 1978

Genus of flies

Conopomima is a genus of flies in the family Tachinidae.

== Species ==
- Conopomima bisetosa Mesnil, 1978

== Distribution ==
Madagascar.
