= Marnefia =

Scientific classification
- Domain: Eukaryota
- Kingdom: Animalia
- Phylum: Arthropoda
- Class: Insecta
- Order: Diptera
- Family: Tachinidae
- Genus: Marnefia
- Species: M. mirifica

Binomial name
- Marnefia mirifica Cortes, 1982

Genus of flies

Marnefia is a genus of parasitic flies in the family Tachinidae. There is one described species in Marnefia, M. mirifica.
