= Neotryphera =

Scientific classification
- Kingdom: Animalia
- Phylum: Arthropoda
- Clade: Pancrustacea
- Class: Insecta
- Order: Diptera
- Family: Tachinidae
- Subfamily: Tachininae
- Genus: Neotryphera; Malloch, 1938

Type species
- Neotryphera atra Malloch, 1938

Genus of flies

Neotryphera is a genus of flies in the family Tachinidae.

== Species ==
- Neotryphera atra Malloch, 1938

== Distribution ==
New Zealand.
