= Oestrohystricia =

Scientific classification
- Kingdom: Animalia
- Phylum: Arthropoda
- Class: Insecta
- Order: Diptera
- Superfamily: Oestroidea
- Family: Tachinidae
- Genus: Oestrohystricia; Townsend, 1912

Type species
- Oestrohystricia subalpina Townsend, 1912

Genus of flies

Oestrohystricia is a genus of flies in the family Tachinidae.

== Species ==
- Oestrohystricia subalpina Townsend, 1912

== Distribution ==
Peru
