= Dexiomera =

Scientific classification
- Domain: Eukaryota
- Kingdom: Animalia
- Phylum: Arthropoda
- Class: Insecta
- Order: Diptera
- Family: Tachinidae
- Genus: Dexiomera

Genus of flies

Dexiomera is a genus of bristle flies in the family Tachinidae. There is at least one described species in Dexiomera, D. surda.
