= Trischidocera =

Scientific classification
- Kingdom: Animalia
- Phylum: Arthropoda
- Class: Insecta
- Order: Diptera
- Family: Tachinidae
- Subfamily: incertae sedis
- Genus: Trischidocera; Villeneuve, 1915

Type species
- Trischidocera sauteri Villeneuve, 1915

Genus of flies

Trischidocera is a genus of flies in the family Tachinidae. The genus is currently unplaced within Tachinidae according to Silvo S. Nihei (2015); it had previously been placed in tribes such as Germariini and Ormiini.

== Species ==
- Trischidocera sauteri Villeneuve, 1915
- Trischidocera yunnanensis Chao & Zhou, 1987
