= Andinomyia =

Scientific classification
- Domain: Eukaryota
- Kingdom: Animalia
- Phylum: Arthropoda
- Class: Insecta
- Order: Diptera
- Family: Tachinidae
- Genus: Andinomyia

Genus of flies

Andinomyia is a genus of bristle flies in the family Tachinidae. There are about five described species in Andinomyia.

== Species ==
These five species belong to the genus Andinomyia:

- Andinomyia complanata (Vimmer & Soukup, 1940)^{c g}
- Andinomyia cruciata Townsend, 1912^{c g}
- Andinomyia nigra Vimmer & Soukup, 1940^{c g}
- Andinomyia rufomaculata Vimmer & Soukup, 1940^{c g}
- Andinomyia townsendi (Vimmer & Soukup, 1940)^{c g}

Data sources: i = ITIS, c = Catalogue of Life, g = GBIF, b = Bugguide.net
