= Pronemorilla =

Scientific classification
- Domain: Eukaryota
- Kingdom: Animalia
- Phylum: Arthropoda
- Class: Insecta
- Order: Diptera
- Family: Tachinidae
- Genus: Pronemorilla; Townsend, 1935
- Species: P. mima

Binomial name
- Pronemorilla mima Townsend, 1935

Genus of flies

Pronemorilla is a genus of parasitic flies in the family Tachinidae. There is one described species in Pronemorilla, P. mima.
