= Takanomyia =

Scientific classification
- Kingdom: Animalia
- Phylum: Arthropoda
- Class: Insecta
- Order: Diptera
- Family: Tachinidae
- Subfamily: Exoristinae
- Tribe: Goniini
- Genus: Takanomyia; Mesnil, 1957

Type species
- Takanomyia scutellata Mesnil, 1957

Synonyms
- Isopexopsis Sun & Chao, 1994

Genus of flies

Takanomyia is a genus of flies in the family Tachinidae.

== Species ==
- Takanomyia antennalis Shima, 1988
- Takanomyia basalis Shima, 1988
- Takanomyia frontalis Shima, 1988
- Takanomyia parafacialis Sun & Chao, 1994
- Takanomyia rava Shima, 1988
- Takanomyia scutellata Mesnil, 1957
- Takanomyia takagii Shima, 1988
