= Eucoronimyia =

Scientific classification
- Kingdom: Animalia
- Phylum: Arthropoda
- Class: Insecta
- Order: Diptera
- Family: Tachinidae
- Subfamily: Tachininae
- Genus: Eucoronimyia; Townsend, 1908

Type species
- Isoglossa hastata Coquillett, 1895

Synonyms
- Eucoronomyia Curran, 1934; Isoglossa Coquillett, 1895

Genus of flies

Eucoronimyia is a genus of flies in the family Tachinidae.

== Species ==
- Eucoronimyia hastata (Coquillett, 1895)

== Distribution ==
United States.
