= Parabrachycoma =

Scientific classification
- Domain: Eukaryota
- Kingdom: Animalia
- Phylum: Arthropoda
- Class: Insecta
- Order: Diptera
- Family: Tachinidae
- Genus: Parabrachycoma; Blanchard, 1940
- Species: P. ruficauda

Binomial name
- Parabrachycoma ruficauda Blanchard, 1940

Genus of flies

Parabrachycoma is a genus of parasitic flies in the family Tachinidae. There is one described species in Parabrachycoma, P. ruficauda.
