= Gaediopsis =

Scientific classification
- Kingdom: Animalia
- Phylum: Arthropoda
- Clade: Pancrustacea
- Class: Insecta
- Order: Diptera
- Family: Tachinidae
- Subfamily: Exoristinae
- Tribe: Goniini
- Genus: Gaediopsis; Brauer & von Berganstamm, 1891

Type species
- Gaediopsis mexicana Brauer & von Berganstamm, 1891

Synonyms
- Goediopsis Vimmer & Soukup, 1940; Goegaediopsis Vimmer & Soukup, 1940; Gaediophana Brauer & von Bergenstamm, 1893; Gaudiophana Townsend, 1927; Poliophrys Townsend, 1908; Eugaediopsis Townsend, 1916; Chaetogaediopsis Townsend, 1916; Eugaedia Townsend, 1916

Genus of flies

Gaediopsis is a genus of flies in the family Tachinidae.

== Species ==
- Gaediopsis flavicauda (Wulp, 1890)
- Gaediopsis flavipes Coquillett, 1895
- Gaediopsis lugubris (Wulp, 1890)
- Gaediopsis mexicana Brauer & von Berganstamm, 1891
- Gaediopsis ocellaris Coquillett, 1902
- Gaediopsis organensis (Townsend, 1908)
- Gaediopsis punoensis Vimmer & Soukup, 1940
- Gaediopsis rubentis (Reinhard, 1961)
- Gaediopsis rufescens Aldrich, 1929
- Gaediopsis setosa Coquillett, 1897
- Gaediopsis sierricola (Townsend, 1908)
- Gaediopsis simmondsi (Thompson, 1963)
- Gaediopsis vinnula (Reinhard, 1961)
