= Perumyia =

Scientific classification
- Kingdom: Animalia
- Phylum: Arthropoda
- Class: Insecta
- Order: Diptera
- Family: Tachinidae
- Subfamily: Tachininae
- Genus: Perumyia; Arnaud, 1963

Type species
- Perumyia embiaphaga Arnaud, 1963

Genus of flies

Perumyia is a genus of flies in the family Tachinidae.

== Species ==
- Perumyia embiaphaga Arnaud, 1963

== Distribution ==
Peru.
