= Hemisturmiella =

Scientific classification
- Domain: Eukaryota
- Kingdom: Animalia
- Phylum: Arthropoda
- Class: Insecta
- Order: Diptera
- Family: Tachinidae
- Genus: Hemisturmiella; Guimarães, 1983
- Species: H. brasiliana

Binomial name
- Hemisturmiella brasiliana Guimaraes, 1983

Genus of flies

Hemisturmiella is a genus of parasitic flies in the family Tachinidae. There is one described species in Hemisturmiella, H. brasiliana.
