= Xeoprosopa =

Scientific classification
- Domain: Eukaryota
- Kingdom: Animalia
- Phylum: Arthropoda
- Class: Insecta
- Order: Diptera
- Family: Tachinidae
- Genus: Xeoprosopa; Townsend, 1919
- Species: X. uruhuasi

Binomial name
- Xeoprosopa uruhuasi Townsend, 1919

Genus of flies

Xeoprosopa is a genus of parasitic flies in the family Tachinidae. There is one described species in Xeoprosopa, X. uruhuasi.
