= Tromodesiana =

Scientific classification
- Domain: Eukaryota
- Kingdom: Animalia
- Phylum: Arthropoda
- Class: Insecta
- Order: Diptera
- Family: Tachinidae
- Genus: Tromodesiana; Townsend, 1931
- Species: T. thomae

Binomial name
- Tromodesiana thomae Wiedemann, 1830

Genus of flies

Tromodesiana is a genus of parasitic flies in the family Tachinidae. There is one described species in Tromodesiana, T. thomae.
