= Impeccantia =

Scientific classification
- Kingdom: Animalia
- Phylum: Arthropoda
- Class: Insecta
- Order: Diptera
- Family: Tachinidae
- Subfamily: Tachininae
- Genus: Impeccantia; Reinhard, 1961

Type species
- Impeccantia claterna Reinhard, 1961

Genus of flies

Impeccantia is a genus of flies in the family Tachinidae.

== Species ==
- Impeccantia claterna Reinhard, 1961

== Distribution ==
United States.
