= Metadrinomyia =

Scientific classification
- Domain: Eukaryota
- Kingdom: Animalia
- Phylum: Arthropoda
- Class: Insecta
- Order: Diptera
- Family: Tachinidae
- Genus: Metadrinomyia; Shima, 1980

Genus of flies

Metadrinomyia is a genus of parasitic flies in the family Tachinidae. There are at least four described species in Metadrinomyia.

== Species ==
These four species belong to the genus Metadrinomyia:

- Metadrinomyia argentea Shima, 1980
- Metadrinomyia flavifrons
- Metadrinomyia proclinata Shima, 1980
- Metadrinomyia xanthokolos
