= Eucorpulentosoma =

Scientific classification
- Domain: Eukaryota
- Kingdom: Animalia
- Phylum: Arthropoda
- Class: Insecta
- Order: Diptera
- Family: Tachinidae
- Genus: Eucorpulentosoma; Townsend, 1914
- Species: E. simile

Binomial name
- Eucorpulentosoma simile Townsend, 1914

Genus of flies

Eucorpulentosoma is a genus of parasitic flies in the family Tachinidae. There is one described species in Eucorpulentosoma, E. simile.
