= Spiniabdomina =

Scientific classification
- Domain: Eukaryota
- Kingdom: Animalia
- Phylum: Arthropoda
- Class: Insecta
- Order: Diptera
- Family: Tachinidae
- Genus: Spiniabdomina; Shi, 1991
- Species: S. flava

Binomial name
- Spiniabdomina flava Shi & Y, 1991

Genus of flies

Spiniabdomina is a genus of parasitic flies in the family Tachinidae. There is one described species in Spiniabdomina, S. flava.
