= Paragonia =

Paragonia may refer to:

- A fictional South American country, setting of the 1916 film The Americano
- Paragonia (fly), a genus of flies
- Paragonia (plant), a genus of flowering plants
