= Pseudalsomyia piligena =

Scientific classification
- Kingdom: Animalia
- Phylum: Arthropoda
- Class: Insecta
- Order: Diptera
- Family: Tachinidae
- Subfamily: Exoristinae
- Tribe: Goniini
- Genus: Pseudalsomyia
- Species: P. piligena

Binomial name
- Pseudalsomyia piligena Mesnil, 1968

Species of fly

Pseudalsomyia piligena is a genus of flies in the family Tachinidae.

== Distribution ==
Pakistan
