= Cadurcia casta =

Scientific classification
- Kingdom: Animalia
- Phylum: Arthropoda
- Class: Insecta
- Order: Diptera
- Family: Tachinidae
- Subfamily: Exoristinae
- Tribe: Goniini
- Genus: Cadurcia
- Species: C. casta

Binomial name
- Cadurcia casta (Rondani, 1861)

Synonyms
- Masicera casta Rondani, 1861

Species of fly

Cadurcia casta is a species of fly in the family Tachinidae.

== Distribution ==
Romania, Croatia, Italy, Serbia, Turkey, France, Armenia, Azerbaijan.
