= Coscaronia atrogonia =

Scientific classification
- Kingdom: Animalia
- Phylum: Arthropoda
- Class: Insecta
- Order: Diptera
- Family: Tachinidae
- Subfamily: Exoristinae
- Tribe: Goniini
- Genus: Coscaronia
- Species: C. atrogonia

Binomial name
- Coscaronia atrogonia Cortés, 1979

Species of fly

Coscaronia atrogonia is a species of bristle fly in the family Tachinidae.

== Distribution ==
Argentina.
