= Masistylum arcuatum =

Scientific classification
- Kingdom: Animalia
- Phylum: Arthropoda
- Class: Insecta
- Order: Diptera
- Family: Tachinidae
- Subfamily: Exoristinae
- Tribe: Goniini
- Genus: Masistylum
- Species: M. arcuatum

Binomial name
- Masistylum arcuatum (Mik, 1863)

Synonyms
- Demoticus nigricans Rondani, 1865; Pachystylum arcuatum Mik, 1863

Species of flies

Masistylum arcuatum is a species of parasitic flies in the family Tachinidae.

== Distribution ==
Poland, Romania, Slovakia, Ukraine, Andorra, Italy, Spain, Austria, France, Switzerland, Russia
