= Hebia flavipes =

Scientific classification
- Kingdom: Animalia
- Phylum: Arthropoda
- Class: Insecta
- Order: Diptera
- Family: Tachinidae
- Subfamily: Exoristinae
- Tribe: Goniini
- Genus: Hebia
- Species: H. flavipes

Binomial name
- Hebia flavipes Robineau-Desvoidy, 1830

Synonyms
- Paraneaera pauciseta Brauer & von Berganstamm, 1894; Hebia petiolata Robineau-Desvoidy, 1849

Species of fly

Hebia flavipes is a species of fly in the family Tachinidae.

== Distribution ==
British Isles, Czech Republic, Hungary, Poland, Slovakia, Ukraine, Denmark, Finland, Sweden, Bulgaria, Greece, Italy, Slovenia, Spain, Turkey, Austria, Belgium, France, Germany, Netherlands, Switzerland, Japan, Russia, Transcaucasia, China.
