= Chaetocrania antennalis =

Scientific classification
- Kingdom: Animalia
- Phylum: Arthropoda
- Class: Insecta
- Order: Diptera
- Family: Tachinidae
- Subfamily: Exoristinae
- Tribe: Goniini
- Genus: Chaetocrania
- Species: C. antennalis

Binomial name
- Chaetocrania antennalis Coquillett, 1897

Synonyms
- Spallanzania antennalis Coquillett, 1897

Species of fly

Chaetocrania antennalis is a species of fly in the family Tachinidae.

== Distribution ==
California.
