= Arama (disambiguation) =

Arama is a town in the Basque Country of Spain.

Arama may also refer to:

- A village in the commune of Coarnele Caprei, Iași County, Romania
- Isaac ben Moses Arama (c.1420–1494), a Spanish rabbi
- Jac Arama (born 1960), French/English poker player
- Arama (fly), genus of flies

Rivers

- Aramá River, Brazil
- Arama, a tributary of the Bistrița (Siret), Romania
- Arama River (Lunca Mare), Romania
