= Ceromasia rubrifrons =

Scientific classification
- Kingdom: Animalia
- Phylum: Arthropoda
- Class: Insecta
- Order: Diptera
- Family: Tachinidae
- Subfamily: Exoristinae
- Tribe: Goniini
- Genus: Ceromasia
- Species: C. rubrifrons

Binomial name
- Ceromasia rubrifrons (Macquart, 1834)

Synonyms
- Phorocera rubrifrons Macquart, 1834; Edesia discreta Robineau-Desvoidy, 1863; Loevia cinerella Robineau-Desvoidy, 1863; Loevia maga Robineau-Desvoidy, 1863; Masicera cespitum Macquart, 1851; Masicera cylindrica Macquart, 1851; Masicera florum Macquart, 1851; Masicera multisetosa Macquart, 1851

Species of fly

Ceromasia rubrifrons is a species of fly in the family Tachinidae.

== Distribution ==
Uzbekistan, China, Czech Republic, Hungary, Moldova, Poland, Slovakia, Ukraine, Denmark, Finland, Andorra, Bulgaria, Croatia, Greece, Italy, Portugal, Serbia, Spain, Austria, Belgium, France, Germany, Switzerland, Japan, Israel, Mongolia, Morocco, Russia, Transcaucasia.
