= Erynia =

Erynia may refer to:

- 889 Erynia, a minor planet
- Erynia (fungus), a genus in the family Entomophthoraceae

== See also ==
- Erynnia, a genus of fly
