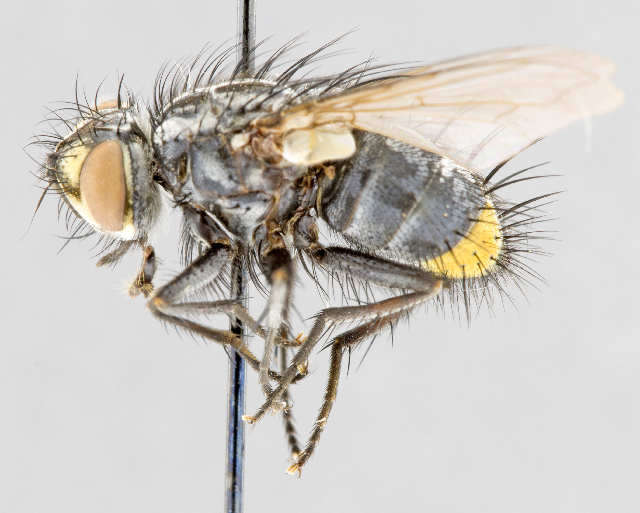

Scientific classification
- Kingdom: Animalia
- Phylum: Arthropoda
- Clade: Pancrustacea
- Class: Insecta
- Order: Diptera
- Family: Tachinidae
- Subfamily: Exoristinae
- Tribe: Goniini
- Genus: Macropatelloa; Townsend, 1931

Type species
- Macropatelloa tanumeana Townsend, 1931

= Macropatelloa =

Genus of flies

Macropatelloa is a genus of flies in the family Tachinidae.

== Species ==
- Macropatelloa tanumeana Townsend, 1931

== Distribution ==
Argentina, Chile.
