= Argyrophylax =

Scientific classification
- Kingdom: Animalia
- Phylum: Arthropoda
- Clade: Pancrustacea
- Class: Insecta
- Order: Diptera
- Family: Tachinidae
- Subfamily: Exoristinae
- Tribe: Goniini
- Genus: Argyrophylax; Brauer & von Berganstamm, 1889

Type species
- Tachina albincisa Wiedemann, 1830

Synonyms
- Malayodoria Townsend, 1926; Phoriniophylax Townsend, 1927; Thelyconychiella Mesnil, 1957

Genus of flies

Argyrophylax is a genus of flies in the family Tachinidae.

== Species ==
- Argyrophylax albincisa (Wiedemann, 1830)
- Argyrophylax apta (Walker, 1859)
- Argyrophylax basifulva Bezzi, 1925
- Argyrophylax bisetosa Thompson, 1963
- Argyrophylax cinerella Mesnil, 1953
- Argyrophylax contracta (Walker, 1859)
- Argyrophylax discreta (Mesnil, 1953)
- Argyrophylax fransseni (Baranov, 1934)
- Argyrophylax fumipennis (Townsend, 1926)
- Argyrophylax gowdeyi Curran, 1928
- Argyrophylax nigribarbis (Baranov, 1934)
- Argyrophylax nigrotibialis Baranov, 1935
- Argyrophylax niveifacies (Macquart, 1851)
- Argyrophylax phoeda (Townsend, 1927)
- Argyrophylax proclinatus Crosskey, 1963
- Argyrophylax purpurescens Townsend, 1929
- Argyrophylax solomonicus (Baranov, 1938)
- Argyrophylax triangulifera Thompson, 1963
- Argyrophylax trisetosa Curran, 1928
