= Erythrocera =

Scientific classification
- Kingdom: Animalia
- Phylum: Arthropoda
- Class: Insecta
- Order: Diptera
- Family: Tachinidae
- Subfamily: Exoristinae
- Tribe: Goniini
- Genus: Erythrocera; Robineau-Desvoidy, 1849

Type species
- Phryno nigripes Robineau-Desvoidy, 1830

Synonyms
- Curtisia Robineau-Desvoidy, 1849; Paraneaera Brauer & von Berganstamm, 1891; Paraneaera Brauer, 1893; Pexomyia Brauer & von Berganstamm, 1891

Genus of flies

Erythrocera is a genus of flies in the family Tachinidae.

== Species ==
- Erythrocera crassinervis Mesnil, 1963
- Erythrocera doris (Curran, 1927)
- Erythrocera facialis Mesnil, 1952
- Erythrocera genalis (Aldrich, 1928)
- Erythrocera hunanensis Chao & Zhou, 1992
- Erythrocera longicornis (Brauer & von Berganstamm, 1891)
- Erythrocera neolongicornis O'Hara, Shima & Zhang, 2009
- Erythrocera nigripes (Robineau-Desvoidy, 1830)
- Erythrocera palawana Dear & Crosskey, 1982
- Erythrocera picta (Villeneuve, 1936)
- Erythrocera porcula Mesnil, 1952
