= Agaedioxenis =

Scientific classification
- Kingdom: Animalia
- Phylum: Arthropoda
- Class: Insecta
- Order: Diptera
- Family: Tachinidae
- Subfamily: Exoristinae
- Tribe: Goniini
- Genus: Agaedioxenis; Villeneuve, 1939

Type species
- Gaedioxenis (Agaedioxenis) brevicornis Villeneuve, 1939

Synonyms
- Gaedioxenis Villeneuve, 1937; Gaedioxenis Villeneuve, 1939; Gaedioxenis Townsend, 1943

Genus of flies

Agaedioxenis is a genus of parasitic flies in the family Tachinidae.

== Species ==
- Agaedioxenis brevicornis (Villeneuve, 1939)
- Agaedioxenis kirkspriggsi Cerretti, O’Hara & Stireman, 2015
- Agaedioxenis setifrons (Villeneuve, 1937)
- Agaedioxenis succulentus Cerretti, O’Hara & Stireman, 2015
- Agaedioxenis timidus Cerretti, O’Hara & Stireman, 2015
