= Prosopea =

Scientific classification
- Kingdom: Animalia
- Phylum: Arthropoda
- Class: Insecta
- Order: Diptera
- Family: Tachinidae
- Subfamily: Exoristinae
- Tribe: Goniini
- Genus: Prosopea; Rondani, 1861

Type species
- Frontina instabilis Rondani, 1861

Synonyms
- Prosopaea Brauer & von Berganstamm, 1889

Genus of flies

Prosopea is a genus of flies in the family Tachinidae.

== Species ==
- Prosopea nigricans (Egger, 1861)

== Distribution ==
Tajikistan, China, Czech Republic, Hungary, Poland, Romania, Slovakia, Ukraine, Finland, Sweden, Bulgaria, Croatia, Greece, Italy, Malta, Portugal, Serbia, Spain, Austria, Channel Islands, France, Switzerland, Iran, Israel, Palestine, Mongolia, Russia, Transcaucasia.
