= Moreiria =

Scientific classification
- Kingdom: Animalia
- Phylum: Arthropoda
- Class: Insecta
- Order: Diptera
- Family: Tachinidae
- Subfamily: Exoristinae
- Tribe: Goniini
- Genus: Moreiria; Townsend, 1932

Type species
- Moreiria maura Townsend, 1932

Genus of flies

Moreiria is a genus of flies in the family Tachinidae.

== Species ==
- Moreiria maura Townsend, 1932
- Moreiria wiedemanni Toma & Guimarães, 2001

== Distribution ==
Brazil.
