= Phasmofrontina =

Scientific classification
- Kingdom: Animalia
- Phylum: Arthropoda
- Class: Insecta
- Order: Diptera
- Family: Tachinidae
- Subfamily: Exoristinae
- Tribe: Goniini
- Genus: Phasmofrontina; Townsend, 1931

Type species
- Phasmofrontina perarida Townsend, 1931

Genus of flies

Phasmofrontina is a genus of flies in the family Tachinidae.

== Species ==
- Phasmofrontina perarida Townsend, 1931

== Distribution ==
Peru.
