= Chaetoglossa =

Scientific classification
- Kingdom: Animalia
- Phylum: Arthropoda
- Class: Insecta
- Order: Diptera
- Family: Tachinidae
- Subfamily: Exoristinae
- Tribe: Goniini
- Genus: Chaetoglossa; Townsend, 1892

Type species
- Chaetoglossa picticornis Townsend, 1892

Synonyms
- Chetoglossa Guimarães, 1971

Genus of flies

Chaetoglossa is a genus of flies in the family Tachinidae.

== Species ==
- Chaetoglossa nigripalpis Townsend, 1892
- Chaetoglossa picticornis Townsend, 1892
