= Proparachaeta =

Scientific classification
- Kingdom: Animalia
- Phylum: Arthropoda
- Class: Insecta
- Order: Diptera
- Family: Tachinidae
- Subfamily: Exoristinae
- Tribe: Goniini
- Genus: Proparachaeta; Townsend, 1928

Type species
- Proparachaeta paraguayensis Townsend, 1928

Synonyms
- Proparachaetopsis Blanchard, 1942

Genus of flies

Proparachaeta is a genus of flies in the family Tachinidae.

== Species ==
- Proparachaeta niheii Toma, 2019
- Proparachaeta paraguayensis Townsend, 1928
- Proparachaeta punensis Toma, 2019
- Proparachaeta quinquevittata Blanchard, 1942
- Proparachaeta rondonensis Toma, 2019
