= Atractocerops =

Scientific classification
- Kingdom: Animalia
- Phylum: Arthropoda
- Class: Insecta
- Order: Diptera
- Family: Tachinidae
- Subfamily: Exoristinae
- Tribe: Goniini
- Genus: Atractocerops; Townsend, 1916

Type species
- Atractocerops ceylanicus Townsend, 1916

Synonyms
- Frontiniellopsis Townsend, 1927; Sigelotroxis Aldrich, 1928

Genus of flies

Atractocerops is a genus of flies in the family Tachinidae.

== Species ==
- Atractocerops aldrichi (Mesnil, 1952)
- Atractocerops ceylanicus Townsend, 1916
- Atractocerops parvus (Aldrich, 1928)
- Atractocerops sumartrensis (Townsend, 1927)
