= Ceratochaetops =

Scientific classification
- Kingdom: Animalia
- Phylum: Arthropoda
- Class: Insecta
- Order: Diptera
- Family: Tachinidae
- Subfamily: Exoristinae
- Tribe: Goniini
- Genus: Ceratochaetops; Mesnil, 1970

Type species
- Pseudophorocera triseta Villeneuve, 1922

Synonyms
- Ceratochaetops Mesnil, 1954

Genus of flies

Ceratochaetops is a genus of flies in the family Tachinidae.

== Species ==
- Ceratochaetops delphinensis (Villeneuve, 1931)
- Ceratochaetops triseta (Villeneuve, 1922)
