= Frontocnephalia =

Scientific classification
- Kingdom: Animalia
- Phylum: Arthropoda
- Class: Insecta
- Order: Diptera
- Family: Tachinidae
- Subfamily: Exoristinae
- Tribe: Goniini
- Genus: Frontocnephalia; Townsend, 1916

Type species
- Frontocnephalia angusta Townsend, 1916

Genus of flies

Frontocnephalia is a genus of flies in the family Tachinidae.

== Species ==
- Frontocnephalia angusta Townsend, 1916

== Distribution ==
Brazil.
