= Oraphasmophaga =

Scientific classification
- Kingdom: Animalia
- Phylum: Arthropoda
- Class: Insecta
- Order: Diptera
- Family: Tachinidae
- Subfamily: Exoristinae
- Tribe: Goniini
- Genus: Oraphasmophaga; Reinhard, 1958

Type species
- Paraphasmophaga pictipennis Reinhard, 1958

Genus of flies

Oraphasmophaga is a genus of flies in the family Tachinidae.

== Species ==
- Oraphasmophaga pictipennis (Reinhard, 1935)

== Distribution ==
United States.
