= Brachychaetoides =

Scientific classification
- Kingdom: Animalia
- Phylum: Arthropoda
- Class: Insecta
- Order: Diptera
- Family: Tachinidae
- Subfamily: Exoristinae
- Tribe: Goniini
- Genus: Brachychaetoides; Mesnil, 1970

Type species
- Chlorolydella (Brachychaetoides) varipes Mesnil, 1970

Genus of flies

Brachychaetoides is a genus of flies in the family Tachinidae.

== Species ==
- Brachychaetoides africanum (Mesnil, 1968)
- Brachychaetoides violacea (Curran, 1927)
