= Scaphimyia =

Scientific classification
- Kingdom: Animalia
- Phylum: Arthropoda
- Class: Insecta
- Order: Diptera
- Family: Tachinidae
- Subfamily: Exoristinae
- Tribe: Goniini
- Genus: Scaphimyia; Mesnil, 1955

Type species
- Scaphimyia castanea Mesnil, 1955

Synonyms
- Scaphimyia Mesnil, 1953; Scaphymyia Shima, 2006

Genus of flies

Scaphimyia is a genus of flies in the family Tachinidae.

== Species ==
- Scaphimyia castanea Mesnil, 1955
- Scaphimyia nigrobasicosta Chao & Shi, 1982
- Scaphimyia takanoi Mesnil, 1967
