= Suensonomyia =

Scientific classification
- Kingdom: Animalia
- Phylum: Arthropoda
- Class: Insecta
- Order: Diptera
- Family: Tachinidae
- Subfamily: Exoristinae
- Tribe: Goniini
- Genus: Suensonomyia; Mesnil, 1953

Type species
- Suensonomyia setinerva Mesnil, 1953

Genus of flies

Suensonomyia is a genus of flies in the family Tachinidae.

== Species ==
- Suensonomyia nudinerva Mesnil, 1957
- Suensonomyia setinerva Mesnil, 1953
