= Enchomyia =

Scientific classification
- Kingdom: Animalia
- Phylum: Arthropoda
- Class: Insecta
- Order: Diptera
- Family: Tachinidae
- Subfamily: Exoristinae
- Tribe: Goniini
- Genus: Enchomyia; Aldrich, 1934

Type species
- Gonia erythrocera Bigot, 1888

Genus of flies

Enchomyia is a genus of flies in the family Tachinidae.

== Species ==
- Enchomyia erythrocera (Bigot, 1888)
- Enchomyia penai Cortés, 1971
- Enchomyia shewelli Cortés, 1976
