= Hebia =

Scientific classification
- Kingdom: Animalia
- Phylum: Arthropoda
- Class: Insecta
- Order: Diptera
- Family: Tachinidae
- Subfamily: Exoristinae
- Tribe: Goniini
- Genus: Hebia; Robineau-Desvoidy, 1830

Type species
- Hebia flavipes Robineau-Desvoidy, 1830

Genus of flies

Hebia is a genus of flies in the family Tachinidae.

== Species ==
- Hebia flavipes Robineau-Desvoidy, 1830
