= Plagimasicera =

Scientific classification
- Kingdom: Animalia
- Phylum: Arthropoda
- Clade: Pancrustacea
- Class: Insecta
- Order: Diptera
- Family: Tachinidae
- Subfamily: Exoristinae
- Tribe: Goniini
- Genus: Plagimasicera; Townsend, 1915

Type species
- Plagimasicera petiolata Townsend, 1915

Synonyms
- Aeolofrontina Townsend, 1928; Aelofrontina Guimarães, 1971; Aleofrontina Townsend, 1928

Genus of flies

Plagimasicera is a genus of flies in the family Tachinidae.

== Species ==
- Plagimasicera petiolata Townsend, 1915

== Distribution ==
Peru.
