= Synamphichaeta =

Scientific classification
- Kingdom: Animalia
- Phylum: Arthropoda
- Class: Insecta
- Order: Diptera
- Family: Tachinidae
- Subfamily: Exoristinae
- Tribe: Goniini
- Genus: Synamphichaeta; Villeneuve, 1936

Type species
- Synamphichaeta tricincta Villeneuve, 1936

Genus of flies

Synamphichaeta is a genus of flies in the family Tachinidae.

== Species ==
- Synamphichaeta hirtivena Gilasian & Ziegler, 2020
- Synamphichaeta tricincta Villeneuve, 1936
