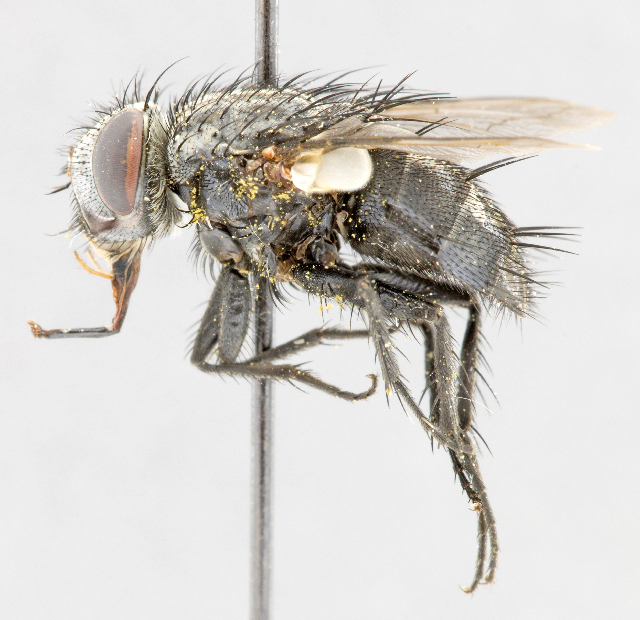
- Chaetocraniopsis argenticeps

Scientific classification
- Kingdom: Animalia
- Phylum: Arthropoda
- Class: Insecta
- Order: Diptera
- Family: Tachinidae
- Subfamily: Exoristinae
- Tribe: Goniini
- Genus: Chaetocraniopsis; Townsend, 1915

Type species
- Chaetocraniopsis chilensis Townsend, 1915

Synonyms
- Valpogonia Townsend, 1928

= Chaetocraniopsis =

Genus of flies

Chaetocraniopsis is a genus of flies in the family Tachinidae.

== Species ==
- Chaetocraniopsis argenticeps Aldrich, 1928
- Chaetocraniopsis chilensis Townsend, 1915
- Chaetocraniopsis obliteratus (Cortés, 1945)
- Chaetocraniopsis similis (Townsend, 1928)
- Chaetocraniopsis transandinum Cortés, 1980
