= Otomasicera =

Scientific classification
- Kingdom: Animalia
- Phylum: Arthropoda
- Clade: Pancrustacea
- Class: Insecta
- Order: Diptera
- Family: Tachinidae
- Subfamily: Exoristinae
- Tribe: Goniini
- Genus: Otomasicera; Townsend, 1912
- Species: O. patella

Binomial name
- Otomasicera patella Townsend, 1912

Genus of flies

Otomasicera is a genus of flies in the family Tachinidae. The only species is Otomasicera patella.
