= Mayodistichona =

Scientific classification
- Kingdom: Animalia
- Phylum: Arthropoda
- Class: Insecta
- Order: Diptera
- Family: Tachinidae
- Subfamily: Exoristinae
- Tribe: Goniini
- Genus: Mayodistichona; Townsend, 1928

Type species
- Mayodistichona facialis Townsend, 1928

Genus of flies

Mayodistichona is a genus of flies in the family Tachinidae.

== Species ==
- Mayodistichona facialis Townsend, 1928

== Distribution ==
Peru.
