= Myxophryxe =

Scientific classification
- Kingdom: Animalia
- Phylum: Arthropoda
- Class: Insecta
- Order: Diptera
- Family: Tachinidae
- Subfamily: Exoristinae
- Tribe: Goniini
- Genus: Myxophryxe; Cerretti & O'Hara, 2016

Type species
- Phorocera longirostris Villeneuve, 1938

Genus of flies

Myxophryxe is a genus of flies in the family Tachinidae.

== Species ==
- Myxophryxe longirostris (Villeneuve, 1938)
- Myxophryxe murina Cerretti & O'Hara, 2016
- Myxophryxe regalis Cerretti & O'Hara, 2016
- Myxophryxe satanas Cerretti & O'Hara, 2016
