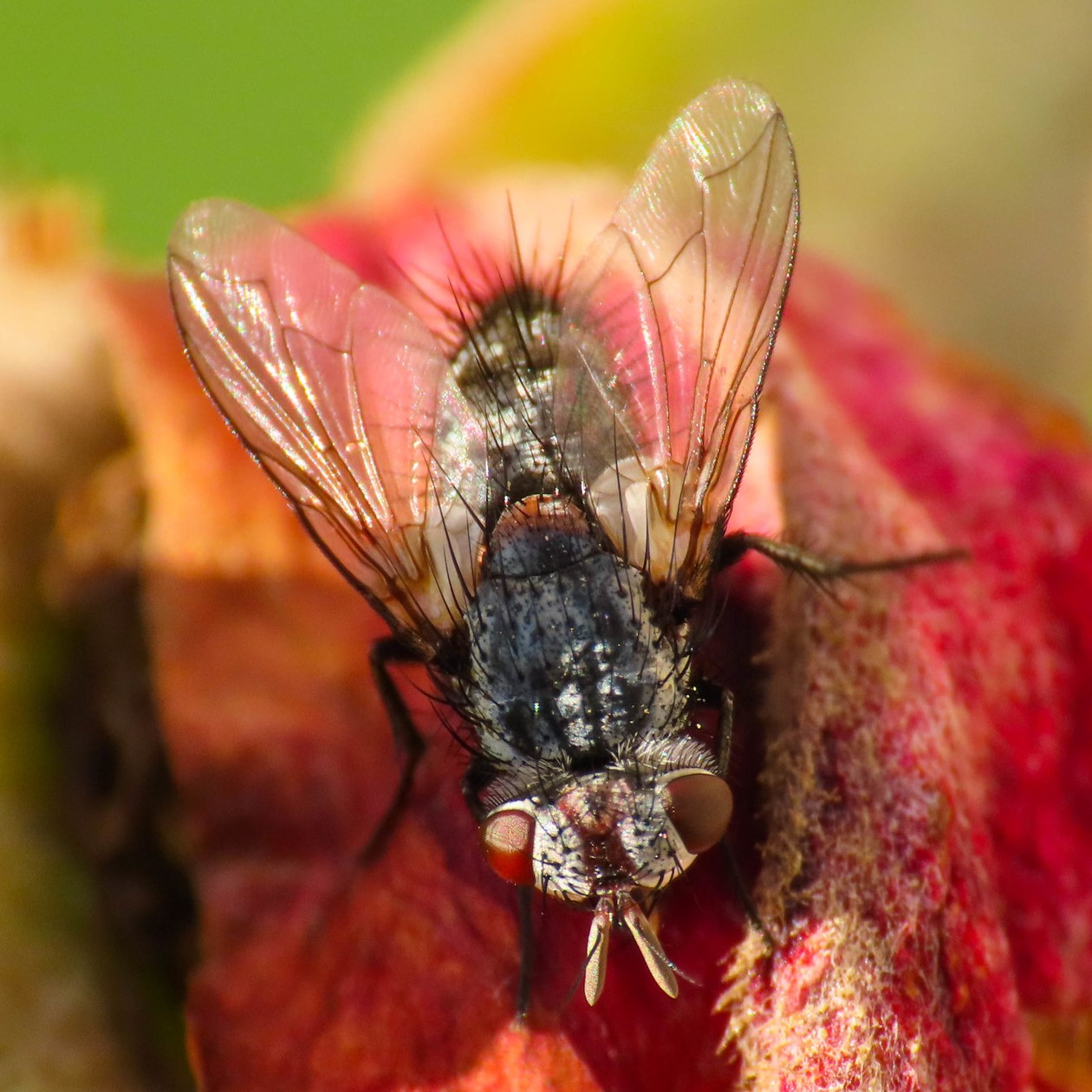

Scientific classification
- Kingdom: Animalia
- Phylum: Arthropoda
- Class: Insecta
- Order: Diptera
- Family: Tachinidae
- Subfamily: Exoristinae
- Tribe: Goniini
- Genus: Thelymorpha; Brauer & von Berganstamm, 1889
- Species: T. marmorata

Binomial name
- Thelymorpha marmorata (Fabricius, 1805)

Synonyms
- List (Genus): Baumhaueria Meade, 1892; Histochaeta Scudder, 1882; (Species): Latreillia minor Robineau-Desvoidy, 1830; Latreillia rubetra Robineau-Desvoidy, 1863; Latreillia silvestris Robineau-Desvoidy, 1830; Musca marmorata Fabricius, 1805; Phorocera verecunda Rondani, 1859; Tachina vertiginosa Fallén, 1820; Thelymorpha vertiginosa (Fallén, 1820)

= Thelymorpha =

Genus of flies

Thelymorpha is a genus of flies in the family Tachinidae. It is monotypic, being represented by the single species Thelymorpha marmorata.
