= Metopiopsis =

Scientific classification
- Kingdom: Animalia
- Phylum: Arthropoda
- Class: Insecta
- Order: Diptera
- Family: Tachinidae
- Subfamily: Exoristinae
- Tribe: Goniini
- Genus: Metopiopsis; Vimmer & Soukup, 1940

Type species
- Metopiopsis aurea Vimmer & Soukup, 1940

Synonyms
- Metopiopsis Vimmer & Soukup, 1940

Genus of flies

Metopiopsis is a genus of flies in the family Tachinidae.

== Species ==
- Metopiopsis aurea Vimmer & Soukup, 1940

== Distribution ==
Peru.
