= Tasmaniomyia =

Scientific classification
- Kingdom: Animalia
- Phylum: Arthropoda
- Clade: Pancrustacea
- Class: Insecta
- Order: Diptera
- Family: Tachinidae
- Subfamily: Exoristinae
- Tribe: Goniini
- Genus: Tasmaniomyia; Townsend, 1916

Type species
- Masicera viridiventris Macquart, 1847

Synonyms
- Chlorogaster Macquart, 1851; Chlorogastrina Crosskey, 1967

Genus of flies

Tasmaniomyia is a genus of flies in the family Tachinidae.

== Species ==
- Tasmaniomyia viridiventris (Macquart, 1847)

== Distribution ==
Australia.
