= Chloropales =

Scientific classification
- Kingdom: Animalia
- Phylum: Arthropoda
- Class: Insecta
- Order: Diptera
- Family: Tachinidae
- Subfamily: Exoristinae
- Tribe: Goniini
- Genus: Chloropales; Mesnil, 1950

Type species
- Chloropales luteifacies Mesnil, 1950

Genus of flies

Chloropales is a genus of flies in the family Tachinidae.

== Species ==
- Chloropales fingens (Walker, 1865)
- Chloropales luteifacies Mesnil, 1950
