= Araucosimus =

Scientific classification
- Kingdom: Animalia
- Phylum: Arthropoda
- Class: Insecta
- Order: Diptera
- Family: Tachinidae
- Subfamily: Exoristinae
- Tribe: Goniini
- Genus: Araucosimus; Aldrich, 1934

Type species
- Araucosimus bullocki Aldrich, 1934

Genus of flies

Araucosimus is a genus of flies in the family Tachinidae.

== Species ==
- Araucosimus bullocki Aldrich, 1934
- Araucosimus orfilanus Cortés, 1979
- Araucosimus superbus Cortés, 1945
