= Frontiniella =

Scientific classification
- Kingdom: Animalia
- Phylum: Arthropoda
- Class: Insecta
- Order: Diptera
- Family: Tachinidae
- Subfamily: Exoristinae
- Tribe: Goniini
- Genus: Frontiniella; Townsend, 1918

Type species
- Frontiniella parancilla Townsend, 1918

Synonyms
- Eufrontina Brooks, 1945

Genus of flies

Frontiniella is a genus of flies in the family Tachinidae.

== Species ==
- Frontiniella apache O'Hara, 1993
- Frontiniella ethniae (Brooks, 1945)
- Frontiniella incarcerata O'Hara, 1993
- Frontiniella jorgenseni O'Hara, 1993
- Frontiniella loxostegei Blanchard, 1962
- Frontiniella parancilla Townsend, 1918
- Frontiniella regilla (Reinhard, 1959)
- Frontiniella spectabilis (Aldrich, 1916)
- Frontiniella surstylata O'Hara, 1993
