= Eucnephalia =

Scientific classification
- Kingdom: Animalia
- Phylum: Arthropoda
- Class: Insecta
- Order: Diptera
- Family: Tachinidae
- Subfamily: Exoristinae
- Tribe: Goniini
- Genus: Eucnephalia; Townsend, 1892

Type species
- Eucnephalia gonoides Townsend, 1892

Genus of flies

Eucnephalia is a genus of flies in the family Tachinidae.

== Species ==
- Eucnephalia gonoides Townsend, 1892

== Distribution ==
United States.
