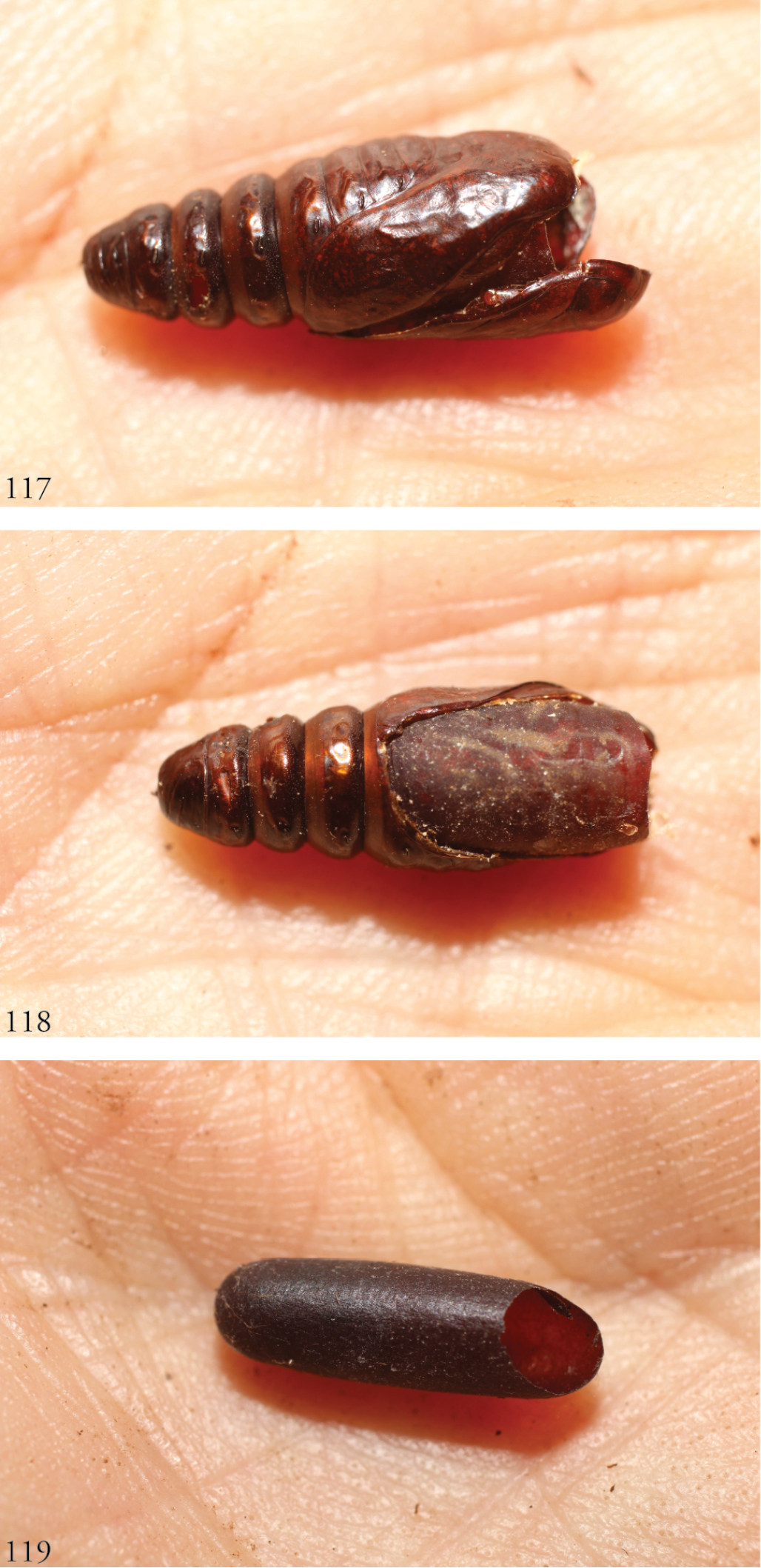
- Lophomyra (10.3897-zookeys.788.21235) Figures 117–119

Scientific classification
- Kingdom: Animalia
- Phylum: Arthropoda
- Class: Insecta
- Order: Diptera
- Family: Tachinidae
- Subfamily: Exoristinae
- Tribe: Goniini
- Genus: Atactosturmia; Townsend, 1915

Type species
- Blepharipa politana Townsend, 1911

= Atactosturmia =

Genus of flies

Atactosturmia is a genus of flies in the family Tachinidae. It is a larval parasitoid of Anticarsia gemmatalis as well as Helicoverpa armigera.

== Species ==
- Atactosturmia politana (Townsend, 1911)
- Atactosturmia vittata Thompson, 1963
