= Pachystylum =

Scientific classification
- Kingdom: Animalia
- Phylum: Arthropoda
- Class: Insecta
- Order: Diptera
- Family: Tachinidae
- Subfamily: Exoristinae
- Tribe: Goniini
- Genus: Pachystylum; Macquart, 1848

Synonyms
- Chaetomera Brauer & von Berganstamm, 1889

Genus of flies

Pachystylum is a genus of flies in the family Tachinidae.

== Species ==
- Pachystylum bremii Macquart, 1848

== Distribution ==
China, Estonia, Hungary, Poland, Italy, Portugal, Slovenia, Spain, Austria, France, Germany, Switzerland, Russia, Transcaucasia.
