= Allosturmia =

Scientific classification
- Kingdom: Animalia
- Phylum: Arthropoda
- Class: Insecta
- Order: Diptera
- Family: Tachinidae
- Subfamily: Exoristinae
- Tribe: Goniini
- Genus: Allosturmia; Blanchard, 1958

Type species
- Allosturmia turicai Blanchard, 1958

Genus of flies

Allosturmia is a genus of flies in the family Tachinidae.

== Species ==
- Allosturmia turicai Blanchard, 1958

== Distribution ==
Argentina.
