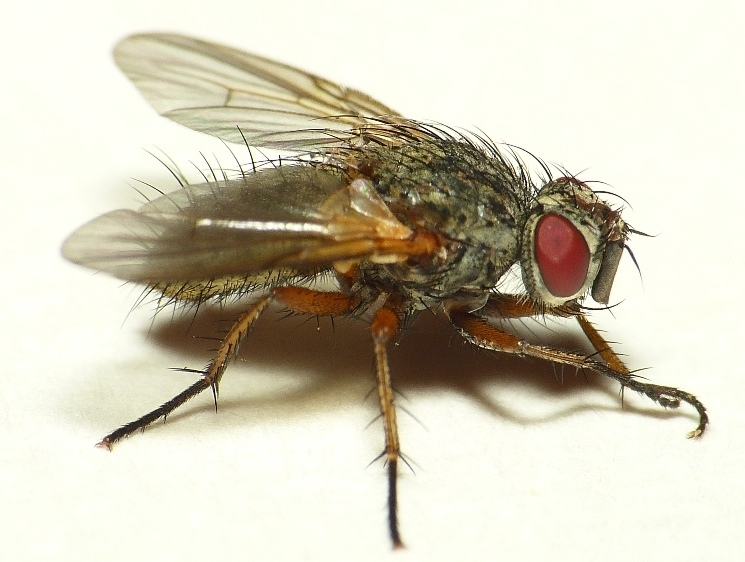
- Ocytata pallipes

Scientific classification
- Kingdom: Animalia
- Phylum: Arthropoda
- Class: Insecta
- Order: Diptera
- Family: Tachinidae
- Subfamily: Exoristinae
- Tribe: Goniini
- Genus: Ocytata; Gistel, 1848

Type species
- Roeselia arvensis Robineau-Desvoidy, 1830

Synonyms
- Ceromasiops Townsend, 1911; Roeselia Robineau-Desvoidy, 1830; Racodineura Rondani, 1861; Rhacodineura Bezzi & Stein, 1907

= Ocytata =

Genus of flies

Ocytata is a genus of flies in the family Tachinidae.

== Species ==
- Ocytata pallipes (Fallén, 1820)

== Distribution ==
Tajikistan, British Isles, Czech Republic, Hungary, Lithuania, Moldova, Poland, Romania, Slovakia, Ukraine, Denmark, Norway, Sweden, Andorra, Bulgaria, Croatia, Greece, Italy, Malta, Portugal, Serbia, Spain, Turkey, Austria, Belgium, France, Germany, Netherlands, Switzerland, Israel, Russia, Armenia, Azerbaijan.
