= Mendelssohnia =

Scientific classification
- Kingdom: Animalia
- Phylum: Arthropoda
- Class: Insecta
- Order: Diptera
- Family: Tachinidae
- Subfamily: Exoristinae
- Tribe: Goniini
- Genus: Mendelssohnia; Kugler, 1971

Type species
- Mendelssohnia sinaica Kugler, 1971

Genus of flies

Mendelssohnia is a genus of flies in the family Tachinidae.

== Species ==
- Mendelssohnia sinaica Kugler, 1971

== Distribution ==
Israel, Egypt.
