= Masicera =

Scientific classification
- Kingdom: Animalia
- Phylum: Arthropoda
- Clade: Pancrustacea
- Class: Insecta
- Order: Diptera
- Family: Tachinidae
- Subfamily: Exoristinae
- Tribe: Goniini
- Genus: Masicera; Macquart, 1834

Type species
- Masicera pavoniae Robineau-Desvoidy, 1830

Genus of flies

Masicera is a genus of flies in the family Tachinidae.

== Species ==
- Masicera pavoniae (Robineau-Desvoidy, 1830)
- Masicera silvatica (Fallén, 1810)
- Masicera sphingivora (Robineau-Desvoidy, 1830)
- Masicera vivida Robineau-Desvoidy, 1863
