= Manola (fly) =

Scientific classification
- Kingdom: Animalia
- Phylum: Arthropoda
- Clade: Pancrustacea
- Class: Insecta
- Order: Diptera
- Family: Tachinidae
- Subfamily: Exoristinae
- Tribe: Goniini
- Genus: Manola; Richter, 1982

Type species
- Manola xenocera Richter, 1982

Genus of flies

Manola is a genus of flies in the family Tachinidae.

== Species ==
- Manola xenocera Richter, 1982

== Distribution ==
Turkmenistan, Uzbekistan.
