= Paravibrissina =

Scientific classification
- Kingdom: Animalia
- Phylum: Arthropoda
- Class: Insecta
- Order: Diptera
- Family: Tachinidae
- Subfamily: Exoristinae
- Tribe: Goniini
- Genus: Paravibrissina; Shima, 1979

Type species
- Paravibrissina adiscalis Shima, 1979

Genus of flies

Paravibrissina is a genus of flies in the family Tachinidae.

== Species ==
- Paravibrissina adiscalis Shima, 1979
- Paravibrissina argentifera Shima & Tachi, 2008
- Paravibrissina aurigera Shima & Tachi, 2008
- Paravibrissina caldwelli (Baranov, 1938)
- Paravibrissina infuscata Shima, 1979
- Paravibrissina leucogaster Shima & Tachi, 2008
- Paravibrissina pacifica Shima & Tachi, 2008
- Paravibrissina parvula Shima & Tachi, 2008
- Paravibrissina thailandica Shima, 1979
