= Araucogonia =

Scientific classification
- Kingdom: Animalia
- Phylum: Arthropoda
- Clade: Pancrustacea
- Class: Insecta
- Order: Diptera
- Family: Tachinidae
- Subfamily: Exoristinae
- Tribe: Goniini
- Genus: Araucogonia; Cortés, 1976

Type species
- Araucogonia speciosa Cortés, 1976

Genus of flies

Araucogonia is a genus of flies in the family Tachinidae.

== Species ==
- Araucogonia speciosa Cortés, 1976

== Distribution ==
Chile.
