= Phasiatacta =

Scientific classification
- Kingdom: Animalia
- Phylum: Arthropoda
- Class: Insecta
- Order: Diptera
- Family: Tachinidae
- Subfamily: Exoristinae
- Tribe: Goniini
- Genus: Phasiatacta; Townsend, 1911

Type species
- Phasiatacta elongata Townsend, 1911

Genus of flies

Phasiatacta is a genus of flies in the family Tachinidae.

== Species ==
- Phasiatacta elongata Townsend, 1911

== Distribution ==
Peru.
