= Paliana =

Scientific classification
- Kingdom: Animalia
- Phylum: Arthropoda
- Class: Insecta
- Order: Diptera
- Family: Tachinidae
- Subfamily: Exoristinae
- Tribe: Goniini
- Genus: Paliana; Curran, 1927

Type species
- Paliana basalis Curran, 1927

Genus of flies

Paliana is a genus of flies in the family Tachinidae.

== Species ==
- Paliana basalis Curran, 1927
- Paliana phasioides (Walker, 1858)
