= Cylindromasicera =

Scientific classification
- Kingdom: Animalia
- Phylum: Arthropoda
- Class: Insecta
- Order: Diptera
- Family: Tachinidae
- Subfamily: Exoristinae
- Tribe: Goniini
- Genus: Cylindromasicera; Townsend, 1915

Type species
- Cylindromasicera prima Townsend, 1915

Genus of flies

Cylindromasicera is a genus of flies in the family Tachinidae.

== Species ==
- Cylindromasicera prima Townsend, 1915

== Distribution ==
Peru.
