= Palpozenillia =

Scientific classification
- Kingdom: Animalia
- Phylum: Arthropoda
- Class: Insecta
- Order: Diptera
- Family: Tachinidae
- Subfamily: Exoristinae
- Tribe: Goniini
- Genus: Palpozenillia; Townsend, 1934

Type species
- Zenillia palpalis Aldrich, 1932

Genus of flies

Palpozenillia is a genus of flies in the family Tachinidae.

== Species ==
- Palpozenillia diatraeae Townsend, 1941
- Palpozenillia palpalis (Aldrich, 1932)
