= Blepharopoda =

Scientific classification
- Kingdom: Animalia
- Phylum: Arthropoda
- Clade: Pancrustacea
- Class: Insecta
- Order: Diptera
- Family: Tachinidae
- Subfamily: Exoristinae
- Tribe: Goniini
- Genus: Blepharopoda; Rondani, 1850

Type species
- Blepharopoda pilitarsis Rondani, 1850

Genus of flies

Blepharopoda is a genus of flies in the family Tachinidae.

== Species ==
- Blepharopoda pilitarsis Rondani in Osculati, 1850

== Distribution ==
Ecuador
