= Carceliella =

Scientific classification
- Kingdom: Animalia
- Phylum: Arthropoda
- Class: Insecta
- Order: Diptera
- Family: Tachinidae
- Subfamily: Exoristinae
- Tribe: Goniini
- Genus: Carceliella; Baranov, 1934

Type species
- Carcelia octava Baranov, 1931

Synonyms
- Microcarcelia Baranov, 1934

Genus of flies

Carceliella is a genus of flies in the family Tachinidae.

== Species ==
- Carceliella atripes (Malloch, 1935)
- Carceliella octava (Baranov, 1931)
