= Torosomyia =

Scientific classification
- Kingdom: Animalia
- Phylum: Arthropoda
- Class: Insecta
- Order: Diptera
- Family: Tachinidae
- Subfamily: Exoristinae
- Tribe: Goniini
- Genus: Torosomyia; Reinhard, 1935

Type species
- Torosomyia parallela Reinhard, 1935

Genus of flies

Torosomyia is a genus of flies in the family Tachinidae.

== Species ==
- Torosomyia parallela Reinhard, 1935

== Distribution ==
United States.
