= Myxarchiclops =

Scientific classification
- Kingdom: Animalia
- Phylum: Arthropoda
- Class: Insecta
- Order: Diptera
- Family: Tachinidae
- Subfamily: Exoristinae
- Tribe: Goniini
- Genus: Myxarchiclops; Villeneuve, 1916

Type species
- Myxarchiclops caffer Villeneuve, 1916

Genus of flies

Myxarchiclops is a genus of flies in the family Tachinidae.

== Species ==
- Myxarchiclops caffer Villeneuve, 1916
- Myxarchiclops major Villeneuve, 1930

== Distribution ==
South Africa.
