= Sericozenillia =

Scientific classification
- Kingdom: Animalia
- Phylum: Arthropoda
- Class: Insecta
- Order: Diptera
- Family: Tachinidae
- Subfamily: Exoristinae
- Tribe: Goniini
- Genus: Sericozenillia; Mesnil, 1957

Type species
- Zenillia (Sericozenillia) albipila Mesnil, 1957

Genus of flies

Sericozenillia is a genus of flies in the family Tachinidae.

== Species ==
- Sericozenillia albipila (Mesnil, 1957)

== Distribution ==
Japan, China.
