= Palesisa =

Scientific classification
- Kingdom: Animalia
- Phylum: Arthropoda
- Class: Insecta
- Order: Diptera
- Family: Tachinidae
- Subfamily: Exoristinae
- Tribe: Goniini
- Genus: Palesisa; Villeneuve, 1929

Type species
- Palesisa nudioculata Villeneuve, 1929

Genus of flies

Palesisa is a genus of flies in the family Tachinidae.

== Species ==
- Palesisa aureola Richter, 1974
- Palesisa deserticola (Rohdendorf, 1931)
- Palesisa maculosa (Villeneuve, 1936)
- Palesisa nudioculata Villeneuve, 1929
