= Ugimeigenia =

Scientific classification
- Kingdom: Animalia
- Phylum: Arthropoda
- Class: Insecta
- Order: Diptera
- Family: Tachinidae
- Subfamily: Exoristinae
- Tribe: Goniini
- Genus: Ugimeigenia; Townsend, 1916

Type species
- Ugimeigenia elzneri Townsend, 1916

Genus of flies

Ugimeigenia is a genus of flies in the family Tachinidae.

== Species ==
- Ugimeigenia elzneri Townsend, 1916

== Distribution ==
Australia, Papua New Guinea, Solomon Islands.
