= Dolichogonia =

Scientific classification
- Kingdom: Animalia
- Phylum: Arthropoda
- Class: Insecta
- Order: Diptera
- Family: Tachinidae
- Subfamily: Exoristinae
- Tribe: Goniini
- Genus: Dolichogonia; Townsend, 1915

Type species
- Dolichogonia aurea Townsend, 1915

Synonyms
- Dolichogenia Sharp, 1917

Genus of flies

Dolichogonia is a genus of flies in the family Tachinidae.

== Species ==
- Dolichogonia aurea Townsend, 1915

== Distribution ==
Peru.
