= Chrysotryphera =

Scientific classification
- Kingdom: Animalia
- Phylum: Arthropoda
- Class: Insecta
- Order: Diptera
- Family: Tachinidae
- Subfamily: Exoristinae
- Tribe: Goniini
- Genus: Chrysotryphera; Townsend, 1935

Type species
- Chrysotryphera conica Townsend, 1935

Genus of flies

Chrysotryphera is a genus of flies in the family Tachinidae.

== Species ==
- Chrysotryphera conica Townsend, 1935

== Distribution ==
Brazil.
