= Crosskeya =

Scientific classification
- Kingdom: Animalia
- Phylum: Arthropoda
- Class: Insecta
- Order: Diptera
- Family: Tachinidae
- Subfamily: Exoristinae
- Tribe: Goniini
- Genus: Crosskeya; Shima & Chao, 1988

Type species
- Crosskeya gigas Shima & Chao, 1988

Genus of flies

Crosskeya is a genus of flies in the family Tachinidae.

== Species ==
- Crosskeya assimilis Shima & Chao, 1988
- Crosskeya chrysos Shima & Chao, 1988
- Crosskeya gigas Shima & Chao, 1988
- Crosskeya longicornis Shima & Chao, 1988
- Crosskeya nigrotibialis Shima & Chao, 1988
- Crosskeya papuana Shima & Chao, 1988
