= Blephariatacta =

Scientific classification
- Kingdom: Animalia
- Phylum: Arthropoda
- Class: Insecta
- Order: Diptera
- Family: Tachinidae
- Subfamily: Exoristinae
- Tribe: Goniini
- Genus: Blephariatacta; Townsend, 1931

Type species
- Blephariatacta brasiliana Townsend, 1931

Genus of flies

Blephariatacta is a genus of flies in the family Tachinidae.

== Species ==
- Blephariatacta brasiliana Townsend, 1931

== Distribution ==
Brazil.
