= Polychaeta (fly) =

Scientific classification
- Kingdom: Animalia
- Phylum: Arthropoda
- Clade: Pancrustacea
- Class: Insecta
- Order: Diptera
- Family: Tachinidae
- Subfamily: Exoristinae
- Tribe: Goniini
- Genus: Polychaeta; Macquart, 1851

Type species
- Polychaeta nigra Macquart, 1851

Genus of flies

Polychaeta is a genus of flies in the family Tachinidae.

== Species ==
- Polychaeta nigra Macquart, 1851

== Distribution ==
Australia.
