= Euceromasia =

Scientific classification
- Kingdom: Animalia
- Phylum: Arthropoda
- Class: Insecta
- Order: Diptera
- Family: Tachinidae
- Subfamily: Exoristinae
- Tribe: Goniini
- Genus: Euceromasia; Townsend, 1912

Type species
- Euceromasia spinosa Townsend, 1912

Genus of flies

Euceromasia is a genus of flies in the family Tachinidae.

== Species ==
- Euceromasia floridensis Reinhard, 1957
- Euceromasia neptis Reinhard, 1947
- Euceromasia sobrina Reinhard, 1975
- Euceromasia solata Reinhard, 1947
- Euceromasia spinosa Townsend, 1912
