= Tritaxys =

Scientific classification
- Kingdom: Animalia
- Phylum: Arthropoda
- Class: Insecta
- Order: Diptera
- Family: Tachinidae
- Subfamily: Exoristinae
- Tribe: Goniini
- Genus: Tritaxys; Macquart, 1847

Type species
- Tritaxys australis Macquart, 1847

Synonyms
- Gonanamastax Townsend, 1933; Goniophana Brauer & von Berganstamm, 1889

Genus of flies

Tritaxys is a genus of flies in the family Tachinidae.

== Species ==
- Tritaxys australis Macquart, 1847
- Tritaxys borisi Richter, 1995
- Tritaxys braueri Meijere, 1924
- Tritaxys goniaeformis (Macquart, 1846)
- Tritaxys heterocera (Macquart, 1846)
- Tritaxys milias (Walker, 1849)
- Tritaxys scutellata (Macquart, 1846)
