= Neopodomyia =

Scientific classification
- Kingdom: Animalia
- Phylum: Arthropoda
- Class: Insecta
- Order: Diptera
- Family: Tachinidae
- Subfamily: Exoristinae
- Tribe: Goniini
- Genus: Neopodomyia; Townsend, 1927

Type species
- Neopodomyia oralis Townsend, 1927

Synonyms
- Neupodomyia Townsend, 1927

Genus of flies

Neopodomyia is a genus of flies in the family Tachinidae.

== Species ==
- Neopodomyia oralis Townsend, 1927

== Distribution ==
Neopodomyia has been recorded in Peru.
