= Bourquinia =

Scientific classification
- Kingdom: Animalia
- Phylum: Arthropoda
- Class: Insecta
- Order: Diptera
- Family: Tachinidae
- Subfamily: Exoristinae
- Tribe: Goniini
- Genus: Bourquinia; Blanchard, 1935

Type species
- Bourquinia deaurata Blanchard, 1935

Synonyms
- Bourguinia Neave, 1939

Genus of flies

Bourquinia is a genus of flies in the family Tachinidae.

== Species ==
- Bourquinia deaurata Blanchard, 1935

== Distribution ==
Argentina.
