= Stiremania =

Scientific classification
- Kingdom: Animalia
- Phylum: Arthropoda
- Class: Insecta
- Order: Diptera
- Family: Tachinidae
- Subfamily: Exoristinae
- Tribe: Goniini
- Genus: Stiremania; Cerretti & O'Hara, 2016

Type species
- Stiremania karoo Cerretti & O'Hara, 2016

Genus of flies

Stiremania is a genus of flies in the family Tachinidae.

== Species ==
- Stiremania karoo Cerretti & O'Hara, 2016
- Stiremania robusta Cerretti & O'Hara, 2016

== Distribution ==
South Africa.
