= Vibrissovoria =

Scientific classification
- Kingdom: Animalia
- Phylum: Arthropoda
- Clade: Pancrustacea
- Class: Insecta
- Order: Diptera
- Family: Tachinidae
- Subfamily: Exoristinae
- Tribe: Goniini
- Genus: Vibrissovoria; Townsend, 1919

Type species
- Vibrissovoria petiolata Townsend, 1919

Genus of flies

Vibrissovoria is a genus of flies in the family Tachinidae.

== Species ==
- Vibrissovoria aurea Townsend, 1929
- Vibrissovoria petiolata Townsend, 1919
