= Gaediophanopsis =

Scientific classification
- Kingdom: Animalia
- Phylum: Arthropoda
- Class: Insecta
- Order: Diptera
- Family: Tachinidae
- Subfamily: Exoristinae
- Tribe: Goniini
- Genus: Gaediophanopsis; Blanchard, 1954

Type species
- Gaediophanopsis koehleri Blanchard, 1954

Genus of flies

Gaediophanopsis is a genus of flies in the family Tachinidae.

== Species ==
- Gaediophanopsis koehleri Blanchard, 1954

== Distribution ==
Argentina.
