= Parapexopsis =

Scientific classification
- Kingdom: Animalia
- Phylum: Arthropoda
- Class: Insecta
- Order: Diptera
- Family: Tachinidae
- Subfamily: Exoristinae
- Tribe: Goniini
- Genus: Parapexopsis; Mesnil, 1953

Type species
- Parapexopsis cephalotes Mesnil, 1953

Genus of flies

Parapexopsis is a genus of flies in the family Tachinidae.

== Species ==
- Parapexopsis cavifacies Herting, 1973
- Parapexopsis cephalotes Mesnil, 1953
