= Masistylum =

Scientific classification
- Kingdom: Animalia
- Phylum: Arthropoda
- Class: Insecta
- Order: Diptera
- Family: Tachinidae
- Subfamily: Exoristinae
- Tribe: Goniini
- Genus: Masistylum; Brauer & von Berganstamm, 1893

Type species
- Pachystylum arcuatum (Mik, 1863)

Genus of flies

Masistylum is a genus of flies in the family Tachinidae.

== Species ==
- Masistylum arcuatum (Mik, 1863)
- Masistylum stenommatum Wood, 1974
