= Caltagironea =

Scientific classification
- Kingdom: Animalia
- Phylum: Arthropoda
- Class: Insecta
- Order: Diptera
- Family: Tachinidae
- Subfamily: Exoristinae
- Tribe: Goniini
- Genus: Caltagironea; Cortés & Campos, 1974

Type species
- Caltagironea vera Cortés & Campos, 1974

Genus of flies

Caltagironea is a genus of flies in the family Tachinidae.

== Species ==
- Caltagironea scillina Cortés & Campos, 1974
- Caltagironea vera Cortés & Campos, 1974

== Distribution ==
Chile,
