= Gaedia =

Scientific classification
- Kingdom: Animalia
- Phylum: Arthropoda
- Class: Insecta
- Order: Diptera
- Family: Tachinidae
- Subfamily: Exoristinae
- Tribe: Goniini
- Genus: Gaedia; Meigen, 1838

Type species
- Tachina connexa Meigen, 1824

Synonyms
- Gedia Rondani, 1856

Genus of flies

Gaedia is a genus of flies in the family Tachinidae.

== Species ==
- Gaedia connexa (Meigen, 1824)
- Gaedia distincta Egger, 1861
- Gaedia hispanica Mesnil, 1953
- Gaedia lauta Richter, 1969
