= Sturmiellina =

Scientific classification
- Kingdom: Animalia
- Phylum: Arthropoda
- Class: Insecta
- Order: Diptera
- Family: Tachinidae
- Subfamily: Exoristinae
- Tribe: Goniini
- Genus: Sturmiellina; Thompson, 1963

Type species
- Sturmiellina trinitatis Thompson, 1963

Genus of flies

Sturmiellina is a genus of flies in the family Tachinidae.

== Species ==
- Sturmiellina trinitatis Thompson, 1963

== Distribution ==
Trinidad and Tobago.
