= Thelairosoma =

Scientific classification
- Kingdom: Animalia
- Phylum: Arthropoda
- Class: Insecta
- Order: Diptera
- Family: Tachinidae
- Subfamily: Exoristinae
- Tribe: Goniini
- Genus: Thelairosoma; Villeneuve, 1916

Type species
- Thelairosoma fumosum Villeneuve, 1916

Synonyms
- Benigramma Lehrer, 2013; Lespesiopsis Mesnil, 1954; Seyrigomyia Mesnil, 1944; Thelairoxenis Mesnil, 1954

Genus of flies

Thelairosoma is a genus of flies in the family Tachinidae.

== Species ==
- Thelairosoma angustifrons (Villeneuve, 1916)
- Thelairosoma atrum Mesnil, 1970
- Thelairosoma bellanda (Lehrer, 2013)
- Thelairosoma brunnescens (Villeneuve, 1934)
- Thelairosoma carbonatum (Mesnil, 1944)
- Thelairosoma coerulescens Mesnil, 1954
- Thelairosoma comatum Villeneuve, 1938
- Thelairosoma diaphanum Mesnil, 1954
- Thelairosoma flavipalpe Villeneuve, 1938
- Thelairosoma fulvellum (Mesnil, 1944)
- Thelairosoma fumosum Villeneuve, 1916
- Thelairosoma hybridum Mesnil, 1970
- Thelairosoma ingrami Mesnil, 1970
- Thelairosoma longicorne Mesnil, 1954
- Thelairosoma lutescens Mesnil, 1954
- Thelairosoma major Mesnil, 1970
- Thelairosoma melancholicum Mesnil, 1970
- Thelairosoma obversum Villeneuve, 1943
- Thelairosoma pallidum Mesnil, 1954
- Thelairosoma palposum Villeneuve, 1938
- Thelairosoma pulchellum (Mesnil, 1944)
- Thelairosoma quadriguttatum (Mesnil, 1944)
- Thelairosoma rosatum Villeneuve, 1943
- Thelairosoma triste Mesnil, 1970
- Thelairosoma varipes Villeneuve, 1943
