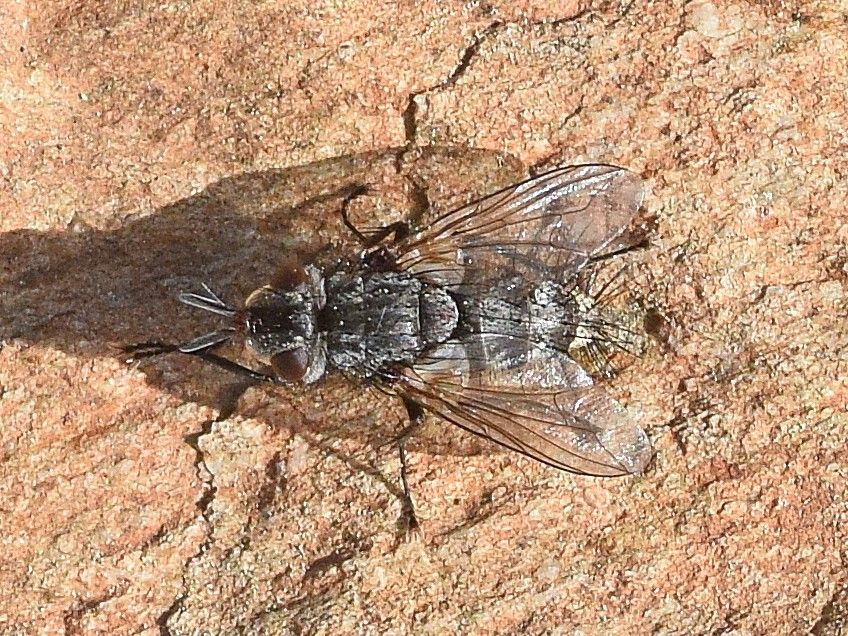
- Baumhaueria microps

Scientific classification
- Kingdom: Animalia
- Phylum: Arthropoda
- Clade: Pancrustacea
- Class: Insecta
- Order: Diptera
- Family: Tachinidae
- Subfamily: Exoristinae
- Tribe: Goniini
- Genus: Baumhaueria; Meigen, 1838

Type species
- Tachina goniaeformis Meigen, 1824

Synonyms
- Aguilarina Mesnil, 1963; Baumauheria Rondani, 1861; Pachycephala Lioy, 1864

= Baumhaueria =

Genus of flies

Baumhaueria is a genus of flies in the family Tachinidae.

== Species ==
- Baumhaueria frontalis Mesnil, 1963
- Baumhaueria goniaeformis (Meigen, 1824)
- Baumhaueria microps Mesnil, 1963
- Baumhaueria montana Richter, 2001
- Baumhaueria nobilis Mesnil, 1963
- Baumhaueria scutellaris Ziegler, 1991
- Baumhaueria tibialis Villeneuve, 1910
