= Paraphasmophaga =

Scientific classification
- Kingdom: Animalia
- Phylum: Arthropoda
- Class: Insecta
- Order: Diptera
- Family: Tachinidae
- Subfamily: Exoristinae
- Tribe: Goniini
- Genus: Paraphasmophaga; Townsend, 1915

Type species
- Paraphasmophaga clavis Townsend, 1915

Genus of flies

Paraphasmophaga is a genus of flies in the family Tachinidae.

== Species ==
- Paraphasmophaga clavis Townsend, 1915
- Paraphasmophaga dissita Reinhard, 1962
