= Caeniopsis =

Scientific classification
- Kingdom: Animalia
- Phylum: Arthropoda
- Class: Insecta
- Order: Diptera
- Family: Tachinidae
- Subfamily: Exoristinae
- Tribe: Goniini
- Genus: Caeniopsis; Townsend, 1927

Type species
- Caeniopsis brevifrons Townsend, 1927

Genus of flies

Caeniopsis is a genus of flies in the family Tachinidae.

== Species ==
- Caeniopsis brevifrons Townsend, 1927

== Distribution ==
Brazil.
