= Simoma =

Scientific classification
- Kingdom: Animalia
- Phylum: Arthropoda
- Class: Insecta
- Order: Diptera
- Family: Tachinidae
- Subfamily: Exoristinae
- Tribe: Goniini
- Genus: Simoma; Aldrich, 1926

Type species
- Simoma grahami Aldrich, 1926

Genus of flies

Simoma is a genus of flies in the family Tachinidae.

== Species ==
- Simoma grahami Aldrich, 1926

== Distribution ==
Japan, Israel, Palestine. Namibia, China, India, Malaysia, Vietnam.
