= Minthosoma =

Scientific classification
- Kingdom: Animalia
- Phylum: Arthropoda
- Class: Insecta
- Order: Diptera
- Family: Tachinidae
- Subfamily: Exoristinae
- Tribe: Goniini
- Genus: Minthosoma; Zeegers, 2007

Type species
- Minthosoma janus Zeegers, 2007

Genus of flies

Minthosoma is a genus of flies in the family Tachinidae.

== Species ==
- Minthosoma janus Zeegers, 2007
- Minthosoma stylatum (Zeegers, 2007)
