= Isafarus =

Scientific classification
- Kingdom: Animalia
- Phylum: Arthropoda
- Class: Insecta
- Order: Diptera
- Family: Tachinidae
- Subfamily: Exoristinae
- Tribe: Goniini
- Genus: Isafarus; Richter, 1976

Type species
- Isafarus calceolus Richter, 1976

Genus of flies

Isafarus is a genus of flies in the family Tachinidae.

== Species ==
- Isafarus calceolus Richter, 1976

== Distribution ==
Mongolia.
