= Cyosoprocta =

Scientific classification
- Kingdom: Animalia
- Phylum: Arthropoda
- Class: Insecta
- Order: Diptera
- Family: Tachinidae
- Subfamily: Exoristinae
- Tribe: Goniini
- Genus: Cyosoprocta; Reinhard, 1952

Type species
- Cyosoprocta funebris Reinhard, 1952

Genus of flies

Cyosoprocta is a genus of flies in the family Tachinidae.

== Species ==
- Cyosoprocta auriceps Reinhard, 1952
- Cyosoprocta funebris Reinhard, 1952

== Distribution ==
Mexico.
