= Anamastax =

Scientific classification
- Kingdom: Animalia
- Phylum: Arthropoda
- Clade: Pancrustacea
- Class: Insecta
- Order: Diptera
- Family: Tachinidae
- Subfamily: Exoristinae
- Tribe: Goniini
- Genus: Anamastax; Brauer & von Berganstamm, 1891

Type species
- Blepharipeza goniaeformis Macquart, 1846

Genus of flies

Anamastax is a genus of flies in the family Tachinidae.

== Species ==
- Anamastax braueri (Hardy, 1938)
