= Pseudalsomyia =

Scientific classification
- Kingdom: Animalia
- Phylum: Arthropoda
- Class: Insecta
- Order: Diptera
- Family: Tachinidae
- Subfamily: Exoristinae
- Tribe: Goniini
- Genus: Pseudalsomyia; Mesnil, 1968

Type species
- Pseudalsomyia pilifacies Mesnil, 1968

Genus of flies

Pseudalsomyia is a genus of flies in the family Tachinidae.

== Species ==
- Pseudalsomyia audisoi Cerretti, 2012
- Pseudalsomyia hyrcanica Richter, 1981
- Pseudalsomyia pilifacies Mesnil, 1968
- Pseudalsomyia piligena Mesnil, 1968
