= Myxogaedia =

Scientific classification
- Kingdom: Animalia
- Phylum: Arthropoda
- Class: Insecta
- Order: Diptera
- Family: Tachinidae
- Subfamily: Exoristinae
- Tribe: Goniini
- Genus: Myxogaedia; Mesnil, 1956

Type species
- Myxarchiclops maculosus Villeneuve, 1916

Synonyms
- Gautengicesa Koçak & Kemal, 2010; Pretoriana Curran, 1938

Genus of flies

Myxogaedia is a genus of flies in the family Tachinidae.

== Species ==
- Myxogaedia maculosa (Villeneuve, 1916)
- Myxogaedia setosa (Curran, 1938)
