= Protogoniops =

Scientific classification
- Kingdom: Animalia
- Phylum: Arthropoda
- Clade: Pancrustacea
- Class: Insecta
- Order: Diptera
- Family: Tachinidae
- Subfamily: Exoristinae
- Tribe: Goniini
- Genus: Protogoniops; Townsend, 1913

Type species
- Protogonia ocellaris Townsend, 1912

Synonyms
- Protogonia Townsend, 1912

Genus of flies

Protogoniops is a genus of flies in the family Tachinidae.

== Species ==
- Protogoniops ocellaris (Townsend, 1912)

== Distribution ==
Chile, Peru.
