= Prosopodopsis =

Scientific classification
- Kingdom: Animalia
- Phylum: Arthropoda
- Clade: Pancrustacea
- Class: Insecta
- Order: Diptera
- Family: Tachinidae
- Subfamily: Exoristinae
- Tribe: Goniini
- Genus: Prosopodopsis; Townsend, 1926

Type species
- Tachina fasciata Wiedemann, 1830

Synonyms
- Orientodoria Townsend, 1933

Genus of flies

Prosopodopsis is a genus of flies in the family Tachinidae.

== Species ==
- Prosopodopsis appendiculata (Meijere, 1910)
- Prosopodopsis orbitalis (Baranov, 1938)
- Prosopodopsis orientalis (Wiedemann, 1830)
- Prosopodopsis pulchricornis (Villeneuve, 1938)
- Prosopodopsis quadrisetosa (Baranov, 1935)
- Prosopodopsis ruficornis (Chao, 2002)
