= Andesimyia =

Scientific classification
- Kingdom: Animalia
- Phylum: Arthropoda
- Class: Insecta
- Order: Diptera
- Family: Tachinidae
- Subfamily: Exoristinae
- Tribe: Goniini
- Genus: Andesimyia; Brèthes, 1909

Type species
- Andesimyia scutellata Brèthes, 1909

Genus of flies

Andesimyia is a genus of flies in the family Tachinidae.

== Species ==
- Andesimyia scutellata Brèthes, 1909

== Distribution ==
Argentina.
