= Atactopsis =

Scientific classification
- Kingdom: Animalia
- Phylum: Arthropoda
- Class: Insecta
- Order: Diptera
- Family: Tachinidae
- Subfamily: Exoristinae
- Tribe: Goniini
- Genus: Atactopsis; Townsend, 1917

Type species
- Atactopsis facialis Townsend, 1917

Synonyms
- Paratacta Reinhard, 1923

Genus of flies

Atactopsis is a genus of flies in the family Tachinidae.

== Species ==
- Atactopsis facialis Townsend, 1917
- Atactopsis reinhardi Sabrosky & Arnaud, 1965
