= Igneomyia =

Scientific classification
- Kingdom: Animalia
- Phylum: Arthropoda
- Class: Insecta
- Order: Diptera
- Family: Tachinidae
- Subfamily: Exoristinae
- Tribe: Goniini
- Genus: Igneomyia; Mesnil, 1950

Type species
- Pexopsis (Ugimeigenia) ignea Mesnil, 1944

Synonyms
- Igneomyia Mesnil, 1949

Genus of flies

Igneomyia is a genus of flies in the family Tachinidae.

== Species ==
- Igneomyia ferruginea Mesnil, 1970
- Igneomyia ignea (Mesnil, 1944)

== Distribution ==
Madagascar.
