= Quadra (fly) =

Scientific classification
- Kingdom: Animalia
- Phylum: Arthropoda
- Clade: Pancrustacea
- Class: Insecta
- Order: Diptera
- Family: Tachinidae
- Subfamily: Exoristinae
- Tribe: Goniini
- Genus: Quadra; Malloch, 1929

Genus of flies

Quadra is a monotypic genus of flies in the family Tachinidae. Its sole species, Quadra ornata is endemic to Australia.

== Species ==
- Quadra ornata Malloch, 1929

== Distribution ==
Australia.
