= Perlucidina =

Scientific classification
- Kingdom: Animalia
- Phylum: Arthropoda
- Class: Insecta
- Order: Diptera
- Family: Tachinidae
- Subfamily: Exoristinae
- Tribe: Goniini
- Genus: Perlucidina; Mesnil, 1952

Type species
- Exorista perlucida Karsch, 1886

Genus of flies

Perlucidina is a genus of flies in the family Tachinidae.

== Species ==
- Perlucidina africana (Jaennicke, 1867)
- Perlucidina perlucida (Karsch, 1886)
