= Eurygastropsis =

Scientific classification
- Kingdom: Animalia
- Phylum: Arthropoda
- Class: Insecta
- Order: Diptera
- Family: Tachinidae
- Subfamily: Exoristinae
- Tribe: Goniini
- Genus: Eurygastropsis; Townsend, 1916

Type species
- Eurigaster tasmaniae Walker, 1858

Synonyms
- Calopygidia Malloch, 1930

Genus of flies

Eurygastropsis is a genus of flies in the family Tachinidae.

== Species ==
- Eurygastropsis tasmaniae (Walker, 1858)

== Distribution ==
Australia, Papua New Guinea.
