= Pexopsis =

Scientific classification
- Kingdom: Animalia
- Phylum: Arthropoda
- Class: Insecta
- Order: Diptera
- Family: Tachinidae
- Subfamily: Exoristinae
- Tribe: Goniini
- Genus: Pexopsis; Brauer & von Berganstamm, 1889

Type species
- Pexopsis aprica Meigen, 1824

Synonyms
- Trophops Aldrich, 1932

Genus of flies

Pexopsis is a genus of flies in the family Tachinidae.

== Species ==
- Pexopsis aprica (Meigen, 1824)
- Pexopsis aurea Sun & Zhao, 1993
- Pexopsis buccalis Mesnil, 1951
- Pexopsis capitata Mesnil, 1951
- Pexopsis chapini (Curran, 1927)
- Pexopsis clauseni (Aldrich, 1932)
- Pexopsis dongchuanensis Sun & Zhao, 1993
- Pexopsis femoralis Bezzi, 1911
- Pexopsis flavipsis Sun & Zhao, 1993
- Pexopsis garambana Verbeke, 1962
- Pexopsis kyushuensis Shima, 1968
- Pexopsis lindneri Mesnil, 1959
- Pexopsis orientalis Sun & Zhao, 1993
- Pexopsis pilosa Mesnil, 1957
- Pexopsis pollinis Sun & Zhao, 1993
- Pexopsis pyrrhaspis Villeneuve, 1916
- Pexopsis rasa Mesnil, 1970
- Pexopsis shanghaiensis Sun & Zhao, 1993
- Pexopsis shanxiensis Sun & Zhao, 1993
- Pexopsis trichifacialis Sun & Zhao, 1993
- Pexopsis yakushimana Shima, 1968
- Pexopsis yemenensis Zeegers, 2007
- Pexopsis zhangi Sun & Zhao, 1993
