= Kuwanimyia =

Scientific classification
- Kingdom: Animalia
- Phylum: Arthropoda
- Clade: Pancrustacea
- Class: Insecta
- Order: Diptera
- Family: Tachinidae
- Subfamily: Exoristinae
- Tribe: Goniini
- Genus: Kuwanimyia; Townsend, 1916

Type species
- Kuwanimyia conspersa Townsend, 1916

Genus of flies

Kuwanimyia is a genus of flies in the family Tachinidae.

== Species ==
- Kuwanimyia afra Cerretti, 2009
- Kuwanimyia atra Cerretti, 2009
- Kuwanimyia capensis Cerretti, 2009
- Kuwanimyia conspersa Townsend, 1916
- Kuwanimyia zhanjiangensis Zhao, Zhang & Chen, 2012
