= Winthellia =

Scientific classification
- Kingdom: Animalia
- Phylum: Arthropoda
- Clade: Pancrustacea
- Class: Insecta
- Order: Diptera
- Family: Tachinidae
- Subfamily: Exoristinae
- Tribe: Goniini
- Genus: Winthellia; Crosskey, 1967

Type species
- Thyellina brevicornis Mesnil, 1949

Synonyms
- Thyellina Mesnil, 1949; Thysellina Edwards & Hopwood, 1966

Genus of flies

Winthellia is a genus of flies in the family Tachinidae.

== Species ==
- Winthellia brevicornis (Mesnil, 1949)

== Distribution ==
Australia.
