= Paramesochaeta =

Scientific classification
- Kingdom: Animalia
- Phylum: Arthropoda
- Class: Insecta
- Order: Diptera
- Family: Tachinidae
- Tribe: Goniini
- Genus: Paramesochaeta (Brauer & von Berganstamm, 1891
- Species: P. fuscicostalis

Binomial name
- Paramesochaeta fuscicostalis Wulp, 1890

Genus of flies

Paramesochaeta is a monotypic genus of flies in the family Tachinidae. It contains a single species Paramesochaeta fuscicostalis, described by Frederik Maurits van der Wulp in 1890

== Distribution ==
Costa Rica, Mexico.
