= Chrysophryxe =

Scientific classification
- Kingdom: Animalia
- Phylum: Arthropoda
- Class: Insecta
- Order: Diptera
- Family: Tachinidae
- Subfamily: Exoristinae
- Tribe: Goniini
- Genus: Chrysophryxe; Sellers, 1943

Type species
- Chrysophryxe tibialis Sellers, 1943

Genus of flies

Chrysophryxe is a genus of flies in the family Tachinidae.

== Species ==
- Chrysophryxe tibialis Sellers, 1943

== Distribution ==
Brazil.
