= Goniophthalmus =

Scientific classification
- Kingdom: Animalia
- Phylum: Arthropoda
- Class: Insecta
- Order: Diptera
- Family: Tachinidae
- Subfamily: Exoristinae
- Tribe: Goniini
- Genus: Goniophthalmus; Villeneuve, 1910

Type species
- Goniophthalmus simonyi Villeneuve, 1910

Genus of flies

Goniophthalmus is a genus of flies in the family Tachinidae.

== Species ==
- Goniophthalmus australis (Baranov, 1938)
- Goniophthalmus dubiosus Baranov, 1935
- Goniophthalmus frontoides Chao & Zhou, 1987
- Goniophthalmus halli (Mesnil, 1956)
- Goniophthalmus halli Mesnil, 1956
- Goniophthalmus rufescens (Baranov, 1938)
- Goniophthalmus simonyi Villeneuve, 1910
