= Stolatosoma =

Scientific classification
- Kingdom: Animalia
- Phylum: Arthropoda
- Class: Insecta
- Order: Diptera
- Family: Tachinidae
- Subfamily: Exoristinae
- Tribe: Goniini
- Genus: Stolatosoma; Reinhard, 1953

Type species
- Stolatosoma cidaris Reinhard, 1953

Genus of flies

Stolatosoma is a genus of flies in the family Tachinidae.

== Species ==
- Stolatosoma cidaris Reinhard, 1953

== Distribution ==
Mexico.
