= Arrhenomyza =

Scientific classification
- Kingdom: Animalia
- Phylum: Arthropoda
- Clade: Pancrustacea
- Class: Insecta
- Order: Diptera
- Family: Tachinidae
- Subfamily: Exoristinae
- Tribe: Goniini
- Genus: Arrhenomyza; Malloch, 1929

Type species
- Arrhenomyza conspicua Malloch, 1929

Genus of flies

Arrhenomyza is a genus of flies in the family Tachinidae.

== Species ==
- Arrhenomyza conspicua Malloch, 1929

== Distribution ==
Australia.
