= Proparachaetopsis =

Scientific classification
- Kingdom: Animalia
- Phylum: Arthropoda
- Class: Insecta
- Order: Diptera
- Family: Tachinidae
- Subfamily: Exoristinae
- Tribe: Goniini
- Genus: Proparachaetopsis; Blanchard, 1942

Type species
- Proparachaetopsis quinquevittata Blanchard, 1942

Synonyms
- Colurus Reinhard, 1953

Genus of flies

Proparachaetopsis is a genus of flies in the family Tachinidae.

== Species ==
- Proparachaetopsis capixaba Toma & Guimarães, 2000
- Proparachaetopsis carvalhoi Toma & Guimarães, 2000
- Proparachaetopsis danunciae Toma & Guimarães, 2000
- Proparachaetopsis downsi (Reinhard, 1953)
- Proparachaetopsis quinquevittata Blanchard, 1942
- Proparachaetopsis rosae Toma & Guimarães, 2000
