= Philocorus =

Scientific classification
- Kingdom: Animalia
- Phylum: Arthropoda
- Class: Insecta
- Order: Diptera
- Family: Tachinidae
- Subfamily: Exoristinae
- Tribe: Goniini
- Genus: Philocorus; Cortés, 1976

Type species
- Philocorus montanum Cortés, 1976

Genus of flies

Philocorus is a genus of flies in the family Tachinidae.

== Species ==
- Philocorus montanum Cortés, 1976

== Distribution ==
Chile.
