= Phytomypterina =

Scientific classification
- Kingdom: Animalia
- Phylum: Arthropoda
- Class: Insecta
- Order: Diptera
- Family: Tachinidae
- Subfamily: Exoristinae
- Tribe: Goniini
- Genus: Phytomypterina; Emden, 1960

Type species
- Phytomypterina burtti Emden, 1960

Genus of flies

Phytomypterina is a genus of flies in the family Tachinidae.

== Species ==
- Phytomypterina rufescens (Villeneuve, 1936)

== Distribution ==
Mozambique, South Africa, Tanzania.
