= Ptilogonia =

Scientific classification
- Kingdom: Animalia
- Phylum: Arthropoda
- Class: Insecta
- Order: Diptera
- Family: Tachinidae
- Subfamily: Exoristinae
- Tribe: Goniini
- Genus: Ptilogonia; Bischof, 1904

Genus of flies

Ptilogonia is a genus of flies in the family Tachinidae.

== Species ==
- Ptilogonia neotropica Bischof, 1904

== Distribution ==
Brazil.
