= Blepharella =

Scientific classification
- Kingdom: Animalia
- Phylum: Arthropoda
- Clade: Pancrustacea
- Class: Insecta
- Order: Diptera
- Family: Tachinidae
- Subfamily: Exoristinae
- Tribe: Goniini
- Genus: Blepharella; Macquart, 1851

Synonyms
- Afrosturmia Curran, 1927; Apilia Malloch, 1930; Biephareila Venkatesha, Krishnamoorthy Bhat & Sidde Gowda, 1993; Congochrysosoma Townsend, 1916; Phryxosturmia Townsend, 1927; Podomyia Brauer & von Berganstamm, 1889; Pujolina Mesnil, 1968

Genus of flies

Blepharella is a genus of flies in the family Tachinidae.

== Species ==
- Blepharella abana (Curran, 1927)
- Blepharella alacris (Curran, 1927)
- Blepharella analis (Curran, 1927)
- Blepharella arrogans (Curran, 1927)
- Blepharella atricauda Mesnil, 1970
- Blepharella aurifrons (Villeneuve, 1916)
- Blepharella bicolor (Mesnil, 1968)
- Blepharella carbonata Mesnil, 1952
- Blepharella chinonaspis (Bezzi, 1908)
- Blepharella confusa Mesnil, 1952
- Blepharella erebiae Mesnil, 1970
- Blepharella fallaciosa Mesnil, 1970
- Blepharella fascipes (Villeneuve, 1943)
- Blepharella fuscicosta (Curran, 1927)
- Blepharella fuscipennis (Mesnil, 1952)
- Blepharella grandis (Curran, 1927)
- Blepharella haemorrhoa Mesnil, 1970
- Blepharella hova Mesnil, 1952
- Blepharella imitator (Curran, 1927)
- Blepharella instabilis (Curran, 1927)
- Blepharella intensica (Curran, 1927)
- Blepharella laetabilis (Villeneuve, 1933)
- Blepharella lateralis Macquart, 1851
- Blepharella lodosi Mesnil, 1968
- Blepharella melita (Curran, 1927)
- Blepharella neglecta Mesnil, 1968
- Blepharella nigra Mesnil, 1967
- Blepharella oldi Mesnil, 1952
- Blepharella orbitalis (Curran, 1927)
- Blepharella pellucida Mesnil, 1970
- Blepharella perfida Mesnil, 1970
- Blepharella picturata (Curran, 1927)
- Blepharella rex (Curran, 1927)
- Blepharella rubricosa (Villeneuve, 1933)
- Blepharella ruficauda Mesnil, 1952
- Blepharella setifacies (Curran, 1927)
- Blepharella setigera (Corti, 1895)
- Blepharella seydeli (Mesnil, 1949)
- Blepharella snyderi (Townsend, 1916)
- Blepharella tenuparafacialis Chao & Shi, 1982
- Blepharella vasta (Karsch, 1886)
- Blepharella versatilis (Villeneuve, 1910)
- Blepharella vivax (Curran, 1927)
- Blepharella vulnerata (Curran, 1927)
- Blepharella xanthaspis Mesnil, 1970
