= Hystricephala =

Scientific classification
- Kingdom: Animalia
- Phylum: Arthropoda
- Class: Insecta
- Order: Diptera
- Family: Tachinidae
- Subfamily: Exoristinae
- Tribe: Goniini
- Genus: Hystricephala; Macquart, 1846

Type species
- Hystricephala nigra Macquart, 1846

Genus of flies

Hystricephala is a genus of flies in the family Tachinidae.

== Species ==
- Hystricephala nigra Macquart, 1846

== Distribution ==
South Africa.
