= Eurysthaea =

Scientific classification
- Kingdom: Animalia
- Phylum: Arthropoda
- Class: Insecta
- Order: Diptera
- Family: Tachinidae
- Subfamily: Exoristinae
- Tribe: Goniini
- Genus: Eurysthaea; Robineau-Desvoidy, 1863

Type species
- Erythrocera scutellaris Robineau-Desvoidy, 1849

Synonyms
- Caenis Robineau-Desvoidy, 1863; Discochaeta Brauer & von Berganstamm, 1889; Euristhaea Marschall, 1873

Genus of flies

Eurysthaea is a genus of flies in the family Tachinidae.

== Species ==
- Eurysthaea cinctella Mesnil, 1953
- Eurysthaea leveriana Baranov, 1934
- Eurysthaea scutellaris (Robineau-Desvoidy, 1849)
- Eurysthaea veniseta Mesnil, 1968
