= Protypophaemyia =

Scientific classification
- Kingdom: Animalia
- Phylum: Arthropoda
- Class: Insecta
- Order: Diptera
- Family: Tachinidae
- Subfamily: Exoristinae
- Tribe: Goniini
- Genus: Protypophaemyia; Blanchard, 1963

Type species
- Ypophaemyia haywardi Blanchard, 1942

Genus of flies

Protypophaemyia is a genus of flies in the family Tachinidae.

== Species ==
- Protypophaemyia haywardi (Blanchard, 1942)
- Protypophaemyia townsendi Blanchard, 1963
