= Aneogmena =

Scientific classification
- Kingdom: Animalia
- Phylum: Arthropoda
- Class: Insecta
- Order: Diptera
- Family: Tachinidae
- Subfamily: Exoristinae
- Tribe: Goniini
- Genus: Aneogmena; Brauer & von Berganstamm, 1891

Type species
- Aneogmena fischeri Brauer & von Berganstamm, 1891

Synonyms
- Platerycia Baranov, 1936; Zosteropsis Townsend, 1916

Genus of flies

Aneogmena is a genus of flies in the family Tachinidae.

== Species ==
- Aneogmena compressa (Baranov, 1936)
- Aneogmena fischeri Brauer & von Berganstamm, 1891
- Aneogmena lucifera (Walker, 1853)
- Aneogmena rutherfordi (Townsend, 1916)
- Aneogmena secunda (Villeneuve, 1929)
