= Pseudosiphosturmia =

Scientific classification
- Kingdom: Animalia
- Phylum: Arthropoda
- Class: Insecta
- Order: Diptera
- Family: Tachinidae
- Subfamily: Exoristinae
- Tribe: Goniini
- Genus: Pseudosiphosturmia; Thompson, 1966

Type species
- Pseudosiphosturmia aberrans Thompson, 1966

Genus of flies

Pseudosiphosturmia is a genus of flies in the family Tachinidae.

== Species ==
- Pseudosiphosturmia aberrans Thompson, 1966

== Distribution ==
Trinidad and Tobago.
