= Chaetocnephalia =

Scientific classification
- Kingdom: Animalia
- Phylum: Arthropoda
- Class: Insecta
- Order: Diptera
- Family: Tachinidae
- Subfamily: Exoristinae
- Tribe: Goniini
- Genus: Chaetocnephalia; Townsend, 1915

Type species
- Chaetocnephalia alpina Townsend, 1915

Genus of flies

Chaetocnephalia is a genus of flies in the family Tachinidae.

== Species ==
- Chaetocnephalia alpina Townsend, 1915
- Chaetocnephalia americana (Schiner, 1868)
- Chaetocnephalia andina Cortés & Campos, 1971
- Chaetocnephalia cortesi González, 2004
- Chaetocnephalia innupta Cortés, 1945
