= Chrysophryno =

Scientific classification
- Kingdom: Animalia
- Phylum: Arthropoda
- Class: Insecta
- Order: Diptera
- Family: Tachinidae
- Subfamily: Exoristinae
- Tribe: Goniini
- Genus: Chrysophryno; Townsend, 1927

Type species
- Chrysophryno egensis Townsend, 1927

Synonyms
- Chrysophryna Townsend, 1929

Genus of flies

Chrysophryno is a genus of flies in the family Tachinidae.

== Species ==
- Chrysophryno andinensis Townsend, 1929
- Chrysophryno egensis Townsend, 1927
