= Masistyloides =

Scientific classification
- Kingdom: Animalia
- Phylum: Arthropoda
- Clade: Pancrustacea
- Class: Insecta
- Order: Diptera
- Family: Tachinidae
- Subfamily: Exoristinae
- Tribe: Goniini
- Genus: Masistyloides; Mesnil, 1963

Type species
- Masistyloides excavatum Mesnil, 1963

Genus of flies

Masistyloides is a genus of flies in the family Tachinidae.

== Species ==
- Masistyloides excavatum Mesnil, 1963
- Masistyloides kononenkoi Richter, 1972
