= Crapivnicia =

Scientific classification
- Kingdom: Animalia
- Phylum: Arthropoda
- Class: Insecta
- Order: Diptera
- Family: Tachinidae
- Subfamily: Exoristinae
- Tribe: Goniini
- Genus: Crapivnicia; Richter, 1995

Type species
- Crapivnicia donabilis Richter, 1995

Genus of flies

Crapivnicia is a genus of flies in the family Tachinidae.

== Species ==
- Crapivnicia blaptis (Kugler, 1971)
- Crapivnicia donabilis Richter, 1995
