= Cadurcia =

Scientific classification
- Kingdom: Animalia
- Phylum: Arthropoda
- Class: Insecta
- Order: Diptera
- Family: Tachinidae
- Subfamily: Exoristinae
- Tribe: Goniini
- Genus: Cadurcia; Villeneuve, 1926

Type species
- Masicera casta Rondani, 1861

Synonyms
- Argyrophylacoides Townsend, 1933

Genus of flies

Cadurcia is a genus of flies in the family Tachinidae.

== Species ==
- Cadurcia auratocauda (Curran, 1934)
- Cadurcia borbonensis Villeneuve, 1926
- Cadurcia casta (Rondani, 1861)
- Cadurcia depressa Villeneuve, 1926
- Cadurcia fascicauda (Curran, 1934)
- Cadurcia lucens Villeneuve, 1926
- Cadurcia mesnili Verbeke, 1962
- Cadurcia plutellae Emden, 1942
- Cadurcia semiviolacea Villeneuve, 1926
- Cadurcia versicauda (Curran, 1934)
- Cadurcia vinsoni Mesnil, 1952
- Cadurcia zetterstedti (Karsch, 1886)
