= Distichona =

Scientific classification
- Kingdom: Animalia
- Phylum: Arthropoda
- Class: Insecta
- Order: Diptera
- Family: Tachinidae
- Subfamily: Exoristinae
- Tribe: Goniini
- Genus: Distichona; Wulp, 1890

Type species
- Distichona varia Wulp, 1890

Synonyms
- Aravaipa Townsend, 1919; Olenochaeta Townsend, 1892; Paragermaria Townsend, 1909; Pseudogermaria Brauer & von Berganstamm, 1891

Genus of flies

Distichona is a genus of flies in the family Tachinidae.

== Species ==
- Distichona atrophopoda (Townsend, 1919)
- Distichona auriceps Coquillett, 1904
- Distichona cubensis Curran, 1927
- Distichona discrepans (Wulp, 1890)
- Distichona georgiae (Brauer & von Berganstamm, 1891)
- Distichona kansensis (Townsend, 1892)
- Distichona peruviana (Townsend, 1928)
- Distichona varia Wulp, 1890
