= Schembria =

Scientific classification
- Kingdom: Animalia
- Phylum: Arthropoda
- Class: Insecta
- Order: Diptera
- Family: Tachinidae
- Subfamily: Exoristinae
- Tribe: Goniini
- Genus: Schembria; Rondani, 1861

Type species
- Schembria meridionalis Rondani, 1861

Genus of flies

Schembria is a genus of flies in the family Tachinidae.

== Species ==
- Schembria eldana Barraclough, 1991
- Schembria meridionalis Rondani, 1861
