= Euexorista =

Scientific classification
- Kingdom: Animalia
- Phylum: Arthropoda
- Class: Insecta
- Order: Diptera
- Family: Tachinidae
- Subfamily: Exoristinae
- Tribe: Goniini
- Genus: Euexorista; Townsend, 1912

Type species
- Tachina futilis Osten Sacken, 1887

Genus of flies

Euexorista is a genus of flies in the family Tachinidae.

== Species ==
- Euexorista obumbrata (Pandellé, 1896)
- Euexorista rebaptizata Gosseries, 1989
