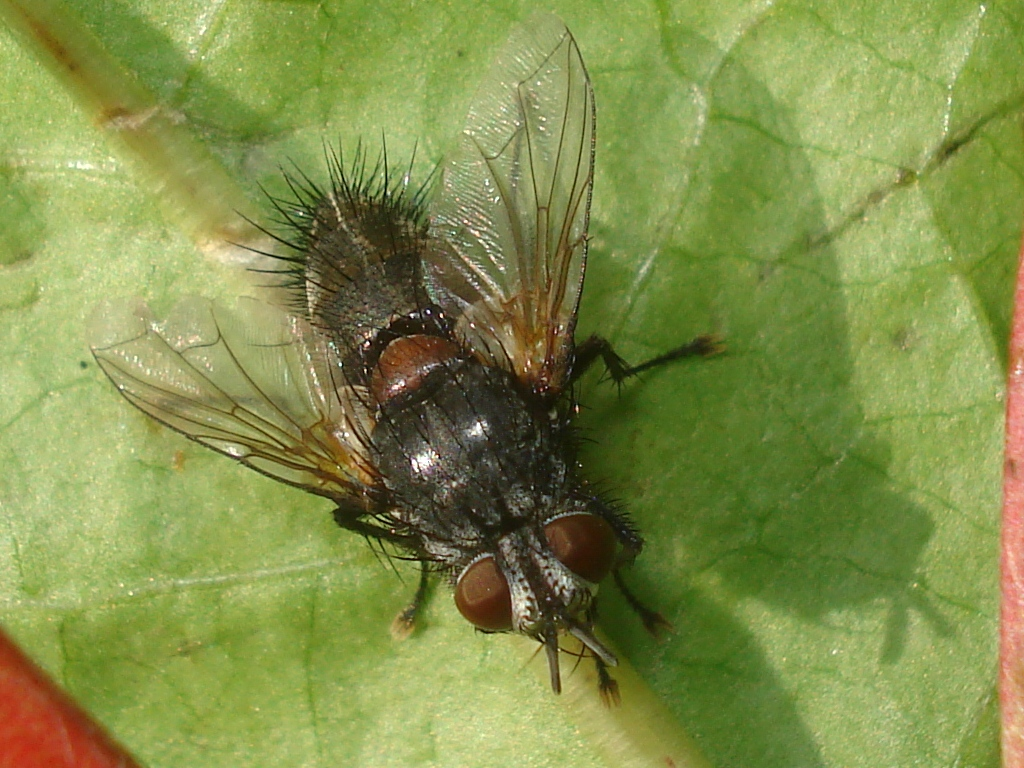
- Blepharipa pratensis

Scientific classification
- Kingdom: Animalia
- Phylum: Arthropoda
- Clade: Pancrustacea
- Class: Insecta
- Order: Diptera
- Family: Tachinidae
- Subfamily: Exoristinae
- Tribe: Goniini
- Genus: Blepharipa; Rondani, 1856

Synonyms
- Blepharipoda Brauer & von Berganstamm, 1889; Chrysopygia Townsend, 1933; Crossocomyia Bigot, 1891; Crossocosmia Mik, 1890; Crossocosmyia Bigot, 1891; Eoparachaeta Townsend, 1927; Hertingia Mesnil, 1957; Indosturmia Townsend, 1932; Sumatrosturmia Townsend, 1927; Thysanomyia Brauer & von Berganstamm, 1891; Udschimya Sasaki, 1884; Ugimyia Rondani, 1870; Verreauxia Robineau-Desvoidy, 1863

= Blepharipa =

Genus of flies

Blepharipa is a genus of flies in the family Tachinidae.

== Species ==
- Blepharipa albocincta (Mesnil, 1970)
- Blepharipa angustifrons (Mesnil, 1967)
- Blepharipa auricaudata (Townsend, 1933)
- Blepharipa auripilis (Robineau-Desvoidy, 1863)
- Blepharipa carbonata (Mesnil, 1970)
- Blepharipa chaetoparafacialis Chao, 1982
- Blepharipa chryseps (Malloch, 1935)
- Blepharipa coesiofasciata (Macquart, 1851)
- Blepharipa fulviventris (Macquart, 1851)
- Blepharipa fusiformis (Walker, 1849)
- Blepharipa jacobsoni (Townsend, 1927)
- Blepharipa latigena (Mesnil, 1970)
- Blepharipa limitarsis (Walker, 1861)
- Blepharipa manipurensis Lahiri, 2004
- Blepharipa mutans (Walker, 1861)
- Blepharipa nigrina (Mesnil, 1970)
- Blepharipa orbitalis (Townsend, 1927)
- Blepharipa pauciseta (Mesnil, 1957)
- Blepharipa paulista (Townsend, 1929)
- Blepharipa peruana (Townsend, 1929)
- Blepharipa pratensis (Meigen, 1824)
- Blepharipa schineri (Mesnil, 1939)
- Blepharipa sericariae (Rondani, 1870)
- Blepharipa sugens (Wiedemann, 1830)
- Blepharipa tibialis (Chao, 1963)
- Blepharipa wainwrighti (Baranov, 1932)
- Blepharipa zebina (Walker, 1849)
