= Anurophylla =

Scientific classification
- Kingdom: Animalia
- Phylum: Arthropoda
- Class: Insecta
- Order: Diptera
- Family: Tachinidae
- Subfamily: Exoristinae
- Tribe: Goniini
- Genus: Anurophylla; Villeneuve, 1938

Type species
- Anurophylla setosa Villeneuve, 1938

Genus of flies

Anurophylla is a genus of flies in the family Tachinidae.

== Species ==
- Anurophylla aprica (Villeneuve, 1913)

== Distribution ==
Algeria.
