= Chaetocrania =

Scientific classification
- Kingdom: Animalia
- Phylum: Arthropoda
- Class: Insecta
- Order: Diptera
- Family: Tachinidae
- Subfamily: Exoristinae
- Tribe: Goniini
- Genus: Chaetocrania; Townsend, 1915

Type species
- Spallanzania antennalis Coquillett, 1897

Genus of flies

Chaetocrania is a genus of flies in the family Tachinidae.

== Species ==
- Chaetocrania antennalis (Coquillett, 1897)

== Distribution ==
California.
