= Choeteprosopa =

Scientific classification
- Kingdom: Animalia
- Phylum: Arthropoda
- Class: Insecta
- Order: Diptera
- Family: Tachinidae
- Subfamily: Exoristinae
- Tribe: Goniini
- Genus: Choeteprosopa; Macquart, 1851

Type species
- Choeteprosopa cyanea Macquart, 1851

Synonyms
- Paragaedia Brauer & von Berganstamm, 1891; Paratactopsis Townsend, 1917

Genus of flies

Choeteprosopa is a genus of flies in the family Tachinidae.

== Species ==
- Choeteprosopa auriceps Aldrich, 1925
- Choeteprosopa cyanea Macquart, 1851
- Choeteprosopa cyaneiventris (Macquart, 1846)
- Choeteprosopa hedemanni (Brauer & von Berganstamm, 1891)
