= Chaetophorocera =

Scientific classification
- Kingdom: Animalia
- Phylum: Arthropoda
- Class: Insecta
- Order: Diptera
- Family: Tachinidae
- Subfamily: Exoristinae
- Tribe: Goniini
- Genus: Chaetophorocera; Townsend, 1912

Type species
- Chaetophorocera andina Townsend, 1912

Genus of flies

Chaetophorocera is a genus of flies in the family Tachinidae.

== Species ==
- Chaetophorocera andina Townsend, 1912
- Chaetophorocera fuscosa Townsend, 1912
