= Trepophrys =

Scientific classification
- Kingdom: Animalia
- Phylum: Arthropoda
- Class: Insecta
- Order: Diptera
- Family: Tachinidae
- Subfamily: Exoristinae
- Tribe: Goniini
- Genus: Trepophrys; Townsend, 1908

Type species
- Trepophrys cinerea Townsend, 1908

Synonyms
- Trepophryx Guimarães, 1971

Genus of flies

Trepophrys is a genus of flies in the family Tachinidae.

== Species ==
- Trepophrys cinerea Townsend, 1908

== Distribution ==
Mexico.
