= Lydellina =

Scientific classification
- Kingdom: Animalia
- Phylum: Arthropoda
- Class: Insecta
- Order: Diptera
- Family: Tachinidae
- Subfamily: Exoristinae
- Tribe: Goniini
- Genus: Lydellina; Villeneuve, 1916

Type species
- Masicera caffra Macquart, 1846

Synonyms
- Euproctimyia Villeneuve, 1921

Genus of flies

Lydellina is a genus of flies in the family Tachinidae.

== Species ==
- Lydellina anorbitalis Mesnil, 1970
- Lydellina distincta Mesnil, 1970
- Lydellina frontalis Mesnil, 1970
- Lydellina pyrrhaspis (Villeneuve, 1921)
- Lydellina umbripennis Mesnil, 1970
- Lydellina villeneuvei Townsend, 1933
