= Thysanopsis =

Scientific classification
- Kingdom: Animalia
- Phylum: Arthropoda
- Class: Insecta
- Order: Diptera
- Family: Tachinidae
- Subfamily: Exoristinae
- Tribe: Goniini
- Genus: Thysanopsis; Townsend, 1917

Type species
- Thysanopsis albicauda Townsend, 1917

Genus of flies

Thysanopsis is a genus of flies in the family Tachinidae.

== Species ==
- Thysanopsis albicauda Townsend, 1917
- Thysanopsis guimai Toma, 2001
