= Myatelemus =

Scientific classification
- Kingdom: Animalia
- Phylum: Arthropoda
- Class: Insecta
- Order: Diptera
- Family: Tachinidae
- Subfamily: Exoristinae
- Tribe: Goniini
- Genus: Myatelemus; Reinhard, 1967

Type species
- Telemus trossulus Reinhard, 1967

Synonyms
- Telemus Reinhard, 1967

Genus of flies

Myatelemus is a genus of flies in the family Tachinidae.

== Species ==
- Myatelemus trossulus (Reinhard, 1967)

== Distribution ==
United States.
