= Zebromyia =

Scientific classification
- Kingdom: Animalia
- Phylum: Arthropoda
- Clade: Pancrustacea
- Class: Insecta
- Order: Diptera
- Family: Tachinidae
- Subfamily: Exoristinae
- Tribe: Goniini
- Genus: Zebromyia; Malloch, 1929

Type species
- Zebromyia obesa Malloch, 1929

Genus of flies

Zebromyia is a genus of flies in the family Tachinidae.

== Species ==
- Zebromyia ornata (Macquart, 1851)

== Distribution ==
Australia.
