= Gonistylum =

Scientific classification
- Kingdom: Animalia
- Phylum: Arthropoda
- Class: Insecta
- Order: Diptera
- Family: Tachinidae
- Subfamily: Exoristinae
- Tribe: Goniini
- Genus: Gonistylum; Macquart, 1851

Type species
- Gonistylum ruficorne Macquart, 1851

Synonyms
- Gonystylum Macquart, 1851

Genus of flies

Gonistylum is a genus of flies in the family Tachinidae.

== Species ==
- Gonistylum ruficorne Macquart, 1851

== Distribution ==
Argentina, Brazil.
