= Coscaronia =

Scientific classification
- Kingdom: Animalia
- Phylum: Arthropoda
- Class: Insecta
- Order: Diptera
- Family: Tachinidae
- Subfamily: Exoristinae
- Tribe: Goniini
- Genus: Coscaronia; Cortés, 1979

Type species
- Coscaronia atrogonia Cortés, 1979

Genus of flies

Coscaronia is a genus of flies in the family Tachinidae.

== Species ==
- Coscaronia antennalis Cortés, 1986
- Coscaronia atrogonia Cortés, 1979
- Coscaronia propinqua Cortés, 1979
