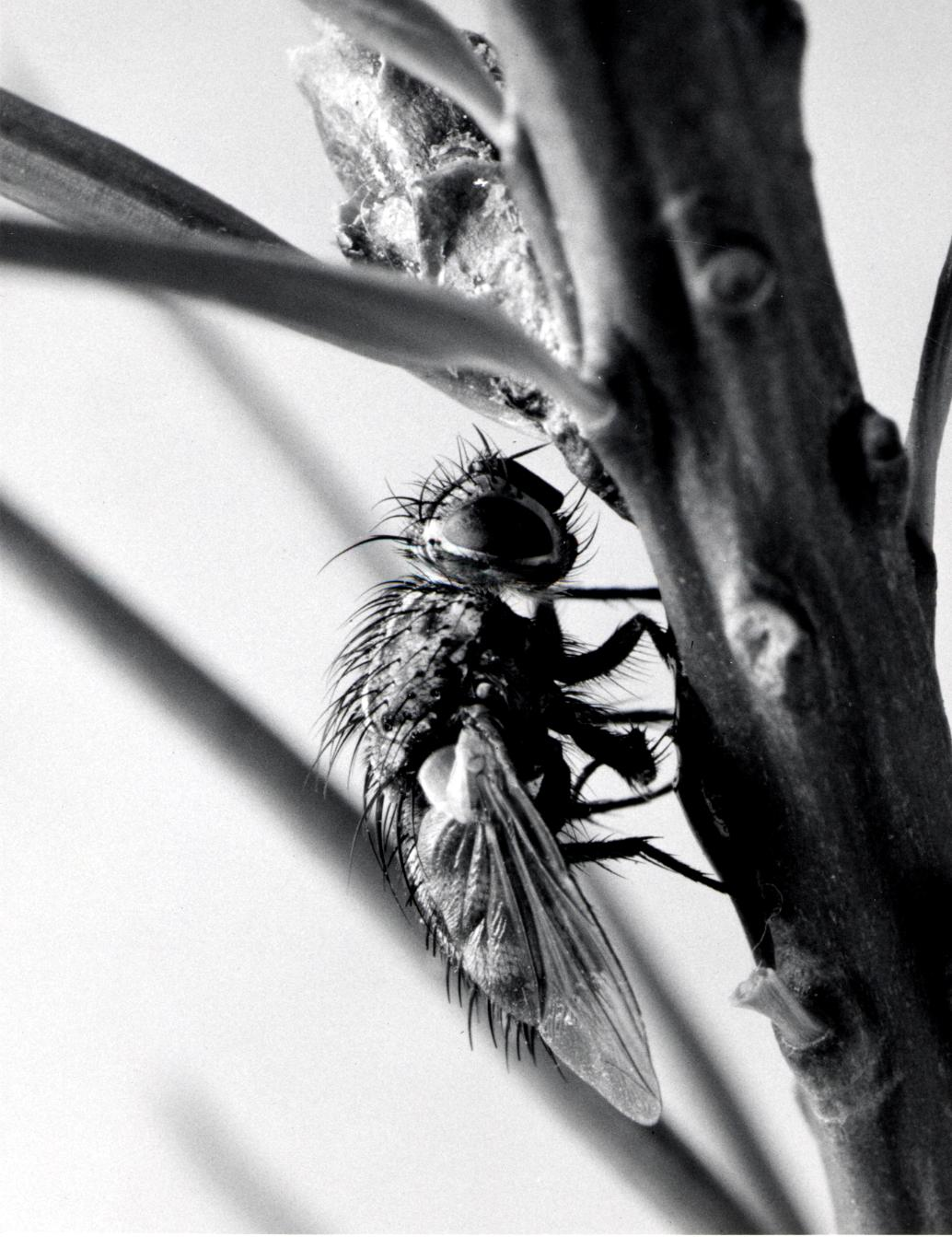
- Ceromasia auricaudata

Scientific classification
- Kingdom: Animalia
- Phylum: Arthropoda
- Class: Insecta
- Order: Diptera
- Family: Tachinidae
- Subfamily: Exoristinae
- Tribe: Goniini
- Genus: Ceromasia; Rondani, 1856

Type species
- Masicera florum Macquart, 1851

Synonyms
- Edesia Robineau-Desvoidy, 1863; Loevia Robineau-Desvoidy, 1863

= Ceromasia =

Genus of flies

Ceromasia is a genus of flies in the family Tachinidae.

== Species ==
- Ceromasia auricaudata Townsend, 1908
- Ceromasia hybreas (Walker, 1849)
- Ceromasia rubrifrons (Macquart, 1834)
