= Ramonella =

Scientific classification
- Kingdom: Animalia
- Phylum: Arthropoda
- Class: Insecta
- Order: Diptera
- Family: Tachinidae
- Subfamily: Exoristinae
- Tribe: Goniini
- Genus: Ramonella; Kugler, 1980

Type species
- Ramona mesnili Kugler, 1980

Synonyms
- Ramona Kugler, 1980

Genus of flies

Ramonella is a genus of flies in the family Tachinidae.

== Species ==
- Ramonella mesnili (Kugler, 1980)

== Distribution ==
Turkey, Israel, Canary Islands, Egypt. Yemen.
