= Eumeella =

Scientific classification
- Kingdom: Animalia
- Phylum: Arthropoda
- Class: Insecta
- Order: Diptera
- Family: Tachinidae
- Subfamily: Exoristinae
- Tribe: Goniini
- Genus: Eumeella; Mesnil, 1939

Type species
- Exorista perdives Villeneuve, 1926

Genus of flies

Eumeella is a genus of flies in the family Tachinidae.'

== Species ==
- Eumeella latifrons Chao & Zhou, 1996
- Eumeella perdives (Villeneuve, 1926)
