= Botria =

Scientific classification
- Kingdom: Animalia
- Phylum: Arthropoda
- Clade: Pancrustacea
- Class: Insecta
- Order: Diptera
- Family: Tachinidae
- Subfamily: Exoristinae
- Tribe: Goniini
- Genus: Botria; Rondani, 1856

Type species
- Botria pascuorum Rondani, 1856

Synonyms
- Bothria Rondani, 1856; Chariclea Robineau-Desvoidy, 1863; Chariclaea Robineau-Desvoidy, 1863; Anameriania Zimin, 1960

Genus of flies

Botria is a genus of flies in the family Tachinidae.

== Species ==
- Botria clarinigra Chao & Liu, 1998
- Botria frontosa (Meigen, 1824)
- Botria japonica (Mesnil, 1957)
- Botria subalpina Villeneuve, 1910
