= Eleodiphaga =

Scientific classification
- Kingdom: Animalia
- Phylum: Arthropoda
- Class: Insecta
- Order: Diptera
- Family: Tachinidae
- Subfamily: Exoristinae
- Tribe: Goniini
- Genus: Eleodiphaga; Walton, 1918

Type species
- Eleodiphaga caffreyi Walton, 1918

Genus of flies

Eleodiphaga is a genus of flies in the family Tachinidae.

== Species ==
- Eleodiphaga caffreyi Walton, 1918
- Eleodiphaga martini Reinhard, 1937
- Eleodiphaga pollinosa Walton, 1918
