= Blepharellina =

Scientific classification
- Kingdom: Animalia
- Phylum: Arthropoda
- Clade: Pancrustacea
- Class: Insecta
- Order: Diptera
- Family: Tachinidae
- Subfamily: Exoristinae
- Tribe: Goniini
- Genus: Blepharellina; Mesnil, 1952

Type species
- Blepharellina picta Mesnil, 1952

Genus of flies

Blepharellina is a genus of flies in the family Tachinidae.

== Species ==
- Blepharellina picta (Mesnil, 1952)

== Distribution ==
Nigeria.
