= Belvosiomimops =

Scientific classification
- Kingdom: Animalia
- Phylum: Arthropoda
- Class: Insecta
- Order: Diptera
- Family: Tachinidae
- Subfamily: Exoristinae
- Tribe: Goniini
- Genus: Belvosiomimops; Townsend, 1935

Type species
- Belvosiomimops barbiellinii Townsend, 1935

Genus of flies

Belvosiomimops is a genus of bristle flies in the family Tachinidae.

== Species ==
- Belvosiomimops barbiellinii Townsend, 1935

== Distribution ==
Brazil
