= Chlorolydella =

Scientific classification
- Kingdom: Animalia
- Phylum: Arthropoda
- Class: Insecta
- Order: Diptera
- Family: Tachinidae
- Subfamily: Exoristinae
- Tribe: Goniini
- Genus: Chlorolydella; Townsend, 1933

Type species
- Chlorolydella caffrariae Townsend, 1933

Synonyms
- Brachychaetoides Mesnil, 1970; Chlorophryno Townsend, 1933

Genus of flies

Chlorolydella is a genus of flies in the family Tachinidae.

== Species ==
- Chlorolydella bequaerti (Curran, 1940)
- Chlorolydella caffrariae Townsend, 1933
- Chlorolydella glauca (Karsch, 1886)
- Chlorolydella pallidipes (Curran, 1927)
- Chlorolydella pulchricornis (Villeneuve, 1938)
- Chlorolydella schistacea Mesnil, 1955
- Chlorolydella trochanterata (Villeneuve, 1934)
- Chlorolydella varipes Mesnil, 1970
- Chlorolydella venusta (Curran, 1928)
