= Mesnilius =

Scientific classification
- Kingdom: Animalia
- Phylum: Arthropoda
- Clade: Pancrustacea
- Class: Insecta
- Order: Diptera
- Family: Tachinidae
- Subfamily: Exoristinae
- Tribe: Goniini
- Genus: Mesnilius; Özdikmen, 2006

Type species
- Paragonia portentosus Mesnil, 1950

Synonyms
- Paragonia Mesnil, 1950

Genus of flies

Mesnilius is a genus of flies in the family Tachinidae.

== Species ==
- Mesnilius portentosus (Mesnil, 1950)

== Distribution ==
Australia.
