= Arama (fly) =

Scientific classification
- Kingdom: Animalia
- Phylum: Arthropoda
- Clade: Pancrustacea
- Class: Insecta
- Order: Diptera
- Family: Tachinidae
- Subfamily: Exoristinae
- Tribe: Goniini
- Genus: Arama; Richter, 1972

Type species
- Arama gobica Richter, 1972

Genus of flies

Arama is a genus of flies in the family Tachinidae.

== Species ==
- Arama gobica Richter, 1972

== Distribution ==
Mongolia.
