= Erynnia =

Scientific classification
- Kingdom: Animalia
- Phylum: Arthropoda
- Clade: Pancrustacea
- Class: Insecta
- Order: Diptera
- Family: Tachinidae
- Subfamily: Exoristinae
- Tribe: Goniini
- Genus: Erynnia; Robineau-Desvoidy, 1830

Type species
- Erynnia nitida Robineau-Desvoidy, 1830

Synonyms
- Erinnia Rondani, 1856; Erinnya Agassiz, 1846; Tortriciophaga Townsend, 1916; Vanzemia Robineau-Desvoidy, 1863

Genus of flies

Erynnia is a genus of flies in the family Tachinidae.

== Species ==
- Erynnia condecens Reinhard, 1969
- Erynnia coracina Reinhard, 1969
- Erynnia micida Reinhard, 1969
- Erynnia ocypterata (Fallén, 1810)
- Erynnia tortricis (Coquillett, 1895)
- Erynnia tricincta Reinhard, 1969
