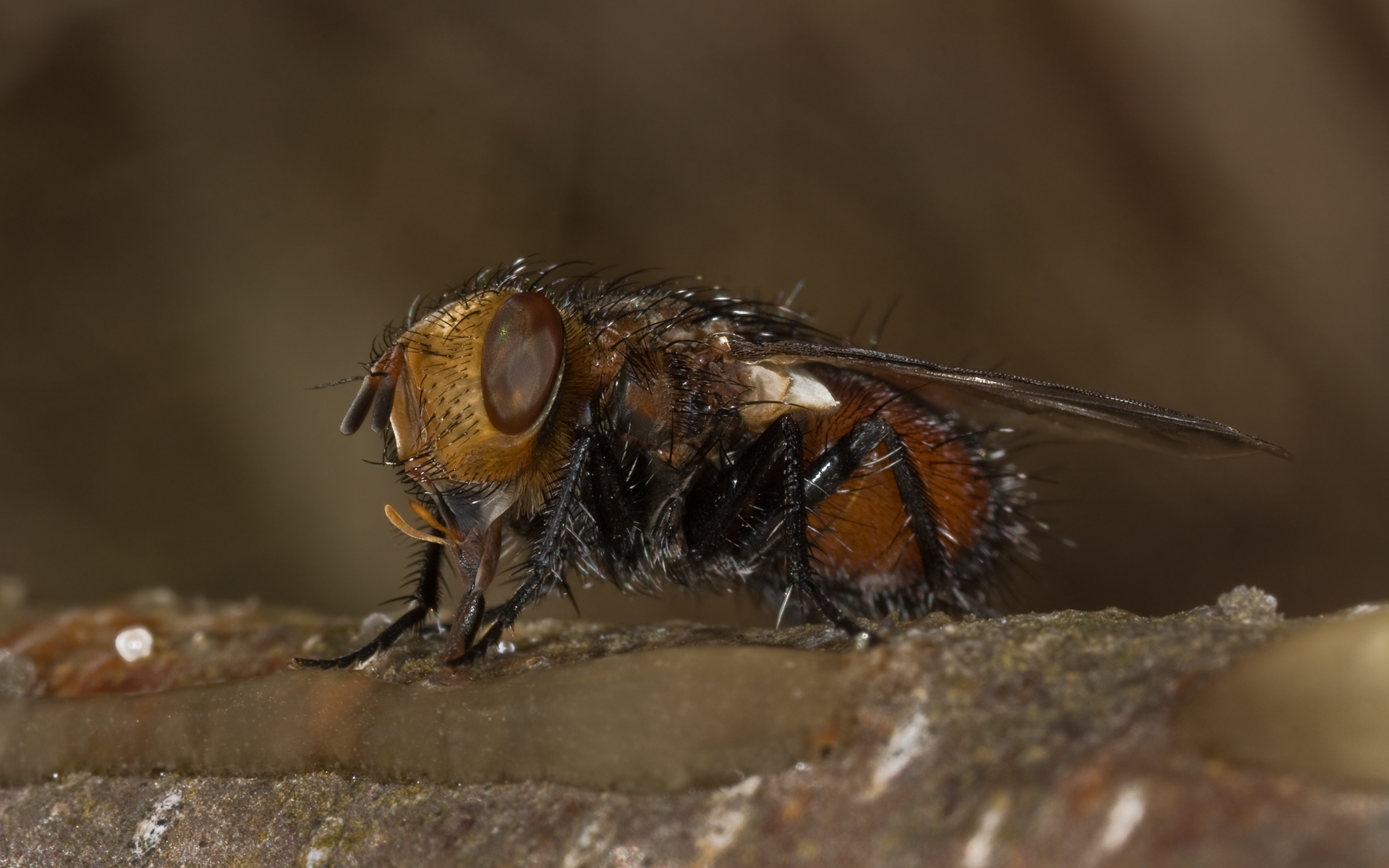
- Gonia capitata

Scientific classification
- Kingdom: Animalia
- Phylum: Arthropoda
- Class: Insecta
- Order: Diptera
- Family: Tachinidae
- Subfamily: Exoristinae
- Tribe: Goniini; Lioy, 1864

= Goniini =

Tribe of flies

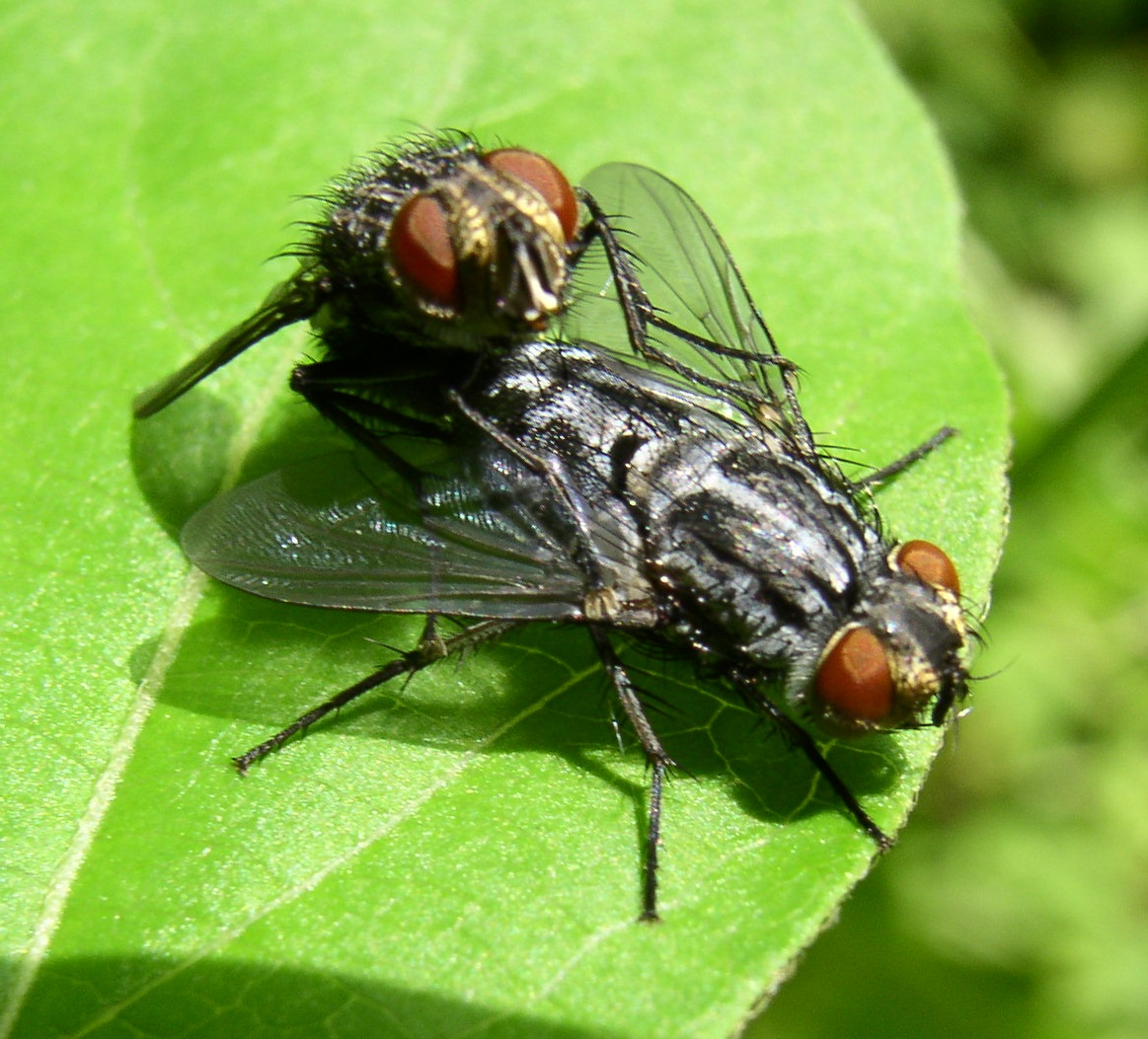
Goniini mating flies

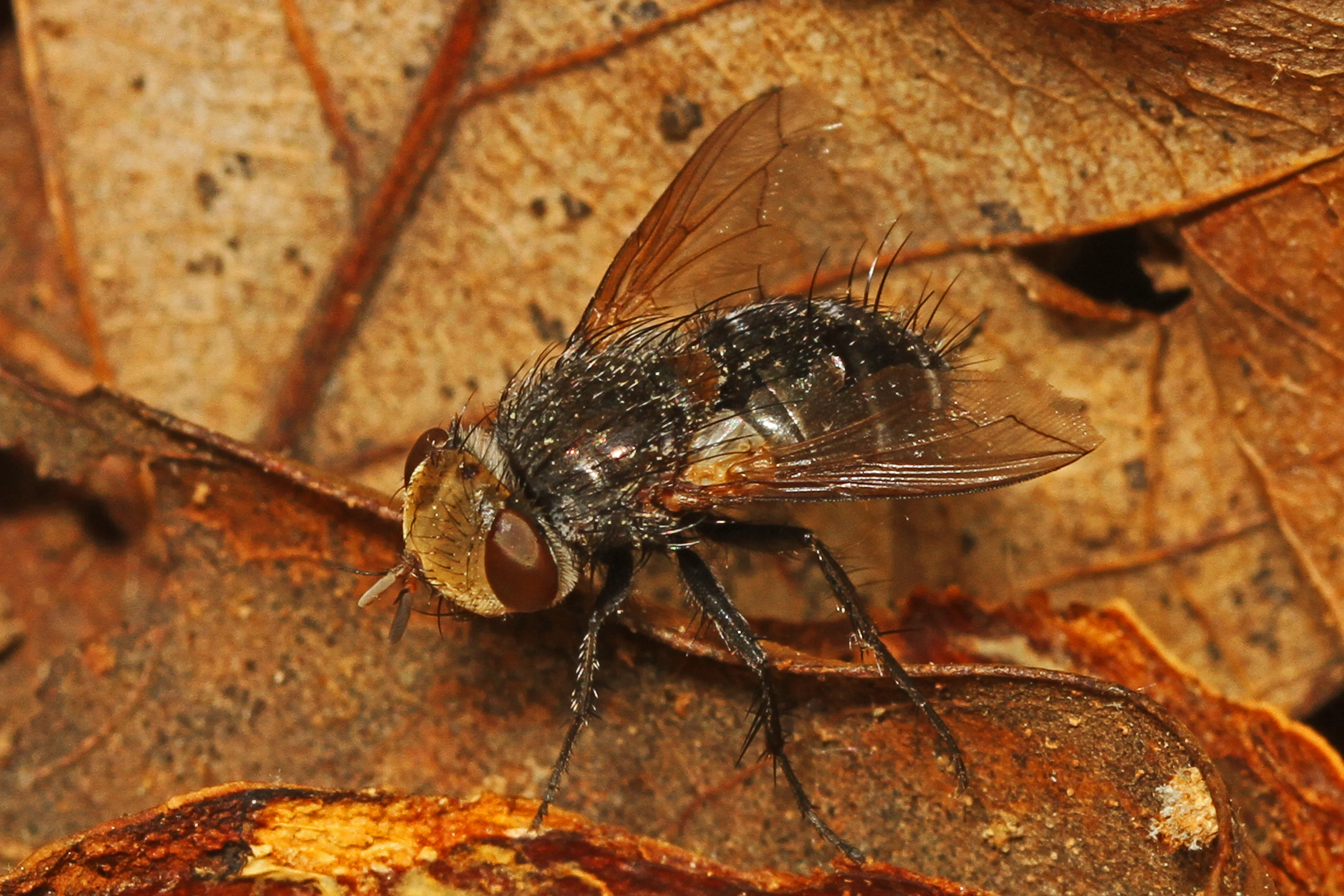
Gonia sp.

Goniini is a tribe of parasitoid flies in the family Tachinidae. Members of Goniini are distinguished from other Tachinidae by laying small "microtype" eggs that hatch only after being ingested by a host.

== Genera ==
- Agaedioxenis Villeneuve, 1939
- Allophorocera Hendel, 1901
- Allosturmia Blanchard, 1958
- Anamastax Brauer & von Bergenstamm, 1891
- Andesimyia Brèthes, 1909
- Aneogmena Brauer & von Bergenstamm, 1891
- Antistaseopsis Townsend, 1934
- Anurophylla Villeneuve, 1938
- Aplomyodoria Townsend, 1928
- Arama Richter, 1972
- Araucogonia Cortés, 1976
- Araucosimus Aldrich, 1934
- Argyrophylax Brauer & von Bergenstamm, 1889
- Arrhenomyza Malloch, 1929
- Atacta Schiner, 1868
- Atactopsis Townsend, 1917
- Atactosturmia Townsend, 1915
- Atractocerops Townsend, 1916
- Baumhaueria Meigen, 1838
- Belvosia Robineau-Desvoidy, 1830
- Belvosiomimops Townsend, 1935
- Blepharella Macquart, 1851
- Blepharellina Mesnil, 1952
- Blephariatacta Townsend, 1931
- Blepharipa Rondani, 1856
- Blepharopoda Rondani In Osculati, 1850
- Botria Rondani, 1856
- Bourquinia Blanchard, 1935
- Brachicheta Rondani, 1861
- Brachybelvosia Townsend, 1927
- Brachychaetoides Mesnil, 1970
- Brachycnephalia Townsend, 1927
- Cadurcia Villeneuve, 1926
- Caeniopsis Townsend, 1927
- Caltagironea Cortés & Campos, 1974
- Camptophryno Townsend, 1927
- Carceliella Baranov, 1934
- Ceratochaetops Mesnil, 1970
- Ceromasia Rondani, 1856
- Chaetocnephalia Townsend, 1915
- Chaetocrania Townsend, 1915
- Chaetocraniopsis Townsend, 1915
- Chaetogaedia Brauer & von Bergenstamm, 1891
- Chaetoglossa Townsend, 1892
- Chaetophorocera Townsend, 1912
- Chaetosturmia Villeneuve, 1915
- Chlorolydella Townsend, 1933
- Chloropales Mesnil, 1950
- Choeteprosopa Macquart, 1851
- Chrysoexorista Townsend, 1915
- Chrysophryno Townsend, 1927
- Chrysophryxe Sellers, 1943
- Chrysotryphera Townsend, 1935
- Clemelis Robineau-Desvoidy, 1863
- Cnephalodes Townsend, 1911
- Coscaronia Cortés, 1979
- Crapivnicia Richter, 1995
- Crosskeya Shima & Chao, 1988
- Cubaemyiopsis Thompson, 1963
- Cylindromasicera Townsend, 1915
- Cyosoprocta Reinhard, 1952
- Cyzenis Robineau-Desvoidy, 1863
- Datvia Richter, 1972
- Distichona Wulp, 1890
- Dolichocnephalia Townsend, 1915
- Dolichocolon Brauer & von Bergenstamm, 1889
- Dolichogonia Townsend, 1915
- Eleodiphaga Walton, 1918
- Elodia Robineau-Desvoidy, 1863
- Enchomyia Aldrich, 1934
- Erynnia Robineau-Desvoidy, 1830
- Erythrocera Robineau-Desvoidy, 1849
- Euceromasia Townsend, 1912
- Eucnephalia Townsend, 1892
- Euexorista Townsend, 1912
- Euloewiodoria Townsend, 1927
- Eumea Robineau-Desvoidy, 1863
- Eumeella Mesnil, 1939
- Eurygastropsis Townsend, 1916
- Eurysthaea Robineau-Desvoidy, 1863
- Eurythemyia Reinhard, 1967
- Frontina Meigen, 1838
- Frontiniella Townsend, 1918
- Frontocnephalia Townsend, 1916
- Gaedia Meigen, 1838
- Gaediophanopsis Blanchard, 1954
- Gaediopsis Brauer & von Bergenstamm, 1891
- Germariopsis Townsend, 1915
- Gonia Meigen, 1803
- Goniophthalmus Villeneuve, 1910
- Gonistylum Macquart, 1851
- Hapalioloemus Baranov, 1934
- Harrisia Robineau-Desvoidy, 1830
- Hebia Robineau-Desvoidy, 1830
- Hesperomyia Brauer & von Bergenstamm, 1889
- Houghia Coquillett, 1897
- Hypertrophomma Townsend, 1915
- Hyphantrophaga Townsend, 1892
- Hystricephala Macquart, 1846
- Igneomyia Mesnil, 1950
- Isafarus Richter, 1976
- Itacnephalia Townsend, 1927
- Itasturmia Townsend, 1927
- Kuwanimyia Townsend, 1916
- Leschenaultia Robineau-Desvoidy, 1830
- Lydellina Villeneuve, 1916
- Macropatelloa Townsend, 1931
- Manola Richter, 1982
- Masicera Macquart, 1834
- Masistyloides Mesnil, 1963
- Masistylum Brauer & von Bergenstamm, 1893
- Mayodistichona Townsend, 1928
- Mendelssohnia Kugler, 1971
- Mesnilius Özdikmen, 2006
- Metopiopsis Vimmer & Soukup, 1940
- Minthosoma Zeegers, 2007
- Moreiria Townsend, 1932
- Myatelemus Reinhard, 1967
- Myiosturmiopsis Thompson, 1963
- Mystacella Wulp, 1890
- Myxarchiclops Villeneuve, 1916
- Myxexoristops Townsend, 1911
- Myxogaedia Mesnil, 1956
- Myxophryxe Cerretti & O’Hara, 2016
- Nealsomyia Mesnil, 1939
- Neopodomyia Townsend, 1927
- Ocytata Gistel, 1848
- Onychogonia Brauer & von Bergenstamm, 1889
- Opsosturmia Townsend, 1927
- Oraphasmophaga Reinhard, 1958
- Otomasicera Townsend, 1912
- Pachystylum Macquart, 1848
- Pales Robineau-Desvoidy, 1830
- Palesisa Villeneuve, 1929
- Palia Curran, 1927
- Paliana Curran, 1927
- Palpozenillia Townsend, 1934
- Paramesochaeta Brauer & von Bergenstamm, 1891
- Parapexopsis Mesnil, 1953
- Paraphasmophaga Townsend, 1915
- Paravibrissina Shima, 1979
- Patelloa Townsend, 1916
- Peracroglossa Townsend, 1931
- Perlucidina Mesnil, 1952
- Pexopsis Brauer & von Bergenstamm, 1889
- Phasiatacta Townsend, 1911
- Phasmofrontina Townsend, 1931
- Philocorus Cortés, 1976
- Phryno Robineau-Desvoidy, 1830
- Phrynotachina Townsend, 1927
- Phyllaristomyia Townsend, 1931
- Phytomypterina Van Emden, 1960
- Pimelimyia Mesnil, 1949
- Plagimasicera Townsend, 1915
- Platymya Robineau-Desvoidy, 1830
- Polychaeta Macquart, 1851
- Proparachaeta Townsend, 1928
- Proparachaetopsis Blanchard, 1942
- Prosopea Rondani, 1861
- Prosopodopsis Townsend, 1926
- Prospherysa Wulp, 1890
- Protogoniops Townsend, 1913
- Protogoniopsis Townsend, 1915
- Protypophaemyia Blanchard, 1963
- Pseudalsomyia Mesnil, 1968
- Pseudochaeta Coquillett, 1895
- Pseudogonia Brauer & von Bergenstamm, 1889
- Pseudosiphosturmia Thompson, 1966
- Pterotopeza Townsend, 1908
- Ptilogonia Bischof, 1904
- Quadra Malloch, 1929
- Ramonella Kugler, 1980
- Rhacodinella Mesnil, 1968
- Rhinomyodes Townsend, 1933
- Rhynchogonia Brauer & von Bergenstamm, 1893
- Ricosia Curran, 1927
- Scaphimyia Mesnil, 1955
- Schembria Rondani, 1861
- Sericozenillia Mesnil, 1957
- Simoma Aldrich, 1926
- Spallanzania Robineau-Desvoidy, 1830
- Stiremania Cerretti & O’Hara, 2016
- Stolatosoma Reinhard, 1953
- Sturmia Robineau-Desvoidy, 1830
- Sturmiellina Thompson, 1963
- Sturmimasiphya Townsend, 1935
- Suensonomyia Mesnil, 1953
- Synamphichaeta Villeneuve, 1936
- Takanomyia Mesnil, 1957
- Tasmaniomyia Townsend, 1916
- Thelairosoma Villeneuve, 1916
- Thelymorpha Brauer & von Bergenstamm, 1889
- Thysanopsis Townsend, 1917
- Torosomyia Reinhard, 1935
- Trepophrys Townsend, 1908
- Tritaxys Macquart, 1847
- Trixomorpha Brauer & von Bergenstamm, 1889
- Tunapunia Thompson, 1963
- Ucayalimyia Townsend, 1927
- Ugimeigenia Townsend, 1916
- Vibrissovoria Townsend, 1919
- Winthellia Crosskey, 1967
- Zebromyia Malloch, 1929
- Zenillia Robineau-Desvoidy, 1830
