= Notodytes variabilis =

Scientific classification
- Kingdom: Animalia
- Phylum: Arthropoda
- Class: Insecta
- Order: Diptera
- Family: Tachinidae
- Subfamily: Dexiinae
- Tribe: Dexiini
- Genus: Notodytes
- Species: N. variabilis

Binomial name
- Notodytes variabilis Aldrich, 1934

Species of fly

Notodytes variabilis is a species of fly in the family Tachinidae.

== Distribution ==
Argentina.
