= Morphodexia nigra =

Scientific classification
- Kingdom: Animalia
- Phylum: Arthropoda
- Class: Insecta
- Order: Diptera
- Family: Tachinidae
- Subfamily: Dexiinae
- Tribe: Dexiini
- Genus: Morphodexia
- Species: M. nigra

Binomial name
- Morphodexia nigra Aldrich, 1934

Species of fly

Morphodexia nigra is a species of fly in the family Tachinidae.

== Distribution ==
Argentina, Chile.
