= Morphodexia barrosi =

Scientific classification
- Kingdom: Animalia
- Phylum: Arthropoda
- Class: Insecta
- Order: Diptera
- Family: Tachinidae
- Subfamily: Dexiinae
- Tribe: Dexiini
- Genus: Morphodexia
- Species: M. barrosi

Binomial name
- Morphodexia barrosi (Brèthes, 1920)

Synonyms
- Camarona barrosi Brèthes, 1920; Morphodexia microphthalmoides Townsend, 1931

Species of fly

Morphodexia barrosi is a species of fly in the family Tachinidae.

== Distribution ==
Argentina, Chile.
