= Coracomyia crassicornis =

Scientific classification
- Kingdom: Animalia
- Phylum: Arthropoda
- Class: Insecta
- Order: Diptera
- Family: Tachinidae
- Subfamily: Dexiinae
- Tribe: Voriini
- Genus: Coracomyia
- Species: C. crassicornis

Binomial name
- Coracomyia crassicornis Aldrich, 1934

Species of fly

Coracomyia crassicornis is a species of fly in the family Tachinidae.

== Distribution ==
Argentina, Chile.
