= Tyreomma muscinum =

Scientific classification
- Kingdom: Animalia
- Phylum: Arthropoda
- Class: Insecta
- Order: Diptera
- Family: Tachinidae
- Subfamily: Dexiinae
- Tribe: Dexiini
- Genus: Tyreomma
- Species: T. muscinum

Binomial name
- Tyreomma muscinum Wulp, 1896

Synonyms
- Eutheresiops trixoides Townsend, 1917

Species of fly

Tyreomma muscinum is a species of fly in the family Tachinidae.

== Distribution ==
Mexico.
