= Paulipalpus zentae =

Scientific classification
- Kingdom: Animalia
- Phylum: Arthropoda
- Clade: Pancrustacea
- Class: Insecta
- Order: Diptera
- Family: Tachinidae
- Subfamily: Dexiinae
- Tribe: Dexiini
- Genus: Paulipalpus
- Species: P. zentae

Binomial name
- Paulipalpus zentae Barraclough, 1992

Species of fly

Paulipalpus zentae is a species of fly in the family Tachinidae.

== Distribution ==
Australia.
