= Philippodexia longipes =

Scientific classification
- Kingdom: Animalia
- Phylum: Arthropoda
- Class: Insecta
- Order: Diptera
- Family: Tachinidae
- Subfamily: Dexiinae
- Tribe: Dexiini
- Genus: Philippodexia
- Species: P. longipes

Binomial name
- Philippodexia longipes Townsend, 1926

Synonyms
- Philippodexia major Malloch, 1935; Philippodexia separata Malloch, 1935

Species of fly

Philippodexia longipes is a species of fly in the family Tachinidae.

== Distribution ==
Borneo, Sulawesi, Malaysia, Philippines.
