= Epigrimyia polita =

Scientific classification
- Kingdom: Animalia
- Phylum: Arthropoda
- Class: Insecta
- Order: Diptera
- Family: Tachinidae
- Subfamily: Dexiinae
- Tribe: Epigrimyiini
- Genus: Epigrimyia
- Species: E. polita

Binomial name
- Epigrimyia polita Townsend, 1891

Species of fly

Epigrimyia polita is a species of bristle fly in the family Tachinidae. It is a parasitoid of adult Galgupha ovalis bugs.

== Distribution ==
United States
