= Platyrrhinodexia punctulata =

Scientific classification
- Kingdom: Animalia
- Phylum: Arthropoda
- Class: Insecta
- Order: Diptera
- Family: Tachinidae
- Subfamily: Dexiinae
- Tribe: Dexiini
- Genus: Platyrrhinodexia
- Species: P. punctulata

Binomial name
- Platyrrhinodexia punctulata Townsend, 1927

Species of fly

Sturmiodexia punctulata is a species of fly in the family Tachinidae.

== Distribution ==
Brazil.
