= Prophorostoma pulchrum =

Scientific classification
- Kingdom: Animalia
- Phylum: Arthropoda
- Class: Insecta
- Order: Diptera
- Family: Tachinidae
- Subfamily: Dexiinae
- Tribe: Dexiini
- Genus: Prophorostoma
- Species: P. pulchrum

Binomial name
- Prophorostoma pulchrum Townsend, 1927

Species of fly

Prophorostoma pulchrum is a species of fly in the family Tachinidae.

== Distribution ==
Brazil.
