= Effusimentum triangulum =

Scientific classification
- Kingdom: Animalia
- Phylum: Arthropoda
- Clade: Pancrustacea
- Class: Insecta
- Order: Diptera
- Family: Tachinidae
- Subfamily: Dexiinae
- Tribe: Dexiini
- Genus: Effusimentum
- Species: E. triangulum

Binomial name
- Effusimentum triangulum Barraclough, 1992

Species of fly

Effusimentum triangulum is a species of fly in the family Tachinidae.

== Distribution ==
Australia.
