= Prorhynchops bilimeki =

Scientific classification
- Kingdom: Animalia
- Phylum: Arthropoda
- Class: Insecta
- Order: Diptera
- Family: Tachinidae
- Subfamily: Dexiinae
- Tribe: Dexiini
- Genus: Prorhynchops
- Species: P. bilimeki

Binomial name
- Prorhynchops bilimeki Brauer & von Berganstamm, 1891

Species of fly

Prorhynchops bilimeki is a species of fly in the family Tachinidae.

== Distribution ==
Mexico.
