= Microchaetina arida =

Scientific classification
- Kingdom: Animalia
- Phylum: Arthropoda
- Class: Insecta
- Order: Diptera
- Family: Tachinidae
- Subfamily: Dexiinae
- Tribe: Dexiini
- Genus: Microchaetina
- Species: M. arida

Binomial name
- Microchaetina arida (Townsend, 1911)

Synonyms
- Almugmyia arida Townsend, 1911

Species of fly

Microchaetina arida is a species of fly in the family Tachinidae. The species is found in Peru.
