= Microchaetina petiolata =

Scientific classification
- Kingdom: Animalia
- Phylum: Arthropoda
- Class: Insecta
- Order: Diptera
- Family: Tachinidae
- Subfamily: Dexiinae
- Tribe: Dexiini
- Genus: Microchaetina
- Species: M. petiolata

Binomial name
- Microchaetina petiolata (Townsend, 1919)

Synonyms
- Hypenomyia petiolata Townsend, 1919

Species of fly

Microchaetina petiolata is a species of fly in the family Tachinidae.

== Distribution ==
Canada, United States, Mexico.
