= Rasiliverpa agrianomei =

Scientific classification
- Kingdom: Animalia
- Phylum: Arthropoda
- Class: Insecta
- Order: Diptera
- Family: Tachinidae
- Subfamily: Dexiinae
- Tribe: Dexiini
- Genus: Rasiliverpa
- Species: R. agrianomei

Binomial name
- Rasiliverpa agrianomei (Mesnil, 1969)

Synonyms
- Billaea agrianomei Mesnil, 1969

Species of fly

Rasiliverpa agrianomei is a species of fly in the family Tachinidae.

== Distribution ==
New Caledonia.
