= Sarcocalirrhoe zuercheri =

Scientific classification
- Kingdom: Animalia
- Phylum: Arthropoda
- Class: Insecta
- Order: Diptera
- Family: Tachinidae
- Subfamily: Dexiinae
- Tribe: Dexiini
- Genus: Sarcocalirrhoe
- Species: S. zuercheri

Binomial name
- Sarcocalirrhoe zuercheri Townsend, 1928

Species of fly

Sarcocalirrhoe zuercheri is a species of fly in the family Tachinidae.

== Distribution ==
Paraguay.
