= Pretoriamyia munroi =

Scientific classification
- Kingdom: Animalia
- Phylum: Arthropoda
- Class: Insecta
- Order: Diptera
- Family: Tachinidae
- Subfamily: Dexiinae
- Tribe: Dexiini
- Genus: Pretoriamyia
- Species: P. munroi

Binomial name
- Pretoriamyia munroi Curran, 1927

Species of fly

Pretoriamyia munroi is a species of fly in the family Tachinidae.

== Distribution ==
South Africa Congo, Kenya, Tanzania, Yemen.
