= Mochlosoma validum =

Scientific classification
- Kingdom: Animalia
- Phylum: Arthropoda
- Class: Insecta
- Order: Diptera
- Family: Tachinidae
- Subfamily: Dexiinae
- Tribe: Dexiini
- Genus: Mochlosoma
- Species: M. validum

Binomial name
- Mochlosoma validum Brauer & von Berganstamm, 1889

Synonyms
- Mochlosoma mentitum Reinhard, 1964

Species of fly

Mochlosoma validum is a species of fly in the family Tachinidae.

== Distribution ==
United States, Mexico.
