= Opsotheresia obesa =

Scientific classification
- Kingdom: Animalia
- Phylum: Arthropoda
- Class: Insecta
- Order: Diptera
- Family: Tachinidae
- Subfamily: Dexiinae
- Tribe: Dexiini
- Genus: Opsotheresia
- Species: O. obesa

Binomial name
- Opsotheresia obesa Townsend, 1919

Synonyms
- Myiocera compacta West, 1925; Myiocera protrudens West, 1924

Species of fly

Opsotheresia obesa is a species of fly in the family Tachinidae.

== Distribution ==
United States.
