= Dasyuromyia nervosa =

Scientific classification
- Kingdom: Animalia
- Phylum: Arthropoda
- Class: Insecta
- Order: Diptera
- Family: Tachinidae
- Subfamily: Dexiinae
- Tribe: Dexiini
- Genus: Dasyuromyia
- Species: D. nervosa

Binomial name
- Dasyuromyia nervosa (Walker, 1836)

Synonyms
- Tachina nervosa Walker, 1836

Species of fly

Dasyuromyia nervosa is a species of fly in the family Tachinidae.

== Distribution ==
Chile
