= Trixiceps magnipalpis =

Scientific classification
- Kingdom: Animalia
- Phylum: Arthropoda
- Class: Insecta
- Order: Diptera
- Family: Tachinidae
- Subfamily: Dexiinae
- Tribe: Dexiini
- Genus: Trixiceps
- Species: T. magnipalpis

Binomial name
- Trixiceps magnipalpis (Bezzi, 1922)

Synonyms
- Paraprosena magnipalpis Bezzi, 1922; Trixiceps aegyptiaca Villeneuve, 1936

Species of fly

Trixiceps magnipalpis is a species of fly in the family Tachinidae.

== Distribution ==
Spain, Libya, Egypt.
