= Trichodura anceps =

Scientific classification
- Kingdom: Animalia
- Phylum: Arthropoda
- Class: Insecta
- Order: Diptera
- Family: Tachinidae
- Subfamily: Dexiinae
- Tribe: Dexiini
- Genus: Trichodura
- Species: T. anceps

Binomial name
- Trichodura anceps (Fabricius, 1805)

Synonyms
- Musca anceps Fabricius, 1805; Trichoduropsis guianensis Townsend, 1919

Species of fly

Trichodura anceps is a species of fly in the family Tachinidae.

== Distribution ==
Brazil, Guyana, Suriname.
