= Nimioglossa planicosta =

Scientific classification
- Kingdom: Animalia
- Phylum: Arthropoda
- Clade: Pancrustacea
- Class: Insecta
- Order: Diptera
- Family: Tachinidae
- Subfamily: Dexiinae
- Tribe: Dexiini
- Genus: Nimioglossa
- Species: N. planicosta

Binomial name
- Nimioglossa planicosta Reinhard, 1945

Species of fly

Nimioglossa planicosta is a species of fly in the family Tachinidae.

== Distribution ==
Canada, United States.
