= Rhamphinina pica =

Scientific classification
- Kingdom: Animalia
- Phylum: Arthropoda
- Class: Insecta
- Order: Diptera
- Family: Tachinidae
- Subfamily: Dexiinae
- Tribe: Dexiini
- Genus: Rhamphinina
- Species: R. pica

Binomial name
- Rhamphinina pica (Fabricius, 1805)

Synonyms
- Musca pica Fabricius, 1805; Rhamphinina dubia Bigot, 1885

Species of fly

Rhamphinina pica is a species of fly in the family Tachinidae.

== Distribution ==
Mexico, South America.
