= Epigrimyia illinoensis =

Scientific classification
- Kingdom: Animalia
- Phylum: Arthropoda
- Class: Insecta
- Order: Diptera
- Family: Tachinidae
- Subfamily: Dexiinae
- Tribe: Epigrimyiini
- Genus: Epigrimyia
- Species: E. illinoensis

Binomial name
- Epigrimyia illinoensis Robertson, 1901

Species of fly

Epigrimyia illinoensis is a species of fly in the family Tachinidae.

== Distribution ==
Canada, United States
