= Tropidodexia lutzi =

Scientific classification
- Kingdom: Animalia
- Phylum: Arthropoda
- Class: Insecta
- Order: Diptera
- Family: Tachinidae
- Subfamily: Dexiinae
- Tribe: Dexiini
- Genus: Tropidodexia
- Species: T. lutzi

Binomial name
- Tropidodexia lutzi Townsend, 1915

Species of fly

Tropidodexia lutzi is a species of fly in the family Tachinidae.

== Distribution ==
Brazil.
