= Urodexiomima uramyoides =

Scientific classification
- Kingdom: Animalia
- Phylum: Arthropoda
- Class: Insecta
- Order: Diptera
- Family: Tachinidae
- Subfamily: Dexiinae
- Tribe: Dexiini
- Genus: Urodexiomima
- Species: U. uramyoides

Binomial name
- Urodexiomima uramyoides Townsend, 1927

Species of fly

Urodexiomima uramyoides is a species of fly in the family Tachinidae.

== Distribution ==
Philippines.
