= Platytainia maculata =

Scientific classification
- Kingdom: Animalia
- Phylum: Arthropoda
- Clade: Pancrustacea
- Class: Insecta
- Order: Diptera
- Family: Tachinidae
- Subfamily: Dexiinae
- Tribe: Dexiini
- Genus: Platytainia
- Species: P. maculata

Binomial name
- Platytainia maculata Macquart, 1851

Species of fly

Platytainia maculata is a species of fly in the family Tachinidae.

== Distribution ==
Australia.
