= Sitellitergus aemulus =

Scientific classification
- Kingdom: Animalia
- Phylum: Arthropoda
- Class: Insecta
- Order: Diptera
- Family: Tachinidae
- Subfamily: Dexiinae
- Tribe: Dexiini
- Genus: Sitellitergus
- Species: S. aemulus

Binomial name
- Sitellitergus aemulus Reinhard, 1964

Species of fly

Sitellitergus aemulus is a species of fly in the family Tachinidae.

== Distribution ==
Mexico.
