= Orthosimyia montana =

Scientific classification
- Kingdom: Animalia
- Phylum: Arthropoda
- Class: Insecta
- Order: Diptera
- Family: Tachinidae
- Subfamily: Dexiinae
- Tribe: Dexiini
- Genus: Orthosimyia
- Species: O. montana

Binomial name
- Orthosimyia montana (Reinhard, 1944)

Synonyms
- Orthosia montana Reinhard, 1944

Species of fly

Orthosimyia montana is a species of fly in the family Tachinidae.

== Distribution ==
California.
