= Zeliomima caudata =

Scientific classification
- Kingdom: Animalia
- Phylum: Arthropoda
- Class: Insecta
- Order: Diptera
- Family: Tachinidae
- Subfamily: Dexiinae
- Tribe: Dexiini
- Genus: Zeliomima
- Species: Z. caudata

Binomial name
- Zeliomima caudata Mesnil, 1976

Species of fly

Zeliomima caudata is a species of fly in the family Tachinidae.

== Distribution ==
Madagascar.
