= Camarona xanthogastra =

Scientific classification
- Kingdom: Animalia
- Phylum: Arthropoda
- Class: Insecta
- Order: Diptera
- Family: Tachinidae
- Subfamily: Dexiinae
- Tribe: Dexiini
- Genus: Camarona
- Species: C. xanthogastra

Binomial name
- Camarona xanthogastra Wulp, 1891

Species of fly

Camarona xanthogastra is a species of fly in the family Tachinidae.

== Distribution ==
Mexico.
