= Microchaetina sinuata =

Scientific classification
- Kingdom: Animalia
- Phylum: Arthropoda
- Class: Insecta
- Order: Diptera
- Family: Tachinidae
- Subfamily: Dexiinae
- Tribe: Dexiini
- Genus: Microchaetina
- Species: M. sinuata

Binomial name
- Microchaetina sinuata (Townsend, 1919)

Synonyms
- Steveniopsis sinuata Townsend, 1919

Species of fly

Microchaetina sinuata is a species of fly in the family Tachinidae.

== Distribution ==
Canada, United States.
