= Myiomima sarcophagina =

Scientific classification
- Kingdom: Animalia
- Phylum: Arthropoda
- Class: Insecta
- Order: Diptera
- Family: Tachinidae
- Subfamily: Dexiinae
- Tribe: Dexiini
- Genus: Myiomima
- Species: M. sarcophagina

Binomial name
- Myiomima sarcophagina Brauer & von Berganstamm, 1889

Species of fly

Myiomima sarcophagina is a species of fly in the family Tachinidae.

== Distribution ==
Brazil.
