= Meleterus montanus =

Scientific classification
- Kingdom: Animalia
- Phylum: Arthropoda
- Class: Insecta
- Order: Diptera
- Family: Tachinidae
- Subfamily: Dexiinae
- Tribe: Voriini
- Genus: Meleterus
- Species: M. montanus

Binomial name
- Meleterus montanus Aldrich, 1926

Species of fly

Meleterus montanus is a species of fly in the family Tachinidae.

== Distribution ==
Mexico, United States.
