= Sturmiodexia rubescens =

Scientific classification
- Kingdom: Animalia
- Phylum: Arthropoda
- Class: Insecta
- Order: Diptera
- Family: Tachinidae
- Subfamily: Dexiinae
- Tribe: Dexiini
- Genus: Sturmiodexia
- Species: S. rubescens

Binomial name
- Sturmiodexia rubescens Townsend, 1919

Species of fly

Sturmiodexia rubescens is a species of fly in the family Tachinidae.

== Distribution ==
Peru.
