= Opsotheresia bigelowi =

Scientific classification
- Kingdom: Animalia
- Phylum: Arthropoda
- Class: Insecta
- Order: Diptera
- Family: Tachinidae
- Subfamily: Dexiinae
- Tribe: Dexiini
- Genus: Opsotheresia
- Species: O. bigelowi

Binomial name
- Opsotheresia bigelowi (Curran, 1926)

Synonyms
- Gymnodexia bigelowi Curran, 1926; Opsotheresia nigricornis Reinhard, 1939

Species of fly

Opsotheresia bigelowi is a species of bristle fly in the family Tachinidae.

== Distribution ==
Canada, United States.
