= Microchaetina valida =

Scientific classification
- Kingdom: Animalia
- Phylum: Arthropoda
- Class: Insecta
- Order: Diptera
- Family: Tachinidae
- Subfamily: Dexiinae
- Tribe: Dexiini
- Genus: Microchaetina
- Species: M. valida

Binomial name
- Microchaetina valida (Townsend, 1892)

Synonyms
- Rhinophora valida Townsend, 1892

Species of fly

Microchaetina valida is a species of fly in the family Tachinidae.

== Distribution ==
United States, Mexico.
