= Mochlosoma mexicanum =

Scientific classification
- Kingdom: Animalia
- Phylum: Arthropoda
- Class: Insecta
- Order: Diptera
- Family: Tachinidae
- Subfamily: Dexiinae
- Tribe: Dexiini
- Genus: Mochlosoma
- Species: M. mexicanum

Binomial name
- Mochlosoma mexicanum (Macquart, 1851)

Synonyms
- Mochlosoma tesselans Wulp, 1891; Prosena mexicana Macquart, 1851

Species of fly

Mochlosoma mexicanum is a species of fly in the family Tachinidae.

== Distribution ==
Mexico.
