= Sarcocalirrhoe trivittata =

Scientific classification
- Kingdom: Animalia
- Phylum: Arthropoda
- Class: Insecta
- Order: Diptera
- Family: Tachinidae
- Subfamily: Dexiinae
- Tribe: Dexiini
- Genus: Sarcocalirrhoe
- Species: S. trivittata

Binomial name
- Sarcocalirrhoe trivittata (Curran, 1925)

Synonyms
- Myiomima trivittata Curran, 1925

Species of fly

Sarcocalirrhoe trivittata is a species of fly in the family Tachinidae.

== Distribution ==
Brazil.
