= Psecacera facialis =

Scientific classification
- Kingdom: Animalia
- Phylum: Arthropoda
- Class: Insecta
- Order: Diptera
- Family: Tachinidae
- Subfamily: Dexiinae
- Tribe: Dexiini
- Genus: Psecacera
- Species: P. facialis

Binomial name
- Psecacera facialis (Townsend, 1933)

Synonyms
- Trixodopsis facialis Townsend, 1933

Species of fly

Psecacera facialis is a species of fly in the family Tachinidae.

== Distribution ==
Chile.
