= Psecacera chiliensis =

Scientific classification
- Kingdom: Animalia
- Phylum: Arthropoda
- Clade: Pancrustacea
- Class: Insecta
- Order: Diptera
- Family: Tachinidae
- Subfamily: Dexiinae
- Tribe: Dexiini
- Genus: Psecacera
- Species: P. chiliensis

Binomial name
- Psecacera chiliensis Bigot, 1880

Species of fly

Psecacera chiliensis is a species of fly in the family Tachinidae.

== Distribution ==
Chile, New Zealand (introduced).
