= Microchaetina mexicana =

Scientific classification
- Kingdom: Animalia
- Phylum: Arthropoda
- Class: Insecta
- Order: Diptera
- Family: Tachinidae
- Subfamily: Dexiinae
- Tribe: Dexiini
- Genus: Microchaetina
- Species: M. mexicana

Binomial name
- Microchaetina mexicana (Townsend, 1892)

Synonyms
- Microchaetina setifacies Reinhard, 1942; Rhinophora mexicana Townsend, 1892

Species of fly

Microchaetina mexicana is a species of fly in the family Tachinidae.

== Distribution ==
United States.
