= Trixodes obesus =

Scientific classification
- Kingdom: Animalia
- Phylum: Arthropoda
- Class: Insecta
- Order: Diptera
- Family: Tachinidae
- Subfamily: Dexiinae
- Tribe: Dexiini
- Genus: Trixodes
- Species: T. obesus

Binomial name
- Trixodes obesus Coquillett, 1902

Species of fly

Trixodes obesus is a species of fly in the family Tachinidae.

== Distribution ==
United States, Mexico.
