= Trichostylum flavicorne =

Scientific classification
- Kingdom: Animalia
- Phylum: Arthropoda
- Clade: Pancrustacea
- Class: Insecta
- Order: Diptera
- Family: Tachinidae
- Subfamily: Dexiinae
- Tribe: Dexiini
- Genus: Trichostylum
- Species: T. flavicorne

Binomial name
- Trichostylum flavicorne (Malloch, 1930)

Synonyms
- Anatropomyia flavicornis Malloch, 1930

Species of fly

Trichostylum flavicorne is a species of fly in the family Tachinidae.

== Distribution ==
Australia.
