= Microchaetina cinerea =

Scientific classification
- Kingdom: Animalia
- Phylum: Arthropoda
- Class: Insecta
- Order: Diptera
- Family: Tachinidae
- Subfamily: Dexiinae
- Tribe: Dexiini
- Genus: Microchaetina
- Species: M. cinerea

Binomial name
- Microchaetina cinerea Wulp, 1891

Species of fly

Microchaetina cinerea is a species of fly in the family Tachinidae.

== Distribution ==
Mexico.
