= Zeuxiotrix cinerosa =

Scientific classification
- Kingdom: Animalia
- Phylum: Arthropoda
- Class: Insecta
- Order: Diptera
- Family: Tachinidae
- Subfamily: Dexiinae
- Tribe: Dexiini
- Genus: Zeuxiotrix
- Species: Z. cinerosa

Binomial name
- Zeuxiotrix cinerosa Mesnil, 1976

Species of fly

Zeuxiotrix cinerosa is a species of fly in the family Tachinidae.

== Distribution ==
Madagascar.
