= Dasyuromyia inornata =

Scientific classification
- Kingdom: Animalia
- Phylum: Arthropoda
- Class: Insecta
- Order: Diptera
- Family: Tachinidae
- Subfamily: Dexiinae
- Tribe: Dexiini
- Genus: Dasyuromyia
- Species: D. inornata

Binomial name
- Dasyuromyia inornata (Walker, 1836)

Synonyms
- Dasyuromyia penicillata Bigot, 1885; Mesembriophyto magellana Townsend, 1916; Tachina inornata Walker, 1836

Species of fly

Dasyuromyia inornata is a species of fly in the family Tachinidae.

== Distribution ==
Chile
