= Nimioglossa ravida =

Scientific classification
- Kingdom: Animalia
- Phylum: Arthropoda
- Class: Insecta
- Order: Diptera
- Family: Tachinidae
- Subfamily: Dexiinae
- Tribe: Dexiini
- Genus: Nimioglossa
- Species: N. ravida

Binomial name
- Nimioglossa ravida Reinhard, 1945

Species of fly

Nimioglossa ravida is a species of fly in the family Tachinidae.

== Distribution ==
Mexico, United States.
