= Hyosoma =

Scientific classification
- Kingdom: Animalia
- Phylum: Arthropoda
- Clade: Pancrustacea
- Class: Insecta
- Order: Diptera
- Family: Tachinidae
- Subfamily: Dexiinae
- Tribe: Dexiini
- Genus: Hyosoma; Aldrich, 1934

Type species
- Hyosoma limbisquama Aldrich, 1934

Genus of flies

Hyosoma is a genus of parasitic flies in the family Tachinidae.

== Species ==
- Hyosoma limbisquamum Aldrich, 1934

== Distribution ==
Argentina, Chile.
