= Aldrichiopa =

Scientific classification
- Kingdom: Animalia
- Phylum: Arthropoda
- Clade: Pancrustacea
- Class: Insecta
- Order: Diptera
- Family: Tachinidae
- Subfamily: Dexiinae
- Tribe: Voriini
- Genus: Aldrichiopa; Guimarães, 1971

Type species
- Aphelogaster coracella Aldrich, 1934

Synonyms
- Aphelogaster Aldrich, 1934

Genus of flies

Aldrichiopa is a genus of flies in the family Tachinidae.

== Species ==
- Aldrichiopa coracella (Aldrich, 1934)

== Distribution ==
Argentina, Chile.
