= Medinophyto =

Scientific classification
- Kingdom: Animalia
- Phylum: Arthropoda
- Class: Insecta
- Order: Diptera
- Family: Tachinidae
- Subfamily: Dexiinae
- Genus: Medinophyto; Townsend, 1927

Type species
- Medinophyto gracilis Townsend, 1927

Synonyms
- Callesthes (Aldrich, 1928)

Genus of flies

Medinophyto is a genus of bristle flies in the family Tachinidae.

== Species ==
- Medinophyto dilecta (Wiedemann, 1830)
- Medinophyto histrio (Aldrich, 1928)
