= Incamyia =

Scientific classification
- Kingdom: Animalia
- Phylum: Arthropoda
- Clade: Pancrustacea
- Class: Insecta
- Order: Diptera
- Family: Tachinidae
- Subfamily: Exoristinae
- Tribe: Blondeliini
- Genus: Incamyia; Townsend, 1912

Type species
- Incamyia cuzcensis Townsend, 1912

Synonyms
- Sphalloglandulus Townsend, 1915; Prophrynopsis Townsend, 1927

Genus of flies

Incamyia is a genus of parasitic flies in the family Tachinidae.

== Species ==
- Incamyia charlini Cortés, 1968
- Incamyia chilensis Aldrich, 1928
- Incamyia cincerea Cortés & Campos, 1971
- Incamyia cuzcensis Townsend, 1912
- Incamyia nuda Aldrich, 1934
- Incamyia perezi Cortés & Campos, 1971
- Incamyia peruviana (Townsend, 1927)
- Incamyia picta Cortés, 1976
- Incamyia sandovali Cortés & Campos, 1971
- Incamyia spinicosta Aldrich, 1928
- Incamyia striata Aldrich, 1928
- Incamyia unica (Townsend, 1915)
