= Callotroxis =

Scientific classification
- Kingdom: Animalia
- Phylum: Arthropoda
- Class: Insecta
- Order: Diptera
- Family: Tachinidae
- Subfamily: Dexiinae
- Tribe: Dexiini
- Genus: Callotroxis; Aldrich, 1929

Type species
- Callotroxis edwardsi Aldrich, 1929

Genus of flies

Callotroxis is a genus of flies in the family Tachinidae.

== Species ==
- Callotroxis edwardsi Aldrich, 1929

== Distribution ==
Chile.
