= Ursophyto =

Scientific classification
- Kingdom: Animalia
- Phylum: Arthropoda
- Class: Insecta
- Order: Diptera
- Family: Tachinidae
- Subfamily: Dexiinae
- Tribe: Dexiini
- Genus: Ursophyto; Aldrich, 1926

Type species
- Myostoma nigriceps Bigot, 1889

Genus of flies

Ursophyto is a genus of flies in the family Tachinidae.

== Species ==
- Ursophyto nigriceps (Bigot, 1889)

== Distribution ==
Canada, United States.
