= Notodytes =

Scientific classification
- Kingdom: Animalia
- Phylum: Arthropoda
- Class: Insecta
- Order: Diptera
- Family: Tachinidae
- Subfamily: Dexiinae
- Tribe: Dexiini
- Genus: Notodytes; Aldrich, 1934

Type species
- Notodytes variabilis Aldrich, 1934

Genus of flies

Notodytes is a genus of flies in the family Tachinidae.

== Species ==
- Notodytes aurea Aldrich, 1934
- Notodytes major Aldrich, 1934
- Notodytes variabilis Aldrich, 1934
