= Coracomyia =

Scientific classification
- Kingdom: Animalia
- Phylum: Arthropoda
- Class: Insecta
- Order: Diptera
- Family: Tachinidae
- Subfamily: Dexiinae
- Tribe: Voriini
- Genus: Coracomyia; Aldrich, 1934

Type species
- Coracomyia crassicornis Aldrich, 1934

Genus of flies

Coracomyia is a genus of flies in the family Tachinidae.

== Species ==
- Coracomyia crassicornis Aldrich, 1934
- Coracomyia woodi Cortés, 1976
