= Piriona =

Scientific classification
- Kingdom: Animalia
- Phylum: Arthropoda
- Clade: Pancrustacea
- Class: Insecta
- Order: Diptera
- Family: Tachinidae
- Subfamily: Dexiinae
- Tribe: Voriini
- Genus: Piriona; Aldrich, 1928

Type species
- Piriona fasciculata Aldrich, 1928

Genus of flies

Piriona is a genus of flies in the family Tachinidae.

== Species ==
- Piriona fasciculata Aldrich, 1928

== Distribution ==
Argentina, Chile.
