= Morphodexia =

Scientific classification
- Kingdom: Animalia
- Phylum: Arthropoda
- Class: Insecta
- Order: Diptera
- Family: Tachinidae
- Subfamily: Dexiinae
- Tribe: Dexiini
- Genus: Morphodexia; Townsend, 1931

Type species
- Camarona barrosi Brèthes, 1919

Genus of flies

Morphodexia is a genus of flies in the family Tachinidae.

== Species ==
- Morphodexia barrosi (Brèthes, 1919)
- Morphodexia clausa Aldrich, 1934
- Morphodexia facialis (Aldrich, 1928)
- Morphodexia nigra Aldrich, 1934
- Morphodexia palpalis Aldrich, 1934
- Morphodexia subaenea Aldrich, 1934
