= Chaetonodexodes =

Scientific classification
- Kingdom: Animalia
- Phylum: Arthropoda
- Class: Insecta
- Order: Diptera
- Family: Tachinidae
- Subfamily: Exoristinae
- Tribe: Blondeliini
- Genus: Chaetonodexodes; Townsend, 1916

Type species
- Chaetonodexodes rafaeli Townsend, 1916

Genus of flies

Chaetonodexodes is a genus of flies in the family Tachinidae.

== Species ==
- Chaetonodexodes marshalli Aldrich, 1931
- Chaetonodexodes rafaeli Townsend, 1916
- Chaetonodexodes vanderwulpi (Townsend, 1892)
