= Daetaleus =

Scientific classification
- Kingdom: Animalia
- Phylum: Arthropoda
- Class: Insecta
- Order: Diptera
- Family: Tachinidae
- Subfamily: Dexiinae
- Tribe: Dexiini
- Genus: Daetaleus; Aldrich, 1928

Type species
- Daetaleus purpureus Aldrich, 1928

Synonyms
- Zuanalia Curran, 1934

Genus of flies

Daetaleus is a genus of flies in the family Tachinidae.

== Species ==
- Daetaleus azurea (Curran, 1934)
- Daetaleus purpureus Aldrich, 1928
