= Ganopleuron =

Scientific classification
- Kingdom: Animalia
- Phylum: Arthropoda
- Clade: Pancrustacea
- Class: Insecta
- Order: Diptera
- Family: Tachinidae
- Subfamily: Dexiinae
- Tribe: Voriini
- Genus: Ganopleuron; Aldrich, 1934

Type species
- Ganopleuron divergens Aldrich, 1934

Genus of flies

Ganopleuron is a genus of flies in the family Tachinidae.

== Species ==
- Ganopleuron divergens Aldrich, 1934

== Distribution ==
Argentina, Chile.
