= Meleterus =

Scientific classification
- Kingdom: Animalia
- Phylum: Arthropoda
- Class: Insecta
- Order: Diptera
- Family: Tachinidae
- Subfamily: Dexiinae
- Tribe: Voriini
- Genus: Meleterus; Aldrich, 1926

Type species
- Meleterus montanus Aldrich, 1926

Genus of insects

Meleterus is a genus of flies in the family Tachinidae.

== Species ==
- Meleterus montanus Aldrich, 1926
- Meleterus nuperus Reinhard, 1956
