= Psecacera =

Scientific classification
- Kingdom: Animalia
- Phylum: Arthropoda
- Class: Insecta
- Order: Diptera
- Family: Tachinidae
- Subfamily: Dexiinae
- Tribe: Dexiini
- Genus: Psecacera; Bigot, 1880

Type species
- Psecacera chiliensis Bigot, 1880

Synonyms
- Trixodopsis Townsend, 1933

Genus of flies

Psecacera is a genus of flies in the family Tachinidae.

== Species ==
- Psecacera atriventris Aldrich, 1934
- Psecacera chiliensis Bigot, 1880
- Psecacera facialis (Townsend, 1933)
- Psecacera latiforceps Aldrich, 1934
- Psecacera robusta Aldrich, 1934
- Psecacera tibialis Aldrich, 1934
- Psecacera virens (Aldrich, 1928)
