= Incamyia spinicosta =

Scientific classification
- Kingdom: Animalia
- Phylum: Arthropoda
- Class: Insecta
- Order: Diptera
- Family: Tachinidae
- Subfamily: Exoristinae
- Tribe: Blondeliini
- Genus: Incamyia
- Species: I. spinicosta

Binomial name
- Incamyia spinicosta Aldrich, 1928

Species of fly

Incamyia spinicosta is a species of fly in the family Tachinidae.

== Distribution ==
Chile.
