= Alexogloblinia =

Scientific classification
- Kingdom: Animalia
- Phylum: Arthropoda
- Class: Insecta
- Order: Diptera
- Family: Tachinidae
- Subfamily: Dexiinae
- Tribe: Voriini
- Genus: Alexogloblinia; Cortés, 1945

Type species
- Metopomuscopteryx shannoni Aldrich, 1934

Genus of flies

Alexogloblinia is a genus of flies in the family Tachinidae.

== Species ==
- Alexogloblinia shannoni (Aldrich, 1934)

== Distribution ==
Argentina.
