= Dasyuromyia =

Scientific classification
- Kingdom: Animalia
- Phylum: Arthropoda
- Class: Insecta
- Order: Diptera
- Family: Tachinidae
- Subfamily: Dexiinae
- Tribe: Dexiini
- Genus: Dasyuromyia; Bigot, 1888

Type species
- Dasyuromyia penicillata Bigot, 1888

Synonyms
- Dasyuromyia Bigot, 1885; Mesembriophyto Townsend, 1916; Selenomyia Brauer & von Berganstamm, 1891

Genus of flies

Dasyuromyia is a genus of flies in the family Tachinidae.

== Species ==
- Dasyuromyia aperta Aldrich, 1934
- Dasyuromyia inornata (Walker, 1836)
- Dasyuromyia lloydi Blanchard, 1947
- Dasyuromyia nervosa (Walker, 1836)
- Dasyuromyia nigriceps Aldrich, 1934
- Dasyuromyia sarcophagidea (Bigot, 1888)
- Dasyuromyia sternalis Aldrich, 1934
- Dasyuromyia tarsalis Aldrich, 1934
