= Villanovia =

Scientific classification
- Kingdom: Animalia
- Phylum: Arthropoda
- Class: Insecta
- Order: Diptera
- Family: Tachinidae
- Subfamily: Dexiinae
- Tribe: Dexiini
- Genus: Villanovia; Strobl, 1910

Type species
- Phyto aperta Strobl, 1910

Synonyms
- Lundbeckia Ringdahl, 1942

Genus of flies

Villanovia is a genus of flies in the family Tachinidae.

== Species ==
- Villanovia vilicornis (Zetterstedt, 1849)

== Distribution ==
Sweden, Austria, Switzerland, Russia.
