= Microchaetogyne =

Scientific classification
- Kingdom: Animalia
- Phylum: Arthropoda
- Class: Insecta
- Order: Diptera
- Family: Tachinidae
- Subfamily: Dexiinae
- Tribe: Dexiini
- Genus: Microchaetogyne; Townsend, 1931

Type species
- Prosena melaena Wulp, 1891

Genus of flies

Microchaetogyne is a genus of flies in the family Tachinidae.

== Species ==
- Microchaetogyne melaena (Wulp, 1891)

== Distribution ==
Mexico.
