= Ateloglossa =

Scientific classification
- Kingdom: Animalia
- Phylum: Arthropoda
- Class: Insecta
- Order: Diptera
- Family: Tachinidae
- Subfamily: Dexiinae
- Tribe: Dexiini
- Genus: Ateloglossa; Coquillett, 1899

Type species
- Ateloglossa cinerea Coquillett, 1899

Synonyms
- Arctophyto Townsend, 1915; Carinosillus Reinhard, 1943; Oreophyto Townsend, 1916; Vibrissotheresia Reinhard, 1943

Genus of flies

Ateloglossa is a genus of flies in the family Tachinidae.

== Species ==
- Ateloglossa algens (Curran, 1926)
- Ateloglossa borealis (Coquillett, 1900)
- Ateloglossa cinerea Coquillett, 1899
- Ateloglossa erythrocera (Thomson, 1869)
- Ateloglossa gillettei (Townsend, 1892)
- Ateloglossa glabra West, 1925
- Ateloglossa isolata (West, 1924)
- Ateloglossa johnsoni (West, 1924)
- Ateloglossa marginalis (Curran, 1924)
- Ateloglossa novaeangliae (West, 1924)
- Ateloglossa ochreicornis (Townsend, 1916)
- Ateloglossa regina (West, 1924)
- Ateloglossa trivittata Curran, 1930
- Ateloglossa wickhami (Townsend, 1915)
