= Opsotheresia =

Scientific classification
- Kingdom: Animalia
- Phylum: Arthropoda
- Class: Insecta
- Order: Diptera
- Family: Tachinidae
- Subfamily: Dexiinae
- Tribe: Dexiini
- Genus: Opsotheresia; Townsend, 1919

Type species
- Opsotheresia obesa Townsend, 1919

Genus of flies

Opsotheresia is a genus of flies in the family Tachinidae.

== Species ==
- Opsotheresia bigelowi (Curran, 1926)
- Opsotheresia obesa Townsend, 1919
