= Trichostylum =

Scientific classification
- Kingdom: Animalia
- Phylum: Arthropoda
- Class: Insecta
- Order: Diptera
- Family: Tachinidae
- Subfamily: Dexiinae
- Tribe: Dexiini
- Genus: Trichostylum; Macquart, 1851

Type species
- Trichostylum rufipalpis Macquart, 1851

Synonyms
- Anatropomyia Malloch, 1930; Hobartia Malloch, 1930

Genus of flies

Trichostylum is a genus of flies in the family Tachinidae.

== Species ==
- Trichostylum curryi Barraclough, 1992
- Trichostylum flavicorne (Malloch, 1930)
- Trichostylum flavum Barraclough, 1992
- Trichostylum fuscolaterale Barraclough, 1992
- Trichostylum grandipalpe Barraclough, 1992
- Trichostylum longivittatum Barraclough, 1992
- Trichostylum parafaciale Barraclough, 1992
- Trichostylum parvungulatum Barraclough, 1992
- Trichostylum peculiare (Malloch, 1930)
- Trichostylum pilosoculatum Barraclough, 1992
- Trichostylum racematum Barraclough, 1992
- Trichostylum rufipalpe Macquart, 1851
- Trichostylum vittatum Barraclough, 1992
