= Platytainia =

Scientific classification
- Kingdom: Animalia
- Phylum: Arthropoda
- Clade: Pancrustacea
- Class: Insecta
- Order: Diptera
- Family: Tachinidae
- Subfamily: Dexiinae
- Tribe: Dexiini
- Genus: Platytainia; Macquart, 1851

Type species
- Platytainia maculata Macquart, 1851

Genus of flies

Platytainia is a genus of flies in the family Tachinidae.

== Species ==
- Platytainia maculata Macquart, 1851
- Platytainia moorei Barraclough, 1992

== Distribution ==
Australia.
