= Ophirodexia =

Scientific classification
- Kingdom: Animalia
- Phylum: Arthropoda
- Class: Insecta
- Order: Diptera
- Family: Tachinidae
- Subfamily: Dexiinae
- Tribe: Dexiini
- Genus: Ophirodexia; Townsend, 1911

Type species
- Ophirodexia pulchra Townsend, 1911

Synonyms
- Tromodesiopsis Townsend, 1927

Genus of flies

Ophirodexia is a genus of flies in the family Tachinidae.

== Species ==
- Ophirodexia atrifrons (Wiedemann, 1830)
- Ophirodexia pulchra Townsend, 1911
- Ophirodexia semirufa (van der Wulp, 1891)

== Distribution ==
Peru.
