= Melanesomyia =

Scientific classification
- Kingdom: Animalia
- Phylum: Arthropoda
- Class: Insecta
- Order: Diptera
- Family: Tachinidae
- Subfamily: Dexiinae
- Genus: Melanesomyia; Barraclough, 1998

Type species
- Dexia nivifera Walker, 1861

Synonyms
- Melanesomyia Barraclough, 1997

Genus of flies

Melanesomyia is a genus of bristle flies in the family Tachinidae.

== Species ==
- Melanesomyia kraussi Barraclough, 1997
- Melanesomyia nivifera Walker, 1861
- Melanesomyia wauensis Barraclough, 1997
