= Frontodexia =

Scientific classification
- Kingdom: Animalia
- Phylum: Arthropoda
- Class: Insecta
- Order: Diptera
- Family: Tachinidae
- Subfamily: Dexiinae
- Tribe: Dexiini
- Genus: Frontodexia; Mesnil, 1976

Type species
- Frontodexia lutea Mesnil, 1976

Genus of flies

Frontodexia is a genus of flies in the family Tachinidae.

== Species ==
- Frontodexia lutea Mesnil, 1976

== Distribution ==
Madagascar.
