= Carbonilla =

Scientific classification
- Kingdom: Animalia
- Phylum: Arthropoda
- Class: Insecta
- Order: Diptera
- Family: Tachinidae
- Subfamily: Dexiinae
- Tribe: Dexiini
- Genus: Carbonilla; Mesnil, 1974

Type species
- Carbonilla luteicosta Mesnil, 1974

Genus of flies

Carbonilla is a genus of flies in the family Tachinidae.

== Species ==
- Carbonilla luteicosta Mesnil, 1974

== Distribution ==
Mongolia.
