= Myioscotiptera =

Scientific classification
- Kingdom: Animalia
- Phylum: Arthropoda
- Class: Insecta
- Order: Diptera
- Family: Tachinidae
- Subfamily: Dexiinae
- Tribe: Dexiini
- Genus: Myioscotiptera; Giglio-Tos, 1893

Type species
- Myioscotiptera cincta Giglio-Tos, 1893

Genus of flies

Myioscotiptera is a genus of flies in the family Tachinidae.

== Species ==
- Myioscotiptera cincta Giglio-Tos, 1893

== Distribution ==
Mexico.
