= Urodexiomima =

Scientific classification
- Kingdom: Animalia
- Phylum: Arthropoda
- Class: Insecta
- Order: Diptera
- Family: Tachinidae
- Subfamily: Dexiinae
- Tribe: Dexiini
- Genus: Urodexiomima; Townsend, 1927

Type species
- Urodexiomima uramyoides Townsend, 1927

Genus of flies

Urodexiomima is a genus of flies in the family Tachinidae.

== Species ==
- Urodexiomima javanensis (Macquart, 1835)
- Urodexiomima uramyoides Townsend, 1927
