= Milada (fly) =

Scientific classification
- Kingdom: Animalia
- Phylum: Arthropoda
- Class: Insecta
- Order: Diptera
- Family: Tachinidae
- Subfamily: Dexiinae
- Tribe: Dexiini
- Genus: Milada; Richter, 1973

Type species
- Milada asiatica Richter, 1973

Genus of flies

Milada is a genus of flies in the family Tachinidae.

== Species ==
- Milada asiatica Richter, 1973

== Distribution ==
Kazakhstan, Mongolia, Russia.
