= Carmodymyia =

Scientific classification
- Kingdom: Animalia
- Phylum: Arthropoda
- Class: Insecta
- Order: Diptera
- Family: Tachinidae
- Subfamily: Dexiinae
- Genus: Carmodymyia; Thompson, 1968

Type species
- Carmodymyia ancylostomiae Thompson, 1968

Genus of flies

Carmodymyia is a genus of flies in the family Tachinidae.

== Species ==
- Carmodymyia ancylostomiae Thompson, 1968

== Distribution ==
Trinidad and Tobago.
