= Rhamphinina =

Scientific classification
- Kingdom: Animalia
- Phylum: Arthropoda
- Clade: Pancrustacea
- Class: Insecta
- Order: Diptera
- Family: Tachinidae
- Subfamily: Dexiinae
- Tribe: Dexiini
- Genus: Rhamphinina; Bigot, 1885

Type species
- Rhamphinina dubia Bigot, 1885

Synonyms
- Rhamphinina Bigot, 1885; Paramyocera Townsend, 1915

Genus of flies

Rhamphinina is a genus of flies in the family Tachinidae.

== Species ==
- Rhamphinina discalis (Townsend, 1915)
- Rhamphinina pica (Fabricius, 1805)
