= Trixiceps =

Scientific classification
- Kingdom: Animalia
- Phylum: Arthropoda
- Class: Insecta
- Order: Diptera
- Family: Tachinidae
- Subfamily: Dexiinae
- Tribe: Dexiini
- Genus: Trixiceps; Villeneuve, 1936

Type species
- Trixiceps aegyptiaca Villeneuve, 1936

Genus of flies

Trixiceps is a genus of parasitic flies in the family Tachinidae.

== Species ==
- Trixiceps magnipalpis (Bezzi, 1922)
- Trixiceps russea Mesnil, 1980
