= Chaetogyne =

Scientific classification
- Kingdom: Animalia
- Phylum: Arthropoda
- Class: Insecta
- Order: Diptera
- Family: Tachinidae
- Subfamily: Dexiinae
- Tribe: Dexiini
- Genus: Chaetogyne; Brauer & von Bergenstamm, 1889

Type species
- Stomoxys vexans Wiedemann, 1830

Genus of flies

Chaetogyne is a genus of bristle flies in the family Tachinidae.

== Distribution ==
Brazil

== Species ==
- Chaetogyne analis Curran, 1937
- Chaetogyne vexans (Wiedemann, 1830)
- Chaetogyne zoae Toma, 2001
