= Megaparia =

Scientific classification
- Kingdom: Animalia
- Phylum: Arthropoda
- Class: Insecta
- Order: Diptera
- Family: Tachinidae
- Subfamily: Dexiinae
- Tribe: Dexiini
- Genus: Megaparia; Wulp, 1891

Type species
- Megaparia venosa Wulp, 1891

Genus of flies

Megaparia is a genus of flies in the family Tachinidae.

== Species ==
- Megaparia venosa Wulp, 1891

== Distribution ==
Mexico.
