= Echinodexia =

Scientific classification
- Kingdom: Animalia
- Phylum: Arthropoda
- Class: Insecta
- Order: Diptera
- Family: Tachinidae
- Subfamily: Dexiinae
- Tribe: Dexiini
- Genus: Echinodexia; Brauer & von Berganstamm, 1893

Type species
- Hystrisiphona pseudohystricia Brauer & von Bergenstamm, 1889

Genus of flies

Echinodexia is a genus of flies in the family Tachinidae.

== Species ==
- Echinodexia cubensis Malloch, 1932
- Echinodexia pseudohystricia (Brauer & von Berganstamm, 1889)
