= Thelairaporia =

Scientific classification
- Kingdom: Animalia
- Phylum: Arthropoda
- Class: Insecta
- Order: Diptera
- Family: Tachinidae
- Subfamily: Dexiinae
- Tribe: Uramyini
- Genus: Thelairaporia; Guimarães, 1980

Type species
- Thelairaporia brasiliensis Guimarães, 1980

Genus of flies

Thelairaporia is a genus of flies in the family Tachinidae.

== Species ==
- Thelairaporia brasiliensis Guimarães, 1980
- Thelairaporia pollinosa Guimarães, 1980

== Distribution ==
Brazil
