= Myiomima =

Scientific classification
- Kingdom: Animalia
- Phylum: Arthropoda
- Class: Insecta
- Order: Diptera
- Family: Tachinidae
- Subfamily: Dexiinae
- Tribe: Dexiini
- Genus: Myiomima; Brauer & von Berganstamm, 1889

Type species
- Myiomima sarcophagina Brauer & von Berganstamm, 1889

Genus of flies

Myiomima is a genus of flies in the family Tachinidae.

== Species ==
- Myiomima appendiculata (Bigot, 1889)
- Myiomima sarcophagina Brauer & von Berganstamm, 1889
