= Myiodexia =

Scientific classification
- Kingdom: Animalia
- Phylum: Arthropoda
- Class: Insecta
- Order: Diptera
- Family: Tachinidae
- Subfamily: Dexiinae
- Tribe: Dexiini
- Genus: Myiodexia; Cortés & Campos, 1971

Type species
- Myiodexia deserticola Cortés & Campos, 1971

Genus of flies

Myiodexia is a genus of parasitic flies in the family Tachinidae.

== Species ==
Myiodexia deserticola Cortés & Campos, 1971

== Distribution ==
Chile.
