= Chaetotheresia =

Scientific classification
- Kingdom: Animalia
- Phylum: Arthropoda
- Class: Insecta
- Order: Diptera
- Family: Tachinidae
- Subfamily: Dexiinae
- Tribe: Dexiini
- Genus: Chaetotheresia; Townsend, 1931

Type species
- Musca crassa Wiedemann, 1830

Genus of flies

Chaetotheresia is a genus of flies in the family Tachinidae.

== Species ==
- Chaetotheresia crassa (Wiedemann, 1830)

== Distribution ==
Brazil.
