= Platydexia =

Scientific classification
- Kingdom: Animalia
- Phylum: Arthropoda
- Class: Insecta
- Order: Diptera
- Family: Tachinidae
- Subfamily: Dexiinae
- Tribe: Dexiini
- Genus: Platydexia; Emden, 1954

Type species
- Platydexia maynei Emden, 1954

Genus of flies

Platydexia is a genus of flies in the family Tachinidae.

== Species ==
- Platydexia maynei Emden, 1954

== Distribution ==
Democratic Republic of the Congo.
