= Piligena =

Scientific classification
- Kingdom: Animalia
- Phylum: Arthropoda
- Class: Insecta
- Order: Diptera
- Family: Tachinidae
- Subfamily: Dexiinae
- Tribe: Dexiini
- Genus: Piligena; Emden, 1947

Type species
- Piligena mackieae Emden, 1947

Genus of flies

Piligena is a genus of flies in the family Tachinidae.

== Species ==
- Piligena mackieae Emden, 1947

== Distribution ==
South Africa, Zimbabwe.
