= Tropidopsiomorpha =

Scientific classification
- Kingdom: Animalia
- Phylum: Arthropoda
- Class: Insecta
- Order: Diptera
- Family: Tachinidae
- Subfamily: Dexiinae
- Tribe: Dexiini
- Genus: Tropidopsiomorpha; Townsend, 1927

Type species
- Tropidopsiomorpha tropica Townsend, 1927

Genus of flies

Tropidopsiomorpha is a genus of flies in the family Tachinidae.

== Species ==
- Tropidopsiomorpha tropica Townsend, 1927

== Distribution ==
Costa Rica, Brazil.
