= Ushpayacua =

Scientific classification
- Kingdom: Animalia
- Phylum: Arthropoda
- Class: Insecta
- Order: Diptera
- Family: Tachinidae
- Subfamily: Dexiinae
- Tribe: Dexiini
- Genus: Ushpayacua; Townsend, 1928

Type species
- Ushpayacua ureophila Townsend, 1928

Genus of flies

Ushpayacua is a genus of flies in the family of Tachinidae.

== Species ==
- Ushpayacua ureophila Townsend, 1928

== Distribution ==
It is widely found in Peru.
