= Eudexia =

Scientific classification
- Kingdom: Animalia
- Phylum: Arthropoda
- Class: Insecta
- Order: Diptera
- Family: Tachinidae
- Subfamily: Dexiinae
- Tribe: Dexiini
- Genus: Eudexia; Brauer & von Berganstamm, 1889

Type species
- Eudexia goliath Brauer & von Berganstamm, 1889

Genus of flies

Eudexia is a genus of flies in the family Tachinidae.

== Species ==
- Eudexia dreisbachi Reinhard, 1956
- Eudexia formidabilis (Bigot, 1889)
- Eudexia obscura (Bigot, 1889)
