= Punamyocera =

Scientific classification
- Kingdom: Animalia
- Phylum: Arthropoda
- Clade: Pancrustacea
- Class: Insecta
- Order: Diptera
- Family: Tachinidae
- Subfamily: Dexiinae
- Tribe: Dexiini
- Genus: Punamyocera; Townsend, 1919

Type species
- Punamyocera oroyensis Townsend, 1919

Genus of flies

Punamyocera is a genus of flies in the family Tachinidae.

== Species ==
- Punamyocera oroyensis Townsend, 1919

== Distribution ==
Peru
