= Phalacrophyto =

Scientific classification
- Kingdom: Animalia
- Phylum: Arthropoda
- Clade: Pancrustacea
- Class: Insecta
- Order: Diptera
- Family: Tachinidae
- Subfamily: Dexiinae
- Tribe: Dexiini
- Genus: Phalacrophyto; Townsend, 1915

Type species
- Paraphyto sarcophagina Coquillett, 1902

Genus of flies

Phalacrophyto is a genus of flies in the family Tachinidae.

== Species ==
- Phalacrophyto sarcophagina (Coquillett, 1902)

== Distribution ==
United States.
