= Rasiliverpa =

Scientific classification
- Kingdom: Animalia
- Phylum: Arthropoda
- Class: Insecta
- Order: Diptera
- Family: Tachinidae
- Subfamily: Dexiinae
- Tribe: Dexiini
- Genus: Rasiliverpa; Barraclough, 1992

Type species
- Billaea agrianomei Mesnil, 1969

Genus of flies

Rasiliverpa is a genus of flies in the family Tachinidae.

== Species ==
- Rasiliverpa agrianomei (Mesnil, 1969)
- Rasiliverpa vicinella (Mesnil, 1969)
