= Zeuxiotrix =

Scientific classification
- Kingdom: Animalia
- Phylum: Arthropoda
- Class: Insecta
- Order: Diptera
- Family: Tachinidae
- Subfamily: Dexiinae
- Tribe: Dexiini
- Genus: Zeuxiotrix; Mesnil, 1976

Type species
- Zeuxiotrix atra Mesnil, 1976

Genus of flies

Zeuxiotrix is a genus of flies in the family Tachinidae.

== Species ==
- Zeuxiotrix atra Mesnil, 1976
- Zeuxiotrix cinerosa Mesnil, 1976

== Distribution ==
Madagascar.
