= Tyreomma =

Scientific classification
- Kingdom: Animalia
- Phylum: Arthropoda
- Class: Insecta
- Order: Diptera
- Family: Tachinidae
- Subfamily: Dexiinae
- Tribe: Dexiini
- Genus: Tyreomma; Brauer & von Berganstamm, 1891

Type species
- Pterinopterna muscinum Townsend, 1919

Synonyms
- Eutheresiops Townsend, 1917; Pterinopterna Townsend, 1919

Genus of flies

Tyreomma is a genus of flies in the family Tachinidae.

== Species ==
- Tyreomma ciliatum (Townsend, 1919)
- Tyreomma muscinum Wulp, 1896
