= Orthosimyia =

Scientific classification
- Kingdom: Animalia
- Phylum: Arthropoda
- Class: Insecta
- Order: Diptera
- Family: Tachinidae
- Subfamily: Dexiinae
- Tribe: Dexiini
- Genus: Orthosimyia; Reinhard, 1944

Type species
- Orthosia montana Reinhard, 1944

Synonyms
- Orthosia Reinhard, 1944

Genus of flies

Orthosimyia is a genus of flies in the family Tachinidae.

== Species ==
- Orthosimyia montana (Reinhard, 1944)
- Orthosimyia palaga (Reinhard, 1944)

== Distribution ==
United States.
