= Pododexia =

Scientific classification
- Kingdom: Animalia
- Phylum: Arthropoda
- Class: Insecta
- Order: Diptera
- Family: Tachinidae
- Subfamily: Dexiinae
- Tribe: Dexiini
- Genus: Pododexia; Brauer & von Berganstamm, 1889

Type species
- Pododexia arachna Brauer & von Bergenstamm, 1889

Genus of flies

Pododexia is a genus of flies in the family Tachinidae.

== Species ==
- Pododexia arachna Brauer & von Berganstamm, 1889
- Pododexia hirtipleura Mesnil, 1976
- Pododexia similis Mesnil, 1976

== Distribution ==
Madagascar.
