= Cantrellius =

Scientific classification
- Kingdom: Animalia
- Phylum: Arthropoda
- Clade: Pancrustacea
- Class: Insecta
- Order: Diptera
- Family: Tachinidae
- Subfamily: Dexiinae
- Tribe: Dexiini
- Genus: Cantrellius; Barraclough, 1992

Type species
- Cantrellius splendidus Barraclough, 1992

Genus of flies

Cantrellius is a genus of flies in the family Tachinidae.

== Species ==
- Cantrellius splendidus Barraclough, 1992

== Distribution ==
Australia.
