= Bathydexia =

Scientific classification
- Kingdom: Animalia
- Phylum: Arthropoda
- Class: Insecta
- Order: Diptera
- Family: Tachinidae
- Subfamily: Dexiinae
- Tribe: Dexiini
- Genus: Bathydexia; Wulp, 1891

Type species
- Bathydexia wulpii Townsend, 1931

Genus of flies

Bathydexia is a genus of bristle flies in the family Tachinidae.

== Species ==
- Bathydexia albolineata Wulp, 1891
- Bathydexia wulpii Townsend, 1931
