= Hystrichodexia =

Scientific classification
- Kingdom: Animalia
- Phylum: Arthropoda
- Class: Insecta
- Order: Diptera
- Family: Tachinidae
- Subfamily: Dexiinae
- Tribe: Dexiini
- Genus: Hystrichodexia; Röder, 1886

Type species
- Hystrichodexia armata Röder, 1886

Synonyms
- Hystricodexia Williston, 1908

Genus of flies

Hystrichodexia is a genus of flies in the family Tachinidae.

== Species ==
- Hystrichodexia anthracina (Bigot, 1889)
- Hystrichodexia armata Röder, 1886
- Hystrichodexia brevicornis (Macquart, 1851)
- Hystrichodexia echinata Wulp, 1891
- Hystrichodexia insolita (Walker, 1853)
- Hystrichodexia mellea Giglio-Tos, 1893
- Hystrichodexia pueyrredoni Brèthes, 1918
