= Cordillerodexia =

Scientific classification
- Kingdom: Animalia
- Phylum: Arthropoda
- Class: Insecta
- Order: Diptera
- Family: Tachinidae
- Subfamily: Dexiinae
- Tribe: Dexiini
- Genus: Cordillerodexia; Townsend, 1927

Type species
- Cordillerodexia orientalis Townsend, 1927

Genus of flies

Cordillerodexia is a genus of bristle flies in the family Tachinidae.

== Species ==
- Cordillerodexia colombiana Townsend, 1929
- Cordillerodexia orientalis Townsend, 1927
