= Tromodesiopsis =

Scientific classification
- Kingdom: Animalia
- Phylum: Arthropoda
- Class: Insecta
- Order: Diptera
- Family: Tachinidae
- Subfamily: Dexiinae
- Tribe: Dexiini
- Genus: Tromodesiopsis; Townsend, 1927

Type species
- Tromodesia haemorrhoidalis Bigot, 1889

Genus of flies

Tromodesiopsis is a genus of flies in the family Tachinidae.

== Species ==
- Tromodesiopsis atrifrons (Wiedemann, 1830)

== Distribution ==
Mexico.
