= Diaugia =

Scientific classification
- Kingdom: Animalia
- Phylum: Arthropoda
- Class: Insecta
- Order: Diptera
- Family: Tachinidae
- Subfamily: Dexiinae
- Tribe: Dexiini
- Genus: Diaugia; Perty, 1833

Type species
- Diaugia angusta Perty, 1833

Synonyms
- Diaugea Agassiz, 1846; Diaughia Guimarães, 1971

Genus of flies

Diaugia is a genus of flies in the family Tachinidae.

== Species ==
- Diaugia angusta Perty, 1833

== Distribution ==
Brazil.
