= Sarcoprosena =

Scientific classification
- Kingdom: Animalia
- Phylum: Arthropoda
- Class: Insecta
- Order: Diptera
- Family: Tachinidae
- Subfamily: Dexiinae
- Tribe: Dexiini
- Genus: Sarcoprosena; Townsend, 1927

Type species
- Sarcoprosena triangulifera Townsend, 1927

Genus of flies

Sarcoprosena is a genus of parasitic flies in the family Tachinidae.

== Species ==
- Sarcoprosena luteola Cortés & Campos, 1974
- Sarcoprosena rufiventris Townsend, 1929
- Sarcoprosena triangulifera Townsend, 1927
