= Sarcocalirrhoe =

Scientific classification
- Kingdom: Animalia
- Phylum: Arthropoda
- Class: Insecta
- Order: Diptera
- Family: Tachinidae
- Subfamily: Dexiinae
- Tribe: Dexiini
- Genus: Sarcocalirrhoe; Townsend, 1928

Type species
- Sarcocalirrhoe zuercheri Townsend, 1928

Genus of flies

Sarcocalirrhoe is a genus of flies in the family Tachinidae.

== Species ==
- Sarcocalirrhoe trivittata (Curran, 1925)
- Sarcocalirrhoe zuercheri Townsend, 1928
