= Prosenina =

Scientific classification
- Kingdom: Animalia
- Phylum: Arthropoda
- Clade: Pancrustacea
- Class: Insecta
- Order: Diptera
- Family: Tachinidae
- Subfamily: Dexiinae
- Tribe: Dexiini
- Genus: Prosenina; Malloch, 1930

Type species
- Prosenina nicholsoni Malloch, 1930

Genus of flies

Prosenina is a genus of flies in the family Tachinidae.

== Species ==
- Prosenina nicholsoni Malloch, 1930
- Prosenina sandemani Barraclough, 1992
