= Leptodexia =

Scientific classification
- Kingdom: Animalia
- Phylum: Arthropoda
- Class: Insecta
- Order: Diptera
- Family: Tachinidae
- Subfamily: Dexiinae
- Tribe: Dexiini
- Genus: Leptodexia; Townsend, 1919

Type species
- Leptodexia gracilis Townsend, 1919

Synonyms
- Shermanalia Curran, 1934

Genus of flies

Leptodexia is a genus of parasitic flies in the family Tachinidae.

== Species ==
- Leptodexia gracilis Townsend, 1919
- Leptodexia pretiosa (Curran, 1934)
