= Zeliomima =

Scientific classification
- Kingdom: Animalia
- Phylum: Arthropoda
- Class: Insecta
- Order: Diptera
- Family: Tachinidae
- Subfamily: Dexiinae
- Tribe: Dexiini
- Genus: Zeliomima; Mesnil, 1976

Type species
- Zeliomima caudata Mesnil, 1976

Genus of flies

Zeliomima is a genus of parasitic flies in the family Tachinidae.

== Species ==
- Zeliomima caudata Mesnil, 1976
- Zeliomima chaetosa Mensil, 1976

== Distribution ==
Madagascar.
