= Uramyini =

Scientific classification
- Kingdom: Animalia
- Phylum: Arthropoda
- Class: Insecta
- Order: Diptera
- Family: Tachinidae
- Subfamily: Dexiinae
- Tribe: Uramyini; Guimaraes, 1980

Tribe of flies

Uramyini is a tribe of flies in the family Tachinidae.

== Genera ==
- Itaplectops Townsend, 1927
- Matucania Townsend, 1919
- Thelairaporia Guimarães, 1980
- Trinitodexia Townsend, 1935
- Uramya Robineau-Desvoidy, 1830
