= Gigamyiopsis =

Scientific classification
- Kingdom: Animalia
- Phylum: Arthropoda
- Class: Insecta
- Order: Diptera
- Family: Tachinidae
- Subfamily: Dexiinae
- Tribe: Dexiini
- Genus: Gigamyiopsis; Reinhard, 1964

Type species
- Gigamyiopsis funebris Reinhard, 1964

Genus of flies

Gigamyiopsis is a genus of flies in the family Tachinidae.

== Species ==
- Gigamyiopsis funebris Reinhard, 1964

== Distribution ==
Mexico.
