= Mitannia (fly) =

Scientific classification
- Kingdom: Animalia
- Phylum: Arthropoda
- Class: Insecta
- Order: Diptera
- Family: Tachinidae
- Subfamily: Dexiinae
- Tribe: Dexiini
- Genus: Mitannia; Herting, 1987

Type species
- Mitannia insueta Herting, 1987

Genus of flies

Mitannia is a genus of flies in the family Tachinidae.

== Species ==
- Mitannia insueta Herting, 1987

== Distribution ==
Turkey.
