= Eupododexia =

Scientific classification
- Kingdom: Animalia
- Phylum: Arthropoda
- Class: Insecta
- Order: Diptera
- Family: Tachinidae
- Subfamily: Dexiinae
- Tribe: Dexiini
- Genus: Eupododexia; Villeneuve, 1915

Synonyms
- Homotrixodes Townsend, 1926

Genus of flies

Eupododexia is a genus of flies in the family Tachinidae.

== Species ==
- Eupododexia amoena Mesnil, 1976
- Eupododexia diaphana Villeneuve, 1915
- Eupododexia festiva Villeneuve, 1915
- Eupododexia gigantea Mesnil, 1976
- Eupododexia picta Mesnil, 1976
