= Pachymyia =

Scientific classification
- Kingdom: Animalia
- Phylum: Arthropoda
- Class: Insecta
- Order: Diptera
- Family: Tachinidae
- Subfamily: Dexiinae
- Tribe: Dexiini
- Genus: Pachymyia; Macquart, 1843

Type species
- Pachymyia macquartii Townsend, 1916

Synonyms
- Pachymia Walker, 1858

Genus of flies

Pachymyia is a genus of flies in the family Tachinidae.

== Species ==
- Pachymyia macquartii Townsend, 1916

== Distribution ==
Brazil.
