= Platyrrhinodexia =

Scientific classification
- Kingdom: Animalia
- Phylum: Arthropoda
- Class: Insecta
- Order: Diptera
- Family: Tachinidae
- Subfamily: Dexiinae
- Tribe: Dexiini
- Genus: Platyrrhinodexia; Townsend, 1927

Type species
- Platyrrhinodexia punctulata Townsend, 1927

Genus of flies

Platyrrhinodexia is a genus of parasitic flies in the family Tachinidae.

== Species ==
- Platyrrhinodexia moyobambensis Townsend, 1929
- Platyrrhinodexia punctulata Townsend, 1927
