= Litophasia =

Scientific classification
- Kingdom: Animalia
- Phylum: Arthropoda
- Class: Insecta
- Order: Diptera
- Family: Tachinidae
- Subfamily: Dexiinae
- Genus: Litophasia; Girschner, 1887

Type species
- Litophasia hyalipennis Fallén, 1815

Genus of flies

Litophasia is a genus of flies in the family Tachinidae.

== Species ==
- Litophasia hyalipennis (Fallén, 1815)
- Litophasia sulcifacies Dear, 1980
