= Paulipalpus =

Scientific classification
- Kingdom: Animalia
- Phylum: Arthropoda
- Clade: Pancrustacea
- Class: Insecta
- Order: Diptera
- Family: Tachinidae
- Subfamily: Dexiinae
- Tribe: Dexiini
- Genus: Paulipalpus; Barraclough, 1992

Type species
- Paulipalpus zentae Barraclough, 1992

Genus of flies

Paulipalpus is a genus of flies in the family Tachinidae.

== Species ==
- Paulipalpus flavipes Barraclough, 1992
- Paulipalpus zentae Barraclough, 1992

== Distribution ==
Australia.
