= Megapariopsis =

Scientific classification
- Kingdom: Animalia
- Phylum: Arthropoda
- Class: Insecta
- Order: Diptera
- Family: Tachinidae
- Subfamily: Dexiinae
- Tribe: Dexiini
- Genus: Megapariopsis; Townsend, 1915

Type species
- Megaparia opaca Coquillett, 1899

Genus of flies

Megapariopsis is a genus of flies in the family Tachinidae.

== Species ==
- Megapariopsis opaca (Coquillett, 1899)

== Distribution ==
United States.
