= Eumegaparia =

Scientific classification
- Kingdom: Animalia
- Phylum: Arthropoda
- Clade: Pancrustacea
- Class: Insecta
- Order: Diptera
- Family: Tachinidae
- Subfamily: Dexiinae
- Tribe: Dexiini
- Genus: Eumegaparia; Townsend, 1908

Type species
- Megaparia flaveola Coquillett, 1902

Synonyms
- Eumegaparea Curran, 1934

Genus of flies

Eumegaparia is a genus of flies in the family Tachinidae.

== Species ==
- Eumegaparia flaveola (Coquillett, 1902)

== Distribution ==
Canada, United States.
