= Prorhynchops =

Scientific classification
- Kingdom: Animalia
- Phylum: Arthropoda
- Class: Insecta
- Order: Diptera
- Family: Tachinidae
- Subfamily: Dexiinae
- Tribe: Dexiini
- Genus: Prorhynchops; Brauer & von Berganstamm, 1891

Type species
- Prorhynchops bilimeki Brauer & von Bergenstamm, 1891

Synonyms
- Prorynchops Guimarães, 1971

Genus of flies

Prorhynchops is a genus of flies in the family Tachinidae.

== Species ==
- Prorhynchops bilimeki Brauer & von Berganstamm, 1891
- Prorhynchops errans Curran, 1927
