= Tropidodexia =

Scientific classification
- Kingdom: Animalia
- Phylum: Arthropoda
- Class: Insecta
- Order: Diptera
- Family: Tachinidae
- Subfamily: Dexiinae
- Tribe: Dexiini
- Genus: Tropidodexia; Townsend, 1915

Type species
- Tropidodexia lutzi Townsend, 1915

Genus of flies

Tropidodexia is a genus of flies in the family Tachinidae.

== Species ==
- Tropidodexia coracina (Wulp, 1891)
- Tropidodexia lutzi Townsend, 1915
