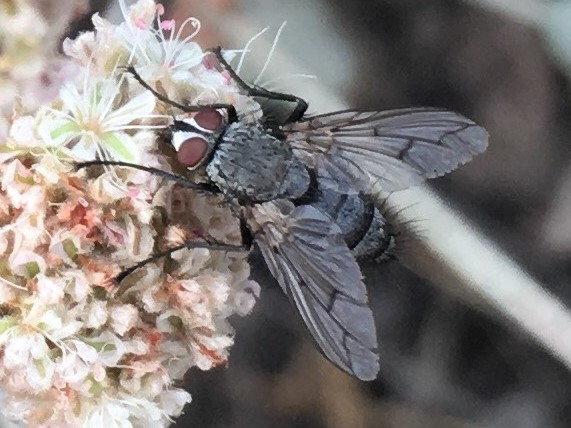

Scientific classification
- Kingdom: Animalia
- Phylum: Arthropoda
- Class: Insecta
- Order: Diptera
- Family: Tachinidae
- Subfamily: Dexiinae
- Tribe: Dexiini
- Genus: Microchaetina; Wulp, 1891

Type species
- Microchaetina cinerea Wulp, 1891

Synonyms
- Almugmyia Townsend, 1911; Hypenomyia Townsend, 1919; Reinhardiana Arnaud, 1952; Steveniopsis Townsend, 1919

= Microchaetina =

Genus of flies

Microchaetina is a genus of flies in the family Tachinidae.

== Species ==
- Microchaetina arida (Townsend, 1911)
- Microchaetina cinerea Wulp, 1891
- Microchaetina mexicana (Townsend, 1892)
- Microchaetina petiolata (Townsend, 1919)
- Microchaetina rubidiapex (Reinhard, 1942)
- Microchaetina sinuata (Townsend, 1919)
- Microchaetina subnitens (Reinhard, 1942)
- Microchaetina teleta Reinhard, 1962
- Microchaetina valida (Townsend, 1892)
