= Huascarodexia =

Scientific classification
- Kingdom: Animalia
- Phylum: Arthropoda
- Class: Insecta
- Order: Diptera
- Family: Tachinidae
- Subfamily: Dexiinae
- Tribe: Dexiini
- Genus: Huascarodexia; Townsend, 1919

Type species
- Huascarodexia pulchra Townsend, 1919

Genus of flies

Huascarodexia is a genus of flies in the family Tachinidae.

== Species ==
- Huascarodexia pulchra Townsend, 1919

== Distribution ==
Peru.
