= Hyadesimyia =

Scientific classification
- Kingdom: Animalia
- Phylum: Arthropoda
- Class: Insecta
- Order: Diptera
- Family: Tachinidae
- Subfamily: Dexiinae
- Tribe: Dexiini
- Genus: Hyadesimyia; Bigot, 1888

Type species
- Hyadesimyia clausa Bigot, 1888

Genus of flies

Hyadesimyia is a genus of flies in the family Tachinidae.

== Species ==
- Hyadesimyia clausa Bigot, 1888

== Distribution ==
Argentina, Chile
