= Dolichodinera =

Scientific classification
- Kingdom: Animalia
- Phylum: Arthropoda
- Class: Insecta
- Order: Diptera
- Family: Tachinidae
- Subfamily: Dexiinae
- Tribe: Dexiini
- Genus: Dolichodinera; Townsend, 1935

Type species
- Dolichodinera divaricata Townsend, 1935

Genus of flies

Dolichodinera is a genus of flies in the family Tachinidae.

== Species ==
- Dolichodinera divaricata Townsend, 1935

== Distribution ==
Guyana.
