= Neozelia =

Scientific classification
- Kingdom: Animalia
- Phylum: Arthropoda
- Class: Insecta
- Order: Diptera
- Family: Tachinidae
- Subfamily: Dexiinae
- Tribe: Dexiini
- Genus: Neozelia; Guimarães, 1975

Type species
- Neozelia alini Guimarães, 1975

Genus of flies

Neozelia is a genus of flies in the family Tachinidae.

== Species ==
- Neozelia alini Guimarães, 1975

== Distribution ==
Brazil.
