= Trixodes =

Scientific classification
- Kingdom: Animalia
- Phylum: Arthropoda
- Class: Insecta
- Order: Diptera
- Family: Tachinidae
- Subfamily: Dexiinae
- Tribe: Dexiini
- Genus: Trixodes; Coquillett, 1902

Type species
- Trixodes obesus Coquillett, 1902

Genus of flies

Trixodes is a genus of flies in the family Tachinidae.

== Species ==
- Trixodes obesus Coquillett, 1902

== Distribution ==
Mexico
