= Chaetodexia =

Scientific classification
- Kingdom: Animalia
- Phylum: Arthropoda
- Class: Insecta
- Order: Diptera
- Family: Tachinidae
- Subfamily: Dexiinae
- Tribe: Dexiini
- Genus: Chaetodexia; Mesnil, 1976

Type species
- Chaetodexia keiseri Mesnil, 1976

Genus of flies

Chaetodexia is a genus of bristle flies in the family Tachinidae.

== Distribution ==
Madagascar.

== Species ==
- Chaetodexia keiseri Mesnil, 1976
- Chaetodexia nigrescens Mesnil, 1976
- Chaetodexia pallida Mesnil, 1976
- Chaetodexia trilineata Mesnil, 1976
