= Nicephorus (fly) =

Scientific classification
- Kingdom: Animalia
- Phylum: Arthropoda
- Class: Insecta
- Order: Diptera
- Family: Tachinidae
- Subfamily: Dexiinae
- Tribe: Dexiini
- Genus: Nicephorus; Reinhard, 1944

Type species
- Nicephorus floridensis Reinhard, 1944

Synonyms
- Nicephotus Neave, 1950

Genus of flies

Nicephorus is a genus of flies in the family Tachinidae.

== Species ==
- Nicephorus floridensis Reinhard, 1944

== Distribution ==
United States.
