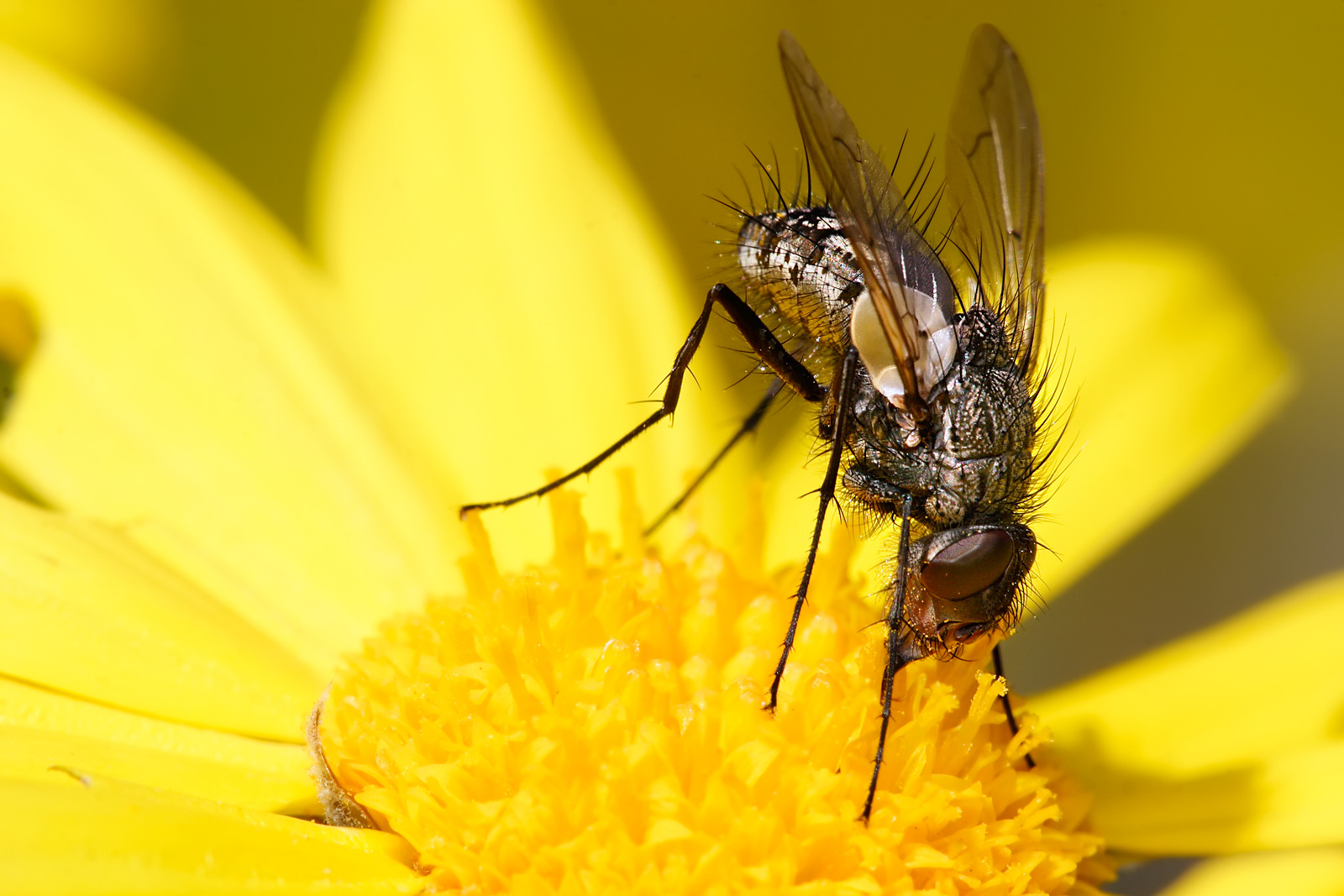

Scientific classification
- Kingdom: Animalia
- Phylum: Arthropoda
- Clade: Pancrustacea
- Class: Insecta
- Order: Diptera
- Family: Tachinidae
- Subfamily: Dexiinae
- Tribe: Dexiini
- Genus: Senostoma; Macquart, 1847

Type species
- Senostoma variegata Macquart, 1847

Synonyms
- Austrodexia Malloch, 1930; Lasiocalypter Malloch, 1930; Lasiocalyptrina Malloch, 1930; Macropodexia Townsend, 1933; Rhychiodexia Bigot, 1889; Rhychodexia Bigot, 1889; Rhycodexia Malloch, 1930; Rhynchiodexia Bigot, 1885; Rhynchionodexia Bigot, 1885; Rhynchodexia Wulp, 1891; Stenostoma Macquart, 1850

= Senostoma =

Genus of flies

Senostoma is a genus of parasitoid tachinid flies in the family Tachinidae. Endemic to Australasia, the flies are medium-sized, bristly, and long-legged.

== Taxonomy ==
French entomologist Pierre-Justin-Marie Macquart first described the genus in 1847 in the work "Diptères Exotiques, Nouveaux Ou Peu Connus, Supplément I", published in Memoires de la Societe royale des sciences, de l'agriculture et des arts, de Lille. Macquart stated that "Senostoma" signifies "narrow mouth".

At various times the name has been used generically, and misapplied to Prodiaphania and Microrutilia. Senostoma is classified in the subfamily Dexiinae; some older texts use the synonym Proseninae.

The genus comprises four species-groups, punctipenne, rubricarinaturn, longipes, and hirsutilunula.

There are approximately 10,000 species described within Tachinidae, and the geographic range and diversity of the species and difficulties encountered in classification means the count is probably thousands more. The monophyletic features that support Tachinidae classification are subtle, and detailed information on most genera and species is sparse. Senostoma is one such genus that lacks extensive research, with most studies having focussed only on a few of its 29 identified species.

== Distribution and habitat ==
As a member of the subfamily Dexiinae, Senostoma flies are endemic to the Australasian region. More specifically, the flies inhabit the Australian mainland and Tasmania, with two species present in New Caledonia and none in New Zealand. In Australia, members of the genus are non-existent in Cape York Peninsula and the Northern Territory. Some species are particularly narrow in distribution; S. basale inhabits only the Gondwana Rainforests, while S. hirticauda and S. simulcercus are limited to Barrington Tops and Tamborine Mountain, respectively.

Senostoma can be found in a variety of habitats in the Australian region, but most species appear to prefer dry eucalypt forest at elevations above 600 metres. Adults are attracted to flowers and feed on their nectar, contributing to pollination, with Leptospermum being favoured by some species. As well as resting on Eucalyptus tree trunks and the surrounding substrate at hill-topping sites, the flies are observable elsewhere feeding on flowers and resting on rocks and vegetation.

== Parasitism ==
As with all known Tachinidae, Senostoma are parasitoids. The larvae develop inside a host, as intercellular endoparasites, consuming and killing the host in the process. For Senostoma, these hosts are exclusively beetles, most usually Scarabaeidae in the larval stage. In some cases, the host may survive the attack.

The eggs are laid containing mature first instars, the female having incubated the eggs within her reproductive system until ready to hatch, a mode of reproduction known as ovolarviparity, more generally known as ovoviviparity. Deposition usually occurs on the ground and the eggs may hatch within seconds or a few minutes of being laid, whereupon the larvae hunt for a host beetle by burrowing into the soil. Other tachinids lay eggs directly onto potential hosts or food plants and therefore enjoy a higher success rate of infection; the number of eggs produced by Senostoma females is consequently higher than for some other genera, numbering somewhere between 1000 and 3000.

The labrum of the larval mouthparts is sharp and functions as a cutting device, with which they penetrate the integument of the selected host, possibly helped by enzymes in their saliva. Once established inside the hosts, the larvae feed on them, passing through second and third instars before pupation occurs. Larval development for tachinids may take between one and three weeks to complete, and the death of the host does not usually occur until the final stage, when the fly is ready to emerge for pupation. As such, Senostoma are considered koinobiont parasitoids, as they co-exist with a living, functional host during development and avoid feeding on vital organs or other critical tissues until it is necessary for their continued growth.

== Morphology ==
Adult members of the genus have bristly bodies and long, thin legs. Their size is generally in the range of 10 to 12 mm, making them medium-sized within the family, as measurements for tachinids span from 2 mm to 20 mm. Mouthparts are distinctively elongated and narrow. Limited information suggests that Senostoma colourings are usually at the nondescript end of tachinid fly variation, with at least a few species being light grey and brown.

Along with other genera, Senostoma flies possess two morphological features that support their inclusion in the family Tachinidiae. As larvae in the first instar, the labrum is attached to the cephalopharyngeal sclerites (the skeleton of the larval anterior digestive system), and as adults, the postscutellum is well-developed.

== Behaviour ==
A few species, S. longipes, S. pallidihirturn, and S. tessellaturn, have been noted to exhibit behaviour strongly suggestive of hill-topping, with males maintaining downward-facing positions on trunks of Eucalyptus trees, at elevations above 900 metres. This behaviour is likely to be applicable to other species within the genus. Each species studied appeared to prefer certain times of day for hill-topping and selected their positions on tree trunks based on bark smoothness or roughness, degree of illumination by sunlight, and distance from the ground. Males are competitive for these positions and can be observed engaging with each other aggressively, approaching each other for face-offs, spiral flights, and simulated copulation. While males congregating at altitude were in abundance, females were infrequently spotted at hill-topping sites, and when present, did not exhibit any territorial behaviour and preferred locations near the substrate. Female absence may be due to females only visiting the congregation sites when ready to mate. Although the behaviour of males and females at elevation are considered to be for mating purposes, direct evidence of this is lacking and little is known of their courtship and mating rituals.

== Species ==
- Senostoma apicalis (Curran, 1938)
- Senostoma appendiculatum (Macquart, 1851)
- Senostoma atripes (Malloch, 1930)
- Senostoma basale (Curran, 1938)
- Senostoma brevipalpe (Macquart, 1846)
- Senostoma flavipes Barraclough, 1991
- Senostoma flavohirtum (Malloch, 1930)
- Senostoma hirsutilunula Barraclough, 1992
- Senostoma hirticauda (Malloch, 1930)
- Senostoma hyria (Walker, 1849)
- Senostoma longimentum Barraclough, 1992
- Senostoma longipes (Macquart, 1846)
- Senostoma mcalpinei Barraclough, 1992
- Senostoma nigropilosum Barraclough, 1992
- Senostoma nigrospiraculum Barraclough, 1992
- Senostoma notatum (Walker, 1853)
- Senostoma pallidihirtum (Malloch, 1930)
- Senostoma pectinatum Barraclough, 1992
- Senostoma punctipenne (Macquart, 1846)
- Senostoma rubricarinatum (Macquart, 1846)
- Senostoma setigerum (Malloch, 1930)
- Senostoma setiventre (Malloch, 1930)
- Senostoma simulcercus Barraclough, 1992
- Senostoma taylori (Curran, 1938)
- Senostoma tenuipes (Bigot, 1885)
- Senostoma tessellatum (Macquart, 1851)
- Senostoma testaceicorne (Macquart, 1851)
- Senostoma unipunctum (Malloch, 1930)
- Senostoma variegata Macquart, 1847
