= Incamyia cuzcensis =

Scientific classification
- Kingdom: Animalia
- Phylum: Arthropoda
- Class: Insecta
- Order: Diptera
- Family: Tachinidae
- Subfamily: Exoristinae
- Tribe: Blondeliini
- Genus: Incamyia
- Species: I. cuzcensis

Binomial name
- Incamyia cuzcensis Townsend, 1912

Species of fly

Incamyia cuzcensis is a species of fly in the family Tachinidae.

== Distribution ==
Peru.
