= Prophorostoma =

Scientific classification
- Kingdom: Animalia
- Phylum: Arthropoda
- Class: Insecta
- Order: Diptera
- Family: Tachinidae
- Subfamily: Dexiinae
- Tribe: Dexiini
- Genus: Prophorostoma; Townsend, 1927

Type species
- Prophorostoma pulchrum Townsend, 1927

Genus of flies

Prophorostoma is a genus of flies in the family Tachinidae.

== Species ==
- Prophorostoma pulchrum Townsend, 1927
- Prophorostoma tomjobimi Nihei, 2006

== Distribution ==
Brazil.
