= Dolichocodia =

Scientific classification
- Kingdom: Animalia
- Phylum: Arthropoda
- Class: Insecta
- Order: Diptera
- Family: Tachinidae
- Subfamily: Dexiinae
- Tribe: Dexiini
- Genus: Dolichocodia; Townsend, 1908

Type species
- Myocera bivittata Coquillett, 1902

Genus of flies

Dolichocodia is a genus of flies in the family Tachinidae.

== Species ==
- Dolichocodia bivittata (Coquillett, 1902)
- Dolichocodia errans (Curran, 1927)
- Dolichocodia erratilis Reinhard, 1958
- Dolichocodia furacis Reinhard, 1958
- Dolichocodia praeusta (Wulp, 1891)
