= Piligenoides =

Scientific classification
- Kingdom: Animalia
- Phylum: Arthropoda
- Class: Insecta
- Order: Diptera
- Family: Tachinidae
- Subfamily: Dexiinae
- Tribe: Dexiini
- Genus: Piligenoides; Barraclough, 1985

Type species
- Piligenoides vittata Barraclough, 1985

Genus of flies

Piligenoides is a genus of flies in the family Tachinidae.

== Species ==
- Piligenoides vittata Barraclough, 1985

== Distribution ==
South Africa.
