= Chaetocalirrhoe =

Scientific classification
- Domain: Eukaryota
- Kingdom: Animalia
- Phylum: Arthropoda
- Class: Insecta
- Order: Diptera
- Family: Tachinidae
- Subfamily: Dexiinae
- Tribe: Dexiini
- Genus: Chaetocalirrhoe; Townsend, 1935

Type species
- Chaetocalirrhoe grandis Townsend, 1935

Synonyms
- Chaetocallirrhoe Guimarães 1971

Genus of flies

Chaetocalirrhoe is a genus of bristle flies in the family Tachinidae.

== Species ==
- Chaetocalirrhoe grandis Townsend, 1935

== Distribution ==
Greater Antilles, Haiti.
