= Itaplectops =

Scientific classification
- Kingdom: Animalia
- Phylum: Arthropoda
- Class: Insecta
- Order: Diptera
- Family: Tachinidae
- Subfamily: Dexiinae
- Tribe: Uramyini
- Genus: Itaplectops; Townsend, 1927

Type species
- Itaplectops antennalis Townsend, 1927

Synonyms
- Itaplectopsis Guimarães, 1971

Genus of flies

Itaplectops is a genus of flies in the family Tachinidae.

== Species ==
- Itaplectops anikenpalolae Fleming & Wood, 2015
- Itaplectops antennalis Townsend, 1927
- Itaplectops argentifrons Fleming & Wood, 2015
- Itaplectops askelpalolai Fleming & Wood, 2015
- Itaplectops aurifrons Fleming & Wood, 2015
- Itaplectops ericpalolai Fleming & Wood, 2015
- Itaplectops griseobasis Fleming & Wood, 2015
- Itaplectops omissus Fleming & Wood, 2015
- Itaplectops shellymcsweeneyae Fleming & Wood, 2015
- Itaplectops tristanpalolai Fleming & Wood, 2015
