= Euthyprosopiella =

Scientific classification
- Kingdom: Animalia
- Phylum: Arthropoda
- Class: Insecta
- Order: Diptera
- Family: Tachinidae
- Subfamily: Dexiinae
- Genus: Euthyprosopiella; Blanchard, 1963

Type species
- Euthyprosopiella pallidula Blanchard, 1963

Genus of flies

Euthyprosopiella is a genus of flies in the family Tachinidae.

== Species ==
- Euthyprosopiella mendocina Blanchard, 1963

== Distribution ==
Argentina.
