= Aglummyia =

Scientific classification
- Kingdom: Animalia
- Phylum: Arthropoda
- Class: Insecta
- Order: Diptera
- Family: Tachinidae
- Subfamily: Dexiinae
- Tribe: Dexiini
- Genus: Aglummyia; Townsend, 1912

Type species
- Aglummyia percinerea Townsend, 1912

Subspecies
- A. p. flavida Townsend, 1915; A. p. percinerea Townsend, 1912

Synonyms
- Aglumya Vimmer & Soukup, 1940; Aglumyia Vimmer & Soukup, 1940

Genus of flies

Aglummyia is a genus of flies in the family Tachinidae.

== Species ==
- Aglummyia percinerea Townsend, 1912

== Distribution ==
Peru.
