= Epigrimyia =

Scientific classification
- Kingdom: Animalia
- Phylum: Arthropoda
- Class: Insecta
- Order: Diptera
- Family: Tachinidae
- Subfamily: Dexiinae
- Tribe: Epigrimyiini
- Genus: Epigrimyia; Townsend, 1891

Type species
- Epigrimyia polita Townsend, 1891

Synonyms
- Epigrymyia Blanchard, 1940

Genus of flies

Epigrimyia is a genus of flies in the family Tachinidae.

== Species ==
- Epigrimyia illinoensis Robertson, 1901
- Epigrimyia polita Townsend, 1891
