= Pseudodexilla =

Scientific classification
- Kingdom: Animalia
- Phylum: Arthropoda
- Class: Insecta
- Order: Diptera
- Family: Tachinidae
- Subfamily: Dexiinae
- Tribe: Dexiini
- Genus: Pseudodexilla; O'Hara, Shima & Zhang, 2009

Type species
- Pseudodexia gui Chao, 2002

Synonyms
- Pseudodexia Chao, 2002

Genus of flies

Pseudodexilla is a genus of flies in the family Tachinidae.

== Species ==
- Pseudodexilla gui (Chao, 2002)

== Distribution ==
China.
