= Trinitodexia =

Scientific classification
- Kingdom: Animalia
- Phylum: Arthropoda
- Class: Insecta
- Order: Diptera
- Family: Tachinidae
- Subfamily: Dexiinae
- Tribe: Uramyini
- Genus: Trinitodexia; Townsend, 1935

Type species
- Trinitodexia mellisquama Townsend, 1935

Genus of flies

Trinitodexia is a genus of flies in the family Tachinidae.

== Species ==
- Trinitodexia trichops Townsend, 1935

== Distribution ==
Trinidad and Tobago.
