= Yahuarmayoia =

Scientific classification
- Kingdom: Animalia
- Phylum: Arthropoda
- Class: Insecta
- Order: Diptera
- Family: Tachinidae
- Subfamily: Dexiinae
- Tribe: Dexiini
- Genus: Yahuarmayoia; Townsend, 1927

Type species
- Yahuarmayoia analis Townsend, 1927

Genus of flies

Yahuarmayoia is a genus of flies in the family Tachinidae.

== Species ==
- Yahuarmayoia phaeoptera (Wiedemann, 1830)

== Distribution ==
Brazil, Peru.
