= Philippodexia =

Scientific classification
- Kingdom: Animalia
- Phylum: Arthropoda
- Class: Insecta
- Order: Diptera
- Family: Tachinidae
- Subfamily: Dexiinae
- Tribe: Dexiini
- Genus: Philippodexia; Townsend, 1926

Type species
- Philippodexia longipes Townsend, 1926

Synonyms
- Malayodinera Townsend, 1926; Kurintjimyia Townsend, 1926

Genus of flies

Philippodexia is a genus of flies in the family Tachinidae.

== Species ==
- Philippodexia longipes Townsend, 1926
- Philippodexia montana (Townsend, 1926)
- Philippodexia pallidula Mesnil, 1953
- Philippodexia sumatrensis Townsend, 1926
