= Nimioglossa =

Scientific classification
- Kingdom: Animalia
- Phylum: Arthropoda
- Class: Insecta
- Order: Diptera
- Family: Tachinidae
- Subfamily: Dexiinae
- Tribe: Dexiini
- Genus: Nimioglossa; Reinhard, 1945

Type species
- Nimioglossa ravida Reinhard, 1945

Genus of flies

Nimioglossa is a genus of flies in the family Tachinidae.

== Species ==
- Nimioglossa planicosta Reinhard, 1945
- Nimioglossa ravida Reinhard, 1945
