= Mochlosoma =

Scientific classification
- Kingdom: Animalia
- Phylum: Arthropoda
- Class: Insecta
- Order: Diptera
- Family: Tachinidae
- Subfamily: Dexiinae
- Tribe: Dexiini
- Genus: Mochlosoma; Brauer & von Bergenstamm, 1889

Type species
- Mochlosoma validum Brauer & von Bergenstamm, 1889

Synonyms
- Trochilodexia Townsend, 1915

Genus of flies

Mochlosoma is a genus of flies in the family Tachinidae.

== Species ==
- Mochlosoma adustum Reinhard, 1958
- Mochlosoma anale Giglio-Tos, 1893
- Mochlosoma demissum Reinhard, 1958
- Mochlosoma duplare Reinhard, 1958
- Mochlosoma furtum Reinhard, 1958
- Mochlosoma illocale Reinhard, 1958
- Mochlosoma indutile Reinhard, 1958
- Mochlosoma lacertosum (Wulp, 1891)
- Mochlosoma laudatum Reinhard, 1958
- Mochlosoma mexicanum (Macquart, 1851)
- Mochlosoma opipare Reinhard, 1958
- Mochlosoma rufipes Coquillett, 1902
- Mochlosoma russulum Reinhard, 1958
- Mochlosoma sabroskyi Reinhard, 1958
- Mochlosoma sarcinale Reinhard, 1958
- Mochlosoma sericeum Giglio-Tos, 1893
- Mochlosoma serotinum Reinhard, 1958
- Mochlosoma validum Brauer & von Bergenstamm, 1889
