= Gemursa =

Scientific classification
- Kingdom: Animalia
- Phylum: Arthropoda
- Class: Insecta
- Order: Diptera
- Family: Tachinidae
- Subfamily: Dexiinae
- Tribe: Dexiini
- Genus: Gemursa; Barraclough, 1992

Type species
- Gemursa fuscipes Barraclough, 1992

Genus of flies

Gemursa is a genus of parasitic flies in the family Tachinidae.

== Species ==
- Gemursa fuscipes Barraclough, 1992
- Gemursa trimaculata Barraclough, 1992
