= Megapariopsis opaca =

Scientific classification
- Domain: Eukaryota
- Kingdom: Animalia
- Phylum: Arthropoda
- Class: Insecta
- Order: Diptera
- Family: Tachinidae
- Genus: Megapariopsis
- Species: M. opaca

Binomial name
- Megapariopsis opaca Coquillet, 1899

Species of fly

Megapariopsis opaca is a species of flies in the genus Megapariopsis. The species is located in Florida. It was discovered by Daniel William Coquillett.

== Biology ==
The length of the species is 8.5 mm.
