= Pretoriamyia =

Scientific classification
- Kingdom: Animalia
- Phylum: Arthropoda
- Class: Insecta
- Order: Diptera
- Family: Tachinidae
- Subfamily: Dexiinae
- Tribe: Dexiini
- Genus: Pretoriamyia; Curran, 1927

Type species
- Pretoriamyia munroi Curran, 1927

Genus of flies

Pretoriamyia is a genus of flies in the family Tachinidae.

== Species ==
- Pretoriamyia anacrostichalis Emden, 1947
- Pretoriamyia munroi Curran, 1927
- Pretoriamyia ogilviei Emden, 1947
- Pretoriamyia plumicornis Emden, 1947
- Pretoriamyia sellifera Emden, 1947
- Pretoriamyia somereni Emden, 1947
