= Jurinodexia =

Scientific classification
- Kingdom: Animalia
- Phylum: Arthropoda
- Class: Insecta
- Order: Diptera
- Family: Tachinidae
- Subfamily: Dexiinae
- Tribe: Dexiini
- Genus: Jurinodexia; Townsend, 1915

Type species
- Hystrisiphona bicolor Giglio-Tos, 1893)

Genus of flies

Jurinodexia is a genus of flies in the family Tachinidae.

== Species ==
- Jurinodexia bicolor (Giglio-Tos, 1893)

== Distribution ==
Mexico.
