= Effusimentum =

Scientific classification
- Kingdom: Animalia
- Phylum: Arthropoda
- Clade: Pancrustacea
- Class: Insecta
- Order: Diptera
- Family: Tachinidae
- Subfamily: Dexiinae
- Tribe: Dexiini
- Genus: Effusimentum; Barraclough, 1992

Type species
- Effusimentum triangulum Barraclough, 1992

Genus of flies

Effusimentum is a genus of parasitic flies in the family Tachinidae.

== Species ==
- Effusimentum petiolatum Barraclough, 1992
- Effusimentum triangulum Barraclough, 1992
