= Sturmiodexia =

Scientific classification
- Kingdom: Animalia
- Phylum: Arthropoda
- Class: Insecta
- Order: Diptera
- Family: Tachinidae
- Subfamily: Dexiinae
- Tribe: Dexiini
- Genus: Sturmiodexia; Townsend, 1919

Type species
- Sturmiodexia rubescens Townsend, 1919

Synonyms
- Platyrrhinodexia Townsend, 1927

Genus of flies

Sturmiodexia is a genus of flies in the family Tachinidae.

== Species ==
- Sturmiodexia muscaria (Walker, 1853)
- Sturmiodexia rubescens Townsend, 1919
