= Euchaetogyne =

Scientific classification
- Kingdom: Animalia
- Phylum: Arthropoda
- Class: Insecta
- Order: Diptera
- Family: Tachinidae
- Subfamily: Dexiinae
- Tribe: Dexiini
- Genus: Euchaetogyne; Townsend, 1908

Type species
- Hystrichodexia roederi Williston, 1893

Genus of flies

Euchaetogyne is a genus of flies in the family Tachinidae.

== Species ==
- Euchaetogyne roederi (Williston, 1893)

== Distribution ==
United States, Mexico.
