= Orestilla =

Scientific classification
- Kingdom: Animalia
- Phylum: Arthropoda
- Class: Insecta
- Order: Diptera
- Family: Tachinidae
- Subfamily: Dexiinae
- Tribe: Dexiini
- Genus: Orestilla; Reinhard, 1944

Type species
- Orestilla primoris Reinhard, 1944

Genus of flies

Orestilla is a genus of flies in the family Tachinidae.

== Species ==
- Orestilla primoris Reinhard, 1944

== Distribution ==
United States.
