= Phasiops =

Scientific classification
- Kingdom: Animalia
- Phylum: Arthropoda
- Class: Insecta
- Order: Diptera
- Family: Tachinidae
- Subfamily: Dexiinae
- Tribe: Dexiini
- Genus: Phasiops; Coquillett, 1899

Type species
- Phasiops flavus Coquillett, 1899

Genus of flies

Phasiops is a genus of flies in the family Tachinidae.

== Species ==
- Phasiops flavus Coquillett, 1899

== Distribution ==
United States.
