= Mesnilotrix =

Scientific classification
- Kingdom: Animalia
- Phylum: Arthropoda
- Class: Insecta
- Order: Diptera
- Family: Tachinidae
- Subfamily: Dexiinae
- Tribe: Dexiini
- Genus: Mesnilotrix; O'Hara & Cerretti, 2016

Type species
- Dexiotrix empiformis Mesnil, 1976

Genus of flies

Mesnilotrix is a genus of flies in the family Tachinidae.

== Species ==
- Mesnilotrix empiformis (Mesnil, 1976)

== Distribution ==
Madagascar
