= Tylodexia =

Scientific classification
- Kingdom: Animalia
- Phylum: Arthropoda
- Class: Insecta
- Order: Diptera
- Family: Tachinidae
- Subfamily: Dexiinae
- Tribe: Dexiini
- Genus: Tylodexia; Townsend, 1926

Type species
- Tylodexia tenuis Townsend, 1926

Genus of flies

Tylodexia is a genus of flies in the family Tachinidae.

== Species ==
- Tylodexia precedens (Walker, 1859)

== Distribution ==
Java, Sulawesi, Sumatra.
