= Beskia =

Scientific classification
- Kingdom: Animalia
- Phylum: Arthropoda
- Clade: Pancrustacea
- Class: Insecta
- Order: Diptera
- Family: Tachinidae
- Subfamily: Dexiinae
- Tribe: Epigrimyiini
- Genus: Beskia; Brauer & von Berganstamm, 1889

Type species
- Beskia cornuta Brauer & von Berganstamm, 1889

Synonyms
- Ocypterosipha Townsend, 1894

Genus of flies

Beskia is a genus of flies in the family Tachinidae.

== Species ==
- Beskia aelops (Walker, 1849)

== Distribution ==
United States, Dominican Republic, Puerto Rico, Saint Vincent, Costa Rica, Mexico, Brazil, Ecuador, Guyana, Peru.
