= Sumichrastia =

Scientific classification
- Kingdom: Animalia
- Phylum: Arthropoda
- Class: Insecta
- Order: Diptera
- Family: Tachinidae
- Subfamily: Dexiinae
- Tribe: Dexiini
- Genus: Sumichrastia; Townsend, 1916

Type species
- Sumichrastia aurea Giglio-Tos, 1893

Genus of flies

Sumichrastia is a genus of flies in the family Tachinidae.

== Species ==
- Sumichrastia aurea (Giglio-Tos, 1893)

== Distribution ==
Mexico.
