= Trichodura =

Scientific classification
- Kingdom: Animalia
- Phylum: Arthropoda
- Class: Insecta
- Order: Diptera
- Family: Tachinidae
- Subfamily: Dexiinae
- Tribe: Dexiini
- Genus: Trichodura; Macquart, 1843

Type species
- Musca anceps Fabricius, 1805

Synonyms
- Trichoduropsis Townsend, 1919

Genus of flies

Trichodura is a genus of flies in the family Tachinidae.

== Species ==
- Trichodura amazonensis Guimarães, 1972
- Trichodura anceps (Fabricius, 1805)
- Trichodura dorsalis (Walker, 1853)
- Trichodura friburguensis Guimarães, 1972
- Trichodura lineata Townsend, 1934
- Trichodura longicauda Guimarães, 1972
- Trichodura recta Schiner, 1868
- Trichodura sabroskyi Guimarães, 1972
- Trichodura townsendi Guimarães, 1972
- Trichodura vidua Schiner, 1868
