= Macrometopa =

Scientific classification
- Kingdom: Animalia
- Phylum: Arthropoda
- Class: Insecta
- Order: Diptera
- Family: Tachinidae
- Subfamily: Dexiinae
- Tribe: Dexiini
- Genus: Macrometopa; Brauer & von Bergenstamm, 1889

Type species
- Macrometopa mexicana Brauer & von Bergenstamm, 1889

Genus of flies

Macrometopa is a genus of parasitic flies in the family Tachinidae.

== Species ==
- Macrometopa calogaster (Bigot, 1889)

== Distribution ==
Mexico.
