= Ochrocera =

Scientific classification
- Kingdom: Animalia
- Phylum: Arthropoda
- Class: Insecta
- Order: Diptera
- Family: Tachinidae
- Subfamily: Dexiinae
- Tribe: Dexiini
- Genus: Ochrocera; Townsend, 1916

Type species
- Ochrocera vaginalis Townsend, 1916

Genus of flies

Ochrocera is a genus of flies in the family Tachinidae.

== Species ==
- Ochrocera vaginalis Townsend, 1916

== Distribution ==
Canada, United States.
