= Amphitropesa =

Scientific classification
- Kingdom: Animalia
- Phylum: Arthropoda
- Clade: Pancrustacea
- Class: Insecta
- Order: Diptera
- Family: Tachinidae
- Subfamily: Dexiinae
- Tribe: Dexiini
- Genus: Amphitropesa; Townsend, 1933

Type species
- Amphitropesa elegans Townsend, 1933

Genus of flies

Amphitropesa is a genus of bristle flies in the family Tachinidae.

== Species ==
- Amphitropesa collessi Barraclough, 1992
- Amphitropesa elegans Townsend, 1933

== Distribution ==
Australia.
