= Chaetonodexodes rafaeli =

Scientific classification
- Kingdom: Animalia
- Phylum: Arthropoda
- Class: Insecta
- Order: Diptera
- Family: Tachinidae
- Subfamily: Exoristinae
- Tribe: Blondeliini
- Genus: Chaetonodexodes
- Species: C. rafaeli

Binomial name
- Chaetonodexodes rafaeli Townsend, 1916

Species of fly

Chaetonodexodes rafaeli is a species of fly in the family Tachinidae.

== Distribution ==
It can be found in Mexico.
