= Ocyrtosoma =

Scientific classification
- Kingdom: Animalia
- Phylum: Arthropoda
- Class: Insecta
- Order: Diptera
- Family: Tachinidae
- Subfamily: Dexiinae
- Tribe: Dexiini
- Genus: Ocyrtosoma; Townsend, 1912

Type species
- Cyrtosoma rufum Brauer & von Berganstamm, 1893

Synonyms
- Cyrtosoma Brauer & von Berganstamm, 1891

Genus of flies

Ocyrtosoma is a genus of flies in the family Tachinidae.

== Species ==
- Ocyrtosoma rufum (Brauer & von Berganstamm, 1893)

== Distribution ==
Mexico.
