= Tesseracephalus =

Scientific classification
- Kingdom: Animalia
- Phylum: Arthropoda
- Class: Insecta
- Order: Diptera
- Family: Tachinidae
- Subfamily: Dexiinae
- Tribe: Dexiini
- Genus: Tesseracephalus; Reinhard, 1955

Type species
- Tesseracephalus lenis Reinhard, 1955

Genus of flies

Tesseracephalus is a genus of flies in the family Tachinidae.

== Species ==
- Tesseracephalus lenis Reinhard, 1955

== Distribution ==
Mexico.
