= Geraldia =

Scientific classification
- Kingdom: Animalia
- Phylum: Arthropoda
- Class: Insecta
- Order: Diptera
- Family: Tachinidae
- Subfamily: Dexiinae
- Tribe: Dexiini
- Genus: Geraldia; Malloch, 1930

Type species
- Geraldia hirticeps Malloch, 1930

Synonyms
- Acucera Malloch, 1930

Genus of flies

Geraldia is a genus of flies in the family Tachinidae.

== Species ==
- Geraldia biseta Barraclough, 1992
- Geraldia hirticeps Malloch, 1930
- Geraldia longiplumosa Barraclough, 1992
- Geraldia media Barraclough, 1992
- Geraldia metallica Barraclough, 1992
- Geraldia montana (Malloch, 1930)
- Geraldia norrisi Barraclough, 1992
- Geraldia nuda Barraclough, 1992
- Geraldia pallida Barraclough, 1992
- Geraldia paramonovi Barraclough, 1992
- Geraldia paucipila Barraclough, 1992
- Geraldia pollinosa Barraclough, 1992
- Geraldia recessata Barraclough, 1992
- Geraldia renatae Barraclough, 1992
