= Hystrisyphona =

Scientific classification
- Kingdom: Animalia
- Phylum: Arthropoda
- Class: Insecta
- Order: Diptera
- Family: Tachinidae
- Subfamily: Dexiinae
- Tribe: Dexiini
- Genus: Hystrisyphona; Bigot, 1859

Type species
- Hystrisyphona nigra Bigot, 1859

Synonyms
- Hystrisiphona Bigot, 1883; Hystrysyphona Guimarães, 1971

Genus of flies

Hystrisyphona is a genus of flies in the family Tachinidae.

== Species ==
- Hystrisyphona nigra (Bigot, 1859)

== Distribution ==
Mexico.
