= Pirionimyia =

Scientific classification
- Kingdom: Animalia
- Phylum: Arthropoda
- Class: Insecta
- Order: Diptera
- Superfamily: Oestroidea
- Family: Tachinidae
- Genus: Pirionimyia; Townsend, 1931

Type species
- Pirionimyia paradoxa Townsend, 1931

Synonyms
- Pirionomyia Aldrich, 1934

Genus of flies

Pirionimyia is a genus of flies in the family Tachinidae.

== Species ==
- Pirionimyia paradoxa Townsend, 1931

== Distribution ==
Chile.
