= Epigrimyiini =

Scientific classification
- Domain: Eukaryota
- Kingdom: Animalia
- Phylum: Arthropoda
- Class: Insecta
- Order: Diptera
- Family: Tachinidae
- Subfamily: Dexiinae
- Tribe: Epigrimyiini; Townsend, 1908

Tribe of flies

Epigrimyiini is a tribe of bristle flies in the family Tachinidae.

== Genera ==
- Beskia Brauer & von Bergenstamm, 1889
- Epigrimyia Townsend, 1891
