= John Merton Aldrich =

American entomologist (1866–1934)

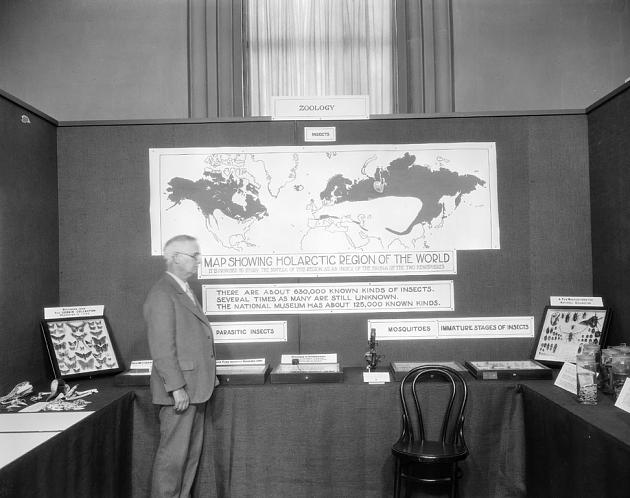
- John Merton Aldrich
- Born: January 28, 1866; Minnesota, United States
- Died: May 27, 1934 (aged 68)
- Scientific career
- Fields: entomologist

John Merton Aldrich (January 28, 1866 – May 27, 1934) was an American entomologist. Aldrich was the Associate Curator of Insects at the United States National Museum. He is considered one of the most prolific entomologists in the study of flies.

== Biography ==
John Merton Aldrich was born in Rochester, Minnesota on January 28, 1866. When he was fifteen, he moved with his family to a farm in South Dakota. He enrolled at South Dakota State University and graduated in 1888, one year early because the university president wanted to have a graduating class that year. He studied entomology briefly under Otto Lugger at the University of Minnesota and then started working at the South Dakota State Agricultural Experiment Station with the understanding that he would continue to study entomology in the winter. In 1889 he enrolled at Michigan State University and studied with entomologist Albert J. Cook. Cook suggested that he focus his studies on a single order of insects; Aldrich followed his advice and focused his career on Diptera (flies). In 1891, Aldrich was awarded an M.S. from South Dakota State University.

In 1892, Aldrich traveled to the University of Kansas where he was befriended by Samuel W. Williston who lent him money and encouraged him to stay at his house. The University awarded Aldrich a second M.S. and in 1893 he left Kansas to become the first zoology professor at the University of Idaho. In Idaho he worked on economic entomology while maintaining a focus on flies. He began to assemble his most important work, Catalogue of the North American Diptera, published by the Smithsonian in 1905. His catalog described 8.300 flies and was considered a landmark study of Diptera in America. In 1893, he married Ellen J. Roe from Brookings, South Dakota, but after only four years of marriage, his wife and their infant son died. In 1905 he remarried to Dell Smith of Moscow, Idaho.

In 1906, Aldrich took a sabbatical to attend Stanford University where he submitted his Catalogue as a doctoral thesis and was awarded a Ph.D. in 1907. When he returned to Idaho he found that a fire had destroyed the university. Fortunately for Aldrich, he had stored his personal library and insect collections off-campus.

Aldrich continued to work at the University of Idaho for another six years. In 1913 he became embroiled in the politics of academia and was terminated along with four other professors for accusing the university president of incompetence. One biographer later called the dismissal "an outrageous and unwarranted interference." Aldrich had a national reputation as a talented entomologist and he was quickly hired into the USDA Bureau of Entomology and stationed in Lafayette, Indiana. There he spent the next five years studying the agricultural pests of cultivated grains. He also wrote an important monograph on the Sarcophaga and Allies in North America (1916).

After the death of Frederick Knab in 1918, Aldrich became the Associate Curator of Insects and the Custodian of Diptera at the United States National Museum in Washington, D.C., a position he held until his death

Throughout his career, Aldrich was a prolific collector of insects and was known for his ability to find rare species. He collected widely in the western United States, Alaska, Canada, Europe and Guatemala. Many his specimens were new to science. His expertise made the National Museum a center for studies on New World Diptera. In 1928, Aldrich presented his collection of more than 45,000 specimens and more than 4,000 named species to the museum. He also donated to the museum a card catalog file of North American literature on these specimens. His collection is one of the most important general Diptera collections in the National Museum.

== Later life ==
Aldrich was active in the All Souls Unitarian-Universalist Church in Washington, D.C., where he taught religion classes. He co-founded the Thomas Say Foundation. He served as curator and custodian at the United States National Museum until his death in 1934. His archival collections are held in the Smithsonian Institution Archives. He died suddenly on May 27, 1934. He was buried in Moscow, Idaho.

== Works ==
- Aldrich, John M. and Carl Robert Osten-Sacken. A catalogue of North American Diptera (or two-winged flies). Washington, D.C.: Smithsonian Institution (1905).
- Aldrich, John M. "The North American species of parasitic two-winged flies belonging to the genus Phorocera and allied genera." Proceedings of the United States National Museum. 63:2486 (1924): 1-90.
- Aldrich, John M. "Notes on the Types of American two-winged Flies of the Genus Sarcophaga and a few related Forms described by the early Authors." "Proceedings of the United States National Museum." 78.2855 (1930): 39.
- Aldrich, John M. and ed. Samuel Wendell Williston. "Dolichopodidae and Phoridae." On the Diptera of St. Vincent. London: Royal Entomological Society of London (1896).
- Aldrich, John M. Papers on Diptera.. Washington, D.C.: Smithsonian Institution (1913).
- Aldrich, John M. Sarcophaga and allies in North America. Murphey-Bivins Co. Press (1916).
