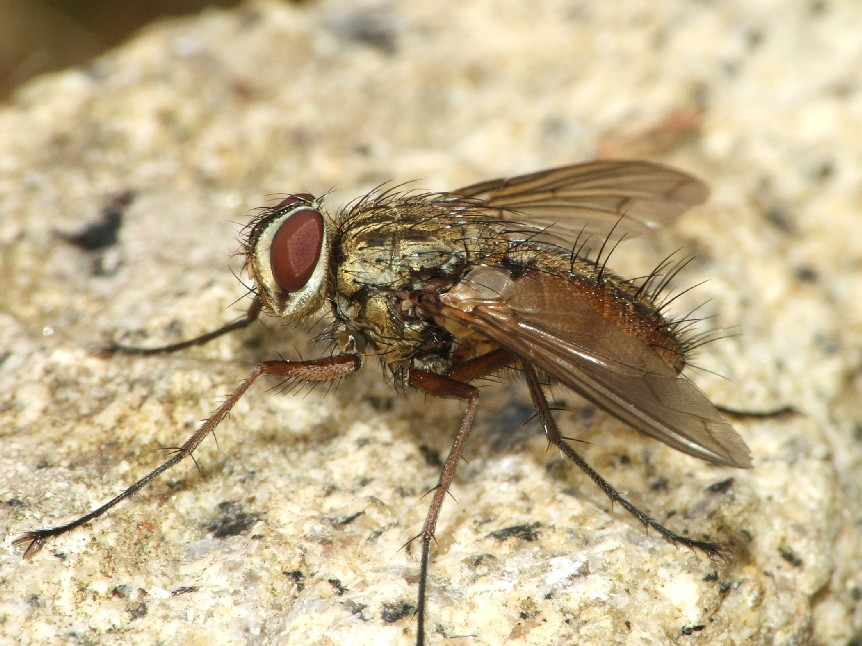
- Dexia rustica

Scientific classification
- Kingdom: Animalia
- Phylum: Arthropoda
- Clade: Pancrustacea
- Class: Insecta
- Order: Diptera
- Family: Tachinidae
- Subfamily: Dexiinae
- Tribe: Dexiini; Townsend, 1936

= Dexiini =

Tribe of flies

Dexiini is a tribe of flies in the family Tachinidae.

== Genera ==
- Aglummyia Townsend, 1912
- Amphitropesa Townsend, 1933
- Ateloglossa Coquillett, 1899
- Bathydexia Wulp, 1891
- Billaea Robineau-Desvoidy, 1830
- Callotroxis Aldrich, 1929
- Camarona Wulp, 1891
- Cantrellius Barraclough, 1992
- Carbonilla Mesnil, 1974
- Chaetocalirrhoe Townsend, 1935
- Chaetodexia Mesnil, 1976
- Chaetogyne Brauer & von Bergenstamm, 1889
- Chaetotheresia Townsend, 1931
- Charapozelia Townsend, 1927
- Cordillerodexia Townsend, 1927
- Daetaleus Aldrich, 1928
- Dasyuromyia Bigot, 1885
- Dexia Meigen, 1826
- Diaugia Perty, 1833
- Dinera Robineau-Desvoidy, 1830
- Dolichocodia Townsend, 1908
- Dolichodinera Townsend, 1935
- Echinodexia Brauer & von Bergenstamm, 1893
- Effusimentum Barraclough, 1992
- Estheria Robineau-Desvoidy, 1830
- Euchaetogyne Townsend, 1908
- Eudexia Brauer & von Bergenstamm, 1889
- Eumegaparia Townsend, 1908
- Eupododexia Villeneuve, 1915
- Exodexia Townsend, 1927
- Frontodexia Mesnil, 1976
- Gemursa Barraclough, 1992
- Geraldia Malloch, 1930
- Gigamyiopsis Reinhard, 1964
- Heterometopia Macquart, 1846
- Huascarodexia Townsend, 1919
- Hyadesimyia Bigot, 1888
- Hyosoma Aldrich, 1934
- Hystrichodexia Röder, 1886
- Hystrisyphona Bigot, 1859
- Jurinodexia Townsend, 1915
- Leptodexia Townsend, 1919
- Macrometopa Brauer & von Bergenstamm, 1889
- Mastigiomyia Reinhard, 1964
- Megaparia Wulp, 1891
- Megapariopsis Townsend, 1915
- Mesnilotrix Cerretti & O’Hara, 2016
- Microchaetina Wulp, 1891
- Microchaetogyne Townsend, 1931
- Milada Richter, 1973
- Mitannia Herting, 1987
- Mochlosoma Brauer & von Bergenstamm, 1889
- Morphodexia Townsend, 1931
- Myiodexia Cortés & Campos, 1971
- Myiomima Brauer & von Bergenstamm, 1889
- Myioscotiptera Giglio-Tos, 1893
- Neomyostoma Townsend, 1935
- Neozelia Guimarães, 1975
- Nicephorus Reinhard, 1944
- Nimioglossa Reinhard, 1945
- Notodytes Aldrich, 1934
- Oberonomyia Reinhard, 1964
- Ochrocera Townsend, 1916
- Ocyrtosoma Townsend, 1912
- Ophirodexia Townsend, 1911
- Opsotheresia Townsend, 1919
- Orestilla Reinhard, 1944
- Orthosimyia Reinhard, 1944
- Pachymyia Macquart, 1844
- Patulifrons Barraclough, 1992
- Paulipalpus Barraclough, 1992
- Pelycops Aldrich, 1934
- Phalacrophyto Townsend, 1915
- Phasiops Coquillett, 1899
- Philippodexia Townsend, 1926
- Piligena Van Emden, 1947
- Piligenoides Barraclough, 1985
- Pirionimyia Townsend, 1931
- Platydexia Van Emden, 1954
- Platyrrhinodexia Townsend, 1927
- Platytainia Macquart, 1851
- Pododexia Brauer & von Bergenstamm, 1889
- Pretoriamyia Curran, 1927
- Promegaparia Townsend, 1931
- Prophorostoma Townsend, 1927
- Prorhynchops Brauer & von Bergenstamm, 1891
- Prosena Lepeletier & Serville, 1828
- Prosenina Malloch, 1930
- Prosenoides Brauer & von Bergenstamm, 1891
- Psecacera Bigot, 1880
- Pseudodexilla O’Hara, Shima & Zhang, 2009
- Pseudodinera Brauer & von Bergenstamm, 1891
- Ptilodexia Brauer & von Bergenstamm, 1889
- Punamyocera Townsend, 1919
- Rasiliverpa Barraclough, 1992
- Rhamphinina Bigot, 1885
- Rutilotrixa Townsend, 1933
- Sarcocalirrhoe Townsend, 1928
- Sarcoprosena Townsend, 1927
- Schistostephana Townsend, 1919
- Scotiptera Macquart, 1835
- Senostoma Macquart, 1847
- Setolestes Aldrich, 1934
- Sitellitergus Reinhard, 1964
- Sturmiodexia Townsend, 1919
- Sumichrastia Townsend, 1916
- Taperamyia Townsend, 1935
- Tesseracephalus Reinhard, 1955
- Trichodura Macquart, 1844
- Trichostylum Macquart, 1851
- Trixa Meigen, 1824
- Trixiceps Villeneuve, 1936
- Trixodes Coquillett, 1902
- Tromodesiopsis Townsend, 1927
- Tropidodexia Townsend, 1915
- Tropidopsiomorpha Townsend, 1927
- Tylodexia Townsend, 1926
- Tyreomma Brauer & von Bergenstamm, 1891
- Urodexiomima Townsend, 1927
- Ursophyto Aldrich, 1926
- Ushpayacua Townsend, 1928
- Villanovia Strobl, 1910
- Xanthotheresia Townsend, 1931
- Yahuarmayoia Townsend, 1927
- Zelia Robineau-Desvoidy, 1830
- Zeliomima Mesnil, 1976
- Zeuxia Meigen, 1826
- Zeuxiotrix Mesnil, 1976
