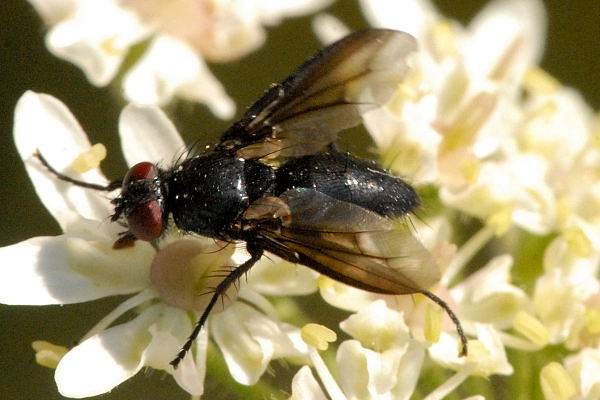
- Wagneria costata

Scientific classification
- Kingdom: Animalia
- Phylum: Arthropoda
- Clade: Pancrustacea
- Class: Insecta
- Order: Diptera
- Family: Tachinidae
- Subfamily: Dexiinae; Macquart, 1834

= Dexiinae =

Subfamily of flies

Dexiinae is a subfamily of flies in the family Tachinidae.

== Tribes & genera ==
- Tribe Dexiini
  - Aglummyia Townsend, 1912
  - Amphitropesa Townsend, 1933
  - Ateloglossa Coquillett, 1899
  - Bathydexia Wulp, 1891
  - Billaea Robineau-Desvoidy, 1830
  - Callotroxis Aldrich, 1929
  - Camarona Wulp, 1891
  - Cantrellius Barraclough, 1992
  - Carbonilla Mesnil, 1974
  - Chaetocalirrhoe Townsend, 1935
  - Chaetodexia Mesnil, 1976
  - Chaetogyne Brauer & von Bergenstamm, 1889
  - Chaetotheresia Townsend, 1931
  - Charapozelia Townsend, 1927
  - Cordillerodexia Townsend, 1927
  - Daetaleus Aldrich, 1928
  - Dasyuromyia Bigot, 1885
  - Dexia Meigen, 1826
  - Diaugia Perty, 1833
  - Dinera Robineau-Desvoidy, 1830
  - Dolichocodia Townsend, 1908
  - Dolichodinera Townsend, 1935
  - Echinodexia Brauer & von Bergenstamm, 1893
  - Effusimentum Barraclough, 1992
  - Estheria Robineau-Desvoidy, 1830
  - Euchaetogyne Townsend, 1908
  - Eudexia Brauer & von Bergenstamm, 1889
  - Eumegaparia Townsend, 1908
  - Eupododexia Villeneuve, 1915
  - Exodexia Townsend, 1927
  - Frontodexia Mesnil, 1976
  - Gemursa Barraclough, 1992
  - Geraldia Malloch, 1930
  - Gigamyiopsis Reinhard, 1964
  - Heterometopia Macquart, 1846
  - Huascarodexia Townsend, 1919
  - Hyadesimyia Bigot, 1888
  - Hyosoma Aldrich, 1934
  - Hystrichodexia Röder, 1886
  - Hystrisyphona Bigot, 1859
  - Jurinodexia Townsend, 1915
  - Leptodexia Townsend, 1919
  - Macrometopa Brauer & von Bergenstamm, 1889
  - Mastigiomyia Reinhard, 1964
  - Megaparia Wulp, 1891
  - Megapariopsis Townsend, 1915
  - Mesnilotrix Cerretti & O'Hara, 2016
  - Microchaetina Wulp, 1891
  - Microchaetogyne Townsend, 1931
  - Milada Richter, 1973
  - Mitannia Herting, 1987
  - Mochlosoma Brauer & von Bergenstamm, 1889
  - Morphodexia Townsend, 1931
  - Myiodexia Cortés & Campos, 1971
  - Myiomima Brauer & von Bergenstamm, 1889
  - Myioscotiptera Giglio-Tos, 1893
  - Neomyostoma Townsend, 1935
  - Neozelia Guimarães, 1975
  - Nicephorus Reinhard, 1944
  - Nimioglossa Reinhard, 1945
  - Notodytes Aldrich, 1934
  - Oberonomyia Reinhard, 1964
  - Ochrocera Townsend, 1916
  - Ocyrtosoma Townsend, 1912
  - Ophirodexia Townsend, 1911
  - Opsotheresia Townsend, 1919
  - Orestilla Reinhard, 1944
  - Orthosimyia Reinhard, 1944
  - Pachymyia Macquart, 1844
  - Patulifrons Barraclough, 1992
  - Paulipalpus Barraclough, 1992
  - Pelycops Aldrich, 1934
  - Phalacrophyto Townsend, 1915
  - Phasiops Coquillett, 1899
  - Philippodexia Townsend, 1926
  - Piligena Van Emden, 1947
  - Piligenoides Barraclough, 1985
  - Pirionimyia Townsend, 1931
  - Platydexia Van Emden, 1954
  - Platyrrhinodexia Townsend, 1927
  - Platytainia Macquart, 1851
  - Pododexia Brauer & von Bergenstamm, 1889
  - Pretoriamyia Curran, 1927
  - Promegaparia Townsend, 1931
  - Prophorostoma Townsend, 1927
  - Prorhynchops Brauer & von Bergenstamm, 1891
  - Prosena Lepeletier & Serville, 1828
  - Prosenina Malloch, 1930
  - Prosenoides Brauer & von Bergenstamm, 1891
  - Psecacera Bigot, 1880
  - Pseudodexilla O'Hara, Shima & Zhang, 2009
  - Pseudodinera Brauer & von Bergenstamm, 1891
  - Ptilodexia Brauer & von Bergenstamm, 1889
  - Punamyocera Townsend, 1919
  - Rasiliverpa Barraclough, 1992
  - Rhamphinina Bigot, 1885
  - Rutilotrixa Townsend, 1933
  - Sarcocalirrhoe Townsend, 1928
  - Sarcoprosena Townsend, 1927
  - Schistostephana Townsend, 1919
  - Scotiptera Macquart, 1835
  - Senostoma Macquart, 1847
  - Setolestes Aldrich, 1934
  - Sitellitergus Reinhard, 1964
  - Sturmiodexia Townsend, 1919
  - Sumichrastia Townsend, 1916
  - Taperamyia Townsend, 1935
  - Tesseracephalus Reinhard, 1955
  - Trichodura Macquart, 1844
  - Trichostylum Macquart, 1851
  - Trixa Meigen, 1824
  - Trixiceps Villeneuve, 1936
  - Trixodes Coquillett, 1902
  - Tromodesiopsis Townsend, 1927
  - Tropidodexia Townsend, 1915
  - Tropidopsiomorpha Townsend, 1927
  - Tylodexia Townsend, 1926
  - Tyreomma Brauer & von Bergenstamm, 1891
  - Urodexiomima Townsend, 1927
  - Ursophyto Aldrich, 1926
  - Ushpayacua Townsend, 1928
  - Villanovia Strobl, 1910
  - Xanthotheresia Townsend, 1931
  - Yahuarmayoia Townsend, 1927
  - Zelia Robineau-Desvoidy, 1830
  - Zeliomima Mesnil, 1976
  - Zeuxia Meigen, 1826
  - Zeuxiotrix Mesnil, 1976
- Tribe Doleschallini
  - Doleschalla Walker, 1861
  - Torocca Walker, 1859
- Tribe Dufouriini
  - Chetoptilia Rondani, 1862
  - Comyops Wulp, 1891
  - Dufouria Robineau-Desvoidy, 1830
  - Ebenia Macquart, 1846
  - Eugymnopeza Townsend, 1933
  - Euoestrophasia Townsend, 1892
  - Jamacaria Curran, 1928
  - Kambaitimyia Mesnil, 1953
  - Mesnilana Van Emden, 1945
  - Microsoma Macquart, 1855
  - Oestrophasia Brauer & von Bergenstamm, 1889
  - Pandelleia Villeneuve, 1907
  - Rhinophoroides Barraclough, 2005
  - Rondania Robineau-Desvoidy, 1850
- Tribe Epigrimyiini
  - Beskia Brauer & von Bergenstamm, 1889
  - Epigrimyia Townsend, 1891
- Tribe Eutherini
  - Euthera Loew, 1866
  - Redtenbacheria Schiner, 1861
- Tribe Freraeini
  - Freraea Robineau-Desvoidy, 1830
- Tribe Imitomyiini
  - Imitomyia Townsend, 1912
  - Proriedelia Mesnil, 1953
  - Riedelia Mesnil, 1942
- Tribe Rutiliini
  - Amphibolia Macquart, 1844
  - Chetogaster Macquart, 1851
  - Chrysopasta Brauer & von Bergenstamm, 1889
  - Formodexia Crosskey, 1973
  - Formosia Guerin-Meneville, 1843
  - Prodiaphania Townsend, 1927
  - Rutilia Robineau-Desvoidy, 1830
  - Rutilodexia Townsend, 1915
- Tribe Sophiini
  - Cordyligaster Macquart, 1844
  - Cryptosophia De Santis, 2018
  - Euantha Wulp, 1885
  - Euanthoides Townsend, 1931
  - Leptidosophia Townsend, 1931
  - Neoeuantha Townsend, 1931
  - Neosophia Guimarães, 1982
  - Sophia Robineau-Desvoidy, 1830
  - Sophiella Guimarães, 1982
- Tribe Telothyriini
  - Telothyria Wulp, 1890
- Tribe Uramyini
  - Itaplectops Townsend, 1927
  - Matucania Townsend, 1919
  - Thelairaporia Guimarães, 1980
  - Trinitodexia Townsend, 1935
  - Uramya Robineau-Desvoidy, 1830
- Tribe Voriini
  - Actinochaetopteryx Townsend, 1927
  - Actinoplagia Blanchard, 1940
  - Aldrichiopa Guimarães, 1971
  - Aldrichomyia Özdikmen, 2006
  - Alexogloblinia Cortés, 1945
  - Allothelaira Villeneuve, 1915
  - Alpinoplagia Townsend, 1931
  - Argyromima Brauer & von Bergenstamm, 1889
  - Arrhinactia Townsend, 1927
  - Ateloglutus Aldrich, 1934
  - Bahrettinia Özdikmen, 2007
  - Blepharomyia Brauer & von Bergenstamm, 1889
  - Calcager Hutton, 1901
  - Calcageria Curran, 1927
  - Campylocheta Rondani, 1859
  - Cesamorelosia Koçak & Kemal, 2010
  - Chaetodemoticus Brauer & von Bergenstamm, 1891
  - Chaetonopsis Townsend, 1915
  - Chaetoplagia Coquillett, 1895
  - Chaetovoria Villeneuve, 1920
  - Chiloclista Townsend, 1931
  - Cockerelliana Townsend, 1915
  - Comyopsis Townsend, 1919
  - Coracomyia Aldrich, 1934
  - Cowania Reinhard, 1952
  - Cyrtophloeba Rondani, 1856
  - Dexiomimops Townsend, 1926
  - Dischotrichia Cortés, 1944
  - Doliolomyia Reinhard, 1975
  - Elfriedella Mesnil, 1957
  - Engeddia Kugler, 1977
  - Eriothrix Meigen, 1803
  - Eulasiona Townsend, 1892
  - Euptilopareia Townsend, 1916
  - Feriola Mesnil, 1957
  - Ganopleuron Aldrich, 1934
  - Goniochaeta Townsend, 1891
  - Halydaia Egger, 1856
  - Haracca Richter, 1995
  - Heliaea Curran, 1934
  - Homohypochaeta Townsend, 1927
  - Hyleorus Aldrich, 1926
  - Hypochaetopsis Townsend, 1915
  - Hypovoria Villeneuve, 1913
  - Hystricovoria Townsend, 1928
  - Itamintho Townsend, 1931
  - Kirbya Robineau-Desvoidy, 1830
  - Klugia Robineau-Desvoidy, 1863
  - Leptomacquartia Townsend, 1919
  - Leptothelaira Mesnil & Shima, 1979
  - Meledonus Aldrich, 1926
  - Meleterus Aldrich, 1926
  - Metaplagia Coquillett, 1895
  - Metopomuscopteryx Townsend, 1915
  - Micronychiops Townsend, 1915
  - Microplagia Townsend, 1915
  - Minthoplagia Townsend, 1915
  - Muscopteryx Townsend, 1892
  - Myiochaeta Cortés, 1967
  - Myioclura Reinhard, 1975
  - Myiophasiopsis Townsend, 1927
  - Nanoplagia Villeneuve, 1929
  - Nardia Cerretti, 2009
  - Neochaetoplagia Blanchard, 1963
  - Neocyrtophoeba Vimmer & Soukup, 1940
  - Neopaedarium Blanchard, 1943
  - Neosolieria Townsend, 1927
  - Neotrafoiopsis Townsend, 1931
  - Nephochaetona Townsend, 1919
  - Nephoplagia Townsend, 1919
  - Nothovoria Cortés & González, 1989
  - Pachynocera Townsend, 1919
  - Paedarium Aldrich, 1926
  - Parahypochaeta Brauer & von Bergenstamm, 1891
  - Parodomyiops Townsend, 1935
  - Periscepsia Gistel, 1848
  - Peteina Meigen, 1838
  - Phaeodema Aldrich, 1934
  - Phasiophyto Townsend, 1919
  - Phyllomya Robineau-Desvoidy, 1830
  - Piriona Aldrich, 1928
  - Plagiomima Brauer & von Bergenstamm, 1891
  - Plagiomyia Curran, 1927
  - Polygaster Wulp, 1890
  - Polygastropteryx Mesnil, 1953
  - Prosenactia Blanchard, 1940
  - Prosheliomyia Brauer & von Bergenstamm, 1891
  - Prosopochaeta Macquart, 1851
  - Pseudodexia Brauer & von Bergenstamm, 1891
  - Reichardia Karsch, 1886
  - Rhamphina Macquart, 1835
  - Rhombothyria Wulp, 1891
  - Solomonilla Özdikmen, 2007
  - Spathidexia Townsend, 1912
  - Spiroglossa Doleschall, 1858
  - Squamomedina Townsend, 1934
  - Stenodexia Wulp, 1891
  - Stomina Robineau-Desvoidy, 1830
  - Subfischeria Villeneuve, 1937
  - Thelaira Robineau-Desvoidy, 1830
  - Thelairodes Wulp, 1891
  - Thryptodexia Malloch, 1926
  - Trafoia Brauer & von Bergenstamm, 1893
  - Trichodischia Bigot, 1885
  - Trichopyrrhosia Townsend, 1927
  - Trismegistomya Reinhard, 1967
  - Trochilochaeta Townsend, 1940
  - Trochilodes Coquillett, 1903
  - Uclesia Girschner, 1901
  - Uclesiella Malloch, 1938
  - Velardemyia Valencia, 1972
  - Voria Robineau-Desvoidy, 1830
  - Wagneria Robineau-Desvoidy, 1830
  - Xanthodexia Wulp, 1891
  - Xanthopteromyia Townsend, 1926
  - Zonalia Curran, 1934

Unplaced genera of Dexiinae

- Carmodymyia Thompson, 1963
- Euthyprosopiella Blanchard, 1963
- Litophasia Girschner, 1887
- Medinophyto Townsend, 1927
- Melanesomyia Barraclough, 1998
- Schlingermyia Cortés, 1967
