= Gymnophryxe inconspicua =

Scientific classification
- Kingdom: Animalia
- Phylum: Arthropoda
- Class: Insecta
- Order: Diptera
- Family: Tachinidae
- Subfamily: Exoristinae
- Tribe: Eryciini
- Genus: Gymnophryxe
- Species: G. inconspicua

Binomial name
- Gymnophryxe inconspicua (Villeneuve, 1924)

Synonyms
- Histochaeta inconspicua Villeneuve, 1924

Species of fly

Gymnophryxe inconspicua is a Palaearctic species of tachinid flies in the genus Gymnophryxe of the family Tachinidae.

== Distribution ==
Palaearctic: China, Western & Southern Europe (Greece, Italy, Spain, Turkey, France), Iran, Mongolia, Western Siberia.
