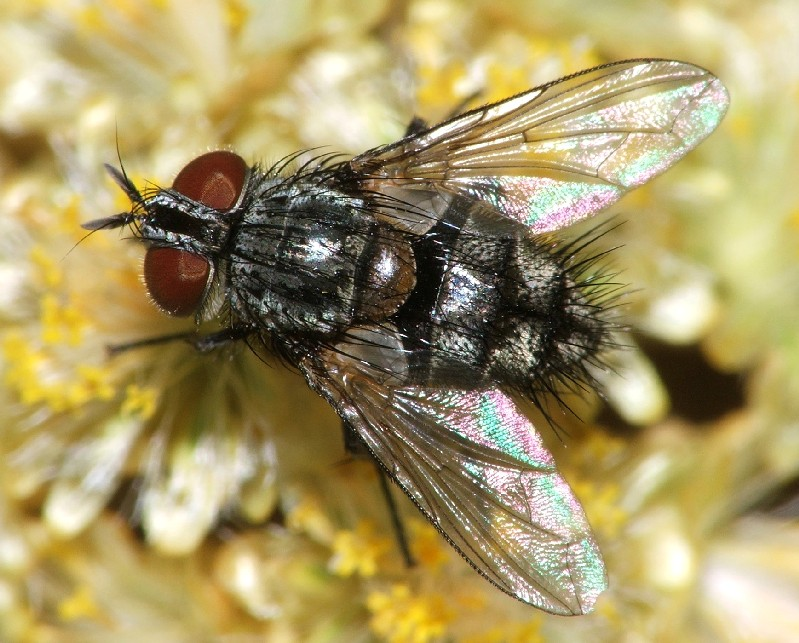
- Carcelia sp.

Scientific classification
- Kingdom: Animalia
- Phylum: Arthropoda
- Class: Insecta
- Order: Diptera
- Family: Tachinidae
- Subfamily: Exoristinae
- Tribe: Eryciini
- Genus: Carcelia; Robineau-Desvoidy, 1830

Type species
- Carcelia bombylans Robineau-Desvoidy, 1830

Synonyms
- Chetoliga Rondani, 1856; Carcellia Rondani, 1859; Chaetolyga Scudder, 1882; Chetolyga Bigot, 1889; Parexorista Brauer & von Bergenstamm, 1889; Paraexorista Brauer & von Bergenstamm, 1889; Chatolyga Bigot, 1892; Gymnocarcelia Townsend, 1919; Carcalia Townsend, 1927; Carceliopsis Townsend, 1927; Senexorista Townsend, 1927; Asiocarcelia Baranov, 1934; Elassomyia Reinhard, 1967; Chaetolyga Herting, 1984

= Carcelia =

Genus of flies

Carcelia is a genus of flies in the family Tachinidae.

== Species ==
Subgenus Carcelia Robineau-Desvoidy, 1830

- Carcelia albifacies Townsend, 1927
- Carcelia alpestris Herting, 1966
- Carcelia amplexa (Coquillett, 1897)
- Carcelia angustipalpis Chao & Liang, 2002
- Carcelia atricosta Herting, 1961
- Carcelia auripulvis Chao & Liang, 2002
- Carcelia bombylans Robineau-Desvoidy, 1830
- Carcelia brevipilosa Chao & Liang, 1986
- Carcelia candidae Shima, 1981
- Carcelia canutipulvera Chao & Liang, 1986
- Carcelia caudata Baranov, 1931
- Carcelia caudatella Baranov, 1932
- Carcelia diacrisiae Sellers, 1943
- Carcelia dubia (Brauer & von Bergenstamm, 1891)
- Carcelia falx Chao & Liang, 1986
- Carcelia flavimaculata Sun & Chao, 1993
- Carcelia formosa (Aldrich & Webber, 1924)
- Carcelia gnava (Meigen, 1824)
- Carcelia hamata Chao & Liang, 1986
- Carcelia hardyi (Curran, 1938)
- Carcelia iliaca (Ratzeburg, 1840)
- Carcelia illiberisi Chao & Liang, 2002
- Carcelia inculta (Wiedemann, 1830)
- Carcelia inflatipalpis (Aldrich & Webber, 1924)
- Carcelia iridipennis (Wulp, 1893)
- Carcelia kowarzi Villeneuve, 1912
- Carcelia lagoae (Townsend, 1891)
- Carcelia languida (Walker, 1858)
- Carcelia laxifrons Villeneuve, 1912
- Carcelia longichaeta Chao & Shi, 1982
- Carcelia lucorum (Meigen, 1824)
- Carcelia malayana Baranov, 1934
- Carcelia matsukarehae (Shima, 1969)
- Carcelia nigrantennata Chao & Liang, 1986
- Carcelia noumeensis Mesnil, 1968
- Carcelia nudioculata Villeneuve, 1938
- Carcelia olenensis Sellers, 1943
- Carcelia perplexa Sellers, 1943
- Carcelia piligena Mesnil, 1953
- Carcelia protuberans (Aldrich & Webber, 1924)
- Carcelia pseudocaudata (Baranov, 1934)
- Carcelia puberula Mesnil, 1941
- Carcelia rasa (Macquart, 1850)
- Carcelia rasella Baranov, 1931
- Carcelia rasoides Baranov, 1931
- Carcelia reclinata (Aldrich & Webber, 1924)
- Carcelia rutilloides Baranov, 1931
- Carcelia setosella Baranov, 1931
- Carcelia sexta Baranov, 1931
- Carcelia sumatrana Townsend, 1927
- Carcelia sumatrensis (Townsend, 1927)
- Carcelia tasmanica Robineau-Desvoidy, 1863
- Carcelia tenuiforceps (Reinhard, 1964)
- Carcelia thalpocharidis Herting, 1959
- Carcelia tjibodana Townsend, 1927
- Carcelia townsendi Crosskey, 1976
- Carcelia venusa (Curran, 1928)
- Carcelia vibrissata Chao & Zhou, 1992
- Carcelia vicinalis Cantrell, 1985
- Carcelia yalensis Sellers, 1943
- Carcelia yongshunensis Sun & Chao, 1993

Subgenus Carcelita Mesnil, 1975

- Carcelia abrelicta Mesnil, 1950
- Carcelia aequalis Villeneuve, 1939
- Carcelia angulicornis Villeneuve, 1916
- Carcelia argyriceps (Curran, 1927)
- Carcelia atricans Mesnil, 1955
- Carcelia bigoti (Jaennicke, 1867)
- Carcelia forcipata Mesnil, 1977
- Carcelia inusta Mesnil, 1950
- Carcelia keiseri Mesnil, 1977
- Carcelia lindneri Mesnil, 1959
- Carcelia lucidula Villeneuve, 1941
- Carcelia normula (Curran, 1927)
- Carcelia oculata (Villeneuve, 1910)
- Carcelia orbitalis (Curran, 1927)
- Carcelia patellata Mesnil, 1977
- Carcelia pellex Mesnil, 1950
- Carcelia persimilis Mesnil, 1950
- Carcelia vaga (Curran, 1927)
- Carcelia vara (Curran, 1927)
- Carcelia vexor (Curran, 1927)

Subgenus Cargilla Richter, 1980

- Carcelia transbaicalica Richter, 1980

Subgenus Catacarcelia Townsend, 1927

- Carcelia burnsi Cantrell, 1985
- Carcelia kockiana (Townsend, 1927)
- Carcelia talwurrapin Cantrell, 1985

Subgenus Euryclea Robineau-Desvoidy, 1863

- Carcelia ceylanica (Brauer & von Bergenstamm, 1891)
- Carcelia clava Chao & Liang, 1986
- Carcelia delicatula Mesnil, 1968
- Carcelia falenaria (Rondani, 1859)
- Carcelia flava Chao & Liang, 1986
- Carcelia flavitibia Cantrell, 1985
- Carcelia hemimacquartioides (Baranov, 1934)
- Carcelia latistylata (Baranov, 1934)
- Carcelia longimana (Mesnil, 1953)
- Carcelia pallensa Chao & Liang, 2002
- Carcelia setifrons Mesnil, 1949
- Carcelia tibialis (Robineau-Desvoidy, 1863)
- Carcelia villicauda Chao & Liang, 1986
- Carcelia xanthohirta Chao & Liang, 1986

Subgenus Myxocarcelia Baranov, 1934

- Carcelia aberrans Baranov, 1931
- Carcelia europea Richter, 1977
- Carcelia excisoides (Mesnil, 1957)
- Carcelia hirsuta Baranov, 1931
- Carcelia pilosella Baranov, 1931
- Carcelia shibuyai (Shima, 1968)
- Carcelia takanoi (Mesnil, 1957)
- Carcelia yakushimana (Shima, 1968)

Unplaced to subgenus

- Carcelia adjuncta (Wulp, 1890)
- Carcelia argenticeps (Wulp, 1890)
- Carcelia badalingensis Chao & Liang, 2009
- Carcelia brevis (Wulp, 1890)
- Carcelia dilaticornis Mesnil, 1950
- Carcelia ethillamima Cerretti, 2019
- Carcelia flavirostris (Wulp, 1890)
- Carcelia griseomicans (Wulp, 1890)
- Carcelia halliana Cortés, 1945
- Carcelia longicornis (Wulp, 1890)
- Carcelia normula (Wulp, 1890)
- Carcelia oblectanea Mesnil, 1950
- Carcelia oblimata Mesnil, 1950
- Carcelia obliterata Mesnil, 1950
- Carcelia peraequalis Mesnil, 1950.
- Carcelia pesitra Cantrell, 1985
- Carcelia rubrella Robineau-Desvoidy, 1830
- Carcelia stackelbergi (Mesnil, 1963)
- Carcelia tentans (Walker, 1858)
