= Pseudoperichaeta =

Scientific classification
- Kingdom: Animalia
- Phylum: Arthropoda
- Class: Insecta
- Order: Diptera
- Family: Tachinidae
- Subfamily: Exoristinae
- Tribe: Eryciini
- Genus: Pseudoperichaeta; Brauer & von Bergenstamm, 1889

Type species
- Pseudoperichaeta major (= Phryxe palesioidea Robineau-Desvoidy, 1830) Brauer & von Bergenstamm, 1889

Synonyms
- Achaetoneurilla Mesnil, 1939; Masicerella Gardner, 1940; Euhapalivora Gardner, 1940

Genus of flies

Pseudoperichaeta is a genus of flies in the family Tachinidae.

== Species ==
- Pseudoperichaeta indica Gardner, 1940
- Pseudoperichaeta indistincta Gardner, 1940
- Pseudoperichaeta laevis Villeneuve, 1932
- Pseudoperichaeta leo (Curran, 1941)
- Pseudoperichaeta madecassa Mesnil, 1939
- Pseudoperichaeta monochaeta Mesnil, 1952
- Pseudoperichaeta nestor (Curran, 1927)
- Pseudoperichaeta nigrolineata (Walker, 1853)
- Pseudoperichaeta pacta Villeneuve, 1932
- Pseudoperichaeta palesioidea (Robineau-Desvoidy, 1830)
- Pseudoperichaeta roseanella (Baranov, 1936)
- Pseudoperichaeta sallax (Curran, 1927)
