= Senometopia =

Scientific classification
- Kingdom: Animalia
- Phylum: Arthropoda
- Class: Insecta
- Order: Diptera
- Family: Tachinidae
- Subfamily: Exoristinae
- Tribe: Eryciini
- Genus: Senometopia; Macquart, 1834

Type species
- Carcelia aurifrons Robineau-Desvoidy, 1830

Synonyms
- Stenometopia Agassiz, 1846; Eocarcelia Townsend, 1919; Eocarceliopsis Townsend, 1928; Tricarcelia Baranov, 1934; Eucarcelia Baranov, 1934; Dicephalomyia Malloch, 1935

Genus of flies

Senometopia is a genus of flies in the family Tachinidae.

== Species ==
- Senometopia albatella (Villeneuve, 1941)
- Senometopia argentifera Shima & Tachi, 2022
- Senometopia aurata (Townsend, 1927)
- Senometopia bakeri (Townsend, 1928)
- Senometopia borneoensis Shima & Tachi, 2022
- Senometopia breviforceps Shima & Tachi, 2022
- Senometopia brevipilosa Shima & Tachi, 2022
- Senometopia cariniforceps (Chao & Liang, 2002)
- Senometopia ceylanica (Townsend, 1919)
- Senometopia cinerea (Brauer & von Berganstamm, 1891)
- Senometopia clara (Chao & Liang, 2002)
- Senometopia confundens (Rondani, 1859)
- Senometopia curtipennis Shima & Tachi, 2022
- Senometopia dammermani (Baranov, 1934)
- Senometopia evolans (Wiedemann, 1830)
- Senometopia excisa (Fallén, 1820)
- Senometopia fallax Shima & Tachi, 2022
- Senometopia flavicosta Shima & Tachi, 2022
- Senometopia fortiseta Shima & Tachi, 2022
- Senometopia fujianensis (Chao & Liang, 2002)
- Senometopia gracilis Shima & Tachi, 2022
- Senometopia grossa (Baranov, 1934)
- Senometopia hectica (Speiser, 1910)
- Senometopia helvola Shima & Tachi, 2022
- Senometopia illota (Curran, 1927)
- Senometopia indica (Baranov, 1934)
- Senometopia interfrontalia (Chao & Liang, 1986)
- Senometopia intermedia (Herting, 1960)
- Senometopia jilinensis (Chao & Liang, 2002)
- Senometopia judicabilis (Mesnil, 1949)
- Senometopia kanoi Shima & Tachi, 2022
- Senometopia khaoyai Shima & Tachi, 2022
- Senometopia kockensis Shima & Tachi, 2022
- Senometopia kockiana (Townsend, 1927)
- Senometopia koreana Shima & Tachi, 2022
- Senometopia kurahashii Shima & Tachi, 2022
- Senometopia laetifica (Mesnil, 1949)
- Senometopia laticauda (Liang & Chao, 1994)
- Senometopia laticincta Shima & Tachi, 2022
- Senometopia lena (Richter, 1980)
- Senometopia leucomelas Shima & Tachi, 2022
- Senometopia longiepandriuma (Chao & Liang, 2002)
- Senometopia luteipes Shima & Tachi, 2022
- Senometopia luzonensis Shima & Tachi, 2022
- Senometopia micronychia Shima & Tachi, 2022
- Senometopia mimoexcisa (Chao & Liang, 2002)
- Senometopia minor Shima & Tachi, 2022
- Senometopia montana Shima & Tachi, 2022
- Senometopia monticola Shima & Tachi, 2022
- Senometopia muscoides (Walker, 1856)
- Senometopia nigripalpis Shima & Tachi, 2022
- Senometopia norma (Curran, 1927)
- Senometopia pakistana Shima & Tachi, 2022
- Senometopia papei Shima & Tachi, 2022
- Senometopia parviseta Shima & Tachi, 2022
- Senometopia persimilis Shima & Tachi, 2022
- Senometopia pilifera Shima & Tachi, 2022
- Senometopia pilosa (Baranov, 1931)
- Senometopia pollinosa (Mesnil, 1941)
- Senometopia polyvalens (Villeneuve, 1929)
- Senometopia prima (Baranov, 1931)
- Senometopia pseudopolyvalens Shima & Tachi, 2022
- Senometopia quadrata Shima & Tachi, 2022
- Senometopia quarta (Baranov, 1931)
- Senometopia quinta (Baranov, 1931)
- Senometopia retrosa Shima & Tachi, 2022
- Senometopia ridibunda (Walker, 1859)
- Senometopia rondaniella (Baranov, 1934)
- Senometopia rufa (Baranov, 1931)
- Senometopia rufiventris (Malloch, 1935)
- Senometopia sabahensis Shima & Tachi, 2022
- Senometopia separata (Rondani, 1859)
- Senometopia setiforceps Shima & Tachi, 2022
- Senometopia shimai (Chao & Liang, 2002)
- Senometopia singgalangia (Townsend, 1927)
- Senometopia sumatrana (Townsend, 1927)
- Senometopia sundana Shima & Tachi, 2022
- Senometopia susurrans (Rondani, 1859)
- Senometopia tentans (Walker, 1858)
- Senometopia tenuiseta Shima & Tachi, 2022
- Senometopia tertia (Baranov, 1931)
- Senometopia triangulata Shima & Tachi, 2022
- Senometopia trisetosa Shima & Tachi, 2022
- Senometopia tuberculata Shima & Tachi, 2022
- Senometopia vietnamensis Shima & Tachi, 2022
- Senometopia volusella Shima & Tachi, 2022
- Senometopia xishuangbannanica (Chao & Liang, 2002)
- Senometopia yagoi Shima & Tachi, 2022
