= Intrapales =

Scientific classification
- Kingdom: Animalia
- Phylum: Arthropoda
- Class: Insecta
- Order: Diptera
- Family: Tachinidae
- Subfamily: Exoristinae
- Tribe: Eryciini
- Genus: Gymnophryxe; Villeneuve, 1938

Type species
- Intrapales remotella Villeneuve, 1938

Genus of flies

Hypersara is a genus of parasitic flies in the family Tachinidae.

== Species ==
- Intrapales hirsuta Mesnil, 1977
- Intrapales insularis Mesnil, 1977
- Intrapales remotella Villeneuve, 1938
