= Thelyconychia =

Scientific classification
- Kingdom: Animalia
- Phylum: Arthropoda
- Class: Insecta
- Order: Diptera
- Family: Tachinidae
- Subfamily: Exoristinae
- Tribe: Eryciini
- Genus: Thelyconychia; Brauer & von Berganstamm, 1889

Type species
- Ceromasia solivaga Rondani, 1861

Synonyms
- Torinamyia Mesnil, 1959

Genus of flies

Thelyconychia is a genus of flies in the family Tachinidae.

== Species ==
- Thelyconychia aplomyioides (Villeneuve, 1936)
- Thelyconychia delicatula (Mesnil, 1959)
- Thelyconychia discalis Mesnil, 1957
- Thelyconychia femorata (Mesnil, 1957)
- Thelyconychia marconychia Mesnil, 1970
- Thelyconychia solivaga (Rondani, 1861)
- Thelyconychia vicinalis (Baranov, 1931)
- Thelyconychia vidua Mesnil, 1964
