= Sisyropa =

Scientific classification
- Kingdom: Animalia
- Phylum: Arthropoda
- Class: Insecta
- Order: Diptera
- Family: Tachinidae
- Subfamily: Exoristinae
- Tribe: Eryciini
- Genus: Sisyropa; Brauer & von Berganstamm, 1889

Type species
- Tachina thermophila Wiedemann, 1830

Synonyms
- Ctenophoroceropsis Baranov, 1938; Oxexorista Townsend, 1912; Poujadea Mesnil, 1950; Stylurodoria Townsend, 1933; Stylurodoxia Neave, 1940

Genus of flies

Sisyropa is a genus of flies in the family Tachinidae.

== Species ==
- Sisyropa alypiae Sellers, 1943
- Sisyropa argyrata Mesnil, 1950
- Sisyropa boveyi Mesnil, 1958
- Sisyropa curvipes (Wulp, 1893)
- Sisyropa disparis (Reinhard, 1959)
- Sisyropa eudryae (Townsend, 1892)
- Sisyropa formosa Mesnil, 1944
- Sisyropa ghani Mesnil, 1968
- Sisyropa heterusiae (Coquillett, 1899)
- Sisyropa insolita (Curran, 1927)
- Sisyropa madecassa Mesnil, 1944
- Sisyropa negator (Curran, 1927)
- Sisyropa painei Mesnil, 1964
- Sisyropa picta (Baranov, 1935)
- Sisyropa prominens (Walker, 1859)
- Sisyropa prosopina Brauer & von Berganstamm, 1891
- Sisyropa rufiventris Brauer & von Berganstamm, 1891
- Sisyropa stylata (Townsend, 1933)
- Sisyropa subdistincta (Villeneuve, 1916)
- Sisyropa thermophila (Wiedemann, 1830)
- Sisyropa yerburyi (Baranov, 1938)
