= Gymnophryxe nudigena =

Scientific classification
- Kingdom: Animalia
- Phylum: Arthropoda
- Class: Insecta
- Order: Diptera
- Family: Tachinidae
- Subfamily: Exoristinae
- Tribe: Eryciini
- Genus: Gymnophryxe
- Species: G. nudigena

Binomial name
- Gymnophryxe nudigena (Villeneuve)

Synonyms
- Ceratochaeta (Gymnophryxe) nudigena Villeneuve, 1922

Species of fly

Gymnophryxe nudigena is a Palaearctic species of tachinid flies in the genus Gymnophryxe of the family Tachinidae.

== Distribution ==
Palaearctic: Israel, Algeria.
