= Hypersara =

Scientific classification
- Kingdom: Animalia
- Phylum: Arthropoda
- Class: Insecta
- Order: Diptera
- Family: Tachinidae
- Subfamily: Exoristinae
- Tribe: Eryciini
- Genus: Gymnophryxe; Villeneuve, 1935

Type species
- Hypersara argentata Villeneuve, 1935

Genus of flies

Hypersara is a genus of parasitic flies in the family Tachinidae.

== Species ==
- Hypersara angustifrons (Malloch, 1935)
- Hypersara argentata Villeneuve, 1935
- Hypersara metopina Mesnil, 1953
