= Alsomyia =

Scientific classification
- Kingdom: Animalia
- Phylum: Arthropoda
- Clade: Pancrustacea
- Class: Insecta
- Order: Diptera
- Family: Tachinidae
- Subfamily: Exoristinae
- Tribe: Eryciini
- Genus: Alsomyia; Brauer & von Bergenstamm, 1891

Type species
- Alsomyia gymnodiscus (= Exorista capillata Rondani, 1859) Brauer & von Bergenstamm, 1891

Genus of flies

Alsomyia is a genus of flies in the family Tachinidae.

== Species ==
- Alsomyia capillata Rondani, 1859
- Alsomyia keili Ziegler, 1995
- Alsomyia olfaciens (Pandellé, 1896)
- Alsomyia splendens Richter, 1994

Alsomyia chloronitens Mesnil, 1977 was moved to Nealsomyia.
