= Cestonioptera =

Scientific classification
- Kingdom: Animalia
- Phylum: Arthropoda
- Clade: Pancrustacea
- Class: Insecta
- Order: Diptera
- Family: Tachinidae
- Subfamily: Exoristinae
- Tribe: Eryciini
- Genus: Cestonioptera; Villeneuve, 1939

Type species
- Cestonioptera mesnili Villeneuve, 1939

Synonyms
- Cestonoptera Cooper & O’Hara, 1996

Genus of flies

Cestonioptera is a monotypic genus of bristle flies in the family Tachinidae.

== Species ==
- Cestonioptera mesnili Villeneuve, 1939

== Distribution ==
This genus has a Palearctic distribution and has been sighted in Israel and Tunisia.
