= Afrophylax =

Scientific classification
- Kingdom: Animalia
- Phylum: Arthropoda
- Class: Insecta
- Order: Diptera
- Family: Tachinidae
- Subfamily: Exoristinae
- Tribe: Eryciini
- Genus: Afrophylax; Cerretti & O’Hara, 2016

Type species
- Sturmia aureiventris Villeneuve, 1910

Genus of flies

Afrophylax is a monotypic genus of flies in the family Tachinidae.

== Species ==
- Afrophylax aureiventris (Villeneuve, 1910)

== Distribution ==
Democratic Republic of the Congo, Nigeria, Sierra Leone, Tanzania, Uganda.
