= Gymnophryxe modesta =

Scientific classification
- Kingdom: Animalia
- Phylum: Arthropoda
- Class: Insecta
- Order: Diptera
- Family: Tachinidae
- Subfamily: Exoristinae
- Tribe: Eryciini
- Genus: Gymnophryxe
- Species: G. modesta

Binomial name
- Gymnophryxe modesta Herting, 1973

Species of fly

Gymnophryxe modesta is a Palaearctic species of tachinid flies in the genus Gymnophryxe of the family Tachinidae.

== Distribution ==
Palaearctic: Mongolia & China.
