= Pimelimyia =

Scientific classification
- Kingdom: Animalia
- Phylum: Arthropoda
- Class: Insecta
- Order: Diptera
- Family: Tachinidae
- Subfamily: Exoristinae
- Tribe: Goniini
- Genus: Pimelimyia; Mesnil, 1949

Type species
- Sturima russata Villeneuve, 1943

Genus of flies

Pimelimyia is a genus of flies in the family Tachinidae.

== Species ==
- Pimelimyia grossa Mesnil, 1959
- Pimelimyia insularis (Villeneuve, 1915)
- Pimelimyia natalensis (Curran, 1927)
- Pimelimyia rufina (Curran, 1927)
- Pimelimyia rufula (Villeneuve, 1943)
- Pimelimyia russata (Villeneuve, 1943)
- Pimelimyia semitestacea (Villeneuve, 1916)
