= Periarchiclops =

Scientific classification
- Kingdom: Animalia
- Phylum: Arthropoda
- Class: Insecta
- Order: Diptera
- Family: Tachinidae
- Subfamily: Exoristinae
- Tribe: Eryciini
- Genus: Periarchiclops; Villeneuve, 1924

Type species
- Tachina scutellaris Fallén, 1820

Synonyms
- Euprosopaea Belanovsky, 1953

Genus of flies

Periarchiclops is a genus of flies in the family Tachinidae.

== Species ==
- Periarchiclops scutellaris (Fallén, 1820)
