= Gymnophryxe claripennis =

Scientific classification
- Kingdom: Animalia
- Phylum: Arthropoda
- Class: Insecta
- Order: Diptera
- Family: Tachinidae
- Subfamily: Exoristinae
- Tribe: Eryciini
- Genus: Gymnophryxe
- Species: G. claripennis

Binomial name
- Gymnophryxe claripennis (Reinhard, 1943)

Synonyms
- Histochaeta claripennis Reinhard, 1943

Species of fly

Gymnophryxe claripennis is a Nearctic species of tachinid flies in the genus Gymnophryxe of the family Tachinidae.

== Distribution ==
United States, Canada.
