= Amphicestonia =

Scientific classification
- Kingdom: Animalia
- Phylum: Arthropoda
- Class: Insecta
- Order: Diptera
- Family: Tachinidae
- Subfamily: Exoristinae
- Tribe: Eryciini
- Genus: Amphicestonia; Villeneuve, 1939

Type species
- Amphicestonia dispar Villeneuve, 1939

Genus of flies

Amphicestonia is a genus of bristle flies in the family Tachinidae.

== Species ==
- Amphicestonia dispar Villeneuve, 1939
- Amphicestonia perplexa Mesnil, 1963
