= Cestonia cineraria =

Scientific classification
- Kingdom: Animalia
- Phylum: Arthropoda
- Clade: Pancrustacea
- Class: Insecta
- Order: Diptera
- Family: Tachinidae
- Subfamily: Exoristinae
- Tribe: Eryciini
- Genus: Cestonia
- Species: C. cineraria

Binomial name
- Cestonia cineraria Rondani, 1861

Species of fly

Cestonia cineraria is a European species of fly in the family Tachinidae.

== Distribution ==
Croatia, Italy, Spain, France, Switzerland, Israel, Egypt, Azerbaijan.
