= Chaetostigmoptera =

Scientific classification
- Kingdom: Animalia
- Phylum: Arthropoda
- Clade: Pancrustacea
- Class: Insecta
- Order: Diptera
- Family: Tachinidae
- Subfamily: Exoristinae
- Tribe: Blondeliini
- Genus: Chaetostigmoptera; Townsend, 1916

Type species
- Chaetophleps crassinervis Walton, 1913

Synonyms
- Clausicellana Curran, 1927; Paracraspedothrix Villeneuve, 1920

Genus of flies

Chaetostigmoptera is a genus of flies in the family Tachinidae.

== Species ==
- C. angulicornis (Curran, 1930)
- C. crassinervis (Walton, 1913)
- C. manca (Greene, 1934)
- C. mitis (Curran, 1927)
- C. montivaga (Villeneuve, 1919)
- C. rostrata (Coquillett, 1898)
