= Carceliathrix =

Scientific classification
- Kingdom: Animalia
- Phylum: Arthropoda
- Class: Insecta
- Order: Diptera
- Family: Tachinidae
- Subfamily: Exoristinae
- Tribe: Eryciini
- Genus: Carceliathrix; Cerretti & O’Hara, 2016

Type species
- Phorocera crassipalpis Villeneuve, 1938

Genus of flies

Carceliathrix is a genus of flies in the family Tachinidae.

== Species ==
- Carceliathrix crassipalpis (Villeneuve, 1938)

== Distribution ==
Democratic Republic of the Congo.
