= Glaurocara =

Scientific classification
- Kingdom: Animalia
- Phylum: Arthropoda
- Class: Insecta
- Order: Diptera
- Family: Tachinidae
- Subfamily: Tachininae
- Tribe: Glaurocarini
- Genus: Glaurocara; Thomson, 1869

Type species
- Glaurocara flava Thomson, 1869

Synonyms
- Dysoestrus Villeneuve, 1937; Oestrocara Townsend, 1935; Oestrocharis Villeneuve, 1927

Genus of flies

Glaurocara is a genus of flies in the family Tachinidae.

== Species ==
- Glaurocara flava Thomson, 1869
- Glaurocara flavicornis (Malloch, 1927)
- Glaurocara ghilarovi Richter, 1988
- Glaurocara glauca Mesnil, 1978
- Glaurocara grandipennis Mesnil, 1978
- Glaurocara leleupi (Verbeke, 1960)
- Glaurocara livida Mesnil, 1978
- Glaurocara lucidula Richter, 1988
- Glaurocara nigrescens Mesnil, 1978
- Glaurocara nigrocornis (Malloch, 1927)
- Glaurocara nitidiventris (Malloch, 1927)
- Glaurocara obesa (Villeneuve, 1937)
- Glaurocara punctigera (Malloch, 1933)
- Glaurocara russea Mesnil, 1978
- Glaurocara townsendi Emden, 1960
- Glaurocara violacea Mesnil, 1978
