= Buquetia =

Scientific classification
- Kingdom: Animalia
- Phylum: Arthropoda
- Clade: Pancrustacea
- Class: Insecta
- Order: Diptera
- Family: Tachinidae
- Subfamily: Exoristinae
- Tribe: Eryciini
- Genus: Buquetia; Robineau-Desvoidy, 1847

Type species
- Buquetia musca Robineau-Desvoidy, 1847

Synonyms
- Eipogona Rondani, 1868; Eupogona Brauer & von Bergenstamm, 1889

Genus of flies

Buquetia musca

Buquetia is a genus of flies in the family Tachinidae.

== Species ==
- Buquetia hilaris (Baranov, 1939)
- Buquetia musca Robineau-Desvoidy, 1847
- Buquetia obscura (Coquillett, 1897)
