= Thecocarcelia =

Scientific classification
- Kingdom: Animalia
- Phylum: Arthropoda
- Class: Insecta
- Order: Diptera
- Family: Tachinidae
- Subfamily: Exoristinae
- Tribe: Eryciini
- Genus: Thecocarcelia; Townsend, 1933

Type species
- Argyrophylax pelmatoprocta Brauer & von Bergenstamm, 1891

Synonyms
- Erycoides Belanovsky, 1953; Thelycarcelia Townsend, 1933

Genus of flies

Thecocarcelia is a genus of flies in the family Tachinidae.

== Species ==
- Thecocarcelia acutangulata (Macquart, 1851)
- Thecocarcelia atricauda (Mesnil, 1967)
- Thecocarcelia ebenina Mesnil, 1950
- Thecocarcelia flavicosta Zeegers, 2007
- Thecocarcelia latifrons Mesnil, 1949
- Thecocarcelia latimana Mesnil, 1950
- Thecocarcelia linearifrons (Wulp, 1893)
- Thecocarcelia melanohalterata Chao & Jin, 1984
- Thecocarcelia nigrapex Shima, 1998
- Thecocarcelia novella (Mesnil, 1957)
- Thecocarcelia ochracea Shima, 1998
- Thecocarcelia oculata (Baranov, 1935)
- Thecocarcelia parnarae Chao, 1976
- Thecocarcelia pauciseta Mesnil, 1977
- Thecocarcelia robusta Mesnil, 1950
- Thecocarcelia sumatrana (Baranov, 1932)
- Thecocarcelia thrix (Townsend, 1933)
- Thecocarcelia trichops Herting, 1967
- Thecocarcelia ventralis Mesnil, 1959
- Thecocarcelia vibrissata Mesnil, 1977
