= Eophyllophila =

Scientific classification
- Kingdom: Animalia
- Phylum: Arthropoda
- Clade: Pancrustacea
- Class: Insecta
- Order: Diptera
- Family: Tachinidae
- Subfamily: Exoristinae
- Tribe: Blondeliini
- Genus: Eophyllophila; Townsend, 1926

Type species
- Eophyllophila elegans Townsend, 1926

Genus of flies

Eophyllophila is a genus of flies in the family Tachinidae.

== Species ==
- Eophyllophila africana Villeneuve, 1935
- Eophyllophila elegans Townsend, 1926
- Eophyllophila filipes Townsend, 1927
- Eophyllophila includens (Walker, 1859)
