= Gymnophryxe carthaginiensis =

Scientific classification
- Kingdom: Animalia
- Phylum: Arthropoda
- Class: Insecta
- Order: Diptera
- Family: Tachinidae
- Subfamily: Exoristinae
- Tribe: Eryciini
- Genus: Gymnophryxe
- Species: G. carthaginiensis

Binomial name
- Gymnophryxe carthaginiensis (Bischof, 1900)

Synonyms
- Archiclops carthaginiensis Bischof, 1900

Species of fly

Gymnophryxe carthaginiensis is a Palaearctic species of tachinid flies in the genus Gymnophryxe of the family Tachinidae.

== Distribution ==
Palaearctic: China, Southern Europe & North Africa.
