= Hapalioloemus macheralis =

Scientific classification
- Kingdom: Animalia
- Phylum: Arthropoda
- Class: Insecta
- Order: Diptera
- Family: Tachinidae
- Subfamily: Exoristinae
- Tribe: Goniini
- Genus: Hapalioloemus
- Species: H. macheralis

Binomial name
- Hapalioloemus macheralis Baranov, 1934

Species of fly

Hapalioloemus macheralis is a species of fly in the family Tachinidae.

== Distribution ==
India.
