= Cestonionerva =

Scientific classification
- Kingdom: Animalia
- Phylum: Arthropoda
- Class: Insecta
- Order: Diptera
- Family: Tachinidae
- Subfamily: Exoristinae
- Tribe: Eryciini
- Genus: Cestonionerva; Villeneuve, 1929

Type species
- Conogaster petiolata Villeneuve, 1910

Genus of flies

Cestonionerva is a genus of flies in the family Tachinidae.

== Species ==
- Cestonionerva latigena Villeneuve, 1939
- Cestonionerva petiolata (Villeneuve, 1910)
- Cestonionerva punctata Kugler, 1980
