= Weingaertneriella =

Scientific classification
- Kingdom: Animalia
- Phylum: Arthropoda
- Class: Insecta
- Order: Diptera
- Family: Tachinidae
- Subfamily: Exoristinae
- Tribe: Eryciini
- Genus: Weingaertneriella; Baranov, 1932

Type species
- Sturmia paradoxalis Baranov, 1932

Genus of flies

Weingaertneriella is a genus of flies in the family Tachinidae.

== Species ==
- Weingaertneriella longiseta (Wulp, 1881)

== Distribution ==
China, Japan, China, Indonesia, Taiwan.
