= Gymnophryxe theodori =

Scientific classification
- Kingdom: Animalia
- Phylum: Arthropoda
- Class: Insecta
- Order: Diptera
- Family: Tachinidae
- Subfamily: Exoristinae
- Tribe: Eryciini
- Genus: Gymnophryxe
- Species: G. theodori

Binomial name
- Gymnophryxe theodori (Kugler, 1968)

Synonyms
- Archiclops theodori Kugler, 1968

Species of fly

Gymnophryxe theodori is a Palaearctic species of tachinid flies in the genus Gymnophryxe of the family Tachinidae.

== Distribution ==
Palaearctic: China, Iran, Israel, Transcaucasia.
