= Hapalioloemus =

Scientific classification
- Kingdom: Animalia
- Phylum: Arthropoda
- Class: Insecta
- Order: Diptera
- Family: Tachinidae
- Subfamily: Exoristinae
- Tribe: Goniini
- Genus: Hapalioloemus; Baranov, 1934

Type species
- Hapalioloemus macheralis Baranov, 1934

Synonyms
- Boromyia Mesnil, 1957; Haplioloemus Shima, 1999; Hepalioloemus Baranov, 1934

Genus of flies

Hapalioloemus is a genus of flies in the family Tachinidae.

== Species ==
- Hapalioloemus gastrulus (Mesnil, 1957)
- Hapalioloemus macheralis Baranov, 1934
