= Myxexoristops =

Scientific classification
- Kingdom: Animalia
- Phylum: Arthropoda
- Class: Insecta
- Order: Diptera
- Family: Tachinidae
- Subfamily: Exoristinae
- Tribe: Goniini
- Genus: Myxexoristops; Townsend, 1911

Type species
- Mxexorista pexops Brauer & von Berganstamm, 1891

Genus of flies

Myxexoristops is a genus of flies in the family Tachinidae.

== Species ==
- Myxexoristops abietis Herting, 1964
- Myxexoristops arctica (Zetterstedt, 1838)
- Myxexoristops bicolor (Villeneuve, 1908)
- Myxexoristops blondeli (Robineau-Desvoidy, 1830)
- Myxexoristops bondsdorff (Zetterstedt, 1859)
- Myxexoristops fronto (Coquillett, 1897)
- Myxexoristops grandicornis Mesnil, 1957
- Myxexoristops hertingi Mesnil, 1955
- Myxexoristops neurotomae (Sellers, 1943)
- Myxexoristops stolida (Stein, 1924)
