= Euthelyconychia =

Scientific classification
- Kingdom: Animalia
- Phylum: Arthropoda
- Clade: Pancrustacea
- Class: Insecta
- Order: Diptera
- Family: Tachinidae
- Subfamily: Exoristinae
- Tribe: Blondeliini
- Genus: Euthelyconychia; Townsend, 1927

Type species
- Euthelyconychia clausa Townsend, 1927

Synonyms
- Aplomyiopsis Villeneuve, 1933; Synaplomyia Villeneuve, 1934

Genus of flies

Euthelyconychia is a genus of flies in the family Tachinidae.

== Species ==
- Euthelyconychia clausa Townsend, 1927
- Euthelyconychia galerucellae (Villeneuve, 1933)
- Euthelyconychia nana (Curran, 1929)
- Euthelyconychia vexans (Curran, 1925)
- Euthelyconychia xylota (Curran, 1927)
