= Acantholespesia comstocki =

Scientific classification
- Kingdom: Animalia
- Phylum: Arthropoda
- Class: Insecta
- Order: Diptera
- Family: Tachinidae
- Subfamily: Exoristinae
- Tribe: Eryciini
- Genus: Acantholespesia
- Species: A. comstocki

Binomial name
- Acantholespesia comstocki Williston, 1889

Synonyms
- Phorocera comstocki Williston, 1889

Species of fly

Acantholespesia comstocki is a species of bristle fly in the family Tachinidae. Its larval hosts are Hesperiidae, Megathymidae and Pyralidae families of butterflies.

== Distribution ==
United States.
