= Erycia =

Scientific classification
- Kingdom: Animalia
- Phylum: Arthropoda
- Class: Insecta
- Order: Diptera
- Family: Tachinidae
- Subfamily: Exoristinae
- Tribe: Eryciini
- Genus: Erycia; Robineau-Desvoidy, 1830

Type species
- Erycia grisea (= Tachina fatua Meigen, 1824) Robineau-Desvoidy, 1830

Synonyms
- Hemimasicera Brauer & von Bergenstamm, 1889

Genus of flies

Erycia is a genus of flies in the family Tachinidae.

== Species ==
- E. fasciata Villeneuve, 1924
- E. fatua (Meigen, 1824)
- E. festinans (Meigen, 1824)
- E. furibunda (Zetterstedt, 1844)
