= Madremyia =

Scientific classification
- Kingdom: Animalia
- Phylum: Arthropoda
- Class: Insecta
- Order: Diptera
- Family: Tachinidae
- Subfamily: Exoristinae
- Tribe: Eryciini
- Genus: Madremyia; Townsend, 1916

Type species
- Madremyia parva Townsend, 1916

Genus of flies

Madremyia is a genus of flies in the family Tachinidae.

== Species ==
- Madremyia clausa (Villeneuve, 1937)
- Madremyia saundersii (Williston, 1889)
- Madremyia setinervis (Mesnil, 1968)
