= Lubutana =

Scientific classification
- Kingdom: Animalia
- Phylum: Arthropoda
- Class: Insecta
- Order: Diptera
- Family: Tachinidae
- Subfamily: Exoristinae
- Tribe: Eryciini
- Genus: Lubutana; Villeneuve, 1938

Type species
- Madremyia parva Villeneuve, 1938

Genus of flies

Lubutana is a genus of parasitic flies in the family Tachinidae.

== Species ==
- Lubutana divaricata Villeneuve, 1938
- Lubutana mayeri Mesnil, 1955
- Lubutana perplexa Mesnil, 1955
