= Cossidophaga =

Scientific classification
- Kingdom: Animalia
- Phylum: Arthropoda
- Class: Insecta
- Order: Diptera
- Family: Tachinidae
- Subfamily: Exoristinae
- Tribe: Eryciini
- Genus: Cossidophaga; Baranov, 1934

Type species
- Podomyia atkinsoni Aubertin, 1932

Genus of flies

Cossidophaga is a genus of bristle flies in the family Tachinidae.

== Species ==
- Cossidophaga atkinsoni (Aubertin, 1932)

== Distribution ==
Myanmar.
