= Cestonia =

Scientific classification
- Kingdom: Animalia
- Phylum: Arthropoda
- Class: Insecta
- Order: Diptera
- Family: Tachinidae
- Subfamily: Exoristinae
- Tribe: Eryciini
- Genus: Cestonia; Rondani, 1861

Type species
- Cestonia cineraria Rondani, 1861

Synonyms
- Parerynnia Brauer & von Berganstamm, 1889; Gestonia Richter, 1995

Genus of flies

Cestonia is a genus of flies in the family Tachinidae.

== Species ==
- Cestonia canariensis Villeneuve, 1936
- Cestonia cineraria Rondani, 1861
- Cestonia deserticola Richter, 2006
- Cestonia grisella Mesnil, 1963
- Cestonia harteni Zeegers, 2007
- Cestonia lupicolor Richter, 1974
- Cestonia rufipes Zeegers, 2007
- Cestonia rutilans Villeneuve, 1929
