= Myxexoristops bicolor =

Scientific classification
- Kingdom: Animalia
- Phylum: Arthropoda
- Class: Insecta
- Order: Diptera
- Family: Tachinidae
- Subfamily: Exoristinae
- Tribe: Goniini
- Genus: Myxexoristops
- Species: M. bicolor

Binomial name
- Myxexoristops bicolor (Villeneuve, 1908)

Synonyms
- Exorista bicolor Villeneuve, 1908

Species of fly

Myxexoristops bicolor is a species of bristle fly in the family Tachinidae.

== Distribution ==
Czech Republic, Poland, Italy, Serbia, China.
