= Isosturmia =

Scientific classification
- Kingdom: Animalia
- Phylum: Arthropoda
- Class: Insecta
- Order: Diptera
- Family: Tachinidae
- Subfamily: Exoristinae
- Tribe: Eryciini
- Genus: Isosturmia; Townsend, 1927

Type species
- Isosturmia inversa Townsend, 1927

Synonyms
- Epixorista Townsend, 1927; Leisiopsis Townsend, 1927; Leiosiopsis Townsend, 1927; Zygocarcelia Townsend, 1927

Genus of flies

Isosturmia is a genus of flies in the family Tachinidae.

== Species ==
- Isosturmia aureipollinosa (Chao & Zhou, 1992)
- Isosturmia chatterjeeana (Baranov, 1934)
- Isosturmia cruciata (Townsend, 1927)
- Isosturmia grandis Chao & Sun, 1993
- Isosturmia intermedia Townsend, 1927
- Isosturmia inversa Townsend, 1927
- Isosturmia japonica (Mesnil, 1957)
- Isosturmia picta (Baranov, 1932)
- Isosturmia pilosa Shima, 1987
- Isosturmia pruinosa Chao & Sun, 1992
- Isosturmia setamacula (Chao & Liang, 2002)
- Isosturmia setula (Liang & Chao, 1990)
- Isosturmia spinisurstyla Chao & Liang, 1998
