= Lasiopales =

Scientific classification
- Kingdom: Animalia
- Phylum: Arthropoda
- Class: Insecta
- Order: Diptera
- Family: Tachinidae
- Subfamily: Exoristinae
- Tribe: Eryciini
- Genus: Lasiopales; Villeneuve, 1922

Type species
- Ceratochaeta (Lasiopales) pachychaeta Villeneuve, 1922

Genus of flies

Lasiopales is a genus of flies in the family Tachinidae.

== Species ==
- Lasiopales pachychaeta (Villeneuve, 1922)

== Distribution ==
Turkmenistan, Uzbekistan, Algeria.
