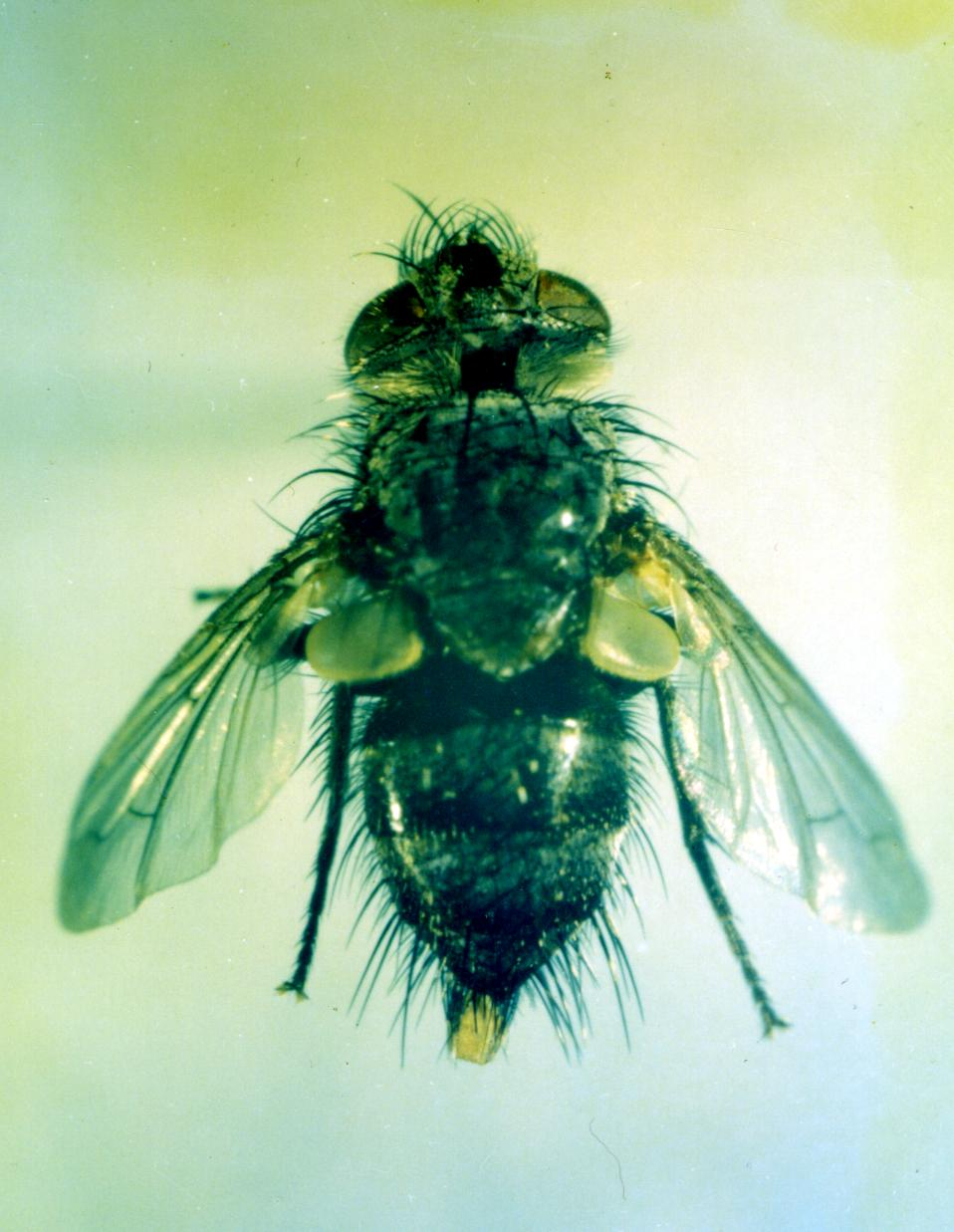
- Madremyia saundersii

Scientific classification
- Kingdom: Animalia
- Phylum: Arthropoda
- Class: Insecta
- Order: Diptera
- Family: Tachinidae
- Subfamily: Exoristinae
- Tribe: Eryciini
- Genus: Madremyia
- Species: M. saundersii

Binomial name
- Madremyia saundersii (Williston, 1889)

Synonyms
- Madremyia parva Townsend, 1916; Phorocera saundersii Williston, 1889

= Madremyia saundersii =

Species of fly

Madremyia saundersii is a species of bristle fly in the family Tachinidae. It is a parasitoid of late-instar Choristoneura species, emerging from the sixth instar or pupal stage of its host.

== Distribution ==
Canada, United States, Mexico.
