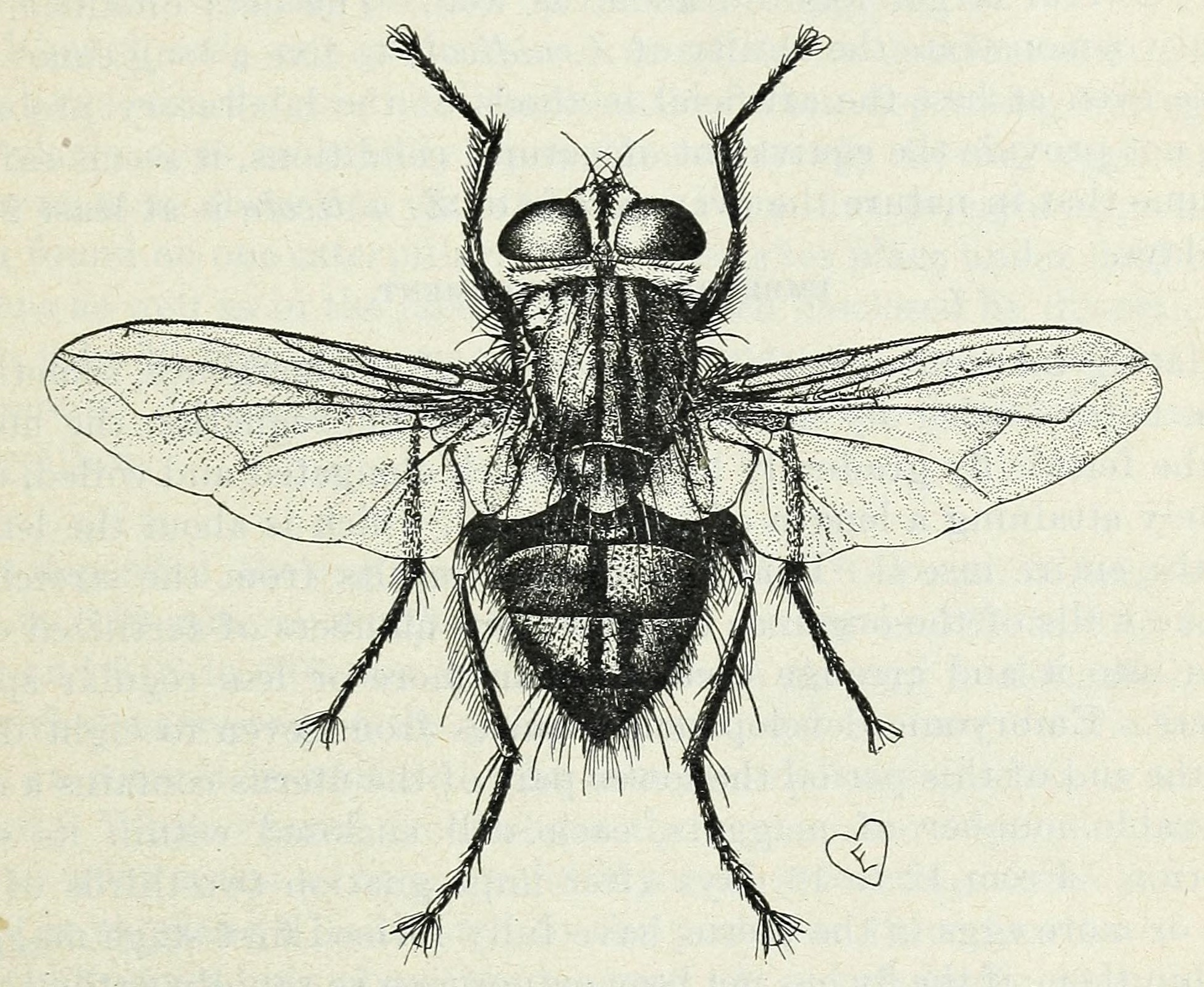
- Townsendiellomyia nidicola

Scientific classification
- Kingdom: Animalia
- Phylum: Arthropoda
- Class: Insecta
- Order: Diptera
- Family: Tachinidae
- Subfamily: Exoristinae
- Tribe: Eryciini
- Genus: Townsendiellomyia; Baranov, 1932

Type species
- Zygobothria nidicola Townsend, 1908

= Townsendiellomyia =

Genus of flies

Townsendiellomyia is a genus of flies in the family Tachinidae.

== Species ==
- Townsendiellomyia nidicola (Townsend, 1908)
