= Eugaedioxenis =

Scientific classification
- Kingdom: Animalia
- Phylum: Arthropoda
- Class: Insecta
- Order: Diptera
- Family: Tachinidae
- Subfamily: Exoristinae
- Tribe: Eryciini
- Genus: Eugaedioxenis; Cerretti, O’Hara & Stireman, 2015

Type species
- Gaedioxenis haematodes Villeneuve, 1937

Genus of flies

Eugaedioxenis is a genus of bristle flies in the family Tachinidae.

== Species ==
- Eugaedioxenis haematodes (Villeneuve, 1937)
- Eugaedioxenis horridus Cerretti, O’Hara & Stireman, 2015
