= Myothyriopsis picta =

Scientific classification
- Kingdom: Animalia
- Phylum: Arthropoda
- Class: Insecta
- Order: Diptera
- Family: Tachinidae
- Subfamily: Exoristinae
- Tribe: Eryciini
- Genus: Myothyriopsis
- Species: M. picta

Binomial name
- Myothyriopsis picta (Wulp, 1890)

Synonyms
- Masicera picta Wulp, 1890; Myothyriopsis bivittata Townsend, 1919

Species of fly

Myothyriopsis picta is a species of bristle fly in the family Tachinidae.

== Distribution ==
United States, Trinidad and Tobago, Mexico, Brazil.
