= Cavalieria =

Scientific classification
- Kingdom: Animalia
- Phylum: Arthropoda
- Class: Insecta
- Order: Diptera
- Family: Tachinidae
- Subfamily: Exoristinae
- Tribe: Eryciini
- Genus: Cavalieria; Villeneuve, 1908

Type species
- Cavalieria genibarbis Villeneuve, 1908

Genus of flies

Cavalieria is a genus of flies in the family Tachinidae.

== Species ==
- Cavalieria genibarbis Villeneuve, 1908

== Distribution ==
Greece, Italy, France, Russia, Azerbaijan.
