= Amelibaea =

Scientific classification
- Kingdom: Animalia
- Phylum: Arthropoda
- Class: Insecta
- Order: Diptera
- Family: Tachinidae
- Subfamily: Exoristinae
- Tribe: Eryciini
- Genus: Amelibaea; Mesnil, 1955

Type species
- Parexorista tultschensis Brauer & von Bergenstamm, 1891

Genus of flies

Amelibaea is a genus of flies in the family Tachinidae. The genus was originally created as a subgenus of Phebellia.

== Species ==
- Amelibaea tultschensis (Brauer & von Bergenstamm, 1891)

== Distribution ==
China, Czech Republic, Hungary, Romania, Slovakia, Bulgaria, Greece, Italy, France, Switzerland, Israel.
