= Cadurciella =

Scientific classification
- Kingdom: Animalia
- Phylum: Arthropoda
- Class: Insecta
- Order: Diptera
- Family: Tachinidae
- Subfamily: Exoristinae
- Tribe: Eryciini
- Genus: Cadurciella; Villeneuve, 1927

Type species
- Cadurciella rufipalpis Villeneuve, 1927

Genus of flies

Cadurciella is a genus of flies in the family Tachinidae.

== Species ==
- Cadurciella rufipalpis Villeneuve, 1927
- Cadurciella tritaeniata (Rondani, 1859)
- Cadurciella uniseta (Curran, 1933)
