= Heliodorus vexillifer =

Scientific classification
- Kingdom: Animalia
- Phylum: Arthropoda
- Class: Insecta
- Order: Diptera
- Family: Tachinidae
- Subfamily: Exoristinae
- Tribe: Eryciini
- Genus: Heliodorus
- Species: H. vexillifer

Binomial name
- Heliodorus vexillifer Reinhard, 1964

Species of fly

Heliodorus vexillifer is a Nearctic species of tachinid flies in the genus Heliodorus of the family Tachinidae.

== Distribution ==
Nearctic: United States.
