= Xylotachina diluta =

Scientific classification
- Kingdom: Animalia
- Phylum: Arthropoda
- Clade: Pancrustacea
- Class: Insecta
- Order: Diptera
- Family: Tachinidae
- Subfamily: Exoristinae
- Tribe: Eryciini
- Genus: Xylotachina
- Species: X. diluta

Binomial name
- Xylotachina diluta (Meigen, 1824)

Synonyms
- Tachina diluta Meigen, 1824; Masicera ambulans Rondani, 1861; Tachina scutellata Zetterstedt, 1838; Xylotachina ligniperdae Brauer & von Berganstamm, 1891

Species of fly

Xylotachina diluta is a European and Asian species of fly in the family Tachinidae.

== Distribution ==
British Isles, Czech Republic, Hungary, Poland, Slovakia, Ukraine, Denmark, Finland, Norway, Sweden, Bulgaria, Italy, Portugal, Spain, Austria, France, Germany, Switzerland, Russia, Transcaucasia, China.
