= Pimelimyia russata =

Scientific classification
- Kingdom: Animalia
- Phylum: Arthropoda
- Class: Insecta
- Order: Diptera
- Family: Tachinidae
- Subfamily: Exoristinae
- Tribe: Goniini
- Genus: Pimelimyia
- Species: P. russata

Binomial name
- Pimelimyia russata (Villeneuve, 1943)

Synonyms
- Sturima russata Villeneuve, 1943

Species of fly

Pimelimyia russata is a species of bristle fly in the family Tachinidae.

== Distribution ==
South Africa.
