= Rhinaplomyia =

Scientific classification
- Kingdom: Animalia
- Phylum: Arthropoda
- Class: Insecta
- Order: Diptera
- Family: Tachinidae
- Subfamily: Exoristinae
- Tribe: Eryciini
- Genus: Rhinaplomyia; Mesnil, 1955

Type species
- Carcelia nasuta Villeneuve, 1937

Genus of flies

Rhinaplomyia is a genus of flies in the family Tachinidae.

== Species ==
- Rhinaplomyia echinata Mesnil, 1957
- Rhinaplomyia emporomyioides (Townsend, 1933)
- Rhinaplomyia nasuta (Villeneuve, 1937)
