= Thelymyiops =

Scientific classification
- Kingdom: Animalia
- Phylum: Arthropoda
- Class: Insecta
- Order: Diptera
- Family: Tachinidae
- Subfamily: Exoristinae
- Tribe: Eryciini
- Genus: Thelymyiops; Mesnil, 1950

Type species
- Carcelia coniformis Villeneuve, 1941

Genus of flies

Thelymyiops is a genus of flies in the family Tachinidae.

== Species ==
- Thelymyiops coniformis (Villeneuve, 1941)

== Distribution ==
Congo, Ghana, Tanzania, Uganda.
