= Elodimyia =

Scientific classification
- Kingdom: Animalia
- Phylum: Arthropoda
- Class: Insecta
- Order: Diptera
- Family: Tachinidae
- Subfamily: Exoristinae
- Tribe: Eryciini
- Genus: Elodimyia; Mesnil, 1952

Type species
- Elodimyia tricincta Mesnil, 1952

Genus of flies

Elodimyia is a genus of parasitic flies in the family Tachinidae.

== Species ==
- Elodimyia tricincta Mesnil, 1952

== Distribution ==
Lesser Sunda Islands.
