= Chaetostigmoptera manca =

Scientific classification
- Kingdom: Animalia
- Phylum: Arthropoda
- Class: Insecta
- Order: Diptera
- Family: Tachinidae
- Tribe: Blondeliini
- Genus: Chaetostigmoptera
- Species: C. manca

Binomial name
- Chaetostigmoptera manca (Greene, 1934)

Synonyms
- Plectops manca Greene, 1934

Species of fly

Chaetostigmoptera manca is a species of bristle fly in the family Tachinidae.

== Distribution ==
United States.
