= Ptilocatagonia =

Scientific classification
- Kingdom: Animalia
- Phylum: Arthropoda
- Class: Insecta
- Order: Diptera
- Family: Tachinidae
- Subfamily: Exoristinae
- Tribe: Eryciini
- Genus: Ptilocatagonia; Mesnil, 1956

Type species
- Sisyropa (Ptilocatagonia) viridescens Mesnil, 1956

Genus of flies

Ptilocatagonia is a genus of bristle flies in the family Tachinidae.

== Species ==
- Ptilocatagonia viridescens Mesnil, 1956

== Distribution ==
Sierra Leone, Tanzania, Zambia.
