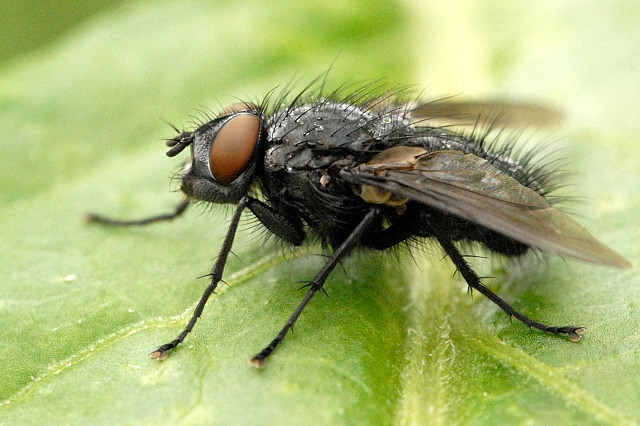
- Epicampocera succincta

Scientific classification
- Kingdom: Animalia
- Phylum: Arthropoda
- Class: Insecta
- Order: Diptera
- Family: Tachinidae
- Subfamily: Exoristinae
- Tribe: Eryciini
- Genus: Epicampocera; Macquart, 1849
- Species: E. succincta

Binomial name
- Epicampocera succincta (Meigen, 1824)

= Epicampocera =

Genus of flies

Epicampocera is a genus of flies in the family Tachinidae, found in Europe.

== Species ==
- Epicampocera succincta (Meigen, 1824)
