= Prospalaea =

Scientific classification
- Kingdom: Animalia
- Phylum: Arthropoda
- Class: Insecta
- Order: Diptera
- Family: Tachinidae
- Subfamily: Exoristinae
- Tribe: Eryciini
- Genus: Prospalaea; Aldrich, 1925

Type species
- Prosopaea insularis Brauer & von Bergenstamm, 1891

Genus of flies

Prospalaea is a genus of parasitic flies in the family Tachinidae.

== Species ==
- Prospalaea insularis (Brauer & von Bergenstamm, 1891)

== Distribution ==
Puerto Rico, Virgin Islands.
