= Heliodorus (fly) =

Scientific classification
- Kingdom: Animalia
- Phylum: Arthropoda
- Class: Insecta
- Order: Diptera
- Family: Tachinidae
- Subfamily: Exoristinae
- Tribe: Eryciini
- Genus: Heliodorus; Reinhard, 1964

Type species
- Heliodorus vexillifer Reinhard, 1964

Genus of flies

Heliodorus is a genus of flies in the family Tachinidae.

== Species ==
- Heliodorus cochisensis Reinhard, 1964
- Heliodorus vexillifer Reinhard, 1964

== Distribution ==
United States.
