= Tlephusa =

Scientific classification
- Kingdom: Animalia
- Phylum: Arthropoda
- Clade: Pancrustacea
- Class: Insecta
- Order: Diptera
- Family: Tachinidae
- Subfamily: Exoristinae
- Tribe: Eryciini
- Genus: Tlephusa; Robineau-Desvoidy, 1863

Type species
- Tlephusa aurifrons Robineau-Desvoidy, 1863

Genus of flies

Tlephusa is a genus of flies in the family Tachinidae.

== Species ==
- Tlephusa cincinna (Rondani, 1859)

== Distribution ==
British Isles, Czech Republic, Estonia, Hungary, Romania, Slovakia, Ukraine, Denmark, Finland, Norway, Sweden, Bulgaria, Italy, Spain, Austria, France, Germany, Netherlands, Switzerland, Russia, Transcaucasia, China.
