= Chaetosisyrops =

Scientific classification
- Kingdom: Animalia
- Phylum: Arthropoda
- Class: Insecta
- Order: Diptera
- Family: Tachinidae
- Subfamily: Exoristinae
- Tribe: Eryciini
- Genus: Chaetosisyrops; Townsend, 1912

Type species
- Chaetosisyrops montanus Townsend, 1912

Genus of flies

Chaetosisyrops is a genus of bristle flies in the family Tachinidae.

== Species ==
- Chaetosisyrops montanus Townsend, 1912

== Distribution ==
Peru.
