= Etroga =

Scientific classification
- Kingdom: Animalia
- Phylum: Arthropoda
- Class: Insecta
- Order: Diptera
- Family: Tachinidae
- Subfamily: Exoristinae
- Tribe: Eryciini
- Genus: Etroga; Richter, 1995

Type species
- Etroga efetovi Richter, 1995

Genus of flies

Etroga is a genus of bristle flies in the family Tachinidae.

== Species ==
- Etroga efetovi Richter, 1995

== Distribution ==
Turkmenistan.
