= Glaurocarini =

Scientific classification
- Kingdom: Animalia
- Phylum: Arthropoda
- Class: Insecta
- Order: Diptera
- Family: Tachinidae
- Subfamily: Tachininae
- Tribe: Glaurocarini

Tribe of flies

Glaurocarini is a tribe of flies in the family Tachinidae.

== Genera ==
- Glaurocara Thomson, 1869
- Semisuturia Malloch, 1927
