= Euthelyconychia clausa =

Scientific classification
- Kingdom: Animalia
- Phylum: Arthropoda
- Class: Insecta
- Order: Diptera
- Family: Tachinidae
- Subfamily: Exoristinae
- Tribe: Blondeliini
- Genus: Euthelyconychia
- Species: E. clausa

Binomial name
- Euthelyconychia clausa Townsend, 1927

Species of fly

Euthelyconychia clausa is a species of fly in the family Tachinidae.

== Distribution ==
Brazil.
