= Asseclamyia =

Scientific classification
- Kingdom: Animalia
- Phylum: Arthropoda
- Class: Insecta
- Order: Diptera
- Family: Tachinidae
- Subfamily: Exoristinae
- Tribe: Eryciini
- Genus: Asseclamyia; Reinhard, 1956

Type species
- Asseclamyia sphenofrons Reinhard, 1956

Genus of flies

Asseclamyia is a genus of flies in the family Tachinidae.

== Species ==
- Asseclamyia sphenofrons Reinhard, 1956

== Distribution ==
United States.
