= Topomeigenia =

Scientific classification
- Kingdom: Animalia
- Phylum: Arthropoda
- Class: Insecta
- Order: Diptera
- Family: Tachinidae
- Subfamily: Exoristinae
- Tribe: Eryciini
- Genus: Topomeigenia; Townsend, 1919

Type species
- Topomeigenia maturina Townsend, 1919

Synonyms
- Gymnosturmia Townsend, 1927

Genus of flies

Topomeigenia is a genus of flies in the family Tachinidae.

== Species ==
- Topomeigenia andina (Townsend, 1929)
- Topomeigenia grisea (Townsend, 1927)
- Topomeigenia maturina Townsend, 1919
