= Wardarina =

Scientific classification
- Kingdom: Animalia
- Phylum: Arthropoda
- Class: Insecta
- Order: Diptera
- Family: Tachinidae
- Subfamily: Exoristinae
- Tribe: Eryciini
- Genus: Wardarina; Mesnil, 1956

Type species
- Wardarina melancholica Mesnil, 1956

Synonyms
- Wardarina Mesnil, 1953

Genus of flies

Wardarina is a genus of flies in the family Tachinidae.

== Species ==
- Wardarina kugleri Herting, 1986
- Wardarina melancholica (Mesnil, 1956)
