= Myxexoristops abietis =

Scientific classification
- Kingdom: Animalia
- Phylum: Arthropoda
- Class: Insecta
- Order: Diptera
- Family: Tachinidae
- Subfamily: Exoristinae
- Tribe: Goniini
- Genus: Myxexoristops
- Species: M. abietis

Binomial name
- Myxexoristops abietis Herting, 1964

Species of fly

Myxexoristops abietis is a species of bristle fly in the family Tachinidae.

== Distribution ==
Czech Republic, Poland, Denmark, Finland, Sweden, Italy, Austria, Germany, Netherlands, Switzerland, China.
