= Myxexoristops arctica =

Scientific classification
- Kingdom: Animalia
- Phylum: Arthropoda
- Class: Insecta
- Order: Diptera
- Family: Tachinidae
- Subfamily: Exoristinae
- Tribe: Goniini
- Genus: Myxexoristops
- Species: M. arctica

Binomial name
- Myxexoristops arctica (Zetterstedt, 1838)

Synonyms
- Tachina arctica Zetterstedt, 1838

Species of fly

Myxexoristops arctica is a species of bristle fly in the family Tachinidae.

== Distribution ==
Finland, Norway, Sweden, China.
