= Bactromyiella =

Scientific classification
- Kingdom: Animalia
- Phylum: Arthropoda
- Class: Insecta
- Order: Diptera
- Family: Tachinidae
- Subfamily: Exoristinae
- Tribe: Eryciini
- Genus: Bactromyiella; Mesnil, 1952

Type species
- Masicera ficta Walker, 1861

Genus of flies

Bactromyiella is a genus of bristle flies in the family Tachinidae.

== Species ==
- Bactromyiella ficta (Walker, 1861)
