= Carcelina =

Scientific classification
- Kingdom: Animalia
- Phylum: Arthropoda
- Class: Insecta
- Order: Diptera
- Family: Tachinidae
- Subfamily: Exoristinae
- Tribe: Eryciini
- Genus: Carcelina; Mesnil, 1944

Type species
- Carcelia (Carcelina) nigrapex Mesnil, 1944

Genus of flies

Carcelina is a genus of flies in the family Tachinidae.

== Species ==
- Carcelina clavipalpis (Chao & Liang, 1986)
- Carcelina latifacialia (Chao & Liang, 1986)
- Carcelina nigrapex (Mesnil, 1944)
- Carcelina pallidipes (Uéda, 1960)
- Carcelina shangfangshanica (Chao & Liang, 2002)
- Carcelina unisetosa (Shima, 1969)
