= Paradrino =

Scientific classification
- Kingdom: Animalia
- Phylum: Arthropoda
- Class: Insecta
- Order: Diptera
- Family: Tachinidae
- Subfamily: Exoristinae
- Tribe: Eryciini
- Genus: Paradrino; Mesnil, 1949

Type species
- Sturmia halli Curran, 1939

Genus of flies

Paradrino is a genus of flies in the family Tachinidae.

== Species ==
- Paradrino assimilis Shima, 1984
- Paradrino atrisetosa Shima, 1984
- Paradrino dasyops (Mesnil, 1968)
- Paradrino fijiana Shima, 1984
- Paradrino halli (Curran, 1939)
- Paradrino laevicula (Mesnil, 1951)
- Paradrino laxifrons Shima, 1984
- Paradrino longicornis Shima, 1984
- Paradrino pilifacies Lahiri, 2006
- Paradrino solitaris Thompson, 1966
