= Diaprochaeta =

Scientific classification
- Kingdom: Animalia
- Phylum: Arthropoda
- Class: Insecta
- Order: Diptera
- Family: Tachinidae
- Subfamily: Exoristinae
- Tribe: Eryciini
- Genus: Diaprochaeta; Mesnil, 1970

Type species
- Diaprochaeta illustris Mesnil, 1970

Genus of flies

Diaprochaeta is a genus of bristle flies in the family Tachinidae.

== Species ==
- Diaprochaeta illustris Mesnil, 1970

== Distribution ==
Zimbabwe.
