= Rcortesia =

Scientific classification
- Kingdom: Animalia
- Phylum: Arthropoda
- Class: Insecta
- Order: Diptera
- Family: Tachinidae
- Subfamily: Exoristinae
- Tribe: Eryciini
- Genus: Rcortesia; Koçak & Kemal, 2010

Type species
- Hypsomyia hispida Cortés, 1983

Synonyms
- Hypsomyia Cortés, 1983

Genus of flies

Rcortesia is a genus of flies in the family Tachinidae.

== Species ==
Rcortesia hispida (Cortés, 1983)

== Distribution ==
Chile.
