= Myothyriopsis =

Scientific classification
- Kingdom: Animalia
- Phylum: Arthropoda
- Class: Insecta
- Order: Diptera
- Family: Tachinidae
- Subfamily: Exoristinae
- Tribe: Eryciini
- Genus: Myothyriopsis; Townsend, 1919

Type species
- Myothyriopsis bivittata Townsend, 1919

Genus of flies

Myothyriopsis is a genus of parasitic flies in the family Tachinidae.

== Species ==
- Myothyriopsis picta (Wulp, 1890)

== Distribution ==
United States, Trinidad and Tobago, Mexico, Brazil.
