= Stylocarcelia =

Scientific classification
- Kingdom: Animalia
- Phylum: Arthropoda
- Class: Insecta
- Order: Diptera
- Family: Tachinidae
- Subfamily: Exoristinae
- Tribe: Eryciini
- Genus: Stylocarcelia; Zeegers, 2007

Type species
- Stylocarcelia stylata Zeegers, 2007

Genus of flies

Stylocarcelia is a genus of flies in the family Tachinidae.

== Species ==
- Stylocarcelia stylata Zeegers, 2007

== Distribution ==
Yemen.
