= Carceliodoria =

Scientific classification
- Kingdom: Animalia
- Phylum: Arthropoda
- Class: Insecta
- Order: Diptera
- Family: Tachinidae
- Subfamily: Exoristinae
- Tribe: Eryciini
- Genus: Carceliodoria; Townsend, 1928

Type species
- Carceliodoria palpalis Townsend, 1928

Genus of flies

Carceliodoria is a genus of flies in the family Tachinidae.

== Species ==
- Carceliodoria palpalis Townsend, 1928

== Distribution ==
Peru.
