= Carcelimyia =

Scientific classification
- Kingdom: Animalia
- Phylum: Arthropoda
- Clade: Pancrustacea
- Class: Insecta
- Order: Diptera
- Family: Tachinidae
- Subfamily: Exoristinae
- Tribe: Eryciini
- Genus: Carcelimyia; Mesnil, 1944

Type species
- Exorista dispar Macquart, 1851

Genus of flies

Carcelimyia is a genus of flies in the family Tachinidae.

== Species ==
- Carcelimyia dispar (Macquart, 1851)

== Distribution ==
Australia.
