= Aplomyopsis =

Scientific classification
- Kingdom: Animalia
- Phylum: Arthropoda
- Class: Insecta
- Order: Diptera
- Family: Tachinidae
- Subfamily: Exoristinae
- Tribe: Eryciini
- Genus: Aplomyopsis; Townsend, 1927

Type species
- Aplomyopsis brasiliensis Townsend, 1927

Genus of flies

Aplomyopsis is a genus of flies in the family Tachinidae.

== Species ==
- Aplomyopsis brasiliensis Townsend, 1927
- Aplomyopsis polita (Coquillett, 1897)
