= Telonotomyia =

Scientific classification
- Kingdom: Animalia
- Phylum: Arthropoda
- Class: Insecta
- Order: Diptera
- Family: Tachinidae
- Subfamily: Exoristinae
- Tribe: Eryciini
- Genus: Telonotomyia; Cortés, 1986

Type species
- Telonotomyia remota Cortés, 1986

Genus of flies

Telonotomyia is a genus of flies in the family Tachinidae.

== Species ==
- Telonotomyia remota Cortés, 1986

== Distribution ==
Chile.
