= Setalunula =

Scientific classification
- Kingdom: Animalia
- Phylum: Arthropoda
- Class: Insecta
- Order: Diptera
- Family: Tachinidae
- Subfamily: Exoristinae
- Tribe: Eryciini
- Genus: Setalunula; Chao & Yang, 1990

Type species
- Setalunula blepharipoides Chao & Yang, 1990

Genus of flies

Setalunula is a genus of flies in the family Tachinidae.

== Species ==
- Setalunula blepharipoides Chao & Yang, 1990
- Setalunula japonica Shima & Tachi, 2009
