= Antistasea =

Scientific classification
- Kingdom: Animalia
- Phylum: Arthropoda
- Class: Insecta
- Order: Diptera
- Family: Tachinidae
- Subfamily: Exoristinae
- Tribe: Eryciini
- Genus: Antistasea; Bischof, 1904

Type species
- Antistasea fimbriata Bischof, 1904

Genus of flies

Antistasea is a genus of bristle flies in the family Tachinidae.

== Species ==
- Antistasea fimbriata Bischof, 1904
- Antistasea mutans Mesnil, 1970
