= Chrysosturmia =

Scientific classification
- Kingdom: Animalia
- Phylum: Arthropoda
- Class: Insecta
- Order: Diptera
- Family: Tachinidae
- Subfamily: Exoristinae
- Tribe: Eryciini
- Genus: Chrysosturmia; Townsend, 1916

Type species
- Chrysosturmia orbitalis Townsend, 1916

Synonyms
- Chryssosturmia Townsend, 1927

Genus of flies

Chrysosturmia is a genus of bristle flies in the family Tachinidae.

== Species ==
- Chrysosturmia orbitalis Townsend, 1916

== Distribution ==
Brazil.
