= Phorocerostoma =

Scientific classification
- Kingdom: Animalia
- Phylum: Arthropoda
- Clade: Pancrustacea
- Class: Insecta
- Order: Diptera
- Family: Tachinidae
- Subfamily: Exoristinae
- Tribe: Eryciini
- Genus: Phorocerostoma; Malloch, 1930

Type species
- Phorocerosoma setiventris Malloch, 1929

Synonyms
- Phorocerosoma Malloch, 1929

Genus of flies

Phorocerostoma is a genus of flies in the family Tachinidae.

== Species ==
- Phorocerostoma setiventris (Malloch, 1929)
