= Nealsomyia =

Scientific classification
- Kingdom: Animalia
- Phylum: Arthropoda
- Class: Insecta
- Order: Diptera
- Family: Tachinidae
- Subfamily: Exoristinae
- Tribe: Goniini
- Genus: Nealsomyia; Mesnil, 1939

Type species
- Exorista triseriella Villeneuve, 1929

Genus of flies

Nealsomyia is a genus of flies in the family Tachinidae.

== Species ==
- Nealsomyia chloronitens (Mesnil, 1977)
- Nealsomyia clausa (Curran, 1940)
- Nealsomyia lindneri Mesnil, 1959
- Nealsomyia merzi Cerretti, 2005
- Nealsomyia rufella (Bezzi, 1925)
- Nealsomyia rufipes (Villeneuve, 1937)
- Nealsomyia triseriella (Villeneuve, 1929)
