= Eunemorilla =

Scientific classification
- Kingdom: Animalia
- Phylum: Arthropoda
- Class: Insecta
- Order: Diptera
- Family: Tachinidae
- Subfamily: Exoristinae
- Tribe: Eryciini
- Genus: Eunemorilla; Townsend, 1919

Type species
- Eunemorilla peruviana Townsend, 1919

Synonyms
- Masiphyomyia Reinhard, 1944; Mimologus Reinhard, 1955

Genus of flies

Eunemorilla is a genus of flies in the family Tachinidae erected by Charles Henry Tyler Townsend in 1919.

== Species ==
- Eunemorilla albifrons (Walker, 1836)
- Eunemorilla alearis (Reinhard, 1944)
- Eunemorilla comosa (Reinhard, 1944)
- Eunemorilla effeta (Reinhard, 1955)
- Eunemorilla emulatus (Reinhard, 1962)
- Eunemorilla longicornis (Reinhard, 1944)
- Eunemorilla paralis (Reinhard, 1944)
- Eunemorilla peruviana Townsend, 1919
