= Acantholespesia =

Scientific classification
- Kingdom: Animalia
- Phylum: Arthropoda
- Class: Insecta
- Order: Diptera
- Family: Tachinidae
- Subfamily: Exoristinae
- Tribe: Eryciini
- Genus: Acantholespesia; Wood, 1987

Type species
- Phorocera comstocki Williston, 1889

Genus of flies

Acantholespesia is a genus of flies in the family Tachinidae.

== Species ==
- Acantholespesia comstocki (Williston, 1889)
- Acantholespesia signata (Aldrich & Webber, 1924)
- Acantholespesia texana (Aldrich & Webber, 1924)
