= Thelymyia =

Scientific classification
- Kingdom: Animalia
- Phylum: Arthropoda
- Class: Insecta
- Order: Diptera
- Family: Tachinidae
- Subfamily: Exoristinae
- Tribe: Eryciini
- Genus: Thelymyia; Brauer & von Berganstamm, 1891

Type species
- Thelymyia loewii Brauer & von Berganstamm, 1891

Genus of flies

Thelymyia is a genus of flies in the family Tachinidae.

== Species ==
- Thelymyia saltuum (Meigen, 1824)

== Distribution ==
China, Czech Republic, Lithuania, Poland, Ukraine, Denmark, Sweden, Austria, Belgium, France, Germany, Netherlands, Mongolia, Russia.
