= Argyrochaetona =

Scientific classification
- Kingdom: Animalia
- Phylum: Arthropoda
- Class: Insecta
- Order: Diptera
- Family: Tachinidae
- Subfamily: Exoristinae
- Tribe: Eryciini
- Genus: Argyrochaetona; Townsend, 1919

Type species
- Argyrochaetona cubana Townsend, 1919

Genus of flies

Argyrochaetona is a genus of bristle flies in the family Tachinidae.

== Species ==
- Argyrochaetona cubana Townsend, 1919
- Argyrochaetona peruana Townsend, 1928
