= Chrysometopiops =

Scientific classification
- Kingdom: Animalia
- Phylum: Arthropoda
- Class: Insecta
- Order: Diptera
- Family: Tachinidae
- Subfamily: Exoristinae
- Tribe: Eryciini
- Genus: Chrysometopiops; Townsend, 1916

Type species
- Chrysometopiops smithii Townsend, 1916

Genus of flies

Chrysometopiops is a genus of bristle flies in the family Tachinidae.

== Species ==
- Chrysometopiops smithii Townsend, 1916

== Distribution ==
Brazil.
