= Argyrothelaira =

Scientific classification
- Kingdom: Animalia
- Phylum: Arthropoda
- Class: Insecta
- Order: Diptera
- Family: Tachinidae
- Subfamily: Exoristinae
- Tribe: Eryciini
- Genus: Argyrothelaira; Townsend, 1916

Type species
- Argyrothelaira froggattii Townsend, 1916

Genus of flies

Argyrothelaira is a genus of flies in the family Tachinidae.

== Species ==
- Argyrothelaira froggattii Townsend, 1916
- Argyrothelaira melancholica (Mesnil, 1944)
