= Iconofrontina =

Scientific classification
- Kingdom: Animalia
- Phylum: Arthropoda
- Class: Insecta
- Order: Diptera
- Family: Tachinidae
- Subfamily: Exoristinae
- Tribe: Eryciini
- Genus: Iconofrontina; Townsend, 1931

Type species
- Iconofrontina minthoidea Townsend, 1931

Genus of flies

Hypersara is a genus of parasitic flies in the family Tachinidae.

== Species ==
- Iconofrontina minthoidea Townsend, 1931

== Distribution ==
Argentina.
