= Neomedina =

Scientific classification
- Kingdom: Animalia
- Phylum: Arthropoda
- Class: Insecta
- Order: Diptera
- Family: Tachinidae
- Subfamily: Exoristinae
- Tribe: Eryciini
- Genus: Neomedina; Malloch, 1935

Type species
- Neomedina atripennis Malloch, 1935

Genus of flies

Neomedina is a genus of parasitic flies in the family Tachinidae.

== Species ==
- Neomedina atripennis Malloch, 1935

== Distribution ==
Samoa.
