= Phebellia =

Scientific classification
- Kingdom: Animalia
- Phylum: Arthropoda
- Class: Insecta
- Order: Diptera
- Family: Tachinidae
- Subfamily: Exoristinae
- Tribe: Eryciini
- Genus: Phebellia; Robineau-Desvoidy, 1846

Type species
- Phebellia aestivalis Robineau-Desvoidy, 1846 (=Tachina villica Zetterstedt, 1838)

Synonyms
- Phebellia Robineau-Desvoidy, 1845; Melibaea Robineau-Desvoidy, 1848; Aetylia Robineau-Desvoidy, 1863; Macropalpus Meunier, 1892; Asironia Mesnil, 1955

Genus of flies

Phebellia is a genus of flies in the family Tachinidae.

== Species ==
- Phebellia agnatella Mesnil, 1955
- Phebellia aurifrons Chao & Chen, 2007
- Phebellia carceliaeformis (Villeneuve, 1937)
- Phebellia cerurae (Sellers, 1943)
- Phebellia clavellariae (Brauer & von Bergenstamm, 1891)
- Phebellia curriei (Coquillett, 1897)
- Phebellia epicydes (Walker, 1849)
- Phebellia erecta (Sellers, 1943)
- Phebellia flavescens Shima, 1981
- Phebellia fulvipollinis Chao & Chen, 2007
- Phebellia glauca (Meigen, 1824)
- Phebellia glaucoides Herting, 1961
- Phebellia glirina (Rondani, 1859)
- Phebellia helvina (Coquillett, 1897)
- Phebellia imitator (Sellers, 1943)
- Phebellia laxifrons Shima, 1981
- Phebellia margaretae Bergstrӧm, 2005
- Phebellia nigricauda Mesnil, 1963
- Phebellia nudicosta Shima, 1981
- Phebellia pauciseta (Villeneuve, 1908)
- Phebellia pheosiae (Sellers, 1943)
- Phebellia setocoxa Chao & Chen, 2007
- Phebellia trichiosomae (Sellers, 1943)
- Phebellia triseta (Pandellé, 1896)
- Phebellia turanica Mesnil, 1963
- Phebellia vicina (Wainwright, 1940)
- Phebellia villica (Zetterstedt, 1838)
