= Tryphera =

Scientific classification
- Kingdom: Animalia
- Phylum: Arthropoda
- Class: Insecta
- Order: Diptera
- Family: Tachinidae
- Subfamily: Exoristinae
- Tribe: Eryciini
- Genus: Tryphera; Meigen, 1838

Type species
- Tachina lugubris Meigen, 1824

Synonyms
- Bonannia Rondani, 1861; Triphera Rondani, 1861

Genus of flies

Tryphera is a genus of flies in the family Tachinidae.

== Species ==
- Tryphera lugubris (Meigen, 1824)

== Distribution ==
Poland, Romania, Ukraine, Denmark, Bulgaria, Greece, Italy, Portugal, Serbia, Spain, Austria, France, Germany, Switzerland, Mongolia, Morocco, Russia, Azerbaijan.
