= Chryserycia =

Scientific classification
- Kingdom: Animalia
- Phylum: Arthropoda
- Class: Insecta
- Order: Diptera
- Family: Tachinidae
- Subfamily: Exoristinae
- Tribe: Eryciini
- Genus: Chryserycia; Mesnil, 1977

Type species
- Chryserycia fulviceps Mesnil, 1977

Genus of flies

Chryserycia is a genus of flies in the family Tachinidae.

== Species ==
- Chryserycia fulviceps Mesnil, 1977

== Distribution ==
Madagascar.
