= Amazohoughia =

Scientific classification
- Kingdom: Animalia
- Phylum: Arthropoda
- Class: Insecta
- Order: Diptera
- Family: Tachinidae
- Subfamily: Exoristinae
- Tribe: Eryciini
- Genus: Amazohoughia; Townsend, 1934

Type species
- Amazohoughia argentifrons Townsend, 1934

Genus of flies

Amazohoughia is a genus of flies in the family Tachinidae.

== Species ==
- Amazohoughia argentifrons Townsend, 1934
- Amazohoughia flavipes Thompson, 1964
