= Ptesiomyia =

Scientific classification
- Kingdom: Animalia
- Phylum: Arthropoda
- Class: Insecta
- Order: Diptera
- Family: Tachinidae
- Subfamily: Exoristinae
- Tribe: Eryciini
- Genus: Ptesiomyia; Brauer & von Bergenstamm, 1893

Type species
- Ptesiomyia microstoma Brauer & von Bergenstamm, 1893

Synonyms
- Philea Robineau-Desvoidy, 1863

Genus of flies

Prometopiops is a genus of parasitic flies in the family Tachinidae.

== Species ==
- Ptesiomyia alacris (Meigen, 1824)
- Ptesiomyia longicornis Kugler, 1980
- Ptesiomyia microstoma Brauer & von Bergenstamm, 1893
