= Catagonia =

Scientific classification
- Kingdom: Animalia
- Phylum: Arthropoda
- Class: Insecta
- Order: Diptera
- Family: Tachinidae
- Subfamily: Exoristinae
- Tribe: Eryciini
- Genus: Catagonia; Brauer & von Bergenstamm, 1891

Type species
- Exorista aberrans Rondani, 1859

Genus of flies

Catagonia is a genus of flies in the family Tachinidae.

== Species ==
- Catagonia aberrans (Rondani, 1859)

== Distribution ==
Czech Republic, Hungary, Latvia, Romania, Slovakia, Ukraine, Bosnia & Herzegovina, Bulgaria, Croatia, Greece, Italy, Serbia, Slovenia, Austria, Belgium, France, Germany, Netherlands, Switzerland, Japan, China.
