= Semisuturia =

Scientific classification
- Kingdom: Animalia
- Phylum: Arthropoda
- Clade: Pancrustacea
- Class: Insecta
- Order: Diptera
- Family: Tachinidae
- Subfamily: Tachininae
- Tribe: Glaurocarini
- Genus: Semisuturia; Malloch, 1927

Type species
- Semisuturia australis Malloch, 1927

Synonyms
- Doddiana Curran, 1927; Currana Özdikmen, 2007

Genus of flies

Semisuturia sp. in Wedderburn VIC 3518, Australia.

Semisuturia is a genus of flies in the family Tachinidae.

== Species ==
- Semisuturia australis Malloch, 1927
- Semisuturia flavifrons (Malloch, 1930)
- Semisuturia inermis (Malloch, 1933)
- Semisuturia mellea (Wiedemann, 1824)
- Semisuturia moffatensis Inclán, O'Hara, Stireman & Cerretti, 2017
- Semisuturia pahangensis Malloch, 1927
- Semisuturia pallens (Curran, 1927)
- Semisuturia parviseta (Malloch, 1930)
- Semisuturia robusta (Wulp, 1881)
