= Myxexoristops bondsdorff =

Scientific classification
- Kingdom: Animalia
- Phylum: Arthropoda
- Class: Insecta
- Order: Diptera
- Family: Tachinidae
- Subfamily: Exoristinae
- Tribe: Goniini
- Genus: Myxexoristops
- Species: M. bondsdorff

Binomial name
- Myxexoristops bondsdorff (Zetterstedt, 1859)

Synonyms
- Tachina bondsdorff Zetterstedt, 1859

Species of fly

Myxexoristops bondsdorff is a species of bristle fly in the family Tachinidae.

== Distribution ==
Czech Republic, Lithuania, Poland, Slovakia, Finland, Sweden, Italy, Spain, Austria, France, Germany, Netherlands, Switzerland, Kazakhstan, Russia, China.
