= Phonomyia =

Scientific classification
- Kingdom: Animalia
- Phylum: Arthropoda
- Class: Insecta
- Order: Diptera
- Family: Tachinidae
- Subfamily: Exoristinae
- Tribe: Eryciini
- Genus: Phonomyia; Brauer & von Bergenstamm, 1893

Type species
- Phonomyia micronyx Brauer & von Bergenstamm, 1893 (=Phorocera aristata Rondani, 1861)

Genus of flies

Phonomyia is a genus of flies in the family Tachinidae.

== Species ==
- Phonomyia aristata (Rondani, 1861)
- Phonomyia atypica Mesnil, 1963
