= Nepocarcelia =

Scientific classification
- Kingdom: Animalia
- Phylum: Arthropoda
- Class: Insecta
- Order: Diptera
- Family: Tachinidae
- Subfamily: Exoristinae
- Tribe: Eryciini
- Genus: Nepocarcelia; Townsend, 1927

Type species
- Nepocarcelia fulva Townsend, 1927

Genus of flies

Nepocarcelia is a genus of flies in the family Tachinidae.

== Species ==
- Nepocarcelia fulva Townsend, 1927
- Nepocarcelia palustrae (Brèthes, 1908)
