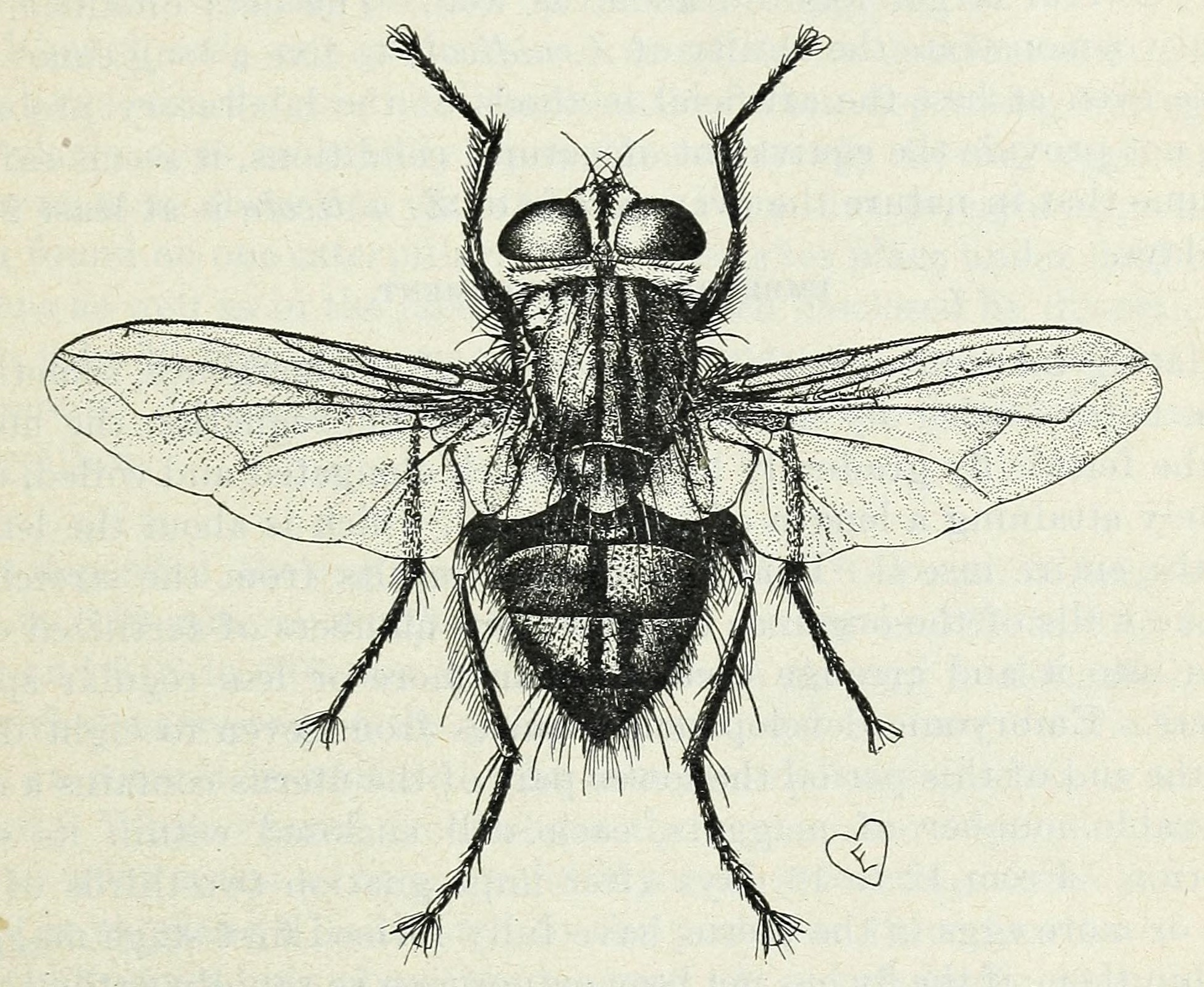

Scientific classification
- Kingdom: Animalia
- Phylum: Arthropoda
- Class: Insecta
- Order: Diptera
- Family: Tachinidae
- Genus: Townsendiellomyia
- Species: T. nidicola

Binomial name
- Townsendiellomyia nidicola Townsend, 1908

= Townsendiellomyia nidicola =

Species of fly

Townsendiellomyia nidicola is a species of bristle fly in the family Tachinidae.

== Distribution ==
Europe, Asia, introduced to New England.
