= Erycesta =

Scientific classification
- Kingdom: Animalia
- Phylum: Arthropoda
- Class: Insecta
- Order: Diptera
- Family: Tachinidae
- Subfamily: Exoristinae
- Tribe: Eryciini
- Genus: Erycesta; Herting, 1967

Type species
- Erycesta conica (= Masicera caudigera Rondani, 1861) Herting, 1967

Genus of flies

Erycesta is a genus of flies in the family Tachinidae.

== Species ==
- Erycesta caudigera Rondani, 1861
- Erycesta hertingi Richter, 1976
