= Catena serena =

Scientific classification
- Kingdom: Animalia
- Phylum: Arthropoda
- Class: Insecta
- Order: Diptera
- Family: Tachinidae
- Tribe: Eryciini
- Genus: Catena (Richter, 1975)
- Species: C. serena

Binomial name
- Catena serena (Richter, 1972)

Genus of flies

Catena is a monotypic genus of flies in the family Tachinidae. The only species in the genus is Catena serena. It can be found in Mongolia.
