= Casahuiria =

Scientific classification
- Kingdom: Animalia
- Phylum: Arthropoda
- Class: Insecta
- Order: Diptera
- Family: Tachinidae
- Subfamily: Exoristinae
- Tribe: Eryciini
- Genus: Casahuiria; Townsend, 1919

Type species
- Casahuiria cornuta Townsend, 1919

Genus of flies

Casahuiria is a genus of flies in the family Tachinidae.

== Species ==
- Casahuiria cornuta Townsend, 1919

== Distribution ==
Peru.
