= Heliconiophaga =

Scientific classification
- Kingdom: Animalia
- Phylum: Arthropoda
- Class: Insecta
- Order: Diptera
- Family: Tachinidae
- Subfamily: Exoristinae
- Tribe: Eryciini
- Genus: Heliconiophaga; Thompson, 1966

Type species
- Heliconiophaga cranei Thompson, 1966

Genus of flies

Heliconiophaga is a genus of parasitic flies in the family Tachinidae. It is mainly found in Trinidad and Tobago.

== Species ==
- Heliconiophaga cranei Thompson, 1966
