= Aprotheca =

Scientific classification
- Kingdom: Animalia
- Phylum: Arthropoda
- Class: Insecta
- Order: Diptera
- Family: Tachinidae
- Subfamily: Exoristinae
- Tribe: Eryciini
- Genus: Aprotheca; Macquart, 1851

Type species
- Aprotheca rufipes Macquart, 1851

Synonyms
- Parabrachelia Townsend, 1916

Genus of flies

Aprotheca is a genus of bristle flies in the family Tachinidae.

== Species ==
- Aprotheca basalis Macquart, 1851
- Aprotheca tenuisetosa (Macquart, 1847)
