= Stenosturmia =

Scientific classification
- Kingdom: Animalia
- Phylum: Arthropoda
- Class: Insecta
- Order: Diptera
- Family: Tachinidae
- Subfamily: Exoristinae
- Tribe: Eryciini
- Genus: Stenosturmia; Townsend, 1927

Type species
- Stenosturmia stricta Townsend, 1927

Genus of flies

Stenosturmia is a genus of flies in the family Tachinidae.

== Species ==
- Stenosturmia peruana Townsend, 1929
- Stenosturmia stricta Townsend, 1927
