= Austrophryno =

Scientific classification
- Kingdom: Animalia
- Phylum: Arthropoda
- Clade: Pancrustacea
- Class: Insecta
- Order: Diptera
- Family: Tachinidae
- Subfamily: Exoristinae
- Tribe: Eryciini
- Genus: Austrophryno; Townsend, 1916

Type species
- Austrophryno diversicolor Townsend, 1934

Synonyms
- Archimera Mesnil, 1954

Genus of flies

Austrophryno is a genus of flies in the family Tachinidae.

== Species ==
- Austrophryno diversicolor Townsend, 1916

== Distribution ==
Australia
