= Euhygia =

Scientific classification
- Kingdom: Animalia
- Phylum: Arthropoda
- Class: Insecta
- Order: Diptera
- Family: Tachinidae
- Subfamily: Exoristinae
- Tribe: Eryciini
- Genus: Euhygia; Mesnil, 1968

Type species
- Hygia (Hygia) robusta Mesnil, 1952

Synonyms
- Euhygia Mesnil, 1960

Genus of flies

Elodimyia is a genus of parasitic flies in the family Tachinidae.

== Species ==
- Euhygia brevicornis Mesnil, 1963
- Euhygia robusta Mesnil, 1952
