= Myxexoristops blondeli =

Scientific classification
- Kingdom: Animalia
- Phylum: Arthropoda
- Class: Insecta
- Order: Diptera
- Family: Tachinidae
- Subfamily: Exoristinae
- Tribe: Goniini
- Genus: Myxexoristops
- Species: M. blondeli

Binomial name
- Myxexoristops blondeli (Robineau-Desvoidy, 1830)

Synonyms
- Phryxe blondeli Robineau-Desvoidy, 1830; Megalochaeta brachystoma Brauer & von Berganstamm, 1891; Myxexorista pexops Brauer & von Berganstamm, 1891; Parexorista acrochaeta Brauer & von Berganstamm, 1891; Parexorista irregularis Brauer & von Berganstamm, 1891; Phryxe ignota Robineau-Desvoidy, 1863; Tachina petiolinervis Zetterstedt, 1859; Tachina porcula Zetterstedt, 1859; Zenillia oclusa Pandellé, 1895

Species of fly

Myxexoristops blondeli is a species of bristle fly in the family Tachinidae.

== Distribution ==
British Isles, Czech Republic, Hungary, Poland, Romania, Slovakia, Ukraine, Denmark, Bulgaria, Italy, Serbia, Austria, Belgium, France, Germany, Netherlands, Switzerland, Japan, Mongolia, Russia, China.
