= Tsugaea =

Scientific classification
- Kingdom: Animalia
- Phylum: Arthropoda
- Class: Insecta
- Order: Diptera
- Family: Tachinidae
- Subfamily: Exoristinae
- Tribe: Eryciini
- Genus: Tsugaea; Hall, 1939

Type species
- Tsugaea nox Hall, 1939

Genus of flies

Tsugaea is a genus of flies in the family Tachinidae.

== Species ==
- Tsugaea nox Hall, 1939

== Distribution ==
Canada, United States, Mexico.
