= Zygozenillia =

Scientific classification
- Kingdom: Animalia
- Phylum: Arthropoda
- Class: Insecta
- Order: Diptera
- Family: Tachinidae
- Subfamily: Exoristinae
- Tribe: Eryciini
- Genus: Zygozenillia; Townsend, 1927

Type species
- Zygozenillia plumbea Townsend, 1927

Genus of flies

Zygozenillia is a genus of flies in the family Tachinidae.

== Species ==
- Zygozenillia plumbea Townsend, 1927

== Distribution ==
The genus is known from Brazil.
