= Neolydella =

Scientific classification
- Kingdom: Animalia
- Phylum: Arthropoda
- Class: Insecta
- Order: Diptera
- Family: Tachinidae
- Subfamily: Exoristinae
- Tribe: Eryciini
- Genus: Neolydella; Mesnil, 1939

Type species
- Lydella (Neolydella) pruinosa Mesnil, 1939

Genus of flies

Neolydella is a genus of parasitic flies in the family Tachinidae.

== Species ==
- Neolydella pruinosa (Mesnil, 1939)

== Distribution ==
Madagascar.
