= Myxexoristops stolida =

Scientific classification
- Kingdom: Animalia
- Phylum: Arthropoda
- Class: Insecta
- Order: Diptera
- Family: Tachinidae
- Subfamily: Exoristinae
- Tribe: Goniini
- Genus: Myxexoristops
- Species: M. stolida

Binomial name
- Myxexoristops stolida (Stein, 1924)

Synonyms
- Exorista stolida Stein, 1924; Zenillia nox Hall, 1937

Species of fly

Myxexoristops stolida is a species of bristle fly in the family Tachinidae.

== Distribution ==
British Isles, Czech Republic, Estonia, Hungary, Poland, Romania, Slovakia, Finland, Norway, Sweden, Bulgaria, Italy, Austria, Belgium, Germany, Netherlands, Switzerland, Japan, Russia, China.
