= Eulobomyia =

Scientific classification
- Kingdom: Animalia
- Phylum: Arthropoda
- Class: Insecta
- Order: Diptera
- Family: Tachinidae
- Subfamily: Exoristinae
- Tribe: Eryciini
- Genus: Eulobomyia; Woodley & Arnaud, 2008

Type species
- Lobomyia neotropica Woodley & Arnaud, 2008

Synonyms
- Lobomyia Woodley & Arnaud, 2008

Genus of flies

Eulobomyia is a monotypic genus of flies in the family Tachinidae.

== Species ==
- Eulobomyia neotropica (Woodley & Arnaud, 2008)

== Distribution ==
Trinidad and Tobago, Costa Rica, Mexico, Brazil, Colombia.
