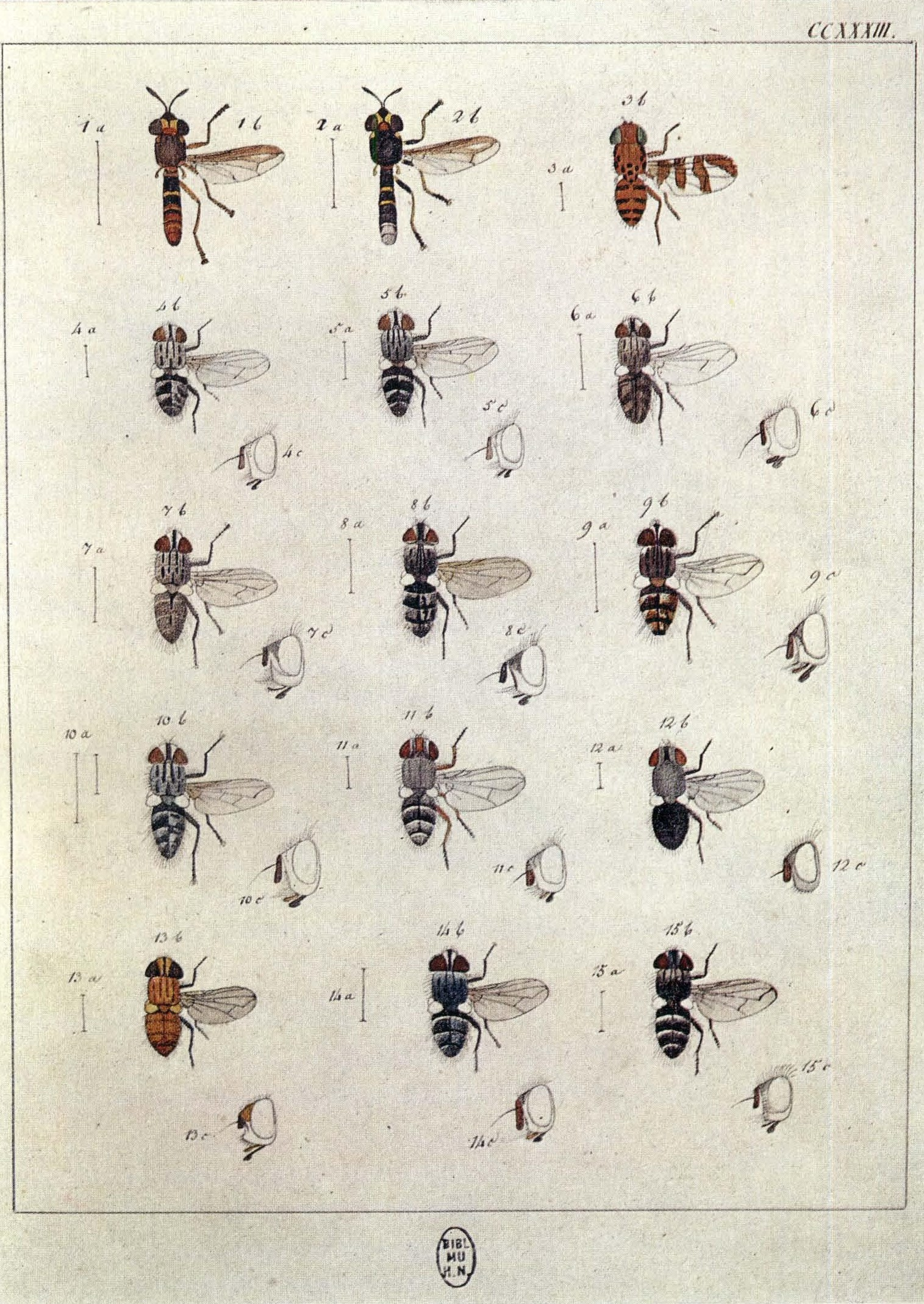
- Nilea hortulana figure 14

Scientific classification
- Kingdom: Animalia
- Phylum: Arthropoda
- Clade: Pancrustacea
- Class: Insecta
- Order: Diptera
- Family: Tachinidae
- Subfamily: Exoristinae
- Tribe: Eryciini
- Genus: Nilea; Robineau-Desvoidy, 1863

Type species
- Nilea innoxia Robineau-Desvoidy, 1863

Synonyms
- Phorcida Robineau-Desvoidy, 1863; Lylibaea Robineau-Desvoidy, 1863; Lyliboea Robineau-Desvoidy, 1863; Phyllophorocera Townsend, 1916; Eutritochaeta Townsend, 1919

= Nilea =

Genus of flies

Nilea is a genus of flies in the family Tachinidae.

== Species ==
- Nilea ambigua Bergström, 2007
- Nilea anatolica Mesnil, 1954
- Nilea aurea (Blanchard, 1942)
- Nilea breviunguis Liu, Chao & Li, 1999
- Nilea brigantina Herting, 1977
- Nilea carpocapsae (Townsend, 1919)
- Nilea dimmocki (Webber, 1930)
- Nilea erebiae (Mesnil, 1963)
- Nilea erecta (Coquillett, 1902)
- Nilea hortulana (Meigen, 1824)
- Nilea indica (Gardner, 1940)
- Nilea indistincta (Gardner, 1940)
- Nilea innoxia Robineau-Desvoidy, 1863
- Nilea insidiosa (Robineau-Desvoidy, 1863)
- Nilea lobeliae (Coquillett, 1897)
- Nilea longicauda (Mesnil, 1970)
- Nilea mathesoni (Reinhard, 1937)
- Nilea nestor (Curran, 1927)
- Nilea noctuiformis (Smith, 1915)
- Nilea palesioidea (Robineau-Desvoidy, 1830)
- Nilea perplexa Mesnil, 1977
- Nilea rufiscutellaris (Zetterstedt, 1859)
- Nilea sternalis (Coquillett, 1902)
- Nilea unipilum (Aldrich & Webber, 1924)
- Nilea valens (Aldrich & Webber, 1924)
