= Zizyphomyia =

Scientific classification
- Kingdom: Animalia
- Phylum: Arthropoda
- Clade: Pancrustacea
- Class: Insecta
- Order: Diptera
- Family: Tachinidae
- Subfamily: Exoristinae
- Tribe: Eryciini
- Genus: Zizyphomyia; Townsend, 1916

Type species
- Zizyphomyia limata Townsend, 1916

Synonyms
- Zigyphomyia Neave, 1940

Genus of flies

Zizyphomyia is a genus of flies in the family Tachinidae.

== Species ==
- Zizyphomyia angusta Reinhard, 1967
- Zizyphomyia chihuahuensis (Townsend, 1892)
- Zizyphomyia crescentis (Reinhard, 1944)
- Zizyphomyia limata (Coquillett, 1902)
