= Chetina =

Scientific classification
- Kingdom: Animalia
- Phylum: Arthropoda
- Class: Insecta
- Order: Diptera
- Family: Tachinidae
- Subfamily: Exoristinae
- Tribe: Eryciini
- Genus: Chetina; Rondani, 1856

Type species
- Chetina setigena Rondani, 1856

Synonyms
- Chetilia Rondani, 1859; Chetilya Rondani, 1861; Chetylia Rondani, 1861; Chetylya Rondani, 1861; Chaetolya Brauer & von Bergenstamm, 1889; Chaetina Bezzi & Stein, 1907

Genus of flies

Chetina is a genus of bristle flies in the family Tachinidae.

== Species ==
- Chetina longicauda Kugler, 1974
- Chetina setigena Rondani, 1856
