= Pseudosturmia =

Scientific classification
- Kingdom: Animalia
- Phylum: Arthropoda
- Class: Insecta
- Order: Diptera
- Family: Tachinidae
- Subfamily: Exoristinae
- Tribe: Eryciini
- Genus: Pseudosturmia; Thompson, 1966

Type species
- Pseudosturmia clavipalpis Thompson, 1966

Genus of flies

Pseudosturmia is a genus of parasitic flies in the family Tachinidae.

== Species ==
- Pseudosturmia clavipalpis Thompson, 1966
