= Xylotachina =

Scientific classification
- Kingdom: Animalia
- Phylum: Arthropoda
- Class: Insecta
- Order: Diptera
- Family: Tachinidae
- Subfamily: Exoristinae
- Tribe: Eryciini
- Genus: Xylotachina; Brauer & von Berganstamm, 1891

Type species
- Xylotachina ligniperdae Brauer & von Berganstamm, 1891

Genus of flies

Xylotachina is a genus of flies in the family Tachinidae.

== Species ==
- Xylotachina diluta (Meigen, 1824)
- Xylotachina vulnerans Mesnil, 1954
