= Siphosturmia =

Scientific classification
- Kingdom: Animalia
- Phylum: Arthropoda
- Class: Insecta
- Order: Diptera
- Family: Tachinidae
- Subfamily: Exoristinae
- Tribe: Eryciini
- Genus: Siphosturmia; Coquillett, 1897

Type species
- Argyrophylax rostrata Coquillett, 1895

Synonyms
- Microsillus Aldrich, 1926; Siphosturmiopis Neave, 1940; Siphosturmiopsis Townsend, 1915

Genus of flies

Siphosturmia is a genus of flies in the family Tachinidae.

== Species ==
- Siphosturmia baccharis (Reinhard, 1921)
- Siphosturmia confusa Reinhard, 1931
- Siphosturmia maltana Reinhard, 1951
- Siphosturmia melampyga (Reinhard, 1931)
- Siphosturmia melitaeae (Coquillett, 1897)
- Siphosturmia oteroensis (Reinhard, 1934)
- Siphosturmia phyciodis (Coquillett, 1897)
- Siphosturmia pollinosus Townsend, 1912
- Siphosturmia rafaeli Townsend, 1915
- Siphosturmia rostrata (Coquillett, 1895)
- Siphosturmia ruficauda (Thompson, 1963)
