= Thelairodrino =

Scientific classification
- Kingdom: Animalia
- Phylum: Arthropoda
- Class: Insecta
- Order: Diptera
- Family: Tachinidae
- Subfamily: Exoristinae
- Tribe: Eryciini
- Genus: Thelairodrino; Mesnil, 1954

Type species
- Thelairodrino gracilis Mesnil, 1954

Genus of flies

Thelairodrino is a genus of flies in the family Tachinidae.

== Species ==
- Thelairodrino anaphe (Curran, 1927)
- Thelairodrino cardinalis (Mesnil, 1949)
- Thelairodrino gracilis (Mesnil, 1952)
- Thelairodrino potina (Curran, 1927)
