= Montserratia =

Scientific classification
- Kingdom: Animalia
- Phylum: Arthropoda
- Class: Insecta
- Order: Diptera
- Family: Tachinidae
- Subfamily: Exoristinae
- Tribe: Eryciini
- Genus: Montserratia; Thompson, 1964

Type species
- Montserratia ovipara Thompson, 1964

Genus of flies

Metaphryno is a genus of parasitic flies in the family Tachinidae.

== Species ==
- Montserratia ovipara Thompson, 1964

== Distribution ==
Trinidad and Tobago.
