= Chlorogastropsis =

Scientific classification
- Kingdom: Animalia
- Phylum: Arthropoda
- Clade: Pancrustacea
- Class: Insecta
- Order: Diptera
- Family: Tachinidae
- Subfamily: Exoristinae
- Tribe: Eryciini
- Genus: Chlorogastropsis; Townsend, 1926

Type species
- Chlorogaster rufipes Schiner, 1868

Synonyms
- Eipogonoides Curran, 1938

Genus of flies

Chlorogastropsis is a monotypic genus of bristle flies in the family Tachinidae.

== Species ==
- Chlorogastropsis orga (Walker, 1849)

== Distribution ==
Australia.
