= Prooppia =

Scientific classification
- Kingdom: Animalia
- Phylum: Arthropoda
- Class: Insecta
- Order: Diptera
- Family: Tachinidae
- Subfamily: Exoristinae
- Tribe: Eryciini
- Genus: Prooppia; Townsend, 1926

Type species
- Hubneria nigripalpis Robineau-Desvoidy, 1830

Synonyms
- Oppia Robineau-Desvoidy, 1863; Proopia Mesnil, 1955

Genus of flies

Prooppia is a genus of parasitic flies in the family Tachinidae.

== Species ==
- Prooppia crassiseta (Aldrich & Webber, 1924)
- Prooppia latipalpis (Shima, 1981)
- Prooppia nigripalpis (Robineau-Desvoidy, 1848)
- Prooppia strigifrons (Zetterstedt, 1838)
- Prooppia stulta (Zetterstedt, 1844)
