= Botriopsis =

Scientific classification
- Kingdom: Animalia
- Phylum: Arthropoda
- Class: Insecta
- Order: Diptera
- Family: Tachinidae
- Subfamily: Exoristinae
- Tribe: Eryciini
- Genus: Botriopsis; Townsend, 1928

Type species
- Botriopsis bakeri Townsend, 1928

Genus of flies

Botriopsis is a genus of bristle flies in the family Tachinidae.

== Species ==
- Botriopsis bakeri Townsend, 1928

== Distribution ==
Philippines
