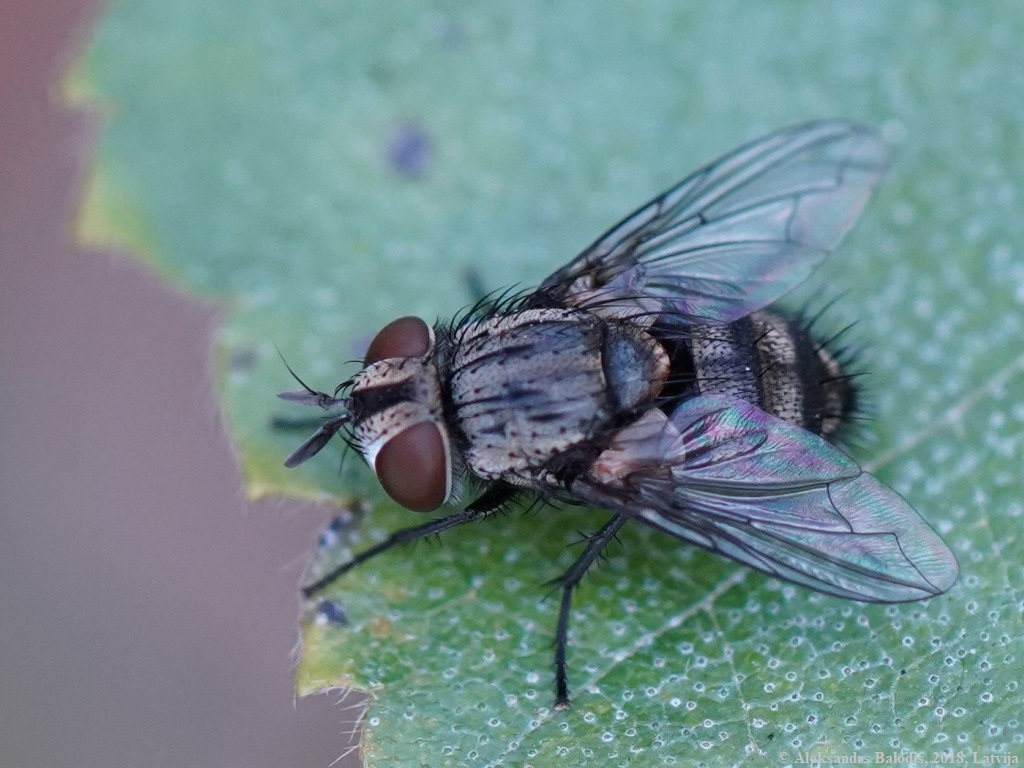
- Bactromyia aurulenta

Scientific classification
- Kingdom: Animalia
- Phylum: Arthropoda
- Class: Insecta
- Order: Diptera
- Family: Tachinidae
- Subfamily: Exoristinae
- Tribe: Eryciini
- Genus: Bactromyia; Brauer & von Bergenstamm, 1891

Type species
- Tachina scutelligera

Synonyms
- Meigeniopsis Brauer & von Bergenstamm, 1893; Discochaetopsis Townsend, 1916; Parathryptocera Brauer, 1898

= Bactromyia =

Genus of flies

Bactromyia is a genus of flies in the family Tachinidae.

== Species ==
- Bactromyia adiscalis Mesnil, 1953
- Bactromyia aurora Mesnil, 1953
- Bactromyia aurulenta (Meigen, 1824)
- Bactromyia delicatula Mesnil, 1953
- Bactromyia longifacies Mesnil, 1953
- Bactromyia mammillata Dear & Crosskey, 1982
- Bactromyia pieridis Mesnil & Abdul Rassoul, 1972
- Bactromyia zhumanovi Richter, 1991
