= Amblychaeta =

Scientific classification
- Kingdom: Animalia
- Phylum: Arthropoda
- Class: Insecta
- Order: Diptera
- Family: Tachinidae
- Subfamily: Exoristinae
- Tribe: Eryciini
- Genus: Amblychaeta; Aldrich, 1934

Type species
- Amblychaeta picticornis Aldrich, 1934

Genus of flies

Amblychaeta is a genus of flies in the family Tachinidae.

== Species ==
- Amblychaeta picticornis Aldrich, 1934

== Distribution ==
Argentina
