= Calocarcelia =

Scientific classification
- Kingdom: Animalia
- Phylum: Arthropoda
- Class: Insecta
- Order: Diptera
- Family: Tachinidae
- Subfamily: Exoristinae
- Tribe: Eryciini
- Genus: Calocarcelia; Townsend, 1927

Type species
- Calocarcelia fasciata Townsend, 1927

Synonyms
- Azulihoughia Townsend, 1934

Genus of flies

Calocarcelia is a genus of bristle flies in the family Tachinidae.

== Species ==
- Calocarcelia amazonica (Townsend, 1934)
- Calocarcelia aureocephala Thompson 1964
- Calocarcelia fasciata Townsend, 1927
- Calocarcelia minima Thompson 1964
- Calocarcelia orellana Townsend, 1929
- Calocarcelia trinitatis Thompson 1964
