= Eophyllophila elegans =

Scientific classification
- Kingdom: Animalia
- Phylum: Arthropoda
- Class: Insecta
- Order: Diptera
- Family: Tachinidae
- Subfamily: Exoristinae
- Tribe: Blondeliini
- Genus: Eophyllophila
- Species: E. elegans

Binomial name
- Eophyllophila elegans Townsend, 1926

Species of fly

Eophyllophila elegans is a species of fly in the family Tachinidae.

== Distribution ==
China, India, Sumatra, Malaysia, Nepal, Taiwan.
