= Podosturmia =

Scientific classification
- Kingdom: Animalia
- Phylum: Arthropoda
- Class: Insecta
- Order: Diptera
- Family: Tachinidae
- Subfamily: Exoristinae
- Tribe: Eryciini
- Genus: Podosturmia; Townsend, 1928

Type species
- Podosturmia dirphiae Townsend, 1928

Genus of flies

Podosturmia is a genus of flies in the family Tachinidae.

== Distribution ==
Brazil.
