= Austronilea =

Scientific classification
- Kingdom: Animalia
- Phylum: Arthropoda
- Clade: Pancrustacea
- Class: Insecta
- Order: Diptera
- Family: Tachinidae
- Subfamily: Exoristinae
- Tribe: Eryciini
- Genus: Austronilea; Crosskey, 1967

Type species
- Austronilea livida Crosskey, 1967

Genus of flies

Austronilea is a genus of flies in the family Tachinidae.

== Species ==
- Austronilea livida Crosskey, 1967

== Distribution ==
Australia
