= Doriella =

Scientific classification
- Kingdom: Animalia
- Phylum: Arthropoda
- Clade: Pancrustacea
- Class: Insecta
- Order: Diptera
- Family: Tachinidae
- Subfamily: Exoristinae
- Tribe: Eryciini
- Genus: Doriella; Townsend, 1931

Type species
- Doriella distincta Wiedemann, 1824

Genus of flies

Doriella is a genus of bristle flies in the family Tachinidae.

== Species ==
- Doriella distincta (Wiedemann, 1824)

== Distribution ==
West Indies.
