= Gymnophryxe =

Scientific classification
- Kingdom: Animalia
- Phylum: Arthropoda
- Class: Insecta
- Order: Diptera
- Family: Tachinidae
- Subfamily: Exoristinae
- Tribe: Eryciini
- Genus: Gymnophryxe; Villeneuve, 1922

Type species
- Ceratochaeta (Gymnophryxe) nudigena Villeneuve, 1922

Synonyms
- Archiclops Bischof, 1900

Genus of flies

Gymnophryxe is a genus of flies in the family Tachinidae.

== Species ==
- Gymnophryxe carthaginiensis (Bischof, 1900)
- Gymnophryxe claripennis (Reinhard, 1943)
- Gymnophryxe inconspicua (Villeneuve, 1924)
- Gymnophryxe modesta Herting, 1973
- Gymnophryxe nudigena (Villeneuve, 1922)
- Gymnophryxe theodori (Kugler, 1968)
