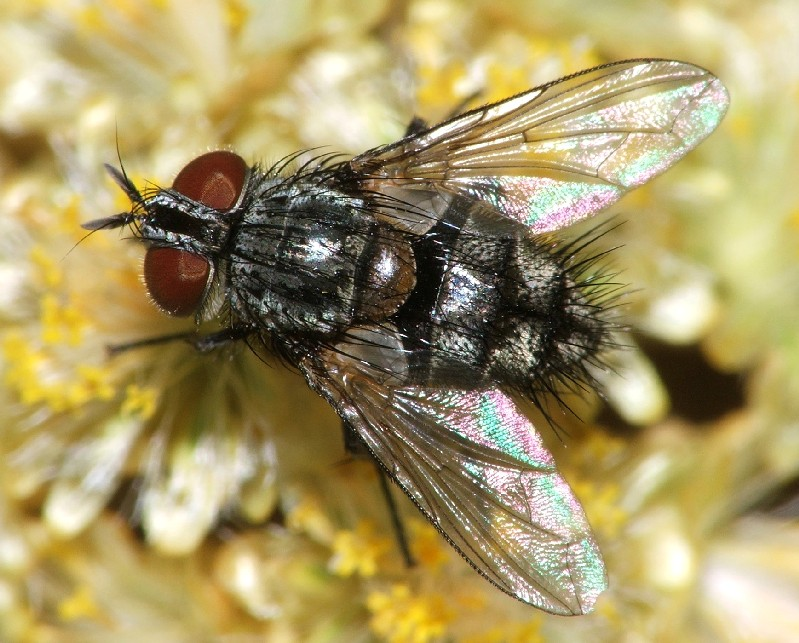
- Carcelia sp.

Scientific classification
- Kingdom: Animalia
- Phylum: Arthropoda
- Clade: Pancrustacea
- Class: Insecta
- Order: Diptera
- Family: Tachinidae
- Subfamily: Exoristinae
- Tribe: Eryciini

= Eryciini =

Tribe of flies

Eryciini is a tribe of flies in the family Tachinidae.

== Genera ==
- Acantholespesia Wood, 1987
- Afrophylax Cerretti & O’Hara, 2016
- Alsomyia Brauer & von Bergenstamm, 1891
- Amazohoughia Townsend, 1934
- Amblychaeta Aldrich, 1934
- Amelibaea Mesnil, 1955
- Ametadoria Townsend, 1927
- Amphicestonia Villeneuve, 1939
- Anadiscalia Curran, 1934
- Anadistichona Townsend, 1934
- Anemorilla Townsend, 1915
- Antistasea Bischof, 1904
- Aplomya Robineau-Desvoidy, 1830
- Aplomyopsis Townsend, 1927
- Aprotheca Macquart, 1851
- Argyrochaetona Townsend, 1919
- Argyrothelaira Townsend, 1916
- Asseclamyia Reinhard, 1956
- Austronilea Crosskey, 1967
- Austrophryno Townsend, 1916
- Azygobothria Townsend, 1911
- Bactromyia Brauer & von Bergenstamm, 1891
- Bactromyiella Mesnil, 1952
- Botriopsis Townsend, 1928
- Buquetia Robineau-Desvoidy, 1847
- Cadurciella Villeneuve, 1927
- Calocarcelia Townsend, 1927
- Carcelia Robineau-Desvoidy, 1830
- Carceliathrix Cerretti & O’Hara, 2016
- Carcelimyia Mesnil, 1944
- Carcelina Mesnil, 1944
- Carceliodoria Townsend, 1928
- Casahuiria Townsend, 1919
- Catagonia Brauer & von Bergenstamm, 1891
- Catena Richter, 1975
- Cavalieria Villeneuve, 1908
- Cestonia Rondani, 1861
- Cestonionerva Villeneuve, 1929
- Cestonioptera Villeneuve, 1939
- Chaetosisyrops Townsend, 1912
- Chetina Rondani, 1856
- Chlorogastropsis Townsend, 1926
- Chryserycia Mesnil, 1977
- Chrysometopiops Townsend, 1916
- Chrysosturmia Townsend, 1916
- Cossidophaga Baranov, 1934
- Descampsina Mesnil, 1956
- Diaprochaeta Mesnil, 1970
- Diglossocera Wulp, 1895
- Doriella Townsend, 1931
- Drino Robineau-Desvoidy, 1863
- Elodimyia Mesnil, 1952
- Epicampocera Macquart, 1849
- Erycesta Herting, 1967
- Erycia Robineau-Desvoidy, 1830
- Etroga Richter, 1995
- Eugaedioxenis Cerretti, O’Hara & Stireman, 2015
- Euhygia Mesnil, 1968
- Eulobomyia Woodley & Arnaud, 2008
- Eunemorilla Townsend, 1919
- Gymnophryxe Villeneuve, 1922
- Heliconiophaga Thompson, 1966
- Heliodorus Reinhard, 1964
- Hubneria Robineau-Desvoidy, 1848
- Hypersara Villeneuve, 1935
- Iconofrontina Townsend, 1931
- Intrapales Villeneuve, 1938
- Isosturmia Townsend, 1927
- Kaiseriola Mesnil, 1970
- Lasiopales Villeneuve, 1922
- Lespesia Robineau-Desvoidy, 1863
- Lubutana Villeneuve, 1938
- Lydella Robineau-Desvoidy, 1830
- Madremyia Townsend, 1916
- Metaphryno Crosskey, 1967
- Montserratia Thompson, 1964
- Myothyriopsis Townsend, 1919
- Neolydella Mesnil, 1939
- Neomedina Malloch, 1935
- Nepocarcelia Townsend, 1927
- Nilea Robineau-Desvoidy, 1863
- Paradrino Mesnil, 1949
- Periarchiclops Villeneuve, 1924
- Phebellia Robineau-Desvoidy, 1846
- Phonomyia Brauer & von Bergenstamm, 1893
- Phorocerostoma Malloch, 1930
- Phryxe Robineau-Desvoidy, 1830
- Podosturmia Townsend, 1928
- Procarcelia Townsend, 1927
- Prometopiops Townsend, 1927
- Prooppia Townsend, 1926
- Prospalaea Aldrich, 1925
- Pseudoperichaeta Brauer & von Bergenstamm, 1889
- Pseudosturmia Thompson, 1966
- Ptesiomyia Brauer & von Bergenstamm, 1893
- Ptilocatagonia Mesnil, 1956
- Rcortesia Koçak & Kemal, 2010
- Rhinaplomyia Mesnil, 1955
- Senometopia Macquart, 1834
- Sericodoria Townsend, 1928
- Setalunula Chao & Yang, 1990
- Siphosturmia Coquillett, 1897
- Sisyropa Brauer & von Bergenstamm, 1889
- Stenosturmia Townsend, 1927
- Sturmioactia Townsend, 1927
- Sturmiomima Townsend, 1934
- Sturmiopsis Townsend, 1916
- Sturmiopsoidea Thompson, 1966
- Stylocarcelia Zeegers, 2007
- Telonotomyia Cortés, 1986
- Teretrophora Macquart, 1851
- Thecocarcelia Townsend, 1933
- Thelairodrino Mesnil, 1954
- Thelyconychia Brauer & von Bergenstamm, 1889
- Thelymyia Brauer & von Bergenstamm, 1891
- Thelymyiops Mesnil, 1950
- Thysanosturmia Townsend, 1927
- Tlephusa Robineau-Desvoidy, 1863
- Topomeigenia Townsend, 1919
- Townsendiellomyia Baranov, 1932
- Tryphera Meigen, 1838
- Tsugaea Hall, 1939
- Verrugophryno Townsend, 1927
- Wardarina Mesnil, 1953
- Weingaertneriella Baranov, 1932
- Xylotachina Brauer & von Bergenstamm, 1891
- Zizyphomyia Townsend, 1916
- Zygozenillia Townsend, 1927
