= Nikolay Ilyich Baranov =

Russian entomologist (1887–1981)

Nikolay Ilyich Baranov (sometimes Baranoff; Russian: Николай Ильич Баранов; 1887, Oryol-1981, London) was a Russian entomologist who specialised in Diptera. His collection of Palearctic Tachinidae is held by the Smithsonian Institution Washington D.C. Baranov described many new species. He worked as an entomologist at the Institute of Hygiene in Zagreb.

== Works ==
partial list

- Baranov, N. 1926. Über die serbischen Simuliiden. Neue Beitr. syst. Insektenkde, 3: 183–194.
- Baranov, N. 1931. Neue orientalische Sarcophaginae (Dipt.). Konowia 10: 110–15.
- Baranov, N. 1931. Studien an pathogenen und parasitischen Insekten III. Beitrag zur Kenntnis der Raupenfliegengattung Carcelia R.D. Arbeiten aus der Parasitologischen Abteilung Institut für Hygiene und Schule für Volksgesundheit in Zagreb 3: 1-45
- Baranov, N. 1932 Neue orientalische Tachinidae. Encycl. Entomol. (B) II 6: 83–93.
- Baranov, N. 1932 Larvaevoridae (Ins. Dipt.) von Sumatra, I. Misc. Zool. Sumatrana 66: 1–3
- Baranov, N. 1932 Zur Kenntnis der formosanischen Sturmien (Dipt. Larvaevor.). Neue Beitr. Syst. Insektenkd. Berl. 5: 70–82.
- Baranov, N. 1934 Mitteilungen über gezüchtete orientalische Larvaevoriden. (Insecta, Diptera). Entomol. Nachrbl. 8: 41–49.
- Baranov, N. 1934 Neue Gattungen und Arten der orientalischen Raupenfliegen (Larvaevoridae)". Encyclopédie Entomologique. Série B. Mémoires et Notes. II. Diptera. 7: 160–165.
- Baranov, N. 1934 Zur Kenntnis der Raupenfliegenfauna der Salomon-Inseln (Dipt., Tachinidae). Stylops 3: 181–84.
- Baranov, N. 1934 Zur Kenntnis der parasitären Raupenfliegen der Salomonen, Neubritanniens, der Admiralitäts-Inseln, der Fidschi-Inseln und Neukaledoniens, nebst einer Bestimmungstabelle der orientalischen Sturmia-Arten. Veterinarski Archiv (Zagreb) 4: 472–85.
- Baranov, N. 1934 Übersicht der orientalischen Gattungen und Arten des Carcelia-Komplexes (Diptera: Tachinidae). Trans. R. Entomol. Soc. Lond. 82: 387–408.
- Baranov, N. 1935. Neue paläarktische und orientalische Raupenfliegen (Dipt., Tachinidae). Veterinarski Archiv (Zagreb) 5: 550–60.
- Baranov, N. 1936. Weitere Beiträge zur Kenntnis der parasitären Raupenfliegen (Tachinidae=Larvaevoridae) von den Salomonen und Neubritannien. Ann. Mag. Nat. Hist. (10) 17: 97–113.
- Baranov, N. 1938a. Weiteres über die Tachiniden (s.l.) der Salomon-Inseln. Veterinarski Archiv (Zagreb) 8: 170–74.
- Baranov, N. 1938b. Neue indo-australische Tachinidae. Bull. Entomol. Res. 29: 405–14.
- Baranov, N. 1942. Ein neuer Vespidenparasit von Java und eine mit ihm verwandte Fliege von den Salomon-Inseln. Veterinarski Archiv (Zagreb) 12: 161–63.
