= Joseph Villeneuve de Janti =

French entomologist

Joseph Théodore Villeneuve de Janti
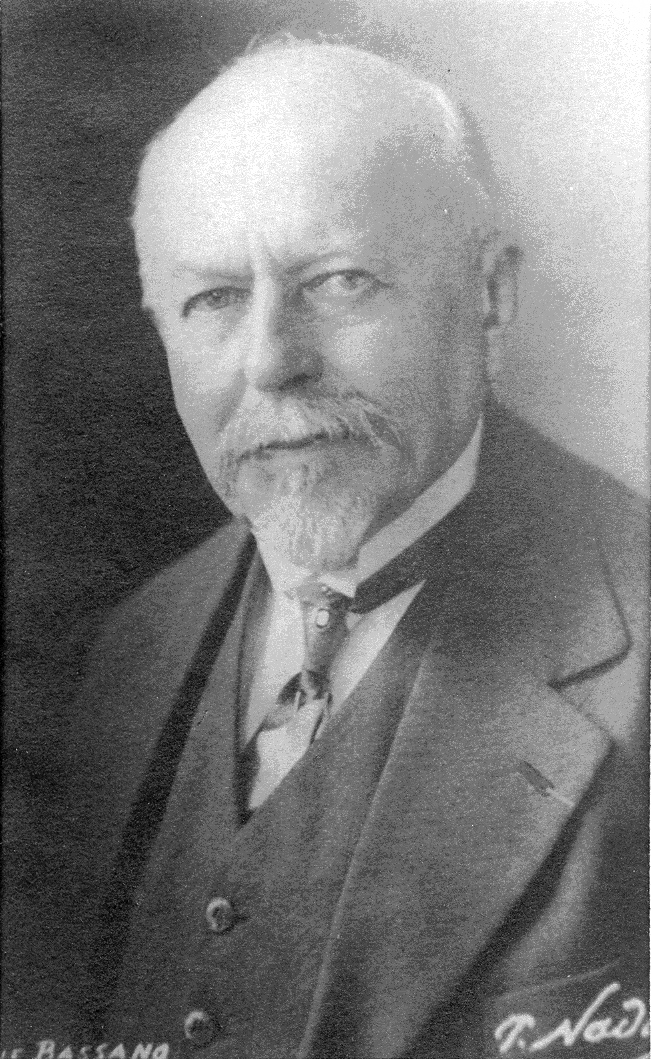
- Born: June 21, 1868
- Died: June 7, 1944 (aged 75)
- Known for: Contributions to medical entomology, naming of new taxa
- Scientific career
- Fields: Entomology
- Workplaces: Pasteur Institute; Muséum national d'histoire naturelle
- Author abbrev. (zoology): Villeneuve

Joseph Théodore Villeneuve de Janti (21 June 1868 – 7 June 1944) Was a French entomologist. He specialised in flies.

He worked in Paris at the Pasteur Institute and at the Muséum national d'histoire naturelle. As well as naming many new taxa Villeneuve made significant contributions to medical entomology. He was a Member of the Société Entomologique de France.

== Works ==
Partial list:

- 1911. "Description de deux nouveaux Diptères". Wien. Entomol. Ztg. 30: 81-84.)
- 1914. "Etude sur quelques types de myodaires supérieurs. I.Types de Fabricius et de Wiedemann du Museé zoologique de Copenhague". Rev. Zool. Afr. 3: 429-41.
- 1915. "Diptères nouveaux d'Afrique". Bull. Soc. Entomol. Fr. 1915: 225-27.
- 1918. "Espèes nouvelles de diptères de la famille des Cypselidae (Borboridae)". Bull. Soc. Entomol. Fr. 1917: 333-38.
- 1922. "Descriptions d'espèces nouvelles du genre 'Musca'". Ann. Sci. Nat. Zool. (10) 5: 335-36.
- 1926. "Descriptions de myodaires supérieurs nouveaux". Bull. Ann. Soc. R. Entomol. Belg. 66: 269-75.
- 1927. "Myodaires supérieurs nouveaux de l'Ile de Formose". Rev. Zool. Bot. Afr. 15: 387-97.
- 1929. "Myodaires supérieurs nouveaux". Bull. Ann. Soc. R. Entomol. Belg. 69: 61-68.
- 1936. "Schwedisch-chinesische wissenschaftliche Expedition nach den nordwestlichen Provinzen Chinas, unter Leitung von Dr. Sven Hedin und Prof. Sh Ping-chang. Insekten gesammelt vom schwedischen Arzt der Expedition Dr. David Hummel 1927—1930". 52. Diptera. 16. Muscidae. Ark. Zool. (A) 27(34), 13 p.
