= Chrysoexorista ochracea =

Scientific classification
- Kingdom: Animalia
- Phylum: Arthropoda
- Class: Insecta
- Order: Diptera
- Family: Tachinidae
- Subfamily: Exoristinae
- Tribe: Goniini
- Genus: Chrysoexorista
- Species: C. ochracea

Binomial name
- Chrysoexorista ochracea (Wulp, 1890)

Synonyms
- Chrysomasicera borealis Townsend, 1915; Exorista ochracea Wulp, 1890

Species of fly

Chrysoexorista ochracea is a species of bristle fly in the family Tachinidae.

== Distribution ==
Costa Rica, Mexico, Venezuela.
