= Chrysoexorista =

Scientific classification
- Kingdom: Animalia
- Phylum: Arthropoda
- Clade: Pancrustacea
- Class: Insecta
- Order: Diptera
- Family: Tachinidae
- Subfamily: Exoristinae
- Tribe: Goniini
- Genus: Chrysoexorista; Townsend, 1915

Type species
- Chrysoexorista viridis Townsend, 1915

Synonyms
- Chrysodoria Townsend, 1934; Chrysomasicera Townsend, 1915

Genus of flies

Chrysoexorista is a genus of flies in the family Tachinidae.

== Species ==
- Chrysoexorista angutifrons Townsend, 1916
- Chrysoexorista caeruleiventris Wulp, 1890
- Chrysoexorista chalcos (Townsend, 1934)
- Chrysoexorista dawsoni (Sellers, 1943)
- Chrysoexorista facialis (Sellers, 1943)
- Chrysoexorista fulgoris (Sellers, 1943)
- Chrysoexorista lineata (Wulp, 1890)
- Chrysoexorista marginata (Aldrich & Webber, 1924)
- Chrysoexorista nigricauda (Wulp, 1890)
- Chrysoexorista ochracea (Wulp, 1890)
- Chrysoexorista taglinoi (Sellers, 1943)
- Chrysoexorista viridis Townsend, 1915
