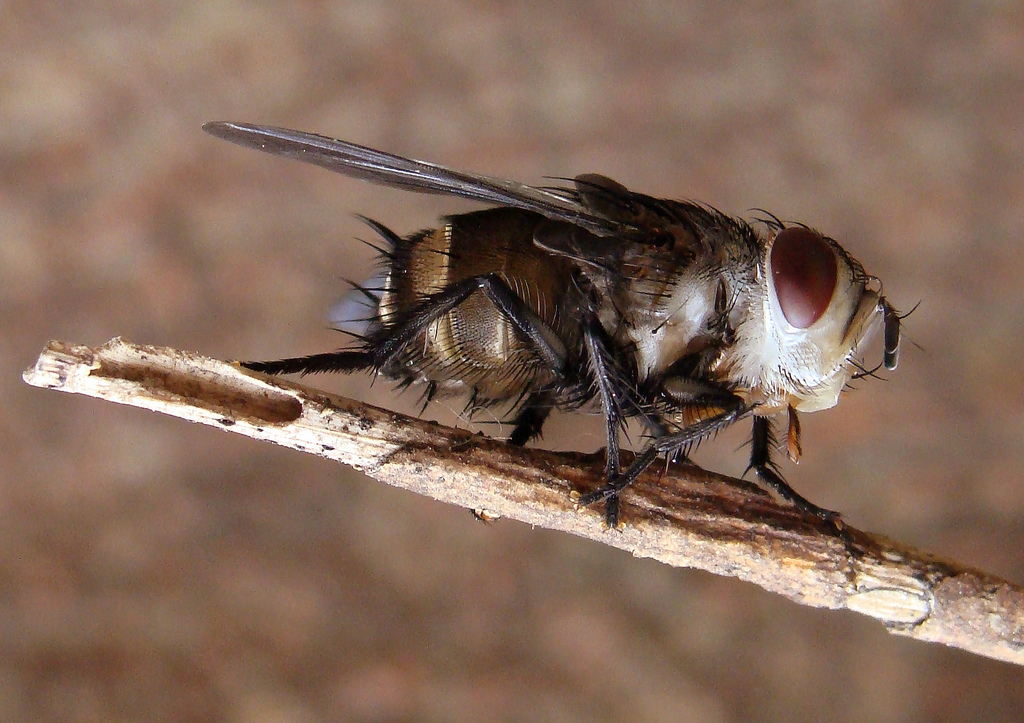

Scientific classification
- Kingdom: Animalia
- Phylum: Arthropoda
- Clade: Pancrustacea
- Class: Insecta
- Order: Diptera
- Family: Tachinidae
- Subfamily: Exoristinae
- Tribe: Blondeliini
- Genus: Compsiluroides
- Species: C. concinnata

Binomial name
- Compsilura concinnata (Meigen, 1824)

Synonyms
- Compsilura samoaensis Malloch, 1935; Doria meditabunda Meigen, 1838; Macherea serriventris Rondani, 1859; Phorocera antiopis Robineau-Desvoidy, 1830; Phorocera bercei Robineau-Desvoidy, 1850; Phorocera bombycivora Robineau-Desvoidy, 1830; Phorocera caiae Robineau-Desvoidy, 1830; Phorocera cuculliae Robineau-Desvoidy, 1850; Phorocera degeerioides Wulp, 1893; Phorocera degeeroides Wulp, 1893; Phorocera flavifrons Robineau-Desvoidy, 1851; Phorocera guerini Robineau-Desvoidy, 1850; Phorocera hadenae Robineau-Desvoidy, 1851; Phorocera hyalipennis Macquart, 1851; Phorocera iovora Robineau-Desvoidy, 1830; Phorocera noctuarum Robineau-Desvoidy, 1830; Phorocera orgyae Robineau-Desvoidy, 1850; Phorocera orthalidis Robineau-Desvoidy, 1850; Phorocera pieridis Robineau-Desvoidy, 1850; Phorocera prorsae Robineau-Desvoidy, 1830; Phorocera pusilla Robineau-Desvoidy, 1850; Phorocera pygerae Robineau-Desvoidy, 1830; Phorocera selecta Curran, 1940; Tachina acronyctae Bouché, 1834; Tachina concinnata Meigen, 1824; Tachina munda Meigen, 1824; Tachina taeniata Meigen, 1824

= Compsilura concinnata =

Species of fly

Compsilura concinnata (tachinid fly; order Diptera) is a parasitoid native to Europe that was introduced to North America in 1906 to control invasive populations of the exotic spongy moth (Lymantria dispar), which primarily infests forests. The fly is an endoparasitoid of insect larvae that lives within its host for most of its life. The parasitoid eventually kills the host and occasionally eats it. It attacks over 200 host species, mainly insects from the orders Coleoptera, Lepidoptera, and Hymenoptera.

As C. concinnata attacks many different types of hosts, it has spilled over from the intended forest systems into other areas such as agricultural fields, parasitizing such cabbage pests as the cabbage looper (Trichoplusia ni) and the exotic invasive cabbage white (Pieris rapae), as well as other invasive species such as the brown-tail moth (Euproctis chrysorrhoea). However, it also attacks native, non-pest insects, including the monarch butterfly (Danaus plexippus), the cecropia moth (Hyalophora cecropia), the promethea silkmoth (Callosamia promethea), the luna moth (Actias luna), and the buck moth (Hemileuca maia).

== Morphology ==
C. concinnata larvae are creamy colored and have black mouth hooks with three anal hooks. Pupae, the life stage in insects when undergoing transformation, are brown, 6.5 mm long and oval shape. Adult flies look very similar in its size/shape to the house-fly. Adults have a white face and a thorax containing four black stripes and reach up to 7.5 mm long.

== Life cycle ==
C. concinnata is ovoviviparous. In a year, approximately 3–4 generations occur (multivoltine) with an adult life span of 5–22 days. The parasitoid's larvae typically survive winters within their hosts' larvae. As L. dispar overwinters as eggs, the fly parasitizes other hosts when overwintering. After mating has occurred, the adult female seeks host larvae. After finding a suitable host, she attaches to its back using her anal hooks, punctures the host's integument with a piercing structure on her abdomen, and injects a single larva into the host's midgut or body cavity. The female produces about 100 larvae. She will sometimes attack the same host multiple times. If she injects a larva directly into the host's body cavity, the larva migrates to the host's midgut, penetrates it, and undergoes three instars. The parasitoid remains a larva for 10–17 days until its host prepares to pupate, at which time it emerges from its host and pupates on another substrate or in or on soil.

C. concinnata larvae typically kill their hosts in approximately 10 days. After emerging from a host, its white maggot forms a smooth, reddish brown case (a puparium) around itself. During the next stage of its life cycle, the larva molts into a pupa inside of the puparium.

== Impact after introduction to North America ==
Compsilura concinnata has a negative impact on many species of Lepidoptera native to North America.

1. The fly is multivoltine while the main target for its introduction, Lymantria dispar, is univoltine.
2. Since L. dispar overwinters as eggs, the fly parasitizes non-target species when overwintering.
3. Due to its flexible life cycle, the fly parasitizes more than 150 species of North American butterflies and moths.

== Parasitism ==
Although C. concinnata was introduced to North America to control the spongy moth population, it typically parasitizes fewer than 5% of such moths during an outbreak. However, the percentage of infected moths tends to increase as their population declines. Because C. concinnata attacks many other species, it is not always as effective a parasitoid of L. dispar as are other parasites.
