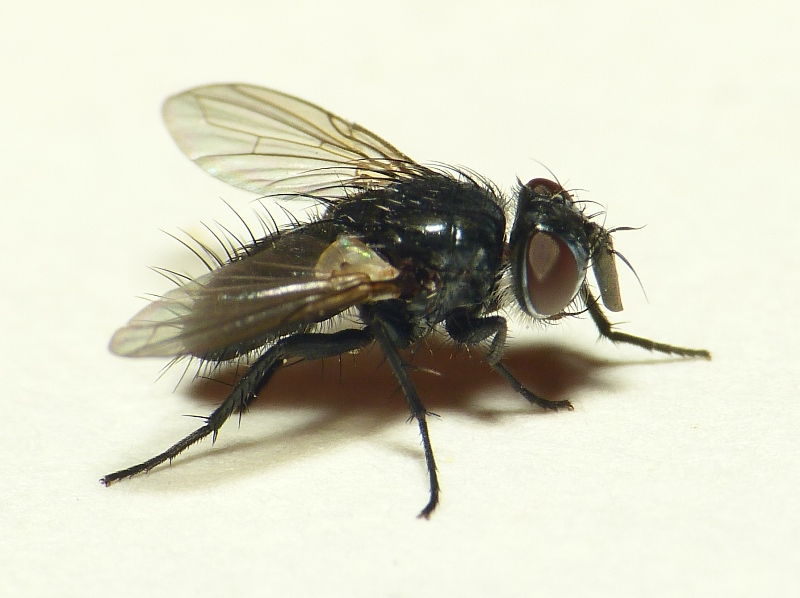
- Ligeria angusticornis

Scientific classification
- Domain: Eukaryota
- Kingdom: Animalia
- Phylum: Arthropoda
- Class: Insecta
- Order: Diptera
- Family: Tachinidae
- Subfamily: Exoristinae
- Tribe: Blondeliini; Robineau-Desvoidy, 1863

= Blondeliini =

Tribe of flies

Blondeliini is a tribe of parasitic flies in the family Tachinidae. Larvae are parasitoids of other insects, mostly beetles and caterpillars. Although nearly cosmopolitan, its greatest diversity is in the New World and especially in South America.

== Genera ==
- Actinodoria Townsend, 1927
- Admontia Brauer & von Bergenstamm, 1889
- Aesia Richter, 2011
- Afrolixa Curran, 1939
- Anagonia Brauer & von Bergenstamm, 1891
- Anametopochaeta Townsend, 1919
- Anechuromyia Mesnil & Shima, 1979
- Angustia Sellers, 1943
- Anisia Wulp, 1890
- Anomalostomyia Cerretti & Barraclough, 2007
- Anoxynops Townsend, 1927
- Balde Rice, 2005
- Bampura Tschorsnig, 1983
- Belida Robineau-Desvoidy, 1863
- Binghamimyia Townsend, 1919
- Biomeigenia Mesnil, 1961
- Blondelia Robineau-Desvoidy, 1830
- Borgmeiermyia Townsend, 1935
- Caenisomopsis Townsend, 1934
- Calodexia Wulp, 1891
- Calolydella Townsend, 1927
- Celatoria Coquillett, 1890
- Chaetodoria Townsend, 1927
- Chaetolixophaga Blanchard, 1940
- Chaetona Wulp, 1891
- Chaetonodexodes Townsend, 1916
- Chaetostigmoptera Townsend, 1916
- Chaetoxynops Townsend, 1928
- Compsilura Bouché, 1834
- Compsiluroides Mesnil, 1953
- Conactia Townsend, 1927
- Conactiodoria Townsend, 1934
- Conogaster Brauer & von Bergenstamm, 1891
- Croesoactia Townsend, 1927
- Cryptomeigenia Brauer & von Bergenstamm, 1891
- Cuparymyia Townsend, 1934
- Degeeriopsis Mesnil, 1953
- Deltomyza Malloch, 1931
- Dexodomintho Townsend, 1935
- Dolichocoxys Townsend, 1927
- Dolichotarsina Mesnil, 1977
- Dolichotarsus Brooks, 1945
- Drinomyia Mesnil, 1962
- Egameigenia Townsend, 1927
- Enrogalia Reinhard, 1964
- Eomedina Mesnil, 1960
- Eomeigenielloides Reinhard, 1975
- Eophyllophila Townsend, 1926
- Epiphanocera Townsend, 1915
- Eribella Mesnil, 1960
- Erynniola Mesnil, 1977
- Erynniopsis Townsend, 1926
- Erythroargyrops Townsend, 1917
- Erythromelana Townsend, 1919
- Euanisia Blanchard, 1947
- Eucelatoria Townsend, 1909
- Euhalidaya Walton, 1914
- Eumachaeraea Townsend, 1927
- Euthelyconychia Townsend, 1927
- Filistea Cerretti & O’Hara, 2016
- Froggattimyia Townsend, 1916
- Gastrolepta Rondani, 1862
- Hemimacquartia Brauer & von Bergenstamm, 1893
- Hypodoria Townsend, 1927
- Hypoproxynops Townsend, 1927
- Ictericodexia Townsend, 1934
- Incamyia Townsend, 1912
- Incamyiopsis Townsend, 1919
- Ischyrophaga Townsend, 1915
- Istocheta Rondani, 1859
- Italispidea Townsend, 1927
- Italydella Townsend, 1927
- Kallisomyia Borisova-Zinovjeva, 1964
- Kiniatiliops Mesnil, 1955
- Kiniatilla Villeneuve, 1938
- Latiginella Villeneuve, 1936
- Lecanipa Rondani, 1859
- Leiophora Robineau-Desvoidy, 1863
- Leptostylum Macquart, 1851
- Leskiolydella Townsend, 1927
- Ligeria Robineau-Desvoidy, 1863
- Ligeriella Mesnil, 1961
- Lindneriola Mesnil, 1959
- Lixadmontia Wood & Cave, 2006
- Lixophaga Townsend, 1908
- Lomachantha Rondani, 1859
- Lydellothelaira Townsend, 1919
- Lydinolydella Townsend, 1927
- Mauritiodoria Townsend, 1932
- Medina Robineau-Desvoidy, 1830
- Medinodexia Townsend, 1927
- Medinomyia Mesnil, 1957
- Medinospila Mesnil, 1977
- Meigenia Robineau-Desvoidy, 1830
- Meigenielloides Townsend, 1919
- Melanorlopteryx Townsend, 1927
- Melanoromintho Townsend, 1935
- Mellachnus Aldrich, 1934
- Metopoactia Townsend, 1927
- Miamimyia Townsend, 1916
- Miamimyiops Townsend, 1939
- Microaporia Townsend, 1919
- Minthopsis Townsend, 1915
- Monoleptophaga Baranov, 1938
- Myiodoriops Townsend, 1935
- Myiomintho Brauer & von Bergenstamm, 1889
- Myiopharus Brauer & von Bergenstamm, 1889
- Neominthopsis Townsend, 1915
- Neophasmophaga Guimarães, 1982
- Notomanes Aldrich, 1934
- Oedemamedina Townsend, 1927
- Ollachactia Townsend, 1927
- Ollachea Townsend, 1919
- Ophirion Townsend, 1911
- Opsomeigenia Townsend, 1919
- Oswaldia Robineau-Desvoidy, 1863
- Oxyaporia Townsend, 1919
- Oxynops Townsend, 1912
- Paracraspedothrix Villeneuve, 1920
- Parapoliops Blanchard, 1957
- Pararondania Villeneuve, 1916
- Paratrixa Brauer & von Bergenstamm, 1891
- Pareupogona Townsend, 1916
- Paropsivora Malloch, 1934
- Paxiximyia Toma & Olivier, 2018
- Pelashyria Villeneuve, 1935
- Phasmophaga Townsend, 1909
- Phyllophilopsis Townsend, 1915
- Phyllophryno Townsend, 1927
- Phytorophaga Bezzi, 1923
- Picconia Robineau-Desvoidy, 1863
- Pilimyia Malloch, 1930
- Piximactia Townsend, 1927
- Policheta Rondani, 1856
- Poliops Aldrich, 1934
- Prodegeeria Brauer & von Bergenstamm, 1894
- Proroglutea Townsend, 1919
- Prospherysodoria Townsend, 1928
- Prosuccingulum Mesnil, 1959
- Protaporia Townsend, 1919
- Pseudoredtenbacheria Brauer & von Bergenstamm, 1889
- Pseudorrhinactia Thompson, 1968
- Pseudoviviania Brauer & von Bergenstamm, 1891
- Ptilodegeeria Brauer & von Bergenstamm, 1891
- Rhombothyriops Townsend, 1915
- Rioteria Herting, 1973
- Robinaldia Herting, 1983
- Sphaerina Wulp, 1890
- Staurochaeta Brauer & von Bergenstamm, 1889
- Steleoneura Stein, 1924
- Succingulodes Townsend, 1935
- Tetrigimyia Shima & Takahashi, 2011
- Tettigoniophaga Guimarães, 1978
- Thelairochaetona Townsend, 1919
- Thelairodoria Townsend, 1927
- Thelairodoriopsis Thompson, 1968
- Thelyoxynops Townsend, 1927
- Trichinochaeta Townsend, 1917
- Trigonospila Pokorny, 1886
- Urodexia Osten Sacken, 1882
- Uroeuantha Townsend, 1927
- Uromedina Townsend, 1926
- Vibrissina Rondani, 1861
- Zaira Robineau-Desvoidy, 1830
- Zenargomyia Crosskey, 1964
- Zosteromeigenia Townsend, 1919
