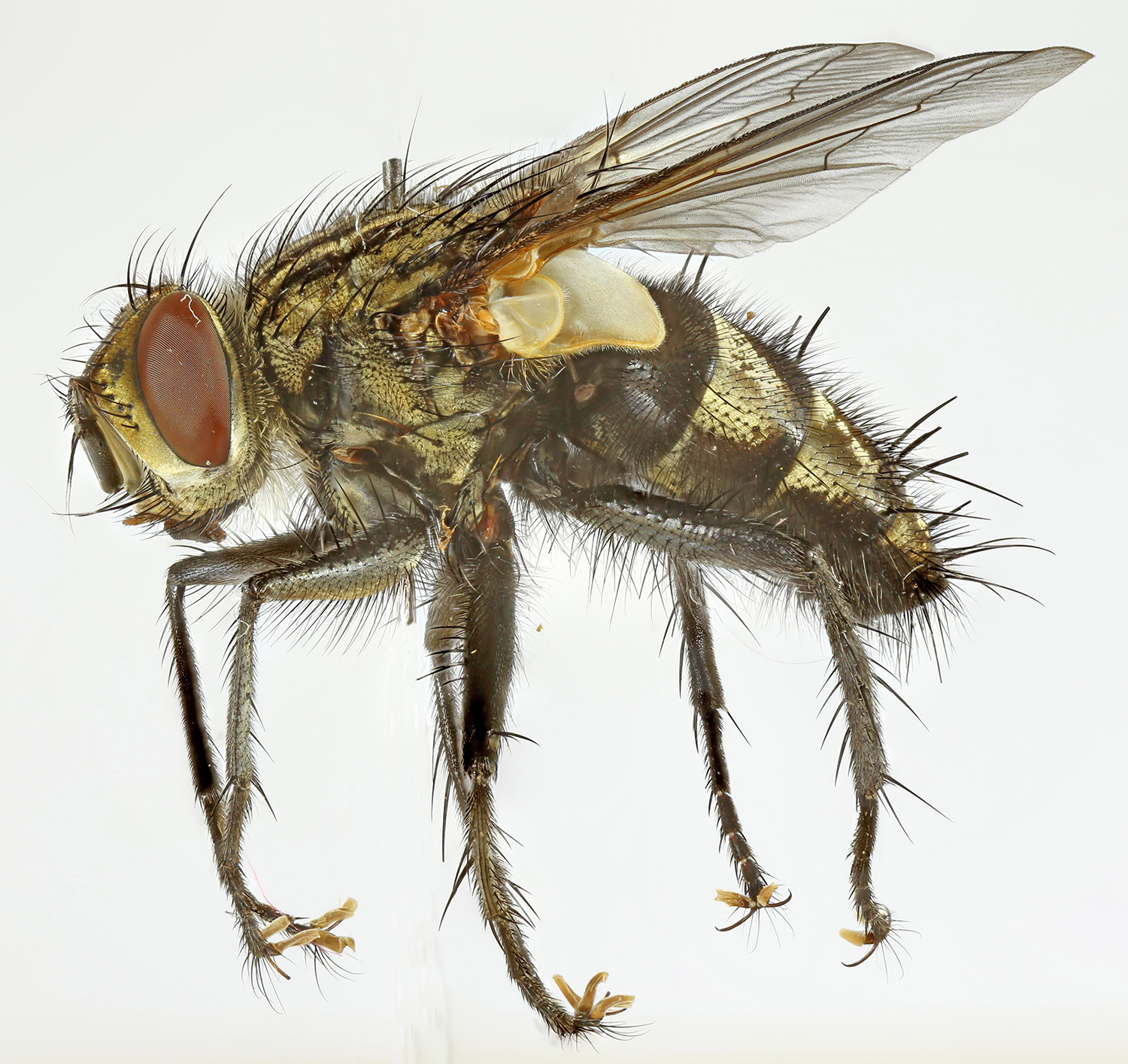
- Exorista larvarum

Scientific classification
- Kingdom: Animalia
- Phylum: Arthropoda
- Clade: Pancrustacea
- Class: Insecta
- Order: Diptera
- Family: Tachinidae
- Subfamily: Exoristinae; Robineau-Desvoidy, 1863

= Exoristinae =

Subfamily of flies

Exoristinae is a subfamily of flies in the family Tachinidae. Most species are parasitoids of caterpillars.

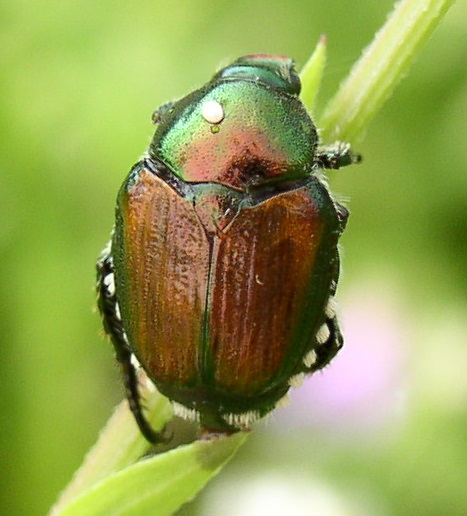
Egg of Istocheta aldrichi on Japanese beetle

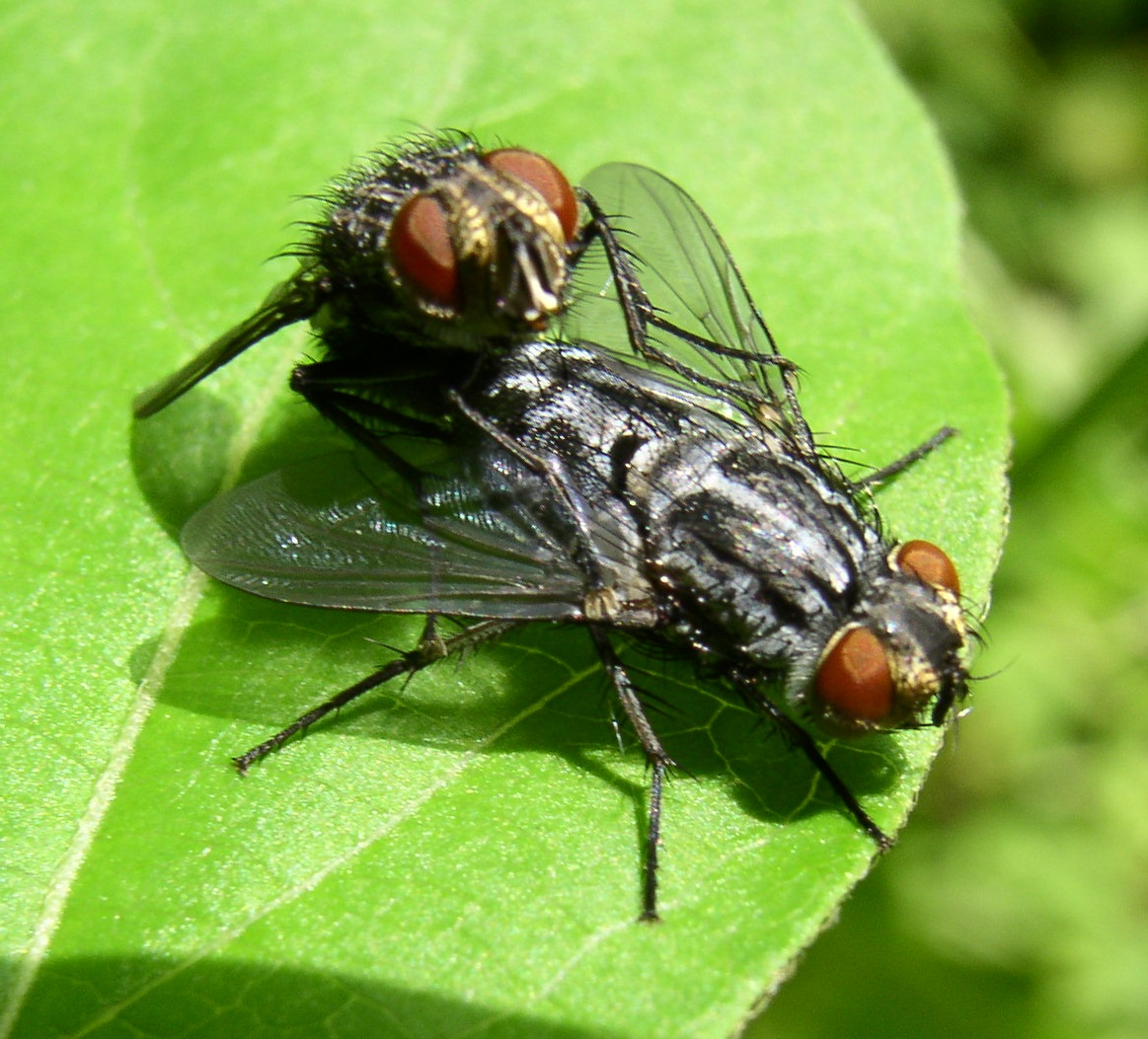
Mating pair of flies of the tribe Goniini

== Tribes & genera ==
- Tribe Acemyini Brauer & von Bergenstamm, 1889
  - Acemya Robineau-Desvoidy, 1830
  - Atlantomyia Crosskey, 1977
  - Ceracia Rondani, 1865
  - Charitella Mesnil, 1957
  - Eoacemyia Townsend, 1926
  - Hygiella Mesnil, 1957
  - Metacemyia Herting, 1969
- Tribe Anacamptomyiini
  - Anacamptomyia Bischof, 1904
  - Euvespivora Baranov, 1942
  - Isochaetina Mesnil, 1950
  - Koralliomyia Mesnil, 1950
  - Leucocarcelia Villeneuve, 1921
  - Parapales Mesnil, 1950
- Tribe Blondeliini
  - Actinodoria Townsend, 1927
  - Admontia Brauer & von Bergenstamm, 1889
  - Aesia Richter, 2011
  - Afrolixa Curran, 1939
  - Anagonia Brauer & von Bergenstamm, 1891
  - Anametopochaeta Townsend, 1919
  - Anechuromyia Mesnil & Shima, 1979
  - Angustia Sellers, 1943
  - Anisia Wulp, 1890
  - Anomalostomyia Cerretti & Barraclough, 2007
  - Anoxynops Townsend, 1927
  - Balde Rice, 2005
  - Bampura Tschorsnig, 1983
  - Belida Robineau-Desvoidy, 1863
  - Binghamimyia Townsend, 1919
  - Biomeigenia Mesnil, 1961
  - Blondelia Robineau-Desvoidy, 1830
  - Borgmeiermyia Townsend, 1935
  - Caenisomopsis Townsend, 1934
  - Calodexia Wulp, 1891
  - Calolydella Townsend, 1927
  - Celatoria Coquillett, 1890
  - Chaetodoria Townsend, 1927
  - Chaetolixophaga Blanchard, 1940
  - Chaetona Wulp, 1891
  - Chaetonodexodes Townsend, 1916
  - Chaetostigmoptera Townsend, 1916
  - Chaetoxynops Townsend, 1928
  - Compsilura Bouché, 1834
  - Compsiluroides Mesnil, 1953
  - Conactia Townsend, 1927
  - Conactiodoria Townsend, 1934
  - Conogaster Brauer & von Bergenstamm, 1891
  - Croesoactia Townsend, 1927
  - Cryptomeigenia Brauer & von Bergenstamm, 1891
  - Cuparymyia Townsend, 1934
  - Degeeriopsis Mesnil, 1953
  - Deltomyza Malloch, 1931
  - Dexodomintho Townsend, 1935
  - Dolichocoxys Townsend, 1927
  - Dolichotarsina Mesnil, 1977
  - Dolichotarsus Brooks, 1945
  - Drinomyia Mesnil, 1962
  - Egameigenia Townsend, 1927
  - Enrogalia Reinhard, 1964
  - Eomedina Mesnil, 1960
  - Eomeigenielloides Reinhard, 1975
  - Eophyllophila Townsend, 1926
  - Epiphanocera Townsend, 1915
  - Eribella Mesnil, 1960
  - Erynniola Mesnil, 1977
  - Erynniopsis Townsend, 1926
  - Erythroargyrops Townsend, 1917
  - Erythromelana Townsend, 1919
  - Euanisia Blanchard, 1947
  - Eucelatoria Townsend, 1909
  - Euhalidaya Walton, 1914
  - Eumachaeraea Townsend, 1927
  - Euthelyconychia Townsend, 1927
  - Filistea Cerretti & O'Hara, 2016
  - Froggattimyia Townsend, 1916
  - Gastrolepta Rondani, 1862
  - Hemimacquartia Brauer & von Bergenstamm, 1893
  - Hypodoria Townsend, 1927
  - Hypoproxynops Townsend, 1927
  - Ictericodexia Townsend, 1934
  - Incamyia Townsend, 1912
  - Incamyiopsis Townsend, 1919
  - Ischyrophaga Townsend, 1915
  - Istocheta Rondani, 1859
  - Italispidea Townsend, 1927
  - Italydella Townsend, 1927
  - Kallisomyia Borisova-Zinovjeva, 1964
  - Kiniatiliops Mesnil, 1955
  - Kiniatilla Villeneuve, 1938
  - Latiginella Villeneuve, 1936
  - Lecanipa Rondani, 1859
  - Leiophora Robineau-Desvoidy, 1863
  - Leptostylum Macquart, 1851
  - Leskiolydella Townsend, 1927
  - Ligeria Robineau-Desvoidy, 1863
  - Ligeriella Mesnil, 1961
  - Lindneriola Mesnil, 1959
  - Lixadmontia Wood & Cave, 2006
  - Lixophaga Townsend, 1908
  - Lomachantha Rondani, 1859
  - Lydellothelaira Townsend, 1919
  - Lydinolydella Townsend, 1927
  - Mauritiodoria Townsend, 1932
  - Medina Robineau-Desvoidy, 1830
  - Medinodexia Townsend, 1927
  - Medinomyia Mesnil, 1957
  - Medinospila Mesnil, 1977
  - Meigenia Robineau-Desvoidy, 1830
  - Meigenielloides Townsend, 1919
  - Melanorlopteryx Townsend, 1927
  - Melanoromintho Townsend, 1935
  - Mellachnus Aldrich, 1934
  - Metopoactia Townsend, 1927
  - Miamimyia Townsend, 1916
  - Miamimyiops Townsend, 1939
  - Microaporia Townsend, 1919
  - Minthopsis Townsend, 1915
  - Monoleptophaga Baranov, 1938
  - Myiodoriops Townsend, 1935
  - Myiomintho Brauer & von Bergenstamm, 1889
  - Myiopharus Brauer & von Bergenstamm, 1889
  - Neominthopsis Townsend, 1915
  - Neophasmophaga Guimarães, 1982
  - Notomanes Aldrich, 1934
  - Oedemamedina Townsend, 1927
  - Ollachactia Townsend, 1927
  - Ollachea Townsend, 1919
  - Ophirion Townsend, 1911
  - Opsomeigenia Townsend, 1919
  - Oswaldia Robineau-Desvoidy, 1863
  - Oxyaporia Townsend, 1919
  - Oxynops Townsend, 1912
  - Paracraspedothrix Villeneuve, 1920
  - Parapoliops Blanchard, 1957
  - Pararondania Villeneuve, 1916
  - Paratrixa Brauer & von Bergenstamm, 1891
  - Pareupogona Townsend, 1916
  - Paropsivora Malloch, 1934
  - Paxiximyia Toma & Olivier, 2018
  - Pelashyria Villeneuve, 1935
  - Phasmophaga Townsend, 1909
  - Phyllophilopsis Townsend, 1915
  - Phyllophryno Townsend, 1927
  - Phytorophaga Bezzi, 1923
  - Picconia Robineau-Desvoidy, 1863
  - Pilimyia Malloch, 1930
  - Piximactia Townsend, 1927
  - Policheta Rondani, 1856
  - Poliops Aldrich, 1934
  - Prodegeeria Brauer & von Bergenstamm, 1894
  - Proroglutea Townsend, 1919
  - Prospherysodoria Townsend, 1928
  - Prosuccingulum Mesnil, 1959
  - Protaporia Townsend, 1919
  - Pseudoredtenbacheria Brauer & von Bergenstamm, 1889
  - Pseudorrhinactia Thompson, 1968
  - Pseudoviviania Brauer & von Bergenstamm, 1891
  - Ptilodegeeria Brauer & von Bergenstamm, 1891
  - Rhombothyriops Townsend, 1915
  - Rioteria Herting, 1973
  - Robinaldia Herting, 1983
  - Sphaerina Wulp, 1890
  - Staurochaeta Brauer & von Bergenstamm, 1889
  - Steleoneura Stein, 1924
  - Succingulodes Townsend, 1935
  - Tetrigimyia Shima & Takahashi, 2011
  - Tettigoniophaga Guimarães, 1978
  - Thelairochaetona Townsend, 1919
  - Thelairodoria Townsend, 1927
  - Thelairodoriopsis Thompson, 1968
  - Thelyoxynops Townsend, 1927
  - Trichinochaeta Townsend, 1917
  - Trigonospila Pokorny, 1886
  - Urodexia Osten Sacken, 1882
  - Uroeuantha Townsend, 1927
  - Uromedina Townsend, 1926
  - Vibrissina Rondani, 1861
  - Zaira Robineau-Desvoidy, 1830
  - Zenargomyia Crosskey, 1964
  - Zosteromeigenia Townsend, 1919
- Tribe Eryciini
  - Acantholespesia Wood, 1987
  - Alsomyia Brauer & von Bergenstamm, 1891
  - Amelibaea Mesnil, 1955
  - Ametadoria Townsend, 1927
  - Aplomya Robineau-Desvoidy, 1830
  - Aplomyopsis Townsend, 1927
  - Bactromyia Brauer & Bergenstamm, 1891
  - Bactromyiella Mesnil, 1952
  - Buquetia Robineau-Desvoidy, 1847
  - Cadurciella Villeneuve, 1927
  - Carcelia Robineau-Desvoidy, 1830
  - Catagonia Brauer & von Bergenstamm, 1891
  - Cestonionerva Villeneuve, 1929
  - Diglossocera Wulp, 1895
  - Drino Robineau-Desvoidy, 1863
  - Epicampocera Macquart, 1849
  - Erycesta Herting, 1967
  - Erycia Robineau-Desvoidy, 1830
  - Euhygia Mesnil, 1968
  - Eunemorilla Townsend, 1919
  - Gymnophryxe Villeneuve, 1922
  - Hapalioloemus Baranov, 1934
  - Heliodorus Reinhard, 1964
  - Huebneria Robineau-Desvoidy, 1847
  - Isosturmia Townsend, 1927,
  - Lespesia Robineau-Desvoidy, 1863
  - Lydella Robineau-Desvoidy, 1830
  - Madremyia Townsend, 1916
  - Myothyriopsis Townsend, 1919
  - Nilea Robineau-Desvoidy, 1863
  - Paradrino Mesnil, 1949
  - Parapales Mesnil, 1950
  - Periarchiclops Villeneuve, 1924
  - Phebellia Robineau-Desvoidy, 1846
  - Phonomyia Brauer & von Bergenstamm, 1893
  - Phryxe Robineau-Desvoidy, 1830
  - Prooppia Townsend, 1926
  - Pseudoperichaeta Brauer & Bergenstamm, 1889
  - Rhinaplomyia Mesnil, 1955
  - Rhinomyodes Townsend, 1933
  - Senometopia Macquart, 1834
  - Setalunula Chao & Yang, 1990
  - Siphosturmia Coquillett, 1897
  - Sisyropa Brauer & Bergenstamm, 1889
  - Sturmiopsis Townsend, 1916
  - Thecocarcelia Townsend, 1933
  - Thelyconychia Brauer & von Bergenstamm, 1889
  - Thelymyia Brauer & von Bergenstamm, 1891
  - Tlephusa Robineau-Desvoidy, 1863
  - Townsendiellomyia Baranov, 1932
  - Tryphera Meigen, 1838
  - Tsugaea Hall, 1939
  - Weingaertneriella Baranov, 1932
  - Xylotachina Brauer & von Bergenstamm, 1891
  - Zizyphomyia Townsend, 1916
- Tribe Ethillini
  - Amnonia Kugler, 1971
  - Atylomyia Brauer, 1898
  - Calliethilla Shima, 1979
  - Ethilla Robineau-Desvoidy, 1863
  - Ethylloides Verbeke, 1970
  - Gynandromyia Bezzi, 1923
  - Mycteromyiella Mesnil, 1966
  - Nemorilloides Brauer & von Bergenstamm, 1891
  - Neoethilla Cerretti, Wood & O'Hara, 2012
  - Paratryphera Brauer & von Bergenstamm, 1891
  - Phorocerosoma Townsend, 1927
  - Prosethilla Herting, 1984
  - Zelindopsis Anonymous, 1946
- Tribe Euthelairini
  - Asilidotachina Townsend, 1931
  - Cerotachina Arnaud, 1963
  - Cryptocladocera Bezzi, 1923
  - Euthelaira Townsend, 1912
  - Hypohoughia Townsend, 1927
  - Iteuthelaira Townsend, 1927
  - Minthotachina Townsend, 1935
  - Neomintho Brauer & von Bergenstamm, 1891
  - Neominthoidea Thompson, 1968
  - Pelecotheca Townsend, 1919
- Tribe Exoristini
  - Alloprosopaea Villeneuve, 1923
  - Austrophorocera Townsend, 1916
  - Bessa Robineau-Desvoidy, 1863
  - Chaetexorista Brauer & von Bergenstamm, 1894
  - Chaetoria Becker, 1908
  - Chetogena Rondani, 1856
  - Crassicornia Kugler, 1980
  - Ctenophorinia Mesnil, 1963
  - Eozenillia Townsend, 1926
  - Exorista Meigen, 1803
  - Gueriniopsis Reinhard, 1943
  - Hillomyia Crosskey, 1973
  - Macrohoughiopsis Townsend, 1927
  - Maculosalia Mesnil, 1946
  - Metaphorocera Thompson, 1968
  - Neophryxe Townsend, 1916
  - Parasetigena Brauer & von Bergenstamm, 1891
  - Phorcidella Mesnil, 1946
  - Phorinia Robineau-Desvoidy, 1830
  - Phorocera Robineau-Desvoidy, 1830
  - Stomatotachina Townsend, 1931
  - Tachinomyia Townsend, 1892
- Tribe Goniini
  - Agaedioxenis Villeneuve, 1939
  - Allophorocera Hendel, 1901
  - Allosturmia Blanchard, 1958
  - Anamastax Brauer & von Bergenstamm, 1891
  - Andesimyia Brèthes, 1909
  - Aneogmena Brauer & von Bergenstamm, 1891
  - Antistaseopsis Townsend, 1934
  - Anurophylla Villeneuve, 1938
  - Aplomyodoria Townsend, 1928
  - Arama Richter, 1972
  - Araucogonia Cortés, 1976
  - Araucosimus Aldrich, 1934
  - Argyrophylax Brauer & von Bergenstamm, 1889
  - Arrhenomyza Malloch, 1929
  - Atacta Schiner, 1868
  - Atactopsis Townsend, 1917
  - Atactosturmia Townsend, 1915
  - Atractocerops Townsend, 1916
  - Baumhaueria Meigen, 1838
  - Belvosia Robineau-Desvoidy, 1830
  - Belvosiomimops Townsend, 1935
  - Blepharella Macquart, 1851
  - Blepharellina Mesnil, 1952
  - Blephariatacta Townsend, 1931
  - Blepharipa Rondani, 1856
  - Blepharopoda Rondani In Osculati, 1850
  - Botria Rondani, 1856
  - Bourquinia Blanchard, 1935
  - Brachicheta Rondani, 1861
  - Brachybelvosia Townsend, 1927
  - Brachychaetoides Mesnil, 1970
  - Brachycnephalia Townsend, 1927
  - Cadurcia Villeneuve, 1926
  - Caeniopsis Townsend, 1927
  - Caltagironea Cortés & Campos, 1974
  - Camptophryno Townsend, 1927
  - Carceliella Baranov, 1934
  - Ceratochaetops Mesnil, 1970
  - Ceromasia Rondani, 1856
  - Chaetocnephalia Townsend, 1915
  - Chaetocrania Townsend, 1915
  - Chaetocraniopsis Townsend, 1915
  - Chaetogaedia Brauer & von Bergenstamm, 1891
  - Chaetoglossa Townsend, 1892
  - Chaetophorocera Townsend, 1912
  - Chaetosturmia Villeneuve, 1915
  - Chlorolydella Townsend, 1933
  - Chloropales Mesnil, 1950
  - Choeteprosopa Macquart, 1851
  - Chrysoexorista Townsend, 1915
  - Chrysophryno Townsend, 1927
  - Chrysophryxe Sellers, 1943
  - Chrysotryphera Townsend, 1935
  - Clemelis Robineau-Desvoidy, 1863
  - Cnephalodes Townsend, 1911
  - Coscaronia Cortés, 1979
  - Crapivnicia Richter, 1995
  - Crosskeya Shima & Chao, 1988
  - Cubaemyiopsis Thompson, 1963
  - Cylindromasicera Townsend, 1915
  - Cyosoprocta Reinhard, 1952
  - Cyzenis Robineau-Desvoidy, 1863
  - Datvia Richter, 1972
  - Distichona Wulp, 1890
  - Dolichocnephalia Townsend, 1915
  - Dolichocolon Brauer & von Bergenstamm, 1889
  - Dolichogonia Townsend, 1915
  - Eleodiphaga Walton, 1918
  - Elodia Robineau-Desvoidy, 1863
  - Enchomyia Aldrich, 1934
  - Erynnia Robineau-Desvoidy, 1830
  - Erythrocera Robineau-Desvoidy, 1849
  - Euceromasia Townsend, 1912
  - Eucnephalia Townsend, 1892
  - Euexorista Townsend, 1912
  - Euloewiodoria Townsend, 1927
  - Eumea Robineau-Desvoidy, 1863
  - Eumeella Mesnil, 1939
  - Eurygastropsis Townsend, 1916
  - Eurysthaea Robineau-Desvoidy, 1863
  - Eurythemyia Reinhard, 1967
  - Frontina Meigen, 1838
  - Frontiniella Townsend, 1918
  - Frontocnephalia Townsend, 1916
  - Gaedia Meigen, 1838
  - Gaediophanopsis Blanchard, 1954
  - Gaediopsis Brauer & von Bergenstamm, 1891
  - Germariopsis Townsend, 1915
  - Gonia Meigen, 1803
  - Goniophthalmus Villeneuve, 1910
  - Gonistylum Macquart, 1851
  - Hapalioloemus Baranov, 1934
  - Harrisia Robineau-Desvoidy, 1830
  - Hebia Robineau-Desvoidy, 1830
  - Hesperomyia Brauer & von Bergenstamm, 1889
  - Houghia Coquillett, 1897
  - Hypertrophomma Townsend, 1915
  - Hyphantrophaga Townsend, 1892
  - Hystricephala Macquart, 1846
  - Igneomyia Mesnil, 1950
  - Isafarus Richter, 1976
  - Itacnephalia Townsend, 1927
  - Itasturmia Townsend, 1927
  - Kuwanimyia Townsend, 1916
  - Leschenaultia Robineau-Desvoidy, 1830
  - Lydellina Villeneuve, 1916
  - Macropatelloa Townsend, 1931
  - Manola Richter, 1982
  - Masicera Macquart, 1834
  - Masistyloides Mesnil, 1963
  - Masistylum Brauer & von Bergenstamm, 1893
  - Mayodistichona Townsend, 1928
  - Mendelssohnia Kugler, 1971
  - Mesnilius Özdikmen, 2006
  - Metopiopsis Vimmer & Soukup, 1940
  - Minthosoma Zeegers, 2007
  - Moreiria Townsend, 1932
  - Myatelemus Reinhard, 1967
  - Myiosturmiopsis Thompson, 1963
  - Mystacella Wulp, 1890
  - Myxarchiclops Villeneuve, 1916
  - Myxexoristops Townsend, 1911
  - Myxogaedia Mesnil, 1956
  - Myxophryxe Cerretti & O'Hara, 2016
  - Nealsomyia Mesnil, 1939
  - Neopodomyia Townsend, 1927
  - Ocytata Gistel, 1848
  - Onychogonia Brauer & von Bergenstamm, 1889
  - Opsosturmia Townsend, 1927
  - Oraphasmophaga Reinhard, 1958
  - Pachystylum Macquart, 1848
  - Pales Robineau-Desvoidy, 1830
  - Palesisa Villeneuve, 1929
  - Palia Curran, 1927
  - Paliana Curran, 1927
  - Palpozenillia Townsend, 1934
  - Paramesochaeta Brauer & von Bergenstamm, 1891
  - Parapexopsis Mesnil, 1953
  - Paraphasmophaga Townsend, 1915
  - Paravibrissina Shima, 1979
  - Patelloa Townsend, 1916
  - Peracroglossa Townsend, 1931
  - Perlucidina Mesnil, 1952
  - Pexopsis Brauer & von Bergenstamm, 1889
  - Phasiatacta Townsend, 1911
  - Phasmofrontina Townsend, 1931
  - Philocorus Cortés, 1976
  - Phryno Robineau-Desvoidy, 1830
  - Phrynotachina Townsend, 1927
  - Phyllaristomyia Townsend, 1931
  - Phytomypterina Van Emden, 1960
  - Pimelimyia Mesnil, 1949
  - Plagimasicera Townsend, 1915
  - Platymya Robineau-Desvoidy, 1830
  - Polychaeta Macquart, 1851
  - Proparachaeta Townsend, 1928
  - Proparachaetopsis Blanchard, 1942
  - Prosopea Rondani, 1861
  - Prosopodopsis Townsend, 1926
  - Prospherysa Wulp, 1890
  - Protogoniops Townsend, 1913
  - Protogoniopsis Townsend, 1915
  - Protypophaemyia Blanchard, 1963
  - Pseudalsomyia Mesnil, 1968
  - Pseudochaeta Coquillett, 1895
  - Pseudogonia Brauer & von Bergenstamm, 1889
  - Pseudosiphosturmia Thompson, 1966
  - Pterotopeza Townsend, 1908
  - Ptilogonia Bischof, 1904
  - Quadra Malloch, 1929
  - Ramonella Kugler, 1980
  - Rhacodinella Mesnil, 1968
  - Rhinomyodes Townsend, 1933
  - Rhynchogonia Brauer & von Bergenstamm, 1893
  - Ricosia Curran, 1927
  - Scaphimyia Mesnil, 1955
  - Schembria Rondani, 1861
  - Sericozenillia Mesnil, 1957
  - Simoma Aldrich, 1926
  - Spallanzania Robineau-Desvoidy, 1830
  - Stiremania Cerretti & O'Hara, 2016
  - Stolatosoma Reinhard, 1953
  - Sturmia Robineau-Desvoidy, 1830
  - Sturmiellina Thompson, 1963
  - Sturmimasiphya Townsend, 1935
  - Suensonomyia Mesnil, 1953
  - Synamphichaeta Villeneuve, 1936
  - Takanomyia Mesnil, 1957
  - Tasmaniomyia Townsend, 1916
  - Thelairosoma Villeneuve, 1916
  - Thelymorpha Brauer & von Bergenstamm, 1889
  - Thysanopsis Townsend, 1917
  - Torosomyia Reinhard, 1935
  - Trepophrys Townsend, 1908
  - Tritaxys Macquart, 1847
  - Trixomorpha Brauer & von Bergenstamm, 1889
  - Tunapunia Thompson, 1963
  - Ucayalimyia Townsend, 1927
  - Ugimeigenia Townsend, 1916
  - Vibrissovoria Townsend, 1919
  - Winthellia Crosskey, 1967
  - Zebromyia Malloch, 1929
  - Zenillia Robineau-Desvoidy, 1830
- Tribe Masiphyini
  - Alsopsyche Brauer & von Bergenstamm, 1891
  - Belvosiella Curran, 1934
  - Manteomasiphya Guimarães, 1966
  - Masiphya Brauer & von Bergenstamm, 1891
  - Masiphyoidea Thompson, 1963
  - Micromasiphya Townsend, 1934
  - Mystacomyia Giglio-Tos, 1893
  - Mystacomyoidea Thompson, 1963
  - Neomasiphya Guimarães, 1966
  - Oromasiphya Townsend, 1927
  - Paraphasiopsis Townsend, 1917
  - Prophasiopsis Townsend, 1927
  - Pseudomasiphya Thompson, 1963
  - Thelairophasia Townsend, 1919
- Tribe Thrixionini
  - Thrixion Brauer & von Berganstamm, 1889
- Tribe Winthemiini
  - Avibrissosturmia Townsend, 1927
  - Euwinthemia Blanchard, 1963
  - Fasslomyia Townsend, 1931
  - Hemisturmia Townsend, 1927
  - Nemorilla Rondani, 1856
  - Orasturmia Reinhard, 1947
  - Ossidingia Townsend, 1919
  - Rhaphiochaeta Brauer & von Bergenstamm, 1889
  - Smidtia Robineau-Desvoidy, 1830
  - Triodontopyga Townsend, 1927
  - Winthemia Robineau-Desvoidy, 1830
