= Pseudoredtenbacheria =

Scientific classification
- Kingdom: Animalia
- Phylum: Arthropoda
- Class: Insecta
- Order: Diptera
- Family: Tachinidae
- Subfamily: Exoristinae
- Tribe: Blondeliini
- Genus: Pseudoredtenbacheria; Brauer & von Bergenstamm, 1889

Type species
- Redtenbacheria brasiliensis Schiner, 1868

Synonyms
- Neommasicera Townsend, 1927; Oligolydella Townsend, 1927

Genus of flies

Pseudoredtenbacheria is a genus of parasitic flies in the family Tachinidae.

== Species ==
- Pseudoredtenbacheria brasiliensis (Schiner, 1868)
- Pseudoredtenbacheria fulvipennis (Wulp, 1890)
- Pseudoredtenbacheria succincta (Wulp, 1890)
