= Prospherysa =

Scientific classification
- Kingdom: Animalia
- Phylum: Arthropoda
- Class: Insecta
- Order: Diptera
- Family: Tachinidae
- Subfamily: Exoristinae
- Tribe: Goniini
- Genus: Prospherysa; Wulp, 1890

Type species
- Prospherysa aemulans Wulp, 1890

Synonyms
- Dexiophana Brauer & von Berganstamm, 1891; Epidexia Townsend, 1912; Sarcolydella Townsend, 1927

Genus of flies

Prospherysa is a genus of flies in the family Tachinidae.

== Species ==
- Prospherysa aemulans Wulp, 1890
- Prospherysa analis (Townsend, 1927)
- Prospherysa ingloria Wulp, 1890
- Prospherysa mimela (Reinhard, 1953)
- Prospherysa pulverea (Coquillett, 1897)
- Prospherysa subpilosa Wulp, 1890
