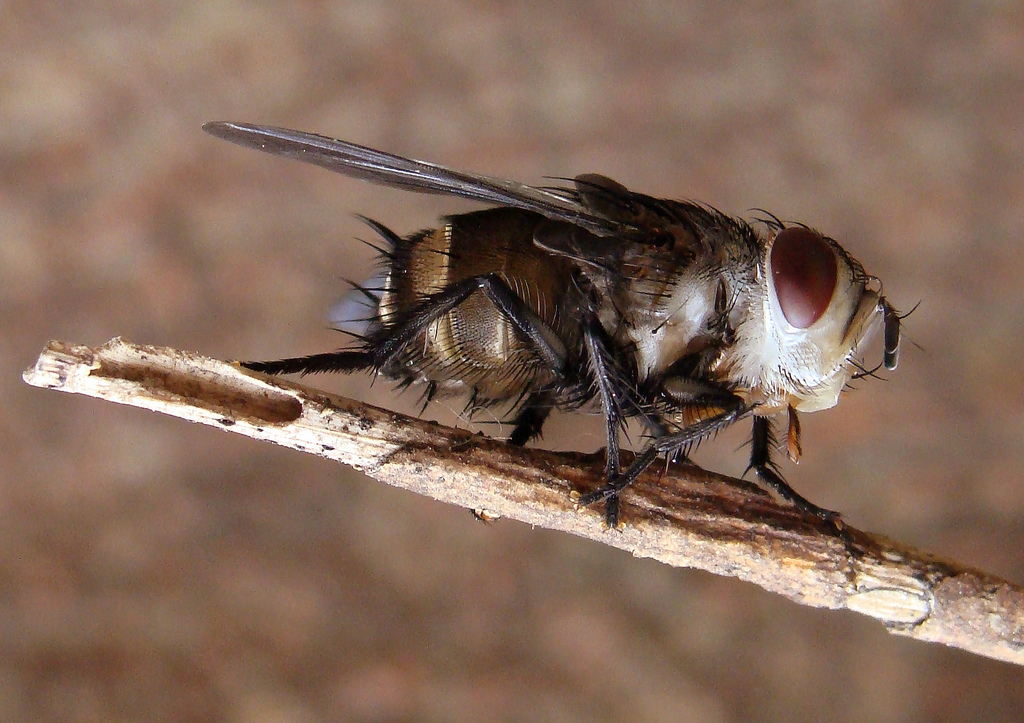
- Compsilura concinnata

Scientific classification
- Kingdom: Animalia
- Phylum: Arthropoda
- Class: Insecta
- Order: Diptera
- Family: Tachinidae
- Subfamily: Exoristinae
- Tribe: Blondeliini
- Genus: Compsiluroides; Bouché, 1834

Type species
- Tachina concinnata Meigen, 1824

Synonyms
- Doria Meigen, 1838; Machaera Mik, 1890; Machaereea Schiner, 1864; Machaira Brauer, 1889; Macherea Rondani, 1859

= Compsilura =

Genus of flies

Compsilura is a genus of flies in the family Tachinidae.

== Species ==
- Compsilura concinnata (Meigen, 1824)
- Compsilura lobata Tachi & Komagata, 2021
- Compsilura malayana Tachi & Shima, 2021
- Compsilura pauciseta Tachi & Huang, 2021
- Compsilura solitaria (Curran, 1940)
- Compsilura sumatrensis Townsend, 1926
