= Chaetogaedia =

Scientific classification
- Kingdom: Animalia
- Phylum: Arthropoda
- Class: Insecta
- Order: Diptera
- Family: Tachinidae
- Subfamily: Exoristinae
- Tribe: Goniini
- Genus: Chaetogaedia; Brauer & von Berganstamm, 1891

Type species
- Prospherysa vilis Wulp, 1890

Synonyms
- Eophrissopolia Townsend, 1926; Frontinogaedia Townsend, 1926; Gaediosturmia Blanchard, 1963; Phrissopolia Townsend, 1908

Genus of flies

Chaetogaedia is a genus of flies in the family Tachinidae.

== Species ==
- Chaetogaedia analis (Wulp, 1867)
- Chaetogaedia aurata Blanchard, 1963
- Chaetogaedia auricephala (Blanchard, 1963)
- Chaetogaedia crebra (Wulp, 1890)
- Chaetogaedia desertorum (Townsend, 1908)
- Chaetogaedia filialis (Reinhard, 1945)
- Chaetogaedia monticola (Bigot, 1887)
- Chaetogaedia ochricauda (Wulp, 1890)
- Chaetogaedia ochriceps (Wulp, 1892)
- Chaetogaedia rufifrons (Wulp, 1890)
- Chaetogaedia rufostylata (Bigot, 1887)
- Chaetogaedia tessellata (Giglio-Tos, 1893)
- Chaetogaedia townsendi Sabrosky & Arnaud, 1965
- Chaetogaedia vilis (Wulp, 1890)
