= Zaira (fly) =

Scientific classification
- Kingdom: Animalia
- Phylum: Arthropoda
- Class: Insecta
- Order: Diptera
- Family: Tachinidae
- Subfamily: Exoristinae
- Tribe: Blondeliini
- Genus: Zaira; Robineau-Desvoidy, 1830

Type species
- Zaira agrestis (= Tachina cinerea Fallén, 1810) Robineau-Desvoidy, 1830

Synonyms
- Fabricia Meigen, 1838; Sitophaga Gistel, 1848; Biomya Rondani, 1856; Viviania Rondani, 1861; Viviana Rondani, 1861; Phegea Robineau-Desvoidy, 1863; Biomyia Schiner, 1868; Pseudatractocera Townsend, 1892; Eubiomyia Townsend, 1916; Eubiomya O’Hara & Wood, 2004; Epimeigenia Townsend, 1931; Thematheca Reinhard, 1961; Nearchus Reinhard, 1964; Synorbitalia Thompson, 1968; Vivianoidea Thompson, 1968

Genus of flies

Zaira is a genus of parasitic flies in the family Tachinidae. Larvae are parasitoids of adult beetles.

== Species ==
- Zaira adscripta (Wulp, 1890)
- Zaira angustifrons (Reinhard, 1930)
- Zaira argentina (Townsend, 1931)
- Zaira arrisor (Reinhard, 1959)
- Zaira aurigera (Coquillett, 1895)
- Zaira calosomae (Townsend, 1916)
- Zaira cinerea (Fallén, 1810)
- Zaira duplaris (Reinhard, 1964)
- Zaira eleodivora (Walton, 1918)
- Zaira flavipes (Thompson, 1968)
- Zaira georgiae (Brauer & von Bergenstamm, 1891)
- Zaira grisea (Thompson, 1968)
- Zaira lateralis (Curran, 1925)
- Zaira leechi (Curran, 1932)
- Zaira medeola (Reinhard, 1961)
- Zaira mutabilis (Coquillett, 1904)
- Zaira neomexicana (Townsend, 1892)
- Zaira nocturnalis (Reinhard, 1930)
- Zaira nubecula (Wulp, 1890)
- Zaira robusta (Wulp, 1890)
- Zaira sordicolor (Townsend, 1891)
- Zaira sordida (Walker, 1853)
- Zaira sublucens (Wulp, 1890)
