= Anagonia =

Scientific classification
- Kingdom: Animalia
- Phylum: Arthropoda
- Class: Insecta
- Order: Diptera
- Family: Tachinidae
- Subfamily: Exoristinae
- Tribe: Blondeliini
- Genus: Anagonia; Brauer & von Bergenstamm, 1891

Type species
- Anagonia spylosioides Brauer & von Bergenstamm, 1891

Synonyms
- Acephana Townsend, 1916; Opsophana Townsend, 1916

Genus of flies

Anagonia is a genus of flies in the family Tachinidae.

== Species ==
- Anagonia anguliventris (Malloch, 1932)
- Anagonia angustifrons Colless, 2012
- Anagonia commoni Colless, 2012
- Anagonia conformis Colless, 2012
- Anagonia crosskeyi Colless, 2012
- Anagonia errator Colless, 2012
- Anagonia grisea (Malloch, 1930)
- Anagonia lasiophthalma (Malloch, 1934)
- Anagonia lateralis (Macquart, 1846)
- Anagonia latistylus Colless, 2012
- Anagonia loripes Colless, 2012
- Anagonia major (Malloch, 1930)
- Anagonia minor Colless, 2012
- Anagonia norrisi Colless, 2012
- Anagonia opaca (Malloch, 1930)
- Anagonia perplexa Colless, 2012
- Anagonia propinqua Colless, 2012
- Anagonia rufifacies (Macquart, 1847)
- Anagonia scutellata (Malloch, 1930)
- Anagonia similis Colless, 2012
- Anagonia teratostylus Colless, 2012
- Anagonia tillyardi (Malloch, 1934)
- Anagonia uptoni Colless, 2012
- Anagonia zentae Colless, 2012
