= Myiosturmiopsis =

Scientific classification
- Kingdom: Animalia
- Phylum: Arthropoda
- Class: Insecta
- Order: Diptera
- Family: Tachinidae
- Subfamily: Exoristinae
- Tribe: Goniini
- Genus: Myiosturmiopsis; Thompson, 1963

Type species
- Masicera abdominalis Wulp, 1890

Genus of flies

Myiosturmiopsis is a genus of flies in the family Tachinidae.

== Species ==
- Myiosturmiopsis abdominalis (Wulp, 1890)

== Distribution ==
Trinidad and Tobago, Mexico.
