= Opsomeigenia =

Scientific classification
- Kingdom: Animalia
- Phylum: Arthropoda
- Class: Insecta
- Order: Diptera
- Family: Tachinidae
- Subfamily: Exoristinae
- Tribe: Blondeliini
- Genus: Opsomeigenia; Townsend, 1919

Type species
- Hypostena pusilla Coquillett, 1895

Genus of flies

Opsomeigenia is a genus of parasitic flies in the family Tachinidae.

== Species ==
- Opsomeigenia aegrota (Wulp, 1890)
- Opsomeigenia flavipalpis (Reinhard, 1934)
- Opsomeigenia orientalis Yang, 1989
- Opsomeigenia pusilla (Coquillett, 1895)
