= Picconia (fly) =

- Picconia incurva

Scientific classification
- Kingdom: Animalia
- Phylum: Arthropoda
- Clade: Pancrustacea
- Class: Insecta
- Order: Diptera
- Family: Tachinidae
- Subfamily: Exoristinae
- Tribe: Blondeliini
- Genus: Picconia; Robineau-Desvoidy, 1863

Type species
- Picconia bipartita Robineau-Desvoidy, 1863

Synonyms
- Neaeropsis Brauer & von Bergenstamm, 1893; Gremlinotrophus Reinhard, 1943

Genus of flies

Riedelia is a genus of flies in the family Tachinidae.

== Species ==
- Picconia derisa (Reinhard, 1943)
- Picconia incurva (Zetterstedt, 1844)
- Picconia manca Herting, 1973
- Picconia tenuiseta (Herting, 1973)
