= Pseudoviviania =

Scientific classification
- Kingdom: Animalia
- Phylum: Arthropoda
- Class: Insecta
- Order: Diptera
- Family: Tachinidae
- Subfamily: Exoristinae
- Tribe: Blondeliini
- Genus: Pseudoviviania; Brauer & von Bergenstamm, 1891

Type species
- Pseudoviviania platypoda Brauer & von Bergenstamm, 1891

Genus of flies

Pseudoviviania is a genus of flies in the family Tachinidae.

== Species ==
- Pseudoviviania platypoda Brauer & von Bergenstamm, 1891

== Distribution ==
Venezuela.
