= Thelairodoriopsis =

Scientific classification
- Kingdom: Animalia
- Phylum: Arthropoda
- Class: Insecta
- Order: Diptera
- Family: Tachinidae
- Subfamily: Exoristinae
- Tribe: Blondeliini
- Genus: Thelairodoriopsis; Thompson, 1968

Type species
- Thelairodoriopsis maracasi Thompson, 1968

Genus of flies

Thelairodoriopsis is a genus of parasitic flies in the family Tachinidae.

== Species ==
- Thelairodoriopsis maracasi Thompson, 1968
- Thelairodoriopsis sobrina (Wulp, 1890)

== Distribution ==
Peru.
