= Paratrixa =

Scientific classification
- Kingdom: Animalia
- Phylum: Arthropoda
- Class: Insecta
- Order: Diptera
- Family: Tachinidae
- Subfamily: Exoristinae
- Tribe: Blondeliini
- Genus: Paratrixa; Brauer & von Bergenstamm, 1891

Type species
- Paratrixa polonica Brauer & von Bergenstamm, 1891

Synonyms
- Spiniabdomina Shi, 1991

Genus of flies

Paratrixa is a genus of flies in the family Tachinidae.

== Species ==
- Paratrixa aethiopica Mesnil, 1952
- Paratrixa flava (Shi, 1991)
- Paratrixa pallida Mesnil, 1963
- Paratrixa polonica Brauer & von Bergenstamm, 1891
- Paratrixa stammeri Mesnil, 1952
- Paratrixa takanoi Mesnil, 1970
