= Diglossocera =

Scientific classification
- Kingdom: Animalia
- Phylum: Arthropoda
- Class: Insecta
- Order: Diptera
- Family: Tachinidae
- Subfamily: Exoristinae
- Tribe: Eryciini
- Genus: Diglossocera; Wulp, 1895

Type species
- Diglossocera bifida Wulp, 1895

Genus of flies

Diglossocera is a genus of flies in the family Tachinidae.

== Species ==
- Diglossocera bifida van der Wulp, 1895

== Distribution ==
India, Indonesia.
