= Myiomintho =

Scientific classification
- Kingdom: Animalia
- Phylum: Arthropoda
- Class: Insecta
- Order: Diptera
- Family: Tachinidae
- Subfamily: Exoristinae
- Tribe: Blondeliini
- Genus: Myiomintho; Brauer & von Bergenstamm, 1889

Type species
- Myiomintho elata Brauer & von Bergenstamm, 1889

Genus of flies

Myiomintho is a genus of parasitic flies in the family Tachinidae.

== Species ==
- Myiomintho elata Brauer & von Bergenstamm, 1889

== Distribution ==
Venezuela.
