= Palilogia =

Palilogia may refer to:

- Urodexia, a genus of flies
- Epizeuxis, a rhetorical technique
