= Anoxynops =

Scientific classification
- Kingdom: Animalia
- Phylum: Arthropoda
- Class: Insecta
- Order: Diptera
- Family: Tachinidae
- Subfamily: Exoristinae
- Tribe: Blondeliini
- Genus: Anoxynops; Townsend, 1927

Type species
- Anoxynops conica Townsend, 1927

Synonyms
- Palilogia Reinhard, 1964

Genus of flies

Anoxynops is a genus of flies in the family Tachinidae.

== Species ==
- A. aldrichi (Curran, 1926)
- A. aurifrons Thompson, 1968
- A. conicus Townsend, 1927
- A. flavocalyptratus (Wulp, 1890)
