= Oxyaporia =

Scientific classification
- Kingdom: Animalia
- Phylum: Arthropoda
- Class: Insecta
- Order: Diptera
- Family: Tachinidae
- Subfamily: Exoristinae
- Tribe: Blondeliini
- Genus: Oxyaporia; Townsend, 1919

Type species
- Gymnostylia ornata Brauer & von Bergenstamm, 1889

Genus of flies

Oxyaporia is a genus of parasitic flies in the family Tachinidae.

== Species ==
- Oxyaporia argentina (Brèthes, 1922)
- Oxyaporia ornata (Brauer & von Bergenstamm, 1889)
