= Conogaster =

Scientific classification
- Kingdom: Animalia
- Phylum: Arthropoda
- Class: Insecta
- Order: Diptera
- Family: Tachinidae
- Subfamily: Exoristinae
- Tribe: Blondeliini
- Genus: Conogaster; Brauer & von Bergenstamm, 1891

Type species
- Viviania nubilis Brauer & von Bergenstamm, 1891

Synonyms
- Tachina pruinosa Meigen, 1824

Genus of flies

Conogaster is a genus of bristle flies in the family Tachinidae.

== Species ==
- Conogaster pruinosa (Meigen, 1824)

== Distribution ==
Turkmenistan, Czech Republic, Hungary, Romania, Slovakia, Ukraine, Andorra, Bulgaria, Croatia, Greece, Italy, Portugal, Spain, Austria, France, Switzerland, Mongolia, Russia, Transcaucasia.
