= Sphaerina =

Scientific classification
- Kingdom: Animalia
- Phylum: Arthropoda
- Clade: Pancrustacea
- Class: Insecta
- Order: Diptera
- Family: Tachinidae
- Subfamily: Exoristinae
- Tribe: Blondeliini
- Genus: Sphaerina; Wulp, 1890

Type species
- Sphaerina nitidula Wulp, 1890

Synonyms
- Calpodomyia Townsend, 1915; Proxynops Townsend, 1927; Gopaulia Thompson, 1968; Microtownsendia Curran, 1934

Genus of flies

Sphaerina is a genus of flies in the family Tachinidae.

== Species ==
- Sphaerina linearis (Townsend, 1915)
- Sphaerina nigrifrons (Thompson, 1968)
- Sphaerina nitens (Curran, 1934)
- Sphaerina nitidula Wulp, 1890
