= Hesperomyia =

Scientific classification
- Kingdom: Animalia
- Phylum: Arthropoda
- Class: Insecta
- Order: Diptera
- Family: Tachinidae
- Subfamily: Exoristinae
- Tribe: Goniini
- Genus: Hesperomyia; Brauer & von Berganstamm, 1889

Type species
- Hesperomyia erythrocera Brauer & von Berganstamm, 1889

Synonyms
- Oestroplagia Townsend, 1919

Genus of flies

Hesperomyia is a genus of flies in the family Tachinidae.

== Species ==
- Hesperomyia erythrocera Brauer & von Berganstamm, 1889
- Hesperomyia petiolata (Townsend, 1919)
