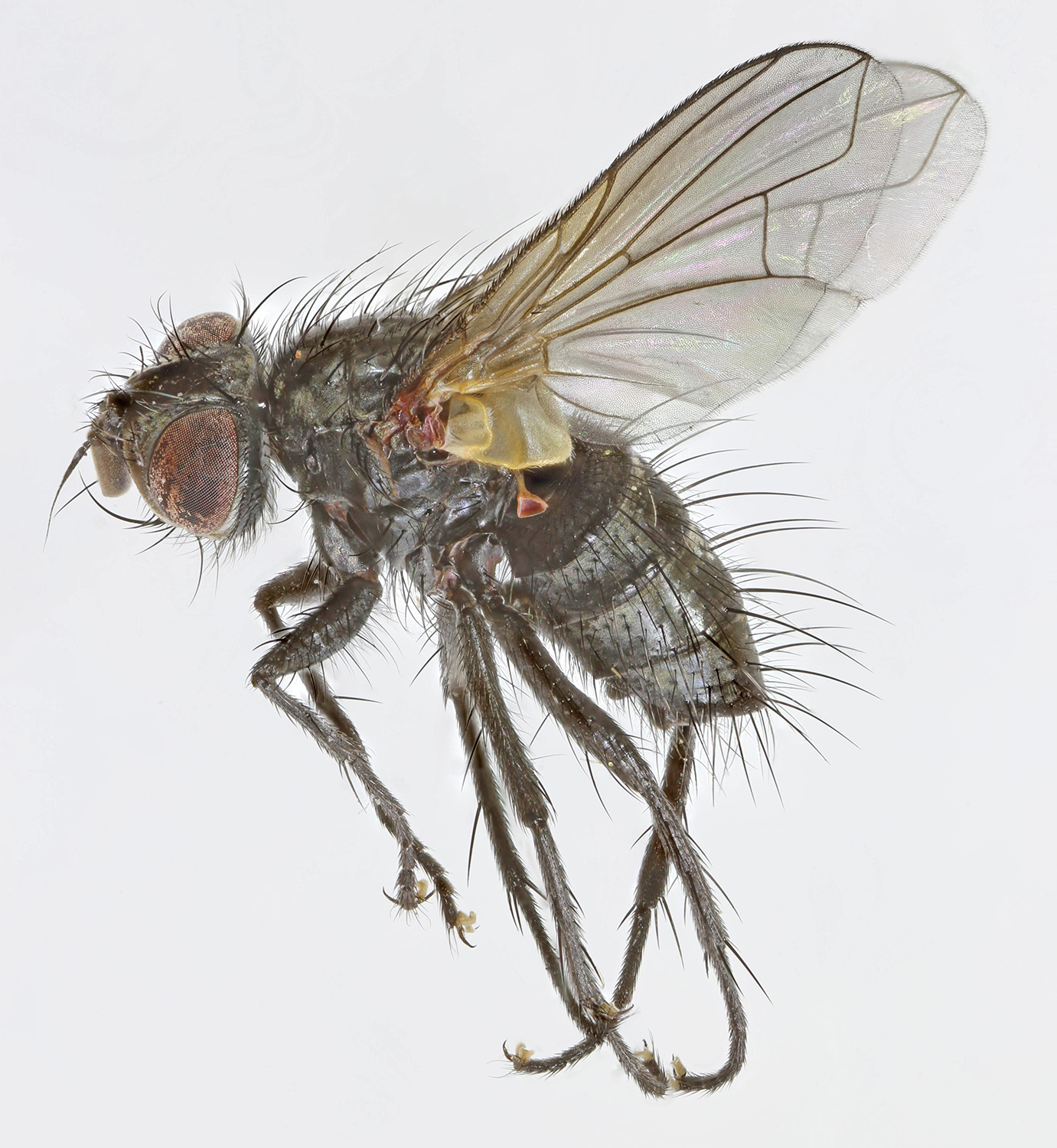
- Oswaldia muscaria

Scientific classification
- Kingdom: Animalia
- Phylum: Arthropoda
- Class: Insecta
- Order: Diptera
- Family: Tachinidae
- Subfamily: Exoristinae
- Tribe: Blondeliini
- Genus: Oswaldia; Robineau-Desvoidy, 1863

Type species
- Oswaldia muscaria Robineau-Desvoidy, 1863

Synonyms
- Hersilia Robineau-Desvoidy, 1863; Edomya Robineau-Desvoidy, 1863; Phaedima Robineau-Desvoidy, 1863; Erytaea Robineau-Desvoidy, 1863; Entomobosca Lioy, 1864; Dexodes Brauer & von Bergenstamm, 1889; Paradexodes Townsend, 1908; Eudexodes Townsend, 1908; Aubaeanetia Townsend, 1919; Parameigenia Townsend, 1919; Metatachina Townsend, 1919; Ablondelia Villeneuve, 1928

= Oswaldia =

Genus of flies

Oswaldia is a genus of flies in the family Tachinidae.

== Species ==
- Oswaldia albifacies (Townsend, 1908)
- Oswaldia anorbitalis (Brooks, 1945)
- Oswaldia apicalis (Mesnil, 1957)
- Oswaldia assimilis (Townsend, 1919)
- Oswaldia aurifrons (Townsend, 1908)
- Oswaldia conica (Reinhard, 1934)
- Oswaldia eggeri (Brauer & von Bergenstamm, 1889)
- Oswaldia flavitibia Shima, 1991
- Oswaldia gilva Shima, 1991
- Oswaldia glauca Shima, 1991
- Oswaldia hirsuta Mesnil, 1970
- Oswaldia illiberis Chao & Zhou, 1998
- Oswaldia immissa (Reinhard, 1959)
- Oswaldia intermedia Ziegler & Shima, 1996
- Oswaldia issikii (Baranov, 1935)
- Oswaldia minor (Curran, 1925)
- Oswaldia muscaria (Fallén, 1810)
- Oswaldia reducta (Villeneuve, 1930)
- Oswaldia sartura (Reinhard, 1959)
- Oswaldia spectabilis (Meigen, 1824)
- Oswaldia strigosa Shima, 1991
- Oswaldia valida (Curran, 1927)
