= Lecanipa =

Scientific classification
- Kingdom: Animalia
- Phylum: Arthropoda
- Class: Insecta
- Order: Diptera
- Family: Tachinidae
- Subfamily: Exoristinae
- Tribe: Blondeliini
- Genus: Lecanipa; Rondani, 1859

Type species
- Lecanipa patellifera Rondani, 1859

Synonyms
- Amphichaeta Brauer & von Bergenstamm, 1889; Lecanipus Brauer & von Bergenstamm, 1889; Amphichaetola Strand, 1928

Genus of flies

Lecanipa is a genus of flies in the family Tachinidae.

== Species ==
- Lecanipa bicincta (Meigen, 1824)
- Lecanipa leucomelas (Meigen, 1824)
