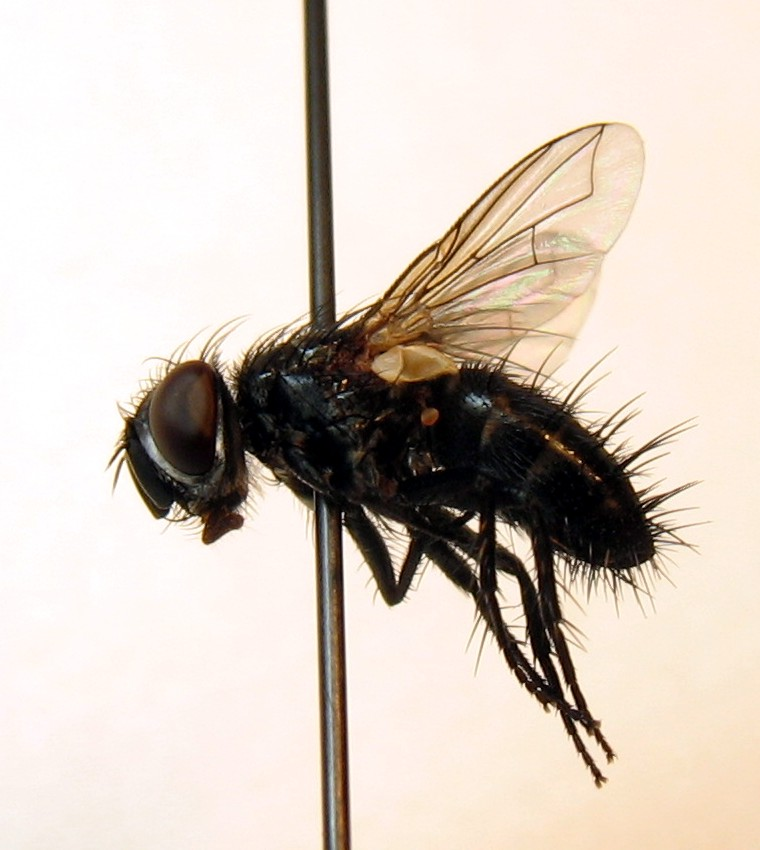

Scientific classification
- Kingdom: Animalia
- Phylum: Arthropoda
- Class: Insecta
- Order: Diptera
- Family: Tachinidae
- Subfamily: Exoristinae
- Tribe: Blondeliini
- Genus: Staurochaeta; Brauer & von Bergenstamm, 1889

Type species
- Baumhaueria gracilis Egger, 1861

= Staurochaeta =

Genus of flies

Staurochaeta is a genus of parasitic flies in the family Tachinidae.

== Species ==
- Staurochaeta albocingulata (Fallén, 1820)
- Staurochaeta grisea Mesnil, 1963
