= Dolichocolon (fly) =

Scientific classification
- Kingdom: Animalia
- Phylum: Arthropoda
- Class: Insecta
- Order: Diptera
- Family: Tachinidae
- Subfamily: Exoristinae
- Tribe: Goniini
- Genus: Dolichocolon; Brauer & von Berganstamm, 1889

Type species
- Dolichocolon paradoxum Brauer & von Berganstamm, 1889

Synonyms
- Eodolichocolon Townsend, 1933

Genus of flies

Dolichocolon is a genus of flies in the family Tachinidae.

== Species ==
- Dolichocolon africanum Mesnil, 1968
- Dolichocolon bequaerti Cerretti & Shima, 2011
- Dolichocolon caudatum Cerretti & Shima, 2011
- Dolichocolon crosskeyi Cerretti & Shima, 2011
- Dolichocolon elegans Cerretti & Shima, 2011
- Dolichocolon klapperichi Mesnil, 1968
- Dolichocolon meii Cerretti & Shima, 2011
- Dolichocolon mesnili Cerretti & Shima, 2011
- Dolichocolon orientale Townsend, 1927
- Dolichocolon paradoxum Brauer & von Berganstamm, 1889
- Dolichocolon paravicinium Cerretti & Shima, 2011
- Dolichocolon rude Cerretti & Shima, 2011
- Dolichocolon vicinum Mesnil, 1968
