= Trixomorpha =

Scientific classification
- Kingdom: Animalia
- Phylum: Arthropoda
- Class: Insecta
- Order: Diptera
- Family: Tachinidae
- Subfamily: Exoristinae
- Tribe: Goniini
- Genus: Trixomorpha; Brauer & von Bergenstamm, 1889

Type species
- Trixomorpha indica Brauer & von Bergenstamm, 1889

Genus of flies

Trixomorpha is a genus of flies in the family Tachinidae.

== Species ==
- Trixomorpha indica Brauer & von Bergenstamm, 1889
- Trixomorpha luteipennis Mesnil, 1950
- Trixomorpha tenebrosa (Walker, 1859)
