= Eribella =

Scientific classification
- Kingdom: Animalia
- Phylum: Arthropoda
- Clade: Pancrustacea
- Class: Insecta
- Order: Diptera
- Family: Tachinidae
- Subfamily: Exoristinae
- Tribe: Blondeliini
- Genus: Eribella; Mesnil, 1960

Type species
- Masicera polita Coquillett, 1902

Genus of flies

Eribella is a genus of flies in the family Tachinidae.

== Species ==
- Eribella exilis (Coquillett, 1897)
- Eribella nigrocostalis (Wulp, 1890)
- Eribella polita (Coquillett, 1902)
