= Prodegeeria =

Scientific classification
- Kingdom: Animalia
- Phylum: Arthropoda
- Class: Insecta
- Order: Diptera
- Family: Tachinidae
- Subfamily: Exoristinae
- Tribe: Blondeliini
- Genus: Prodegeeria; Brauer & von Bergenstamm, 1895

Type species
- Prodegeeria javana Brauer & von Bergenstamm, 1895

Synonyms
- Euthelairosoma Townsend, 1926; Hemidegeeria Villeneuve, 1929; Promedina Mesnil, 1957; Myxhypostena Villeneuve, 1939; Charasoma Reinhard, 1952

Genus of flies

Prodegeeria is a genus of flies in the family Tachinidae.

== Species ==
- Prodegeeria albicincta (Reinhard, 1924)
- Prodegeeria chaetopygialis (Townsend, 1926)
- Prodegeeria consobrina (Villeneuve, 1939)
- Prodegeeria gracilis Shima, 1979
- Prodegeeria japonica (Mesnil, 1957)
- Prodegeeria javana Brauer & von Bergenstamm, 1894
- Prodegeeria malayana Shima, 1997
- Prodegeeria pammelas (Reinhard, 1952)
- Prodegeeria residis (Reinhard, 1952)
- Prodegeeria straeleni Mesnil, 1952
- Prodegeeria tentata (Walker, 1858)
