= Rhynchogonia =

Scientific classification
- Kingdom: Animalia
- Phylum: Arthropoda
- Class: Insecta
- Order: Diptera
- Family: Tachinidae
- Subfamily: Exoristinae
- Tribe: Goniini
- Genus: Rhynchogonia; Brauer & von Berganstamm, 1893

Type species
- Rhynchogonia algerica Brauer & von Berganstamm, 1893

Genus of flies

Rhynchogonia is a genus of flies in the family Tachinidae.

== Species ==
- Rhynchogonia algerica Brauer & von Berganstamm, 1893

== Distribution ==
Turkmenistan, Israel, Algeria, Tunisia. United Arab Emirates.
