= Angustia =

Scientific classification
- Kingdom: Animalia
- Phylum: Arthropoda
- Class: Insecta
- Order: Diptera
- Family: Tachinidae
- Subfamily: Exoristinae
- Tribe: Blondeliini
- Genus: Angustia; Sellers, 1943

Type species
- Zenillia angustivitta Aldrich & Webber

Synonyms
- Trypheromyia Reinhard, 1945

Genus of flies

Angustia is a genus of flies in the family Tachinidae.

== Species ==
- A. angustivitta (Aldrich & Webber, 1924)
- A. pallens (Reinhard, 1945)
- A. pallidipalpis (Wulp, 1890)
