= Ptilodegeeria =

Scientific classification
- Kingdom: Animalia
- Phylum: Arthropoda
- Class: Insecta
- Order: Diptera
- Family: Tachinidae
- Subfamily: Exoristinae
- Tribe: Blondeliini
- Genus: Ptilodegeeria; Brauer & von Bergenstamm, 1891

Type species
- Ptilodegeeria lindigi Townsend, 1931

Genus of flies

Ptilodegeeria is a genus of flies in the family Tachinidae.

== Species ==
- Ptilodegeeria lindigi Townsend, 1931
- Ptilodegeeria umbrifera (Walker, 1853)
