= Lydinolydella =

Scientific classification
- Kingdom: Animalia
- Phylum: Arthropoda
- Class: Insecta
- Order: Diptera
- Family: Tachinidae
- Subfamily: Exoristinae
- Tribe: Blondeliini
- Genus: Lydinolydella; Townsend, 1927

Type species
- Lydinolydella metallica Townsend, 1927

Synonyms
- Myiodoria Townsend, 1927

Genus of flies

Lydinolydella is a genus of tachinid flies in the family Tachinidae.

== Species ==
- Lydinolydella abbreviata (Bigot, 1889)
- Lydinolydella discalis (Townsend, 1927)
- Lydinolydella metallica Townsend, 1927
- Lydinolydella humeralis (Wulp, 1890)
