= Leptostylum =

Scientific classification
- Kingdom: Animalia
- Phylum: Arthropoda
- Clade: Pancrustacea
- Class: Insecta
- Order: Diptera
- Family: Tachinidae
- Subfamily: Exoristinae
- Tribe: Blondeliini
- Genus: Leptostylum; Macquart, 1851

Type species
- Leptostylum pulchellum Macquart, 1851

Synonyms
- Argyreomyia Townsend, 1915; Anaphorinia Townsend, 1927; Thelairalia Curran, 1934; Anoxynopsoidea Thompson, 1968; Paranoxynops Thompson, 1968

Genus of flies

Leptostylum is a genus of flies in the family Tachinidae.

== Species ==
- Leptostylum aurata (Townsend, 1927)
- Leptostylum curepeiensis (Thompson, 1968)
- Leptostylum fasciatum (Curran, 1934)
- Leptostylum flavocalyptratum (Wulp, 1890)
- Leptostylum griseum (Thompson, 1968)
- Leptostylum itaquaquecetubae (Townsend, 1929)
- Leptostylum leuconotum (Wulp, 1892)
- Leptostylum oligothrix Gudin & Messas, 2018
- Leptostylum pulchellum Macquart, 1851
