= Paxiximyia =

Scientific classification
- Kingdom: Animalia
- Phylum: Arthropoda
- Class: Insecta
- Order: Diptera
- Family: Tachinidae
- Subfamily: Exoristinae
- Tribe: Blondeliini
- Genus: Paxiximyia; Toma & Olivier, 2018

Type species
- Paxiximyia sulmatogrossensis Toma & Olivier, 2018

Genus of flies

Paxiximyia is a genus of parasitic flies in the family Tachinidae.

== Species ==
- Paxiximyia sulmatogrossensis Toma & Olivier, 2018

== Distribution ==
Brazil.
