= Paracraspedothrix =

Scientific classification
- Kingdom: Animalia
- Phylum: Arthropoda
- Class: Insecta
- Order: Diptera
- Family: Tachinidae
- Subfamily: Exoristinae
- Tribe: Blondeliini
- Genus: Paracraspedothrix; Villeneuve, 1920

Type species
- Paracraspedothrix montivaga Villeneuve, 1920

Genus of flies

Paracraspedothrix is a genus of flies in the family Tachinidae.

== Species ==
- Paracraspedothrix angulicornis (Curran, 1930)
- Paracraspedothrix montivaga Villeneuve, 1920
