= Kiniatiliops =

Scientific classification
- Kingdom: Animalia
- Phylum: Arthropoda
- Class: Insecta
- Order: Diptera
- Family: Tachinidae
- Subfamily: Exoristinae
- Tribe: Blondeliini
- Genus: Kiniatiliops; Mesnil, 1955

Type species
- Kiniatiliops elegans Mesnil, 1955

Genus of flies

Kiniatiliops is a genus of parasitic flies in the family Tachinidae.

== Species ==
- Kiniatiliops nigrapex (Mesnil, 1952)
- Kiniatiliops trispina Mesnil, 1959
