= Policheta =

Scientific classification
- Kingdom: Animalia
- Phylum: Arthropoda
- Class: Insecta
- Order: Diptera
- Family: Tachinidae
- Subfamily: Exoristinae
- Tribe: Blondeliini
- Genus: Policheta; Rondani, 1856

Type species
- Tachina unicolor Fallén, 1820

Synonyms
- Pericheta Rondani, 1859; Polycheta Schiner, 1861; Polychaeta Schiner, 1868; Perichoeta Bezzi, 1894; Perichaeta Herting, 1984

Genus of flies

Policheta is a genus of flies in the family Tachinidae.

== Species ==
- Policheta crassispinosa Wood, 1985
- Policheta unicolor (Fallén, 1820)
