= Phasmophaga =

Scientific classification
- Kingdom: Animalia
- Phylum: Arthropoda
- Class: Insecta
- Order: Diptera
- Family: Tachinidae
- Subfamily: Exoristinae
- Tribe: Blondeliini
- Genus: Phasmophaga; Townsend, 1909

Type species
- Phasmophaga antennalis Townsend, 1909

Synonyms
- Phasmovora Cortés, 1968; Roeseliopsis Townsend, 1915

Genus of flies

Phasmophaga is a genus of parasitic flies in the family Tachinidae.

== Species ==
- Phasmophaga americana (Coquillett, 1897)
- Phasmophaga antennalis Townsend, 1909
- Phasmophaga floridensis (Greene, 1934)
- Phasmophaga meridionalis Townsend, 1909
- Phasmophaga phasmophagae (Cortés, 1968)
