= Prospherysodoria =

Scientific classification
- Kingdom: Animalia
- Phylum: Arthropoda
- Class: Insecta
- Order: Diptera
- Family: Tachinidae
- Subfamily: Exoristinae
- Tribe: Blondeliini
- Genus: Prospherysodoria; Townsend, 1928

Type species
- Prospherysodoria paraguayensis Townsend, 1928

Genus of flies

Prospherysodoria is a genus of tachinid flies in the family Tachinidae.

== Species ==
- Prospherysodoria paraguayensis Townsend, 1928

== Distribution ==
Paraguay.
