= Chaetolixophaga =

Scientific classification
- Kingdom: Animalia
- Phylum: Arthropoda
- Class: Insecta
- Order: Diptera
- Family: Tachinidae
- Subfamily: Exoristinae
- Tribe: Blondeliini
- Genus: Chaetolixophaga; Blanchard, 1940

Type species
- Chaetolixophaga laspeyresiae Blanchard, 1940

Genus of flies

Chaetolixophaga is a genus of flies in the family Tachinidae.

== Species ==
- Chaetolixophaga laspeyresiae Blanchard, 1940

== Distribution ==
Argentina.
