= Rioteria =

Scientific classification
- Kingdom: Animalia
- Phylum: Arthropoda
- Class: Insecta
- Order: Diptera
- Family: Tachinidae
- Subfamily: Exoristinae
- Tribe: Blondeliini
- Genus: Rioteria; Herting, 1973

Type species
- Rioteria submacula Herting, 1973

Genus of flies

Rioteria is a genus of parasitic flies in the family Tachinidae.

== Species ==
- Rioteria flava Zeegers, 2007
- Rioteria rufitibia (Mesnil, 1959)
- Rioteria submacula Herting, 1973
