= Pilimyia =

Scientific classification
- Kingdom: Animalia
- Phylum: Arthropoda
- Class: Insecta
- Order: Diptera
- Family: Tachinidae
- Subfamily: Exoristinae
- Tribe: Blondeliini
- Genus: Pilimyia; Malloch, 1930

Type species
- Pilimyia lasiophthalma Malloch, 1930

Genus of flies

Pilimyia is a genus of tachinid flies in the family Tachinidae.

== Species ==
- Pilimyia lasiophthalma Malloch, 1930
- Pilimyia lateralis (Macquart, 1846)
