= Anechuromyia =

Scientific classification
- Kingdom: Animalia
- Phylum: Arthropoda
- Class: Insecta
- Order: Diptera
- Family: Tachinidae
- Subfamily: Exoristinae
- Tribe: Blondeliini
- Genus: Anechuromyia; Mesnil & Shima, 1979

Type species
- Anechuromyia nigrescens Mesnil & Shima, 1979

Genus of flies

Anechuromyia is a genus of bristle flies in the family Tachinidae.

== Species ==
- Anechuromyia nigrescens Mesnil & Shima, 1979

== Distribution ==
Japan, Russia.
