= Miamimyia =

Scientific classification
- Kingdom: Animalia
- Phylum: Arthropoda
- Class: Insecta
- Order: Diptera
- Family: Tachinidae
- Subfamily: Exoristinae
- Tribe: Blondeliini
- Genus: Miamimyia; Townsend, 1916

Type species
- Miamimyia cincta Townsend, 1916

Genus of flies

Miamimyia is a genus of parasitic flies in the family Tachinidae.

== Species ==
- Miamimyia antennalis Guimarães, 1982
- Miamimyia cincta Townsend, 1916
- Miamimyia lopesi Guimarães, 1982
