= Dexodomintho =

Scientific classification
- Kingdom: Animalia
- Phylum: Arthropoda
- Class: Insecta
- Order: Diptera
- Family: Tachinidae
- Subfamily: Exoristinae
- Tribe: Blondeliini
- Genus: Dexodomintho; Townsend, 1935

Type species
- Dexodomintho fumipennis Townsend, 1935

Genus of flies

Dexodomintho is a genus of flies in the family Tachinidae.

== Species ==
- Dexodomintho fumipennis Townsend, 1935

== Distribution ==
Brazil.
