= Mauritiodoria =

Scientific classification
- Kingdom: Animalia
- Phylum: Arthropoda
- Class: Insecta
- Order: Diptera
- Family: Tachinidae
- Subfamily: Exoristinae
- Tribe: Blondeliini
- Genus: Mauritiodoria; Townsend, 1932

Type species
- Medoria spinicosta Thomson, 1869

Synonyms
- Gastroleptina Villeneuve, 1938

Genus of flies

Mauritiodoria is a genus of tachinid flies in the family Tachinidae.

== Species ==
- Mauritiodoria spinicosta (Thomson, 1869)

== Distribution ==
Mauritius, Réunion.
