= Lixadmontia =

Scientific classification
- Kingdom: Animalia
- Phylum: Arthropoda
- Class: Insecta
- Order: Diptera
- Family: Tachinidae
- Subfamily: Exoristinae
- Tribe: Blondeliini
- Genus: Lixadmontia; Wood & Cave, 2006

Type species
- Lixadmontia franki Wood & Cave, 2006

Genus of flies

Lixadmontia is a genus of tachinid flies in the family Tachinidae.

== Species ==
- Lixadmontia franki Wood & Cave, 2006

== Distribution ==
Guatemala, Honduras.
