= Euanisia =

Scientific classification
- Kingdom: Animalia
- Phylum: Arthropoda
- Class: Insecta
- Order: Diptera
- Family: Tachinidae
- Subfamily: Exoristinae
- Tribe: Blondeliini
- Genus: Euanisia; Blanchard, 1947

Type species
- Euanisia mesacarrioni Blanchard, 1947

Genus of flies

Euanisia is a genus of flies in the family Tachinidae.

== Species ==
- Euanisia mesacarrioni Blanchard, 1947

== Distribution ==
Argentina, Uruguay.
