= Miamimyiops =

Scientific classification
- Kingdom: Animalia
- Phylum: Arthropoda
- Class: Insecta
- Order: Diptera
- Family: Tachinidae
- Subfamily: Exoristinae
- Tribe: Blondeliini
- Genus: Miamimyiops; Townsend, 1939

Type species
- Miamimyiops mattoensis Townsend, 1939

Genus of flies

Miamimyiops is a genus of parasitic flies in the family Tachinidae.

== Species ==
- Miamimyiops mattoensis Townsend, 1939

== Distribution ==
Brazil.
