= Erynniola =

Scientific classification
- Kingdom: Animalia
- Phylum: Arthropoda
- Class: Insecta
- Order: Diptera
- Family: Tachinidae
- Subfamily: Exoristinae
- Tribe: Blondeliini
- Genus: Erynniola; Mesnil, 1977

Type species
- Erynniola atricolor Mesnil, 1977

Genus of flies

Erynniola is a genus of flies in the family Tachinidae.

== Species ==
- Erynniola atricolor Mesnil, 1977
- Erynniola russipes Mesnil, 1977
