= Chaetodoria =

Scientific classification
- Kingdom: Animalia
- Phylum: Arthropoda
- Class: Insecta
- Order: Diptera
- Family: Tachinidae
- Subfamily: Exoristinae
- Tribe: Blondeliini
- Genus: Chaetodoria; Townsend, 1927

Type species
- Chaetodoria conica Townsend, 1927

Genus of flies

Chaetodoria is a genus of tachinid flies in the family Tachinidae.

== Species ==
- Chaetodoria conica Townsend, 1927

== Distribution ==
Peru.
