= Microaporia =

Scientific classification
- Kingdom: Animalia
- Phylum: Arthropoda
- Class: Insecta
- Order: Diptera
- Family: Tachinidae
- Subfamily: Exoristinae
- Tribe: Blondeliini
- Genus: Microaporia; Townsend, 1919

Type species
- Microaporia elegans Townsend, 1919

Genus of flies

Microaporia is a genus of flies in the family Tachinidae.

== Species ==
- Microaporia elegans Townsend, 1919

== Distribution ==
Peru.
