= Zosteromeigenia =

Scientific classification
- Kingdom: Animalia
- Phylum: Arthropoda
- Class: Insecta
- Order: Diptera
- Family: Tachinidae
- Subfamily: Exoristinae
- Tribe: Blondeliini
- Genus: Zosteromeigenia (Townsend, 1919)
- Species: Z. mima

Binomial name
- Zosteromeigenia mima (Townsend, 1919)

Synonyms
- Zosteromyia longicornis (Hardy 1933)

Monotypic fly genus

Zosteromeigenia mima is a species of fly in the family Tachinidae and the sole representative of the genus Zosteromeigenia. Like the vast majority of tachinid flies, Z. mima is expected to be a parasitoid of other arthropods, likely the larvae of Lepidoptera, however few or no host records exist.

== Identification ==
Z. mima is morphologically similar to a number of other flies in the tribe Blondeliini, namely those in the genus Trigonospila. Like Trigonospila, Z. mima is distinctive for the alternating black and white transverse bars on the thorax. There are two whitish bars on the thorax; one adjacent to the transverse suture, and the second adjacent to the scutellum. There may also be a white triangle on the tip of the scutellum, and the subscutellum is usually white. Abdominal colouration distinguishes Z. mima from Trigonospila; the abdomen is largely brown or fulvous-yellow on the sides of the abdomen with a broad black stripe extending along the dorsal surface of the abdomen, terminating about the fourth segment.

Z. mima is also easily distinguished from Trigonospila by other characters, including a heavy suffusion of black or brown along the wing margin, giving the appearance of a brown stripe adjacent to the wing margin and much longer antennae.
