= Aesia =

Scientific classification
- Kingdom: Animalia
- Phylum: Arthropoda
- Clade: Pancrustacea
- Class: Insecta
- Order: Diptera
- Family: Tachinidae
- Subfamily: Exoristinae
- Tribe: Blondeliini
- Genus: Aesia; Richter, 2011

Type species
- Aesia acerbiana Richter, 2011

Genus of flies

Aesia is a genus of tachinid flies in the family Tachinidae.

== Species ==
- Aesia acerbiana Richter, 2011

== Distribution ==
Siberia.
