= Myiodoriops =

Scientific classification
- Kingdom: Animalia
- Phylum: Arthropoda
- Class: Insecta
- Order: Diptera
- Family: Tachinidae
- Subfamily: Exoristinae
- Tribe: Blondeliini
- Genus: Myiodoriops; Townsend, 1935

Type species
- Myiodoriops marginalis Townsend, 1935

Genus of flies

Myiodoriops is a genus of tachinid flies in the family Tachinidae.

== Species ==
- Myiodoriops marginalis Townsend, 1935

== Distribution ==
Trinidad and Tobago, Guyana.
