= Bampura =

Scientific classification
- Kingdom: Animalia
- Phylum: Arthropoda
- Class: Insecta
- Order: Diptera
- Family: Tachinidae
- Subfamily: Exoristinae
- Tribe: Blondeliini
- Genus: Bampura; Tschorsnig, 1983

Type species
- Bampura angustigena Tschorsnig, 1983

Genus of flies

Bampura is a genus of bristle flies in the family Tachinidae.

== Species ==
- Bampura angustigena Tschorsnig, 1983
- Bampura breviaristata Gilasian & Ziegler, 2019
- Bampura nudicosta (Mesnil, 1970)
