= Meigenia =

Scientific classification
- Kingdom: Animalia
- Phylum: Arthropoda
- Class: Insecta
- Order: Diptera
- Family: Tachinidae
- Subfamily: Exoristinae
- Tribe: Blondeliini
- Genus: Meigenia; Robineau-Desvoidy, 1830

Type species
- Meigenia cylindrica Robineau-Desvoidy, 1830

Synonyms
- Zenais Robineau-Desvoidy, 1830; Zaida Robineau-Desvoidy, 1830; Spylosia Rondani, 1859; Collatia Curran, 1934

Genus of flies

Meigenia is a genus of flies in the family Tachinidae.

== Species ==
- Meigenia bellina Mesnil, 1967
- Meigenia dorsalis (Meigen, 1824)
- Meigenia fuscisquama Liu & Zhang, 2007
- Meigenia grandigena (Pandellé, 1896)
- Meigenia incana (Fallén, 1810)
- Meigenia majuscula (Rondani, 1859)
- Meigenia mutabilis (Fallén, 1810)
- Meigenia nigra Chao & Sun, 1992
- Meigenia picta Mesnil, 1961
- Meigenia simplex Tschorsnig & Herting, 1998
- Meigenia submissa (Aldrich & Webber, 1924)
- Meigenia tridentata Mesnil, 1961
- Meigenia uncinata Mesnil, 1967
- Meigenia velutina Mesnil, 1952
