= Kiniatilla =

Scientific classification
- Kingdom: Animalia
- Phylum: Arthropoda
- Class: Insecta
- Order: Diptera
- Family: Tachinidae
- Subfamily: Exoristinae
- Tribe: Blondeliini
- Genus: Kiniatilla; Villeneuve, 1938

Type species
- Kiniatiliops elegans Villeneuve, 1938

Synonyms
- Kiniatila Villeneuve, 1938

Genus of flies

Kiniatilla is a genus of parasitic flies in the family Tachinidae.

== Species ==
- Kiniatilla brevipalpis Mesnil, 1952
- Kiniatilla tricincta Villeneuve, 1938
