= Meigenielloides =

Scientific classification
- Kingdom: Animalia
- Phylum: Arthropoda
- Class: Insecta
- Order: Diptera
- Family: Tachinidae
- Subfamily: Exoristinae
- Tribe: Blondeliini
- Genus: Meigenielloides; Townsend, 1919

Type species
- Meigenielloides cinerea Townsend, 1919

Synonyms
- Synoris Aldrich, 1926

Genus of flies

Meigenielloides is a genus of flies in the family Tachinidae.

== Species ==
- Meigenielloides cinerea Townsend, 1919

== Distribution ==
Mexico.
