= Balde (fly) =

Scientific classification
- Kingdom: Animalia
- Phylum: Arthropoda
- Clade: Pancrustacea
- Class: Insecta
- Order: Diptera
- Family: Tachinidae
- Subfamily: Exoristinae
- Tribe: Blondeliini
- Genus: Balde; Rice, 2005

Type species
- Balde striatum Rice, 2005

Genus of flies

Balde is a genus of tachinid flies in the family Tachinidae.

== Species ==
- Balde striatum Rice, 2005

== Distribution ==
Tasmania.
