= Medinomyia =

Scientific classification
- Kingdom: Animalia
- Phylum: Arthropoda
- Class: Insecta
- Order: Diptera
- Family: Tachinidae
- Subfamily: Exoristinae
- Tribe: Blondeliini
- Genus: Medinomyia; Mesnil 1957

Type species
- Medinomyia canescens Mesnil 1957

Genus of flies

Medinomyia is a genus of tachinid flies in the family Tachinidae.

== Distribution ==
Myanmar.

== Species ==
- Medinomyia canescens Mesnil, 1957.
