= Uromedina =

Scientific classification
- Kingdom: Animalia
- Phylum: Arthropoda
- Class: Insecta
- Order: Diptera
- Family: Tachinidae
- Subfamily: Exoristinae
- Tribe: Blondeliini
- Genus: Uromedina; Townsend, 1926

Type species
- Uromedina caudata Townsend, 1926

Synonyms
- Arrhinodexia Townsend, 1927

Genus of flies

Uromedina is a genus of flies in the family Tachinidae.

== Species ==
- Uromedina atrata (Townsend, 1927)
- Uromedina caudata Townsend, 1926
- Uromedina eumorphophaga (Baranov, 1934)
- Uromedina rufipes Shima, 1985
