= Lydellothelaira =

Scientific classification
- Kingdom: Animalia
- Phylum: Arthropoda
- Class: Insecta
- Order: Diptera
- Family: Tachinidae
- Subfamily: Exoristinae
- Tribe: Blondeliini
- Genus: Lydellothelaira; Townsend, 1919

Type species
- Lydellothelaira collaris Townsend, 1919

Genus of flies

Lydellothelaira is a genus of bristle flies in the family Tachinidae.

== Species ==
- Lydellothelaira collaris Townsend, 1919

== Distribution ==
Brazil, Peru.
