= Thelairochaetona =

Scientific classification
- Kingdom: Animalia
- Phylum: Arthropoda
- Class: Insecta
- Order: Diptera
- Family: Tachinidae
- Subfamily: Exoristinae
- Tribe: Blondeliini
- Genus: Thelairochaetona; Townsend, 1919

Type species
- Thelairochaetona thrix Townsend, 1919

Synonyms
- Thelairochaetoma Townsend, 1919

Genus of flies

Thelairochaetona is a genus of parasitic flies in the family Tachinidae.

== Species ==
- Thelairochaetona thrix Townsend, 1919

== Distribution ==
Panama
