= Medinospila =

Scientific classification
- Kingdom: Animalia
- Phylum: Arthropoda
- Class: Insecta
- Order: Diptera
- Family: Tachinidae
- Subfamily: Exoristinae
- Tribe: Blondeliini
- Genus: Medinospila; Mesnil, 1977

Type species
- Medinospila nigella Mesnil, 1977

Genus of flies

Medinospila is a genus of tachinid flies in the family Tachinidae from Madagascar.

== Species ==
- Medinospila nigella Mesnil, 1977

== Distribution ==
Madagascar
