= Thelyoxynops =

Scientific classification
- Kingdom: Animalia
- Phylum: Arthropoda
- Class: Insecta
- Order: Diptera
- Family: Tachinidae
- Subfamily: Exoristinae
- Tribe: Blondeliini
- Genus: Thelyoxynops; Townsend, 1927

Type species
- Thelyoxynops orbitalis Townsend, 1927

Synonyms
- Prophaenopsis Townsend, 1927; Maracasimyia Thompson, 1968

Genus of flies

Thelyoxynops is a genus of flies in the family Tachinidae.

== Species ==
- Thelyoxynops antennalis (Thompson, 1968)
- Thelyoxynops nitens (Townsend, 1927)
- Thelyoxynops orbitalis Townsend, 1927
