= Monoleptophaga =

Scientific classification
- Kingdom: Animalia
- Phylum: Arthropoda
- Clade: Pancrustacea
- Class: Insecta
- Order: Diptera
- Family: Tachinidae
- Subfamily: Exoristinae
- Tribe: Blondeliini
- Genus: Monoleptophaga; Baranov, 1938

Type species
- Monoleptophaga caldwelli Baranov, 1938

Genus of flies

Monoleptophaga is a genus of parasitic flies in the family Tachinidae.

== Species ==
- Monoleptophaga caldwelli Baranov, 1938

== Distribution ==
Australia.
