= Oxynops =

Scientific classification
- Kingdom: Animalia
- Phylum: Arthropoda
- Class: Insecta
- Order: Diptera
- Family: Tachinidae
- Subfamily: Exoristinae
- Tribe: Blondeliini
- Genus: Oxynops; Townsend, 1912

Type species
- Oxynops serratus Townsend, 1912

Synonyms
- Euchaetophleps Townsend, 1915; Elephantocera Townsend, 1916; Melanactia Townsend, 1927

Genus of flies

Oxynops is a genus of flies in the family Tachinidae.

== Species ==
- Oxynops anthracinus (Bigot, 1889)
- Oxynops macrocera (Townsend, 1927)
