= Ollachea =

Scientific classification
- Kingdom: Animalia
- Phylum: Arthropoda
- Class: Insecta
- Order: Diptera
- Family: Tachinidae
- Subfamily: Exoristinae
- Tribe: Blondeliini
- Genus: Ollachea; Townsend, 1919

Type species
- Ollachea elongata Townsend, 1919

Genus of flies

Ollachea is a genus of parasitic flies in the family Tachinidae.

== Species ==
- Ollachea elongata Townsend, 1919

== Distribution ==
Peru.
