= Paropsivora =

Scientific classification
- Kingdom: Animalia
- Phylum: Arthropoda
- Class: Insecta
- Order: Diptera
- Family: Tachinidae
- Subfamily: Exoristinae
- Tribe: Blondeliini
- Genus: Paropsivora; Malloch, 1934

Type species
- Paropsivora grisea Malloch, 1934

Genus of flies

Paropsivora is a genus of tachinid flies in the family Tachinidae.

== Species ==
- Paropsivora asiatica Shima, 1994
- Paropsivora australis (Macquart, 1847)
- Paropsivora graciliseta (Macquart, 1847)
- Paropsivora grisea Malloch, 1934
- Paropsivora tessellata (Macquart, 1846)
