= Erynniopsis =

Scientific classification
- Kingdom: Animalia
- Phylum: Arthropoda
- Class: Insecta
- Order: Diptera
- Family: Tachinidae
- Subfamily: Exoristinae
- Tribe: Blondeliini
- Genus: Erynniopsis; Townsend, 1926

Type species
- Erynniopsis rondanii Townsend, 1926

Synonyms
- Anachaetopsina Villeneuve, 1934

Genus of flies

Erynniopsis is a genus of flies in the family Tachinidae.

== Species ==
- Erynniopsis antennata (Rondani, 1861)

== Distribution ==
United States, Turkmenistan, Bulgaria, Italy, Serbia, Spain, France, Iran, Israel, Armenia.
