= Robinaldia =

Scientific classification
- Kingdom: Animalia
- Phylum: Arthropoda
- Class: Insecta
- Order: Diptera
- Family: Tachinidae
- Subfamily: Exoristinae
- Tribe: Blondeliini
- Genus: Robinaldia; Herting, 1983

Type species
- Picconia (Neaeropsis) angustata Herting, 1983

Genus of flies

Robinaldia is a genus of parasitic flies in the family Tachinidae.

== Species ==
- Robinaldia angustata Herting, 1983
