= Italydella =

Scientific classification
- Kingdom: Animalia
- Phylum: Arthropoda
- Class: Insecta
- Order: Diptera
- Family: Tachinidae
- Subfamily: Exoristinae
- Tribe: Blondeliini
- Genus: Italydella; Townsend, 1927

Type species
- Italydella geminata Townsend, 1927

Genus of flies

Italydella is a genus of flies in the family Tachinidae.

== Species ==
- Italydella chachapoyana Townsend, 1929
- Italydella geminata Townsend, 1927
