= Eomeigenielloides =

Scientific classification
- Kingdom: Animalia
- Phylum: Arthropoda
- Class: Insecta
- Order: Diptera
- Family: Tachinidae
- Subfamily: Exoristinae
- Tribe: Blondeliini
- Genus: Eomeigenielloides; Reinhard, 1975

Type species
- Eomeigenielloides segestris Reinhard, 1975

Genus of flies

Eomeigenielloides is a genus of flies in the family Tachinidae.

== Species ==
- Eomeigenielloides segestris Reinhard, 1975

== Distribution ==
Mexico.
