= Ophirion =

Scientific classification
- Kingdom: Animalia
- Phylum: Arthropoda
- Class: Insecta
- Order: Diptera
- Family: Tachinidae
- Subfamily: Exoristinae
- Tribe: Blondeliini
- Genus: Ophirion; Townsend, 1911

Type species
- Ophirion mirabile Townsend, 1911

Synonyms
- Eutrapelus Reinhard, 1974; Ophirionopsis Townsend, 1927; Opsoleskia Townsend, 1919; Oxyophirion Townsend, 1927; Telothyriosoma Townsend, 1919

Genus of flies

Ophirion is a genus of parasitic flies in the family Tachinidae. This species is a parasitoid of Polybia wasps.

== Species ==
- Ophirion atlixcoense (Reinhard, 1975)
- Ophirion brasiliensis (Townsend, 1927)
- Ophirion flava (Townsend, 1919)
- Ophirion lenkoi Gudin 2023
- Ophirion mirabile Townsend, 1911
- Ophirion polybia (Curran, 1937)
- Ophirion punctigerum (Townsend, 1927)
- Ophirion tersum (Townsend, 1919)
