= Tetrigimyia =

Scientific classification
- Kingdom: Animalia
- Phylum: Arthropoda
- Class: Insecta
- Order: Diptera
- Family: Tachinidae
- Subfamily: Exoristinae
- Tribe: Blondeliini
- Genus: Tetrigimyia; Shima & Takahashi, 2011

Type species
- Tetrigimyia minor Shima & Takahashi, 2011

Genus of flies

Tetrigimyia is a genus of tachinid flies in the family Tachinidae.

== Species ==
- Tetrigimyia minor Shima & Takahashi, 2011

== Distribution ==
Japan.
