= Hypoproxynops =

Scientific classification
- Kingdom: Animalia
- Phylum: Arthropoda
- Class: Insecta
- Order: Diptera
- Family: Tachinidae
- Subfamily: Exoristinae
- Tribe: Blondeliini
- Genus: Hypoproxynops; Townsend, 1927

Type species
- Hypoproxynops rufiventris Townsend, 1927

Genus of flies

Hypoproxynops is a genus of flies in the family Tachinidae. The scientific name of the genus was first published in 1927 by Charles Townsend.

== Species ==
- Hypoproxynops rufiventris Townsend, 1927

== Distribution ==
Brazil.
