= Ligeriella =

Scientific classification
- Kingdom: Animalia
- Phylum: Arthropoda
- Class: Insecta
- Order: Diptera
- Family: Tachinidae
- Subfamily: Exoristinae
- Tribe: Blondeliini
- Genus: Ligeriella; Mesnil, 1961

Type species
- Vibrissina aristata Villeneuve, 1911

Genus of flies

Ligeriella is a genus of flies in the family Tachinidae.

== Species ==
- Ligeriella aristata (Villeneuve, 1911)
- Ligeriella coxalis Shima, 1994
