= Erythroargyrops =

Scientific classification
- Kingdom: Animalia
- Phylum: Arthropoda
- Class: Insecta
- Order: Diptera
- Family: Tachinidae
- Subfamily: Exoristinae
- Tribe: Blondeliini
- Genus: Erythroargyrops; Townsend, 1917

Type species
- Erythroargyrops elegans Townsend, 1917

Genus of flies

Erythroargyrops is a genus of flies in the family Tachinidae.

== Species ==
- Erythroargyrops elegans Townsend, 1917

== Distribution ==
Peru.
