= Caenisomopsis =

Scientific classification
- Kingdom: Animalia
- Phylum: Arthropoda
- Class: Insecta
- Order: Diptera
- Family: Tachinidae
- Subfamily: Exoristinae
- Tribe: Blondeliini
- Genus: Caenisomopsis; Townsend, 1934

Type species
- Binghamimyia paraensis Townsend, 1934

Genus of flies

Caenisomopsis is a genus of tachinid flies in the family Tachinidae.

== Species ==
- Caenisomopsis paraensis Townsend, 1934

== Distribution ==
Brazil.
