= Binghamimyia =

Scientific classification
- Kingdom: Animalia
- Phylum: Arthropoda
- Clade: Pancrustacea
- Class: Insecta
- Order: Diptera
- Family: Tachinidae
- Subfamily: Exoristinae
- Tribe: Blondeliini
- Genus: Binghamimyia; Townsend, 1919

Type species
- Binghamimyia reclinata Townsend, 1919

Genus of flies

Binghamimyia is a genus of flies in the family Tachinidae.

== Species ==
- Binghamimyia reclinata Townsend, 1919

== Distribution ==
Peru.
