= Pelashyria =

Scientific classification
- Kingdom: Animalia
- Phylum: Arthropoda
- Class: Insecta
- Order: Diptera
- Family: Tachinidae
- Subfamily: Exoristinae
- Tribe: Blondeliini
- Genus: Pelashyria; Villeneuve, 1935

Type species
- Pelashyria grisescens Villeneuve, 1935

Genus of flies

Pelashyria is a genus of parasitic flies in the family Tachinidae.

== Species ==
- Pelashyria grisescens Villeneuve, 1935

== Distribution ==
Congo.
