= Drinomyia =

Scientific classification
- Kingdom: Animalia
- Phylum: Arthropoda
- Class: Insecta
- Order: Diptera
- Family: Tachinidae
- Subfamily: Exoristinae
- Tribe: Blondeliini
- Genus: Drinomyia; Mesnil, 1962

Type species
- Oswaldia bicoloripes Mesnil, 1962

Genus of flies

Drinomyia is a genus of flies in the family Tachinidae.

== Species ==
- Drinomyia hokkaidensis (Baranov, 1935)

== Distribution ==
China, Japan, South Korea, Russia.
