= Deltomyza =

Scientific classification
- Kingdom: Animalia
- Phylum: Arthropoda
- Clade: Pancrustacea
- Class: Insecta
- Order: Diptera
- Family: Tachinidae
- Subfamily: Exoristinae
- Tribe: Blondeliini
- Genus: Deltomyza; Malloch, 1931

Type species
- Delta australiensis Malloch, 1930

Synonyms
- Delta Malloch, 1930; Mallochiola Strand, 1932

Genus of flies

Deltomyza is a genus of flies in the family Tachinidae.

== Species ==
- Deltomyza australiensis (Malloch, 1930)

== Distribution ==
Australia.
