= Lindneriola =

Scientific classification
- Kingdom: Animalia
- Phylum: Arthropoda
- Class: Insecta
- Order: Diptera
- Family: Tachinidae
- Subfamily: Exoristinae
- Tribe: Blondeliini
- Genus: Lindneriola; Mesnil, 1959

Type species
- Lindneriola paradoxa Mesnil, 1959

Genus of flies

Lindneriola is a genus of parasitic flies in the family Tachinidae.

== Species ==
- Lindneriola paradoxa Mesnil, 1959

== Distribution ==
Tanzania.
