= Ictericodexia =

Scientific classification
- Kingdom: Animalia
- Phylum: Arthropoda
- Class: Insecta
- Order: Diptera
- Family: Tachinidae
- Subfamily: Exoristinae
- Tribe: Blondeliini
- Genus: Ictericodexia; Townsend, 1934

Type species
- Ictericodexia aristata Townsend, 1934

Genus of flies

Ictericodexia is a genus of parasitic flies in the family Tachinidae.

== Species ==
- Ictericodexia aristata Townsend, 1934

== Distribution ==
Brazil.
