= Melanoromintho =

Scientific classification
- Kingdom: Animalia
- Phylum: Arthropoda
- Class: Insecta
- Order: Diptera
- Family: Tachinidae
- Subfamily: Exoristinae
- Tribe: Blondeliini
- Genus: Melanoromintho; Townsend, 1935

Type species
- Melanorlopteryx barbiellinii Townsend, 1935

Genus of flies

Melanoromintho is a genus of tachinid flies in the family Tachinidae.

== Species ==
- Melanoromintho barbiellinii Townsend, 1935

== Distribution ==
Brazil.
