= Pareupogona =

Scientific classification
- Kingdom: Animalia
- Phylum: Arthropoda
- Clade: Pancrustacea
- Class: Insecta
- Order: Diptera
- Family: Tachinidae
- Subfamily: Exoristinae
- Tribe: Blondeliini
- Genus: Pareupogona; Townsend, 1916

Type species
- Pareupogona oblonga Townsend, 1916

Genus of flies

Pareupogona is a genus of parasitic flies in the family Tachinidae.

== Species ==
- Pareupogona oblonga Townsend, 1916

== Distribution ==
Australia.
