= Biomeigenia =

Scientific classification
- Kingdom: Animalia
- Phylum: Arthropoda
- Clade: Pancrustacea
- Class: Insecta
- Order: Diptera
- Family: Tachinidae
- Subfamily: Exoristinae
- Tribe: Blondeliini
- Genus: Biomeigenia; Mesnil, 1961

Type species
- Biomeigenia magna Mesnil, 1961

Genus of flies

Biomeigenia is a genus of flies in the family Tachinidae.

== Species ==
- Biomeigenia auripollinosa Chao & Liu, 1985
- Biomeigenia flava Chao, 1964
- Biomeigenia gynandromima Mesnil, 1961
- Biomeigenia magna Mesnil, 1961
