= Neophasmophaga =

Scientific classification
- Kingdom: Animalia
- Phylum: Arthropoda
- Class: Insecta
- Order: Diptera
- Family: Tachinidae
- Subfamily: Exoristinae
- Tribe: Blondeliini
- Genus: Neophasmophaga; Guimarães, 1982

Type species
- Neophasmophaga teixeirai Guimarães, 1982

Genus of flies

Neophasmophaga is a genus of parasitic flies in the family Tachinidae.

== Species ==
- Neophasmophaga teixeirai Guimarães, 1982
