= Notomanes =

Scientific classification
- Kingdom: Animalia
- Phylum: Arthropoda
- Class: Insecta
- Order: Diptera
- Family: Tachinidae
- Subfamily: Exoristinae
- Tribe: Blondeliini
- Genus: Notomanes; Aldrich, 1934

Type species
- Tachina basalis Walker, 1836

Genus of flies

Notomanes is a genus of tachinid flies in the family Tachinidae.

== Species ==
- Notomanes basalis (Walker, 1836)

== Distribution ==
Chile.
