= Tettigoniophaga =

Scientific classification
- Kingdom: Animalia
- Phylum: Arthropoda
- Class: Insecta
- Order: Diptera
- Family: Tachinidae
- Subfamily: Exoristinae
- Tribe: Blondeliini
- Genus: Tettigoniophaga; Guimarães, 1978

Type species
- Tettigoniophaga vanini Guimarães, 1978

Genus of flies

Tettigoniophaga is a genus of tachinid flies in the family Tachinidae.

== Species ==
- Tettigoniophaga vanini Guimarães, 1978

== Distribution ==
Brazil.
