= Enrogalia =

Scientific classification
- Kingdom: Animalia
- Phylum: Arthropoda
- Class: Insecta
- Order: Diptera
- Family: Tachinidae
- Subfamily: Exoristinae
- Tribe: Blondeliini
- Genus: Enrogalia; Reinhard, 1964

Type species
- Enrogalia morigera Reinhard, 1964

Genus of flies

Enrogalia is a genus of flies in the family Tachinidae.

== Species ==
- Enrogalia morigera Reinhard, 1964

== Distribution ==
California.
