= Lomachantha =

Scientific classification
- Kingdom: Animalia
- Phylum: Arthropoda
- Class: Insecta
- Order: Diptera
- Family: Tachinidae
- Subfamily: Exoristinae
- Tribe: Blondeliini
- Genus: Lomachantha; Rondani, 1859

Type species
- Lomachantha parra Rondani, 1859

Genus of flies

Lomachantha is a genus of parasitic flies in the family Tachinidae.

== Species ==
- Lomachantha parra Rondani, 1859
- Lomachantha rufitarsis Villeneuve, 1912
