= Parapoliops =

Scientific classification
- Kingdom: Animalia
- Phylum: Arthropoda
- Class: Insecta
- Order: Diptera
- Family: Tachinidae
- Subfamily: Exoristinae
- Tribe: Blondeliini
- Genus: Parapoliops; Blanchard, 1957

Type species
- Parapoliops grioti Blanchard, 1957

Genus of flies

Parapoliops is a genus of parasitic flies in the family Tachinidae.

== Species ==
- Parapoliops grioti Blanchard, 1957

== Distribution ==
Argentina.
