= Anomalostomyia =

Scientific classification
- Kingdom: Animalia
- Phylum: Arthropoda
- Class: Insecta
- Order: Diptera
- Family: Tachinidae
- Subfamily: Exoristinae
- Tribe: Blondeliini
- Genus: Anomalostomyia; Cerretti & Barraclough, 2007

Type species
- Anomalostomyia acerbiana Cerretti & Barraclough, 2007

Genus of flies

Anomalostomyia is a genus of tachinid flies in the family Tachinidae.

== Species ==
- Anomalostomyia namibica Cerretti & Barraclough, 2007

== Distribution ==
Namibia.
