= Pseudorrhinactia =

Scientific classification
- Kingdom: Animalia
- Phylum: Arthropoda
- Class: Insecta
- Order: Diptera
- Family: Tachinidae
- Subfamily: Exoristinae
- Tribe: Blondeliini
- Genus: Pseudorrhinactia; Thompson, 1968

Type species
- Pseudorrhinactia rubricornis Thompson, 1968

Genus of flies

Pseudorrhinactia is a genus of tachinid flies in the family Tachinidae.

== Species ==
- Pseudorrhinactia rubricornis Thompson, 1968

== Distribution ==
Trinidad and Tobago.
