= Croesoactia =

Scientific classification
- Kingdom: Animalia
- Phylum: Arthropoda
- Class: Insecta
- Order: Diptera
- Family: Tachinidae
- Subfamily: Exoristinae
- Tribe: Blondeliini
- Genus: Croesoactia; Townsend, 1927

Type species
- Croesoactia cincta Townsend, 1927

Genus of flies

Croesoactia cincta is a species of fly in the family Tachinidae.

== Species ==
- Croesoactia cincta Townsend, 1927

== Distribution ==
Peru.
