= Phytorophaga =

Scientific classification
- Kingdom: Animalia
- Phylum: Arthropoda
- Clade: Pancrustacea
- Class: Insecta
- Order: Diptera
- Family: Tachinidae
- Subfamily: Exoristinae
- Tribe: Blondeliini
- Genus: Phytorophaga; Bezzi, 1923

Type species
- Phytorophaga ventralis Bezzi, 1923

Synonyms
- Malayomedina Townsend, 1926

Genus of flies

Phytorophaga is a genus of flies in the family Tachinidae.

== Species ==
- Phytorophaga nigriventris Mesnil, 1942
- Phytorophaga petiolata (Townsend, 1926)
- Phytorophaga ventralis Bezzi, 1923
