= Uroeuantha =

Scientific classification
- Kingdom: Animalia
- Phylum: Arthropoda
- Class: Insecta
- Order: Diptera
- Family: Tachinidae
- Subfamily: Exoristinae
- Tribe: Blondeliini
- Genus: Uroeuantha; Townsend, 1927

Type species
- Uroeuantha longipes Townsend, 1927

Genus of flies

Uroeuantha is a genus of parasitic flies in the family Tachinidae.

== Species ==
- Uroeuantha longipes Townsend, 1927

== Distribution ==
Philippines.
