= Protaporia =

Scientific classification
- Kingdom: Animalia
- Phylum: Arthropoda
- Clade: Pancrustacea
- Class: Insecta
- Order: Diptera
- Family: Tachinidae
- Subfamily: Exoristinae
- Tribe: Blondeliini
- Genus: Protaporia; Townsend, 1919

Type species
- Protaporia galerucae Townsend, 1919

Genus of flies

Protaporia is a genus of tachinid flies in the family Tachinidae.

== Species ==
- Protaporia galerucae Townsend, 1919

== Distribution ==
Australia.
