= Dolichotarsina =

Scientific classification
- Kingdom: Animalia
- Phylum: Arthropoda
- Class: Insecta
- Order: Diptera
- Family: Tachinidae
- Subfamily: Exoristinae
- Tribe: Blondeliini
- Genus: Dolichotarsina; Mesnil, 1977

Type species
- Dolichotarsina gracilis Mesnil, 1977

Genus of flies

Dolichotarsina is a genus of flies in the family Tachinidae.

== Species ==
- Dolichotarsina gracilis Mesnil, 1977

== Distribution ==
Madagascar.
