= Pararondania =

Scientific classification
- Kingdom: Animalia
- Phylum: Arthropoda
- Class: Insecta
- Order: Diptera
- Family: Tachinidae
- Subfamily: Exoristinae
- Tribe: Blondeliini
- Genus: Pararondania; Villeneuve, 1916

Type species
- Pararondania multipunctata Villeneuve, 1916

Genus of flies

Pararondania is a genus of flies in the family Tachinidae.

== Species ==
- Pararondania multipunctata Villeneuve, 1916

== Distribution ==
South Africa.
