= Anametopochaeta =

Scientific classification
- Kingdom: Animalia
- Phylum: Arthropoda
- Class: Insecta
- Order: Diptera
- Family: Tachinidae
- Subfamily: Exoristinae
- Tribe: Blondeliini
- Genus: Anametopochaeta; Townsend, 1919

Type species
- Anametopochaeta olindoides Townsend, 1919

Genus of flies

Anametopochaeta is a genus of bristle flies in the family Tachinidae.

== Species ==
- Anametopochaeta olindoides Townsend, 1919

== Distribution ==
Peru.
