= Medinodexia =

Scientific classification
- Kingdom: Animalia
- Phylum: Arthropoda
- Class: Insecta
- Order: Diptera
- Family: Tachinidae
- Subfamily: Exoristinae
- Tribe: Blondeliini
- Genus: Medinodexia; Townsend, 1927

Type species
- Medinodexia fulviventris Townsend, 1927

Genus of flies

Medinodexia is a genus of tachinid flies in the family Tachinidae.

== Species ==
- M. exigua Shima, 1979
- M. fulviventris Townsend, 1927
- M. japonica Tachi & Huang, 2019
- M. morgani (Hardy, 1934)
- M. orientalis Shima, 1979
