= Dolichotarsus =

Scientific classification
- Kingdom: Animalia
- Phylum: Arthropoda
- Class: Insecta
- Order: Diptera
- Family: Tachinidae
- Subfamily: Exoristinae
- Tribe: Blondeliini
- Genus: Dolichotarsus; Brooks, 1945

Type species
- Dolichotarsus kingi Brooks, 1945

Genus of flies

Dolichotarsus is a genus of flies in the family Tachinidae.

== Species ==
- D. griseus Brooks, 1945
- D. kingi Brooks, 1945
- D. livescens Reinhard, 1958
- D. stipatus Reinhard, 1958
