= Trichinochaeta =

Scientific classification
- Kingdom: Animalia
- Phylum: Arthropoda
- Class: Insecta
- Order: Diptera
- Family: Tachinidae
- Subfamily: Exoristinae
- Tribe: Blondeliini
- Genus: Trichinochaeta; Townsend, 19217

Type species
- Trichinochaeta orbitalis Townsend, 1917

Genus of flies

Trichinochaeta is a genus of parasitic flies in the family Tachinidae.

== Species ==
- Trichinochaeta orbitalis Townsend, 1917

== Distribution ==
Brazil.
