= Latiginella =

Scientific classification
- Kingdom: Animalia
- Phylum: Arthropoda
- Class: Insecta
- Order: Diptera
- Family: Tachinidae
- Subfamily: Exoristinae
- Tribe: Blondeliini
- Genus: Latiginella; Villeneuve, 1936

Type species
- Latiginella rufogrisea Villeneuve, 1936

Genus of flies

Latiginella is a genus of parasitic flies in the family Tachinidae.

== Species ==
- Latiginella handeni Verbeke, 1963
- Latiginella rufogrisea Villeneuve, 1936
