= Afrolixa =

Scientific classification
- Kingdom: Animalia
- Phylum: Arthropoda
- Class: Insecta
- Order: Diptera
- Family: Tachinidae
- Subfamily: Exoristinae
- Tribe: Blondeliini
- Genus: Afrolixa; Curran, 1939

Type species
- Afrolixa macula Curran, 1939

Genus of flies

Afrolixa is a genus of flies in the family Tachinidae from Mozambique, Malawi and South Africa.

== Species ==
- Afrolixa macula Curran, 1939

== Distribution ==
Malawi, Mozambique, South Africa.
