= Zenargomyia =

Scientific classification
- Kingdom: Animalia
- Phylum: Arthropoda
- Clade: Pancrustacea
- Class: Insecta
- Order: Diptera
- Family: Tachinidae
- Subfamily: Exoristinae
- Tribe: Blondeliini
- Genus: Zenargomyia; Crosskey, 1964

Type species
- Zenargomyia moorei Crosskey, 1964

Genus of flies

Zenargomyia is a genus of tachinid flies in the family Tachinidae from New South Wales. It is a parasite on the Cypress Pine Sawfly Zenarge turneri.

== Species ==
- Zenargomyia moorei Crosskey, 1964
