= Rhinomyodes =

Scientific classification
- Kingdom: Animalia
- Phylum: Arthropoda
- Class: Insecta
- Order: Diptera
- Family: Tachinidae
- Subfamily: Exoristinae
- Tribe: Goniini
- Genus: Rhinomyodes; Townsend, 1933

Type species
- Rhinomyodes emporomyioides Townsend, 1933

Synonyms
- Rhinomydes Townsend, 1933; Rhinomyiodes Mesnil, 1953

Genus of flies

Rhinomyodes is a genus of flies in the family Tachinidae.

== Species ==
- Rhinomyodes emporomyioides Townsend, 1933

== Distribution ==
India, Japan, Taiwan.
