= Kallisomyia =

Scientific classification
- Kingdom: Animalia
- Phylum: Arthropoda
- Class: Insecta
- Order: Diptera
- Family: Tachinidae
- Subfamily: Exoristinae
- Tribe: Blondeliini
- Genus: Kallisomyia; Borisova-Zinovjeva, 1964

Type species
- Kallisomyia stackelbergi Borisova-Zinovjeva, 1964

Genus of flies

Kallisomyia is a genus of parasitic flies in the family Tachinidae.

== Species ==
- Kallisomyia stackelbergi Borisova-Zinovjeva, 1964

== Distribution ==
China, Russia.
