= Prosuccingulum =

Scientific classification
- Kingdom: Animalia
- Phylum: Arthropoda
- Class: Insecta
- Order: Diptera
- Family: Tachinidae
- Subfamily: Exoristinae
- Tribe: Blondeliini
- Genus: Prosuccingulum; Mesnil, 1959

Type species
- Prosuccingulum aberrans Mesnil, 1959

Genus of flies

Prosuccingulum is a genus of parasitic flies in the family Tachinidae.

== Species ==
- Prosuccingulum aberrans Mesnil, 1959

== Distribution ==
Tanzania.
