= Melanorlopteryx =

Scientific classification
- Kingdom: Animalia
- Phylum: Arthropoda
- Class: Insecta
- Order: Diptera
- Family: Tachinidae
- Subfamily: Exoristinae
- Tribe: Blondeliini
- Genus: Melanorlopteryx; Townsend, 1927

Type species
- Melanorlopteryx costalis Townsend, 1927

Genus of flies

Melanorlopteryx is a genus of parasitic flies in the family Tachinidae.

== Species ==
- Melanorlopteryx costalis Townsend, 1927

== Distribution ==
Peru
