= Minthopsis =

Scientific classification
- Kingdom: Animalia
- Phylum: Arthropoda
- Clade: Pancrustacea
- Class: Insecta
- Order: Diptera
- Family: Tachinidae
- Subfamily: Exoristinae
- Tribe: Blondeliini
- Genus: Minthopsis; Townsend, 1915

Type species
- Minthopsis vittata Townsend, 1915

Genus of flies

Minthopsis is a genus of parasitic flies in the family Tachinidae.

== Species ==
- Minthopsis vittata Townsend, 1915

== Distribution ==
Peru.
