= Urodexia =

Scientific classification
- Kingdom: Animalia
- Phylum: Arthropoda
- Class: Insecta
- Order: Diptera
- Family: Tachinidae
- Subfamily: Exoristinae
- Tribe: Blondeliini
- Genus: Urodexia; Osten Sacken, 1882

Type species
- Urodexia penicillum Osten Sacken, 1882

Synonyms
- Palilogia Reinhard, 1964

Genus of flies

Urodexia is a genus of flies in the family Tachinidae.

== Species ==
- Urodexia penicillum Osten Sacken, 1882
- Urodexia uramyoides (Townsend, 1927)
