= Succingulodes =

Scientific classification
- Kingdom: Animalia
- Phylum: Arthropoda
- Class: Insecta
- Order: Diptera
- Superfamily: Oestroidea
- Family: Tachinidae
- Genus: Succingulodes; Townsend, 1935

Type species
- Succingulodes elodioides Townsend, 1935

Genus of flies

Succingulodes is a genus of tachinid flies in the family Tachinidae.

== Species ==
- Succingulodes elodioides Townsend, 1935

== Distribution ==
Guyana.
