= Peter Friedrich Bouché =

German botanist and entomologist

Peter Friedrich Bouché (15 February 1785, in Berlin – 3 April 1856, in Berlin) was a German botanist and entomologist. His collection is in the German Entomological Institute.
