= Frederik Maurits van der Wulp =

Dutch entomologist

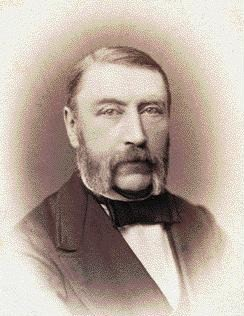
Frederik Maurits van der Wulp

Frederik Maurits van der Wulp (13 December 1818, The Hague – 27 November 1899, The Hague) was a Dutch entomologist mainly interested in Diptera.

He was a civil servant in the Dutch Audit Office.

His collection is divided between Natura Artis Magistra in Amsterdam and Rijksmuseum van Natuurlijke Historie in Leiden.

Frederik van der Wulp was a Member of the Netherlands Entomological Society.

== Works ==
- with Samuel Constantinus Snellen van Vollenhoven the first checklist entirely devoted to Dutch Diptera in the following parts
- Wulp, F.M. van der, & S.C. Snellen van Vollenhoven, 1852. Naamlijst van inlandsche Diptera. I. In: Bouwstoffen voor eene fauna van Nederland Deel 1 (J.A. Herklots, ed.): 138–153. E.J. Brill, Leiden.
- Wulp, F.M. van der & S.C. Snellen van Vollenhoven, 1853. Naamlijst van inlandsche Diptera. II. In: Bouwstoffen voor eene fauna van Nederland Deel 1. (J.A. Herklots (ed.): 188–206, E.J. Brill, Leiden.
- Wulp, F.M. van der, & S.C. Snellen van Vollenhoven, 1856. Naamlijst van inlandsche Diptera. III. In: Bouwstoffen voor eene fauna van Nederland. Deel 2. (J.A. Herklots, ed.): 89-117. E.J. Brill, Leiden.
- 1877 Diptera Neerlandica : de tweevleugelige insecten van Nederland 'S Gravenhage : Martinus Nijhoff online
- 1888-1903. Diptera Volume 2 in Biologia Centrali-Americana. Insecta. London, Quaritch.online
- 1896 Catalogue of the described Diptera from South Asia. The Hague, M. Nijhoff online
