= Julius von Bergenstamm =

Austrian entomologist

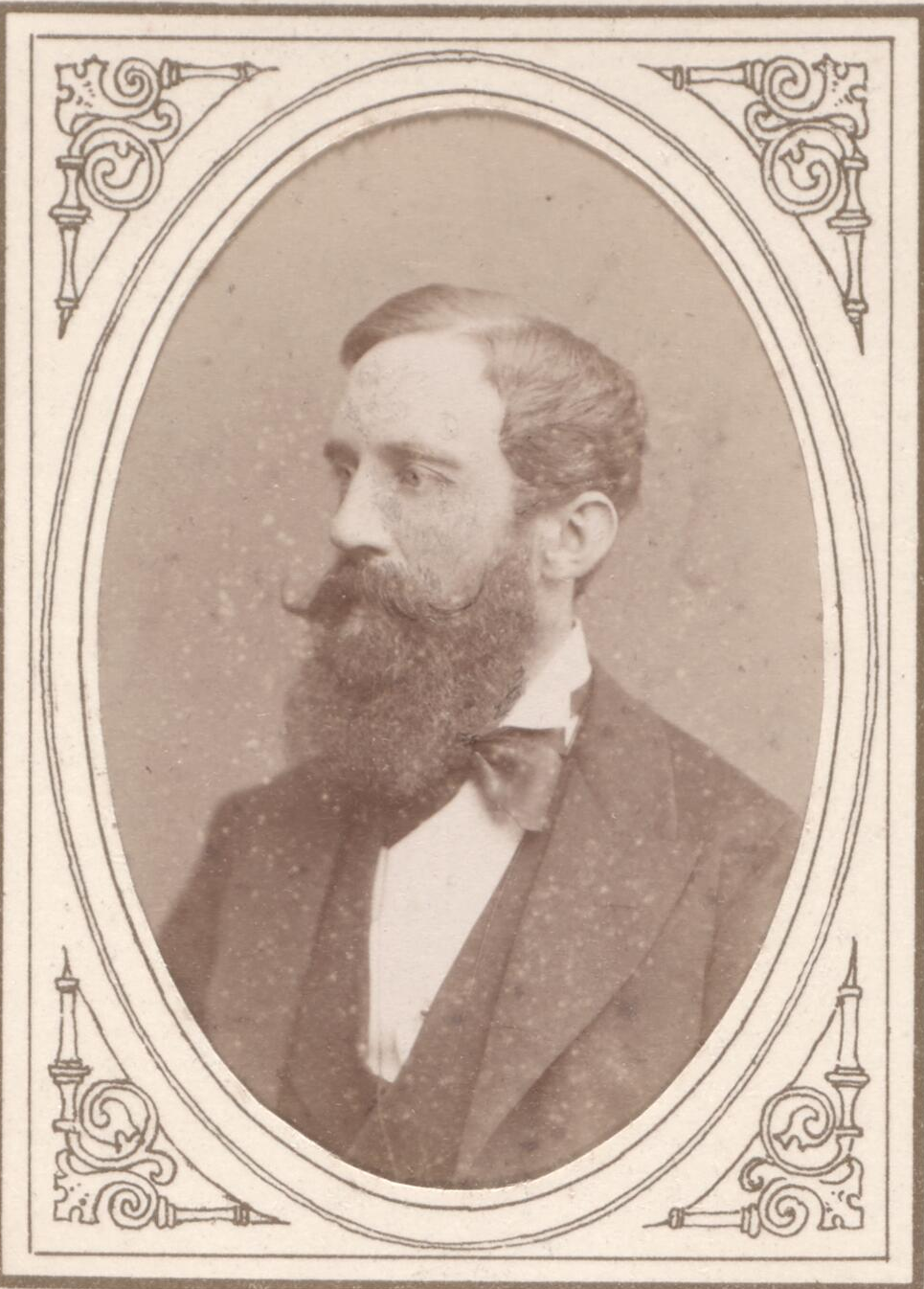
Julius von Bergenstamm, in 1876

Julius Edler von Bergenstamm (1837 (or 1838) – 31 January 1896, Vienna) was an Austrian entomologist who specialised in Diptera. He worked alongside Friedrich Moritz Brauer the Director of the Naturhistorisches Hofmuseum, Vienna.

== Selected works ==
- Brauer, F. & J.E. von Bergenstamm 1889. Die Zweiflügler des Kaiserlichen Museums zu Wien. IV. Vorarbeiten zu einer Monographie der Muscaria Schizometopa (exclusive Anthomyidae). Pars I. Denkschr. Akad. Wiss. Wien 56: 69–180. Also published separately in Wien, 1889, 112 p.
- Brauer, F & J.E. von Bergenstamm 1891. Die Zweiflügler des Kaiserlichen Museums zu Wien. V. Vorarbeiten zu einer Monographie der Muscaria Schizometopa (exclusive Anthomyidae). Pars II. Denkschr. Akad. Wiss. Wien 58: 305–446. Also published separately in Wien, 1891, 142 p.]
- Brauer, F & J.E. von Bergenstamm 1893. Die Zweiflügler des Kaiserlichen Museums zu Wien. VI. Vorarbeiten zu einer Monographie der Muscaria Schizometopa (exclusive Anthomyidae). Pars III. F. Tempsky, Wien . 152 p. Also published in journal form, 1894, Denkschr. Akad. Wiss. Wien 60: 89-240.]
- Brauer, F & J.E. von Bergenstamm [1895]. Die Zweiflügler des Kaiserlichen Museums zu Wien. VII. Vorarbeiten zu einer Monographie der Muscaria Schizometopa (exclusive Anthomyidae). Pars IV. Wien. Also published in journal form, 1895, Denkschr. Akad. Wiss. Wien 61: 537–624.]

Bergenstamms collection is in the Naturhistorisches Museum in Vienna.
