= List of Sobarocephala species =

Genus of flies

This is a list of 109 species in Sobarocephala, a genus of flies in the family Clusiidae.

== Sobarocephala species ==
- Sobarocephala affinis (Johnson, 1913)^{i c g}
- Sobarocephala albitarsis Czerny, 1929^{c g}
- Sobarocephala albiventris Soos, 1962^{c g}
- Sobarocephala albomaculata Soos, 1965^{c g}
- Sobarocephala annulata Melander & Argo, 1924^{c g}
- Sobarocephala anonymos ^{g}
- Sobarocephala apoxys ^{g}
- Sobarocephala atricornis Sabrosky, 1974^{i c g b}
- Sobarocephala atrifacies Sabrosky, 1974^{i c g}
- Sobarocephala baculigera Sasakawa^{g}
- Sobarocephala beckeri Hennig, 1956^{c g}
- Sobarocephala bistrigata Kertesz, 1903^{c g}
- Sobarocephala bivittata Melander & Argo, 1924^{c g}
- Sobarocephala boliviana Soos, 1963^{c g}
- Sobarocephala brasiliensis Soos, 1965^{c g}
- Sobarocephala columbiensis Soos, 1962^{c g}
- Sobarocephala cruciger Sabrosky, 1974^{i c g b}
- Sobarocephala cycla ^{g}
- Sobarocephala discolor Soos, 1964^{c g}
- Sobarocephala distincta Soos, 1965^{c g}
- Sobarocephala diversa Soos, 1965^{c g}
- Sobarocephala diversipes Curran, 1939^{c g}
- Sobarocephala dives Czerny, 1929^{c g}
- Sobarocephala dorsata Czerny, 1903^{c g}
- Sobarocephala doryphoros ^{g}
- Sobarocephala dreisbachi Sabrosky, 1974^{i c g}
- Sobarocephala dudichi Soos, 1963^{c g}
- Sobarocephala elegans Czerny, 1929^{c g}
- Sobarocephala eurystylis Sasakawa^{g}
- Sobarocephala fascipennis Melander, 1924^{c g}
- Sobarocephala ferruginea Czerny, 1903^{c g}
- Sobarocephala festiva Czerny, 1929^{c g}
- Sobarocephala finnilaei Frey, 1918^{c g}
- Sobarocephala flava Melander & Argo, 1924^{i c g b}
- Sobarocephala flaviseta (Johnson, 1913)^{i c g b}
- Sobarocephala fumipennis Soos, 1963^{c g}
- Sobarocephala fuscifacies Sasakawa^{g}
- Sobarocephala geniculata Sasakawa^{g}
- Sobarocephala guianica Curran, 1934^{c g}
- Sobarocephala hirsutiseta Frey^{g}
- Sobarocephala humeralis Melander & Argo, 1924^{c g}
- Sobarocephala hypopygialis Melander & Argo, 1924^{c g}
- Sobarocephala imitans Curran, 1934^{c g}
- Sobarocephala insolata ^{g}
- Sobarocephala interrupta Sabrosky, 1974^{i c g b}
- Sobarocephala isla Curran, 1939^{c g}
- Sobarocephala kapnikos ^{g}
- Sobarocephala lachnosternum Melander & Argo, 1924^{i c g b}
- Sobarocephala lanei Curran, 1939^{c g}
- Sobarocephala laticrinis ^{g}
- Sobarocephala latifacies Sabrosky & Steyskal, 1974^{i c g b}
- Sobarocephala latifrons (Loew, 1860)^{i c g b}
- Sobarocephala latipennis Melander & Argo, 1924^{c g}
- Sobarocephala latipennoides Soos, 1965^{c g}
- Sobarocephala liturata Melander & Argo, 1924^{c g}
- Sobarocephala lumbalis Williston, 1896^{c g}
- Sobarocephala macalpinei Soos, 1964^{c g}
- Sobarocephala magna ^{g}
- Sobarocephala medinai Steyskal, 1973^{c g}
- Sobarocephala megastylis Sasakawa^{g}
- Sobarocephala melanderi Soos, 1965^{c g}
- Sobarocephala melanopyga Czerny, 1929^{c g}
- Sobarocephala milangensis Stuckenberg, 1973^{c g}
- Sobarocephala mitsuii Sasakawa, 1995^{c g}
- Sobarocephala muesebecki Sabrosky, 1974^{i c g}
- Sobarocephala myllolabis ^{g}
- Sobarocephala nebulosa ^{g}
- Sobarocephala nepalensis Sasakawa, 1979^{c g}
- Sobarocephala nigroantennata Soos, 1962^{c g}
- Sobarocephala nigrofacies Soos, 1962^{c g}
- Sobarocephala nigrohumeralis Curran, 1928^{c g}
- Sobarocephala nigronota Melander & Argo, 1924^{c g}
- Sobarocephala nimbipennis ^{g}
- Sobarocephala orientalis ^{g}
- Sobarocephala paksana ^{g}
- Sobarocephala pallidor Steyskal, 1973^{c g}
- Sobarocephala panamaensis Soos, 1965^{c g}
- Sobarocephala pengellyi Lonsdale & Marshall, 2007^{c g}
- Sobarocephala peruana Soos, 1965^{c g}
- Sobarocephala picta Hennig, 1938^{c g}
- Sobarocephala pictipennis Kertesz, 1903^{c g}
- Sobarocephala plumata Melander & Argo, 1924^{c g}
- Sobarocephala plumatella Melander & Argo, 1924^{c g}
- Sobarocephala plumicornis Lamb, 1914^{c g}
- Sobarocephala pruinosa Soos, 1962^{c g}
- Sobarocephala quadrimaculata Soos, 1963^{i c g b}
- Sobarocephala quadrivittata Czerny, 1929^{c g}
- Sobarocephala recava ^{g}
- Sobarocephala reducta Soos, 1965^{c g}
- Sobarocephala ruebsaameni Czerny, 1903^{c g}
- Sobarocephala sabroskyi Soos, 1963^{c g}
- Sobarocephala secaperas ^{g}
- Sobarocephala setipes Melander & Argo, 1924^{i c g b}
- Sobarocephala sexvittata Soos, 1964^{c g}
- Sobarocephala soosi Steyskal, 1973^{c g}
- Sobarocephala steyskali Soos, 1963^{c g}
- Sobarocephala strigata Hennig, 1938^{c g}
- Sobarocephala subfasciata Curran, 1939^{c g}
- Sobarocephala texensis Sabrosky, 1974^{i c g}
- Sobarocephala triangula ^{g}
- Sobarocephala uncinata Sueyoshi, 2006^{c g}
- Sobarocephala valida Williston, 1896^{c g}
- Sobarocephala variegata Melander & Argo, 1924^{c g}
- Sobarocephala vittatifrons Hennig, 1938^{c g}
- Sobarocephala vockerothi Sasakawa, 1993^{c g}
- Sobarocephala wirthi Lonsdale & Marshall, 2007^{c g}
- Sobarocephala xanthomelana Melander & Argo, 1924^{c g}
- Sobarocephala zeugma Hennig, 1938^{c g}
- Sobarocephala zuluensis Stuckenberg, 1973^{c g}

Data sources: i = ITIS, c = Catalogue of Life, g = GBIF, b = Bugguide.net
