= Amnon Freidberg =

Israeli entomologist (1945–2020)

Amnon Freidberg אמנון פרידברג
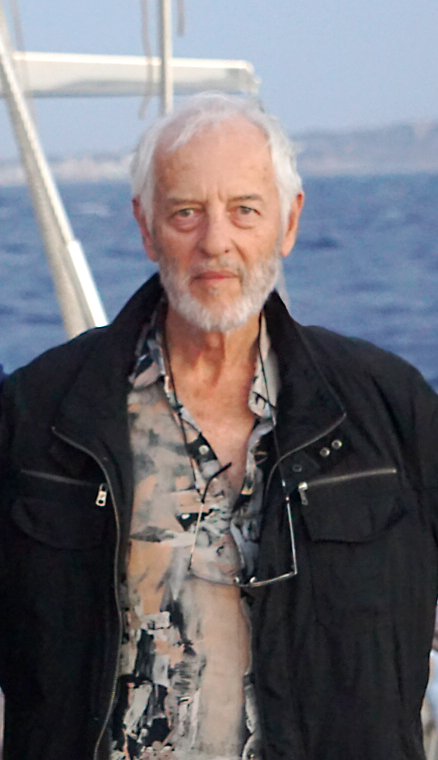
- Born: 18 September 1945; Haifa, British Mandate for Palestine
- Died: 10 October 2020 (age 75); Tel Aviv, Israel

Amnon Freidberg (Hebrew: אמנון פרידברג; 18 September 1945 – 10 October 2020) was an Israeli entomologist. In his career he described 257 new insect taxa, predominantly flies.

== Biography ==
Freidberg was born in 1945 in Haifa. He studied biology in Tel Aviv University and worked with Professor Jehoshua Kugler in taxonomic and faunistic research. In 1971, he completed his MSc thesis on fruit flies of Israel (Tephritidae), and in 1978 his PhD dissertation on the reproductive behavior and reproductive isolation in fruit‑flies.

Freidberg was chief editor of the Israel Journal of Entomology for nearly two decades (1982–1986, 1990–1998, 2005–2012).

He was curator of the entomological collection of Tel Aviv University until his retirement in 2013.

On October 10, 2020, Freidberg died from COVID-19 during the COVID-19 pandemic in Israel.

== Taxa named in his honor ==
- Amnonia Kugler, 1971
- Liriomyza freidbergi Spencer, 1974
- Nemotelus freidbergi Lindner, 1975
- Anacroce freidbergi Holzel, 1975
- Thereva freidbergi Lyneborg, 1976
- Solter freidbergi Holzel, 1980
- Dioctria freidbergi Theodor, 1980
- Scenopinus freidbergi Kelsey, 1981
- Morgea freidbergi McAlpine, 1981
- Setacera freidbergi Mathis, 1982
- Periclista freidbergi Smith, 1982
- Tricimba freidbergi Dely-Draskovitz, 1983
- Panimerus freidbergi Wagner, 1984
- Timiodacus freidbergi Munro, 1984
- Tipula (Lunatipula) freidbergi Theowald & Oosterbroek, 1986
- Levitinia freidbergi Beaucournu-Saguez & Braverman, 1987
- Sepsis freidbergi Ozerov, 1987
- Pegoplata freidbergi Michelsen, 1989
- Trypoxylon freidbergi Antropov, 1989
- Bagdasar amnonius Argaman, 1990
- Gonaporus freidbergi Wolf, 1990
- Sapromyza freidbergi Yarom, 1990
- Synolcus amnoni Londt, 1990
- Amnonthomyza Rohácek, 1993
- Neurotexis freidbergi McAlpine, 1993
- Anastrepha freidbergi Norrbom, 1993
- Aberdareleria freidbergi Woznica, 1993
- Dasyrhicnoessa freidbergi Munari, 1994
- Dicroptycha freidbergi Starý, 1994
- Xenoplatyura freidbergi Chandler, 1994
- Pachybrachis freidbergi Lopatin, 1994
- Strongylophthalmyia freidbergi Shatalkin, 1995
- Brachythoracosepsis freidbergi Ozerov, 1995
- Tommasvariella freidbergi De Meyer, 1995
- Geron freidbergi Zaitzev, 1996
- Afrocamilla freidbergi Barraclough, 1997
- Cryptocephalus freidbergi Lopatin & Chikatunov, 1997
- Ennomos freidbergi Hausmann, 1997
- Anthrax amnoni Zaitzev, 1997
- Chyliza amnoni Shatalkin, 1997
- Loxocera freidbergi Shatalkin, 1997
- Empis (Polyblepharis) freidbergi Chvála, 1999
- Isocanace freidbergi Mathis, 1999
- Philophylla freidbergi Han, 1999
- Freidbergia Merz, 1999
- Metatrichia freidbergi N. Krivosheina & M. Krivosheina, 1999
- Petrorossia freidbergi Zaitzev, 1999
- Bactrocera freidbergi White, 1999
- Adriapontia freidbergi Ozerov, 1999
- Campiglossa freidbergi Merz, 2000
- Cyamops freidbergi Baptista & Mathis, 2000
- Rhaebus amnoni Lopatin & Chikatunov, 2000
- Pelloloma freidbergi Kassebeer, 2000
- Caenoconops freidbergi Camras, 2000
- Ammoplanus freidbergi Boućek, 2001
- Xanthopterista freidbergi Lehrer, 2001
- Psila (Chamaepsila) freidbergi Shatalkin, 2001
- Dryxo freidbergi Mathis & Zatwarnicki, 2002
- Phthiria freidbergi Zaitzev, 2002
- Pelomyia freidbergi Foster & Mathis, 2003
- Mythenteles freidbergi Evenhuis, 2003
- Lacon freidbergi Platia, 2010
- Hercostomus freidbergi Grichanov, 2004
- Tachytrechus amnoni Grichanov, 2004
- Parochthiphila freidbergi Tanasijtshuk, 2004
- Hyadina freidbergi Mathis & Zatwarnicki, 2004
- Xantheremia freidbergi Volkovitz, 2004.
- Lasiorhynchites freidbergi Legalov & Friedman, 2007
- Catocala amnonfreidbergi Kravchenko, Speidel, Witt, Mooser, Seplyarsky, Saldaitis, Junnila & Mueller, 2008.
- Hilara freidbergi Chvála, 2008
- Hilara amnoni Chvála, 2008
- Coenosia freidbergi Pont & Grach, 2009
- Tachydromia freidbergi Shamshev & Grootaert, 2010
- Tigrisomyia amnoni Kirk-Spriggs, 2010
- Toxopoda freidbergi Ozerov, 2010
- Laconfreidbergi Platia, 2010
- Aulacigaster freidbergi Rung & Mathis, 2011
- Melanagromyza freidbergi Cerny, 2011
- Parastratiosphecomyia freidbergi Woodley, 2012
- Sobarocephala freidbergi Lonsdale & Marshall, 2012
- Ventrops freidbergi Cerretti & Pape, 2012
- Terellia freidbergi V. Korneyev, Evstigneev, Karimpour, Kütük, Mohamadzade Namin, Ömür Koyuncu & Yaran, 2013
- Lispe freidbergi Vikhrev, 2012
- Brachypogon (Isohelea) freidbergi Dominiak, Alwin & Giłka, 2014
- Oligopogon freidbergi Londt, 2014
- Tarchonanthopria freidbergi Audisio & Cline, 2014
- Sciapus freidbergi Grichanov & Negrobov, 2014
- Larinodontes freidbergi Gültekin & Friedman, 2015
- Bracon (Lucobracon) freidbergi J. Papp, 2015
- Otites freidbergi Morgulis, 2015
- Thecophora freidbergi Stuke, 2015
- Austrosolieria freidbergi Cerretti & O'Hara, 2016
- Fulgenta freidbergi MacGowan, 2017
- Madagopsina freidbergi Feijen & Feijen, 2017
- Andrena (Poecilandrena) freidbergi Pisanty & Scheuchl, 2018
- Cephalodromia freidbergi Evenhuis, 2019
- Pelignellus freidbergi Zatwarnicki & Mathis, 2019
- Teleopsis amnoni Feijen & Feijen, 2019
- Rhagoletis freidbergi S. Korneyev & V. Korneyev, 2019
- Pterocalla amnoni Hernández-Ortiz & Hernández-López, 2019
- Cerichrestus freidbergi Furth, 2019
- Amblypsilopus amnoni Bickel, 2019
- Ulidia amnoni Kameneva & V. Korneyev, 2019
- Merus freidbergi Friedman, 2019
- Metzneria freidbergi Bidzilya, Karsholt, Kravchenko & Šumpich, 2019
- Sphenometopa (Xantharaba) freidbergi Verves & Khrokalo, 2020
- Amblypsilopus freidbergi Grichanov, 2021
- Suragina freidbergi Muller, 2024
