= Stenomicra angustata =

Scientific classification
- Domain: Eukaryota
- Kingdom: Animalia
- Phylum: Arthropoda
- Class: Insecta
- Order: Diptera
- Family: Periscelididae
- Genus: Stenomicra
- Species: S. angustata

Binomial name
- Stenomicra angustata Coquillett, 1900

Species of fly

Stenomicra angustata is a species of fly in the family Periscelididae.
