= Cyamops micronesicus =

Scientific classification
- Domain: Eukaryota
- Kingdom: Animalia
- Phylum: Arthropoda
- Class: Insecta
- Order: Diptera
- Family: Periscelididae
- Genus: Cyamops
- Species: C. micronesicus

Binomial name
- Cyamops micronesicus Baptista & Mathis, 2000

Species of fly

Cyamops micronesicus is a species of fly. It is known from Yap (Federated States of Micronesia).

Adult males measure 2 mm (0.079 in) and adult females 1.8–2.1 mm (0.071–0.083 in) in length.
