= Cyamops nebulosus =

Scientific classification
- Domain: Eukaryota
- Kingdom: Animalia
- Phylum: Arthropoda
- Class: Insecta
- Order: Diptera
- Family: Periscelididae
- Genus: Cyamops
- Species: C. nebulosus

Binomial name
- Cyamops nebulosus Melander, 1913

Species of fly

Cyamops nebulosus is a species of fly in the family Periscelididae.
