= Gynandromyia mesnili =

Scientific classification
- Kingdom: Animalia
- Phylum: Arthropoda
- Class: Insecta
- Order: Diptera
- Family: Tachinidae
- Subfamily: Exoristinae
- Tribe: Ethillini
- Genus: Gynandromyia
- Species: G. mesnili

Binomial name
- Gynandromyia mesnili Verbeke, 1962

Species of fly

Gynandromyia mesnili is a species of bristle fly in the family Tachinidae.

== Distribution ==
Burundi.
