= Cyamops samoensis =

Scientific classification
- Domain: Eukaryota
- Kingdom: Animalia
- Phylum: Arthropoda
- Class: Insecta
- Order: Diptera
- Family: Periscelididae
- Genus: Cyamops
- Species: C. samoensis

Binomial name
- Cyamops samoensis Baptista & Mathis, 2000

Species of fly

Cyamops samoensis is a species of fly. It is known from Tutuila Island (American Samoa).

The holotype, a male, measures 1.8 mm (0.071 in) in length.
