= Gynandromyia habilis =

Scientific classification
- Kingdom: Animalia
- Phylum: Arthropoda
- Class: Insecta
- Order: Diptera
- Family: Tachinidae
- Subfamily: Exoristinae
- Tribe: Ethillini
- Genus: Gynandromyia
- Species: G. habilis

Binomial name
- Gynandromyia habilis (Brauer & von Berganstamm, 1891)

Synonyms
- Myxexorista habilis Brauer & von Berganstamm, 1891; Zenillia devastator Curran, 1927; Zenillia fuscicosta Curran, 1927

Species of fly

Gynandromyia habilis is a species of bristle fly in the family Tachinidae.

== Distribution ==
Widespread throughout western, eastern and southern Africa.
