= Gynandromyia bafwankei =

Scientific classification
- Kingdom: Animalia
- Phylum: Arthropoda
- Class: Insecta
- Order: Diptera
- Family: Tachinidae
- Subfamily: Exoristinae
- Tribe: Ethillini
- Genus: Gynandromyia
- Species: G. bafwankei

Binomial name
- Gynandromyia bafwankei Verbeke, 1962

Species of fly

Gynandromyia bafwankei is a species of bristle fly in the family Tachinidae.

== Distribution ==
Democratic Republic of the Congo.
