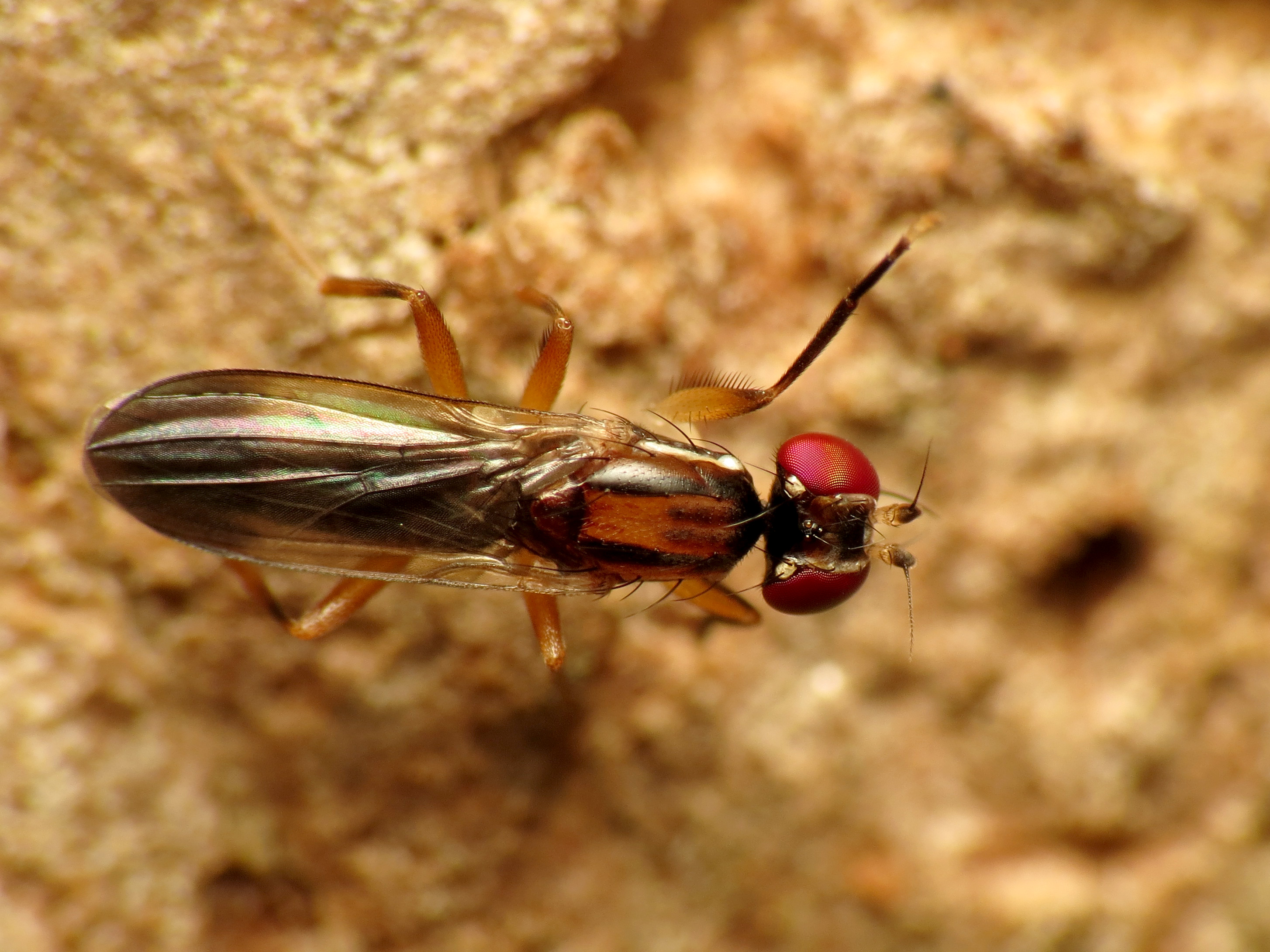

Scientific classification
- Domain: Eukaryota
- Kingdom: Animalia
- Phylum: Arthropoda
- Class: Insecta
- Order: Diptera
- Family: Clusiidae
- Genus: Clusiodes
- Species: C. johnsoni

Binomial name
- Clusiodes johnsoni Malloch, 1922

Synonyms
- Clusiodes nigripalpis Malloch, 1922

= Clusiodes johnsoni =

Species of fly

Clusiodes johnsoni is a species of fly in the family Clusiidae.
