= Clusiodes ater =

Scientific classification
- Domain: Eukaryota
- Kingdom: Animalia
- Phylum: Arthropoda
- Class: Insecta
- Order: Diptera
- Family: Clusiidae
- Genus: Clusiodes
- Species: C. ater

Binomial name
- Clusiodes ater Melander & Argo, 1924

Species of fly

Clusiodes ater is a species of fly in the family Clusiidae.
