= Cyamops fiji =

Scientific classification
- Domain: Eukaryota
- Kingdom: Animalia
- Phylum: Arthropoda
- Class: Insecta
- Order: Diptera
- Family: Periscelididae
- Genus: Cyamops
- Species: C. fiji

Binomial name
- Cyamops fiji Baptista & Mathis, 2000

Species of fly

Cyamops fiji is a species of fly. It is known from Viti Levu (Fiji).

Adult males measure 1.5–1.7 mm (0.059–0.067 in) and adult females 1.8–1.9 mm (0.071–0.075 in) in length.
