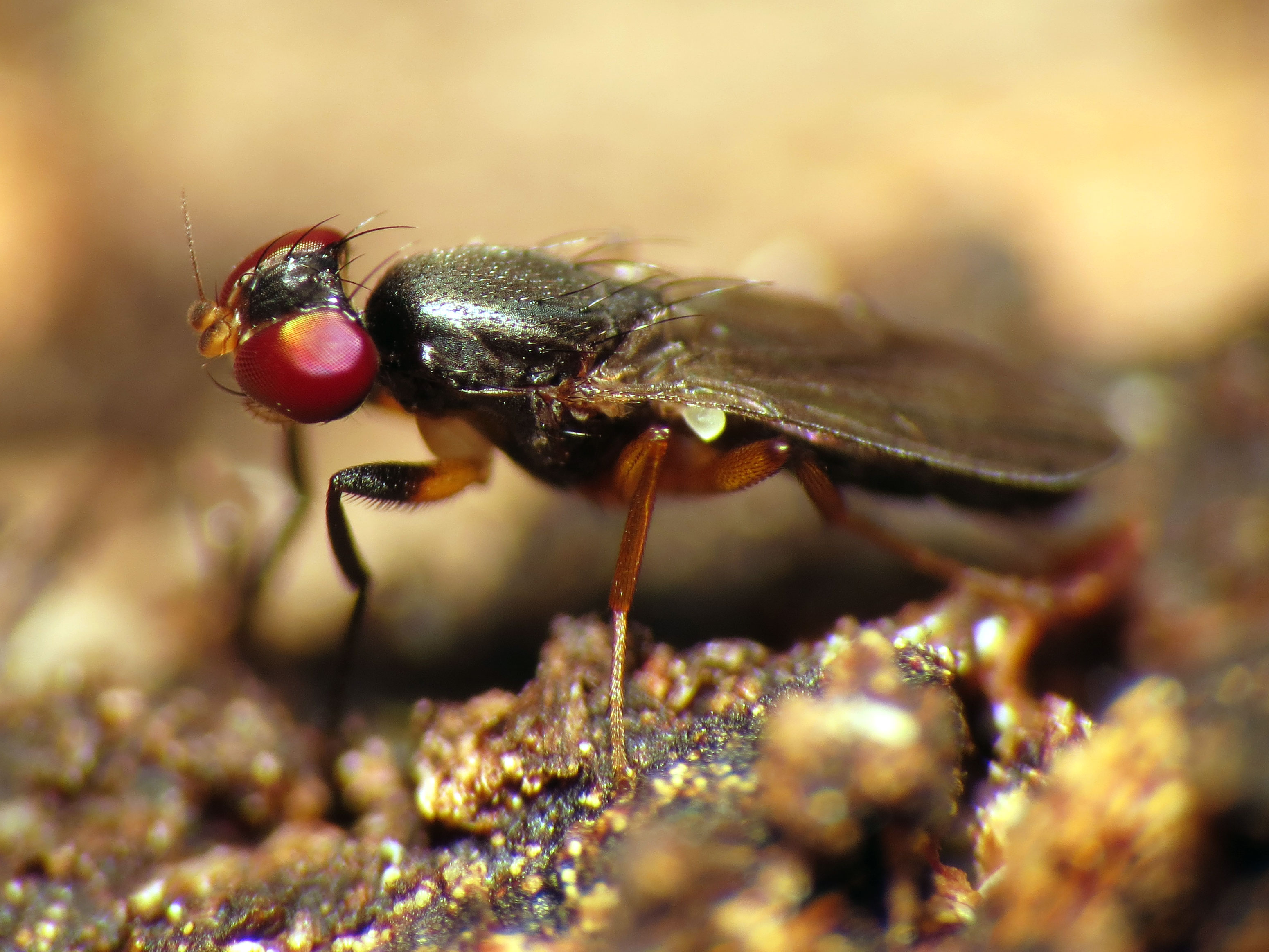

Scientific classification
- Kingdom: Animalia
- Phylum: Arthropoda
- Class: Insecta
- Order: Diptera
- Family: Clusiidae
- Subfamily: Clusiodinae
- Genus: Heteromeringia
- Species: H. nitida

Binomial name
- Heteromeringia nitida Johnson, 1913

= Heteromeringia nitida =

Species of fly

Heteromeringia nitida is a species of fly in the family Clusiidae.

== Distribution ==
United States, Mexico.

== Subspecies ==
These two subspecies belong to the species Heteromeringia nitida:

- Heteromeringia nitida nigripes Melander & Argo
- Heteromeringia nitida nitida
