= Cyamops kaplanae =

Scientific classification
- Kingdom: Animalia
- Phylum: Arthropoda
- Class: Insecta
- Order: Diptera
- Family: Periscelididae
- Genus: Cyamops
- Species: C. kaplanae

Binomial name
- Cyamops kaplanae Baptista & Mathis, 2000

Species of fly

Cyamops kaplanae is a species of fly. It is known from Khao Sok National Park, Thailand.

Adult male and female (holotype and paratype, respectively) measure 2.1 mm (0.083 in) in length.
