= Clusia czernyi =

Scientific classification
- Domain: Eukaryota
- Kingdom: Animalia
- Phylum: Arthropoda
- Class: Insecta
- Order: Diptera
- Family: Clusiidae
- Genus: Clusia
- Species: C. czernyi

Binomial name
- Clusia czernyi Johnson, 1913

Species of fly

Clusia czernyi is a species of fly in the family Clusiidae.
