= Cyamops nigeriensis =

Scientific classification
- Kingdom: Animalia
- Phylum: Arthropoda
- Class: Insecta
- Order: Diptera
- Family: Periscelididae
- Genus: Cyamops
- Species: C. nigeriensis

Binomial name
- Cyamops nigeriensis Baptista & Mathis, 2000

Species of fly

Cyamops nigeriensis is a species of fly. It is known from Nigeria.

Adult males measure 1.6–2 mm (0.063–0.079 in) and adult females 1.8–2 mm (0.071–0.079 in) in length.
