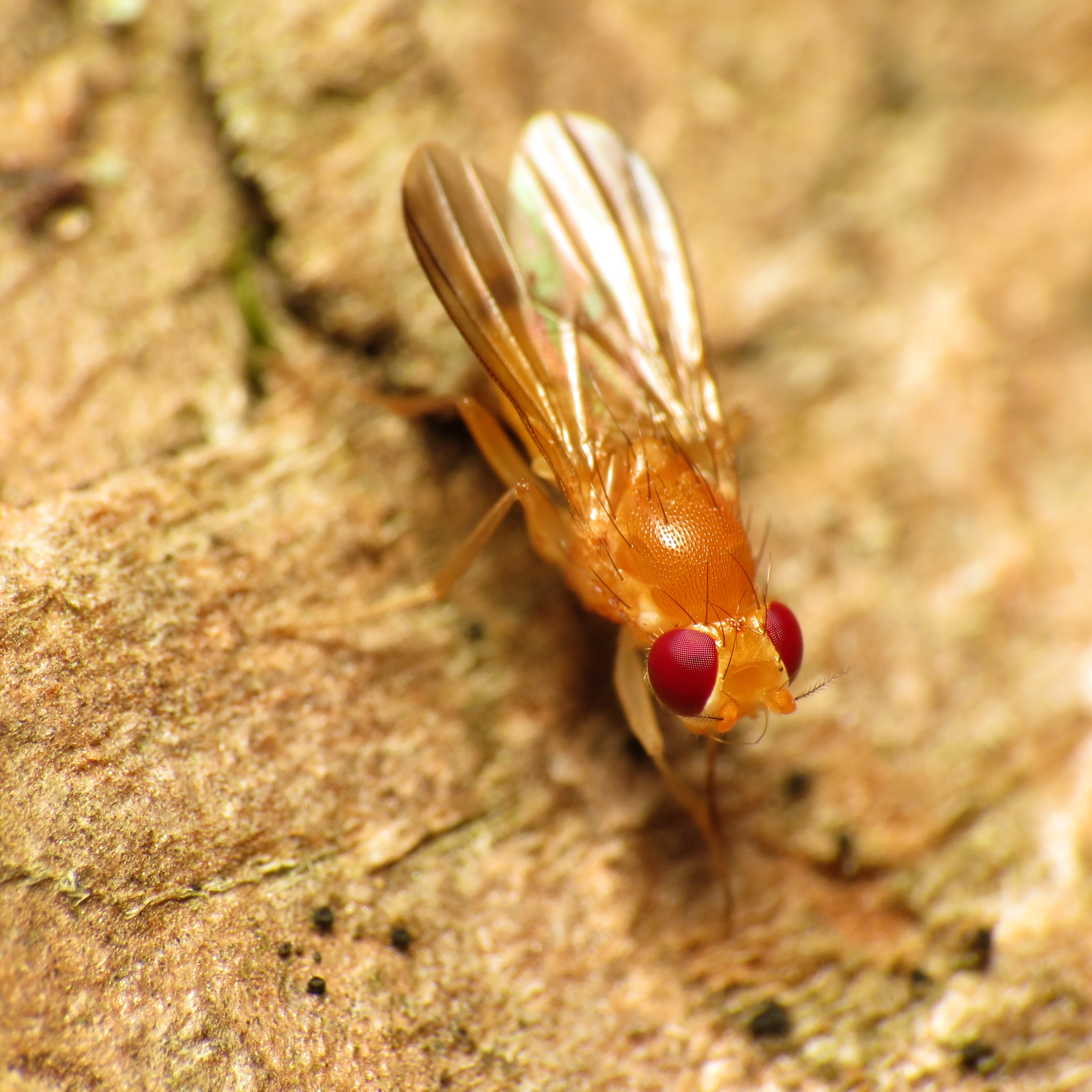

Scientific classification
- Domain: Eukaryota
- Kingdom: Animalia
- Phylum: Arthropoda
- Class: Insecta
- Order: Diptera
- Family: Clusiidae
- Genus: Sobarocephala
- Species: S. flaviseta

Binomial name
- Sobarocephala flaviseta (Johnson, 1913)

Synonyms
- Heteromeringia convergens Malloch, 1922; Heteromeringia flaviseta Johnson, 1913

= Sobarocephala flaviseta =

Species of fly

Sobarocephala flaviseta is a species of fly in the family Clusiidae.

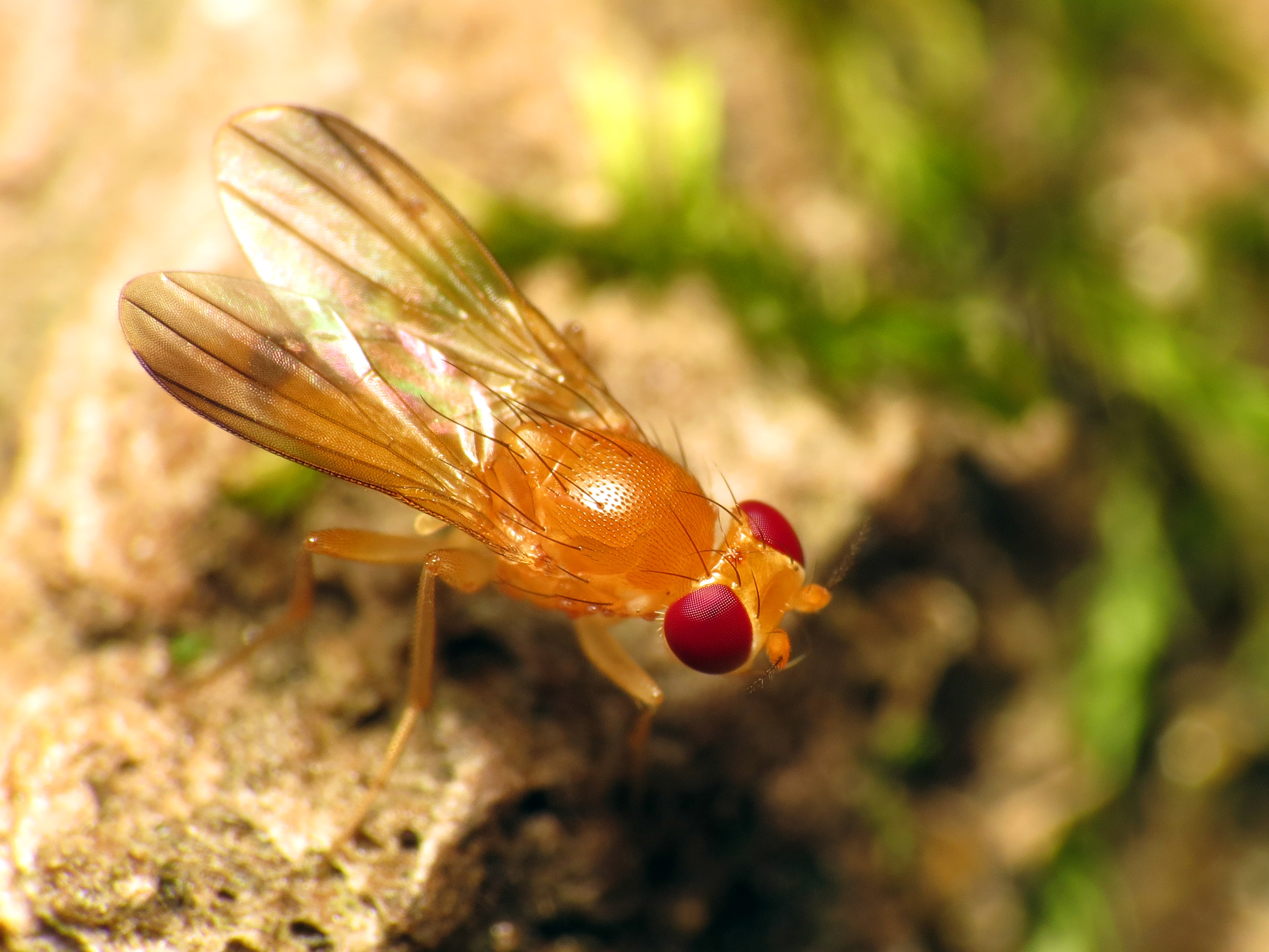
