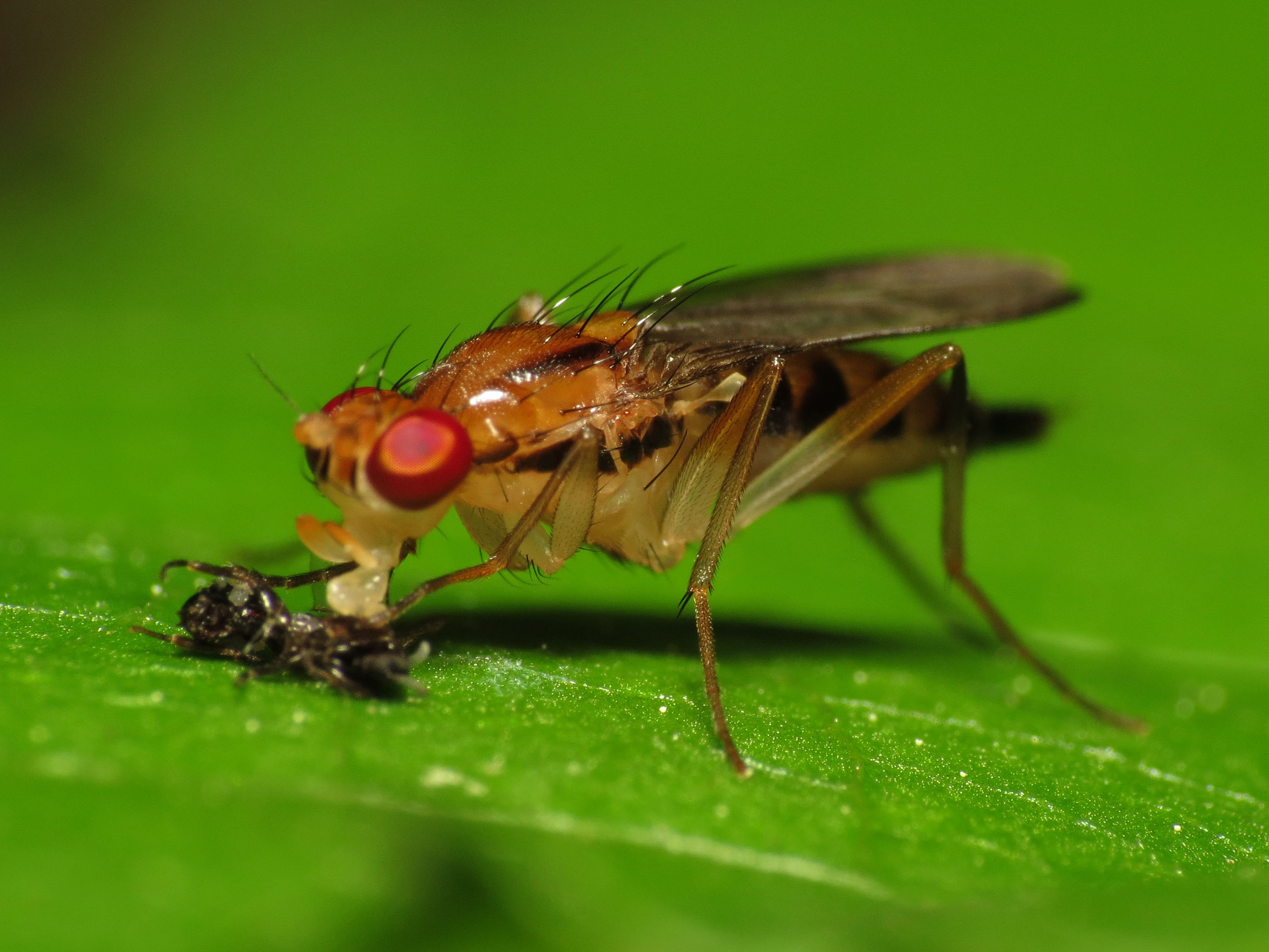

Scientific classification
- Kingdom: Animalia
- Phylum: Arthropoda
- Class: Insecta
- Order: Diptera
- Family: Clusiidae
- Genus: Clusia
- Species: C. lateralis

Binomial name
- Clusia lateralis (Walker, 1849)

Synonyms
- Helomyza lateralis Walker, 1849; Heteroneura spectabilis Loew, 1860

= Clusia lateralis =

Species of fly

Clusia lateralis is a species of fly in the family Clusiidae.

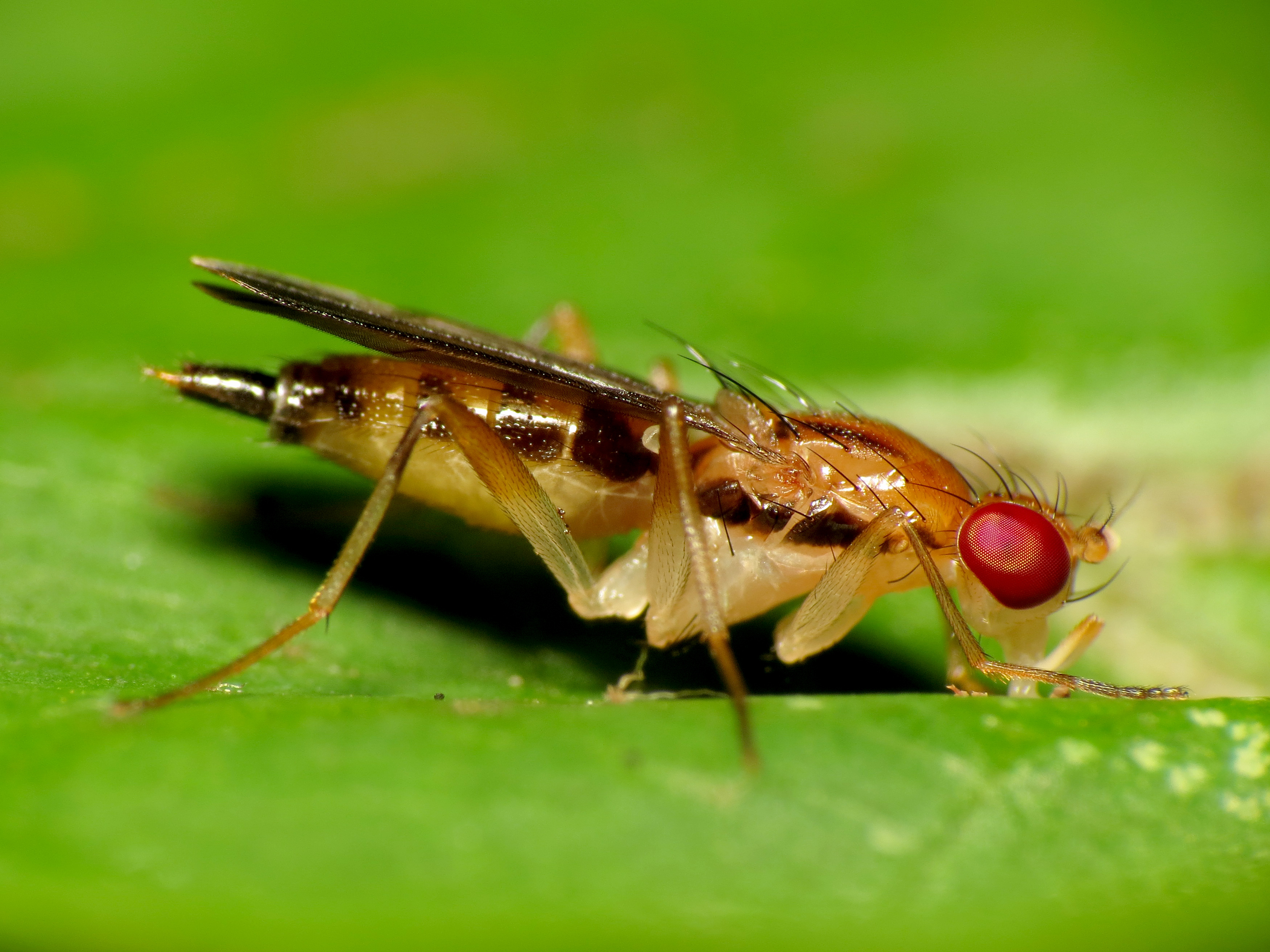

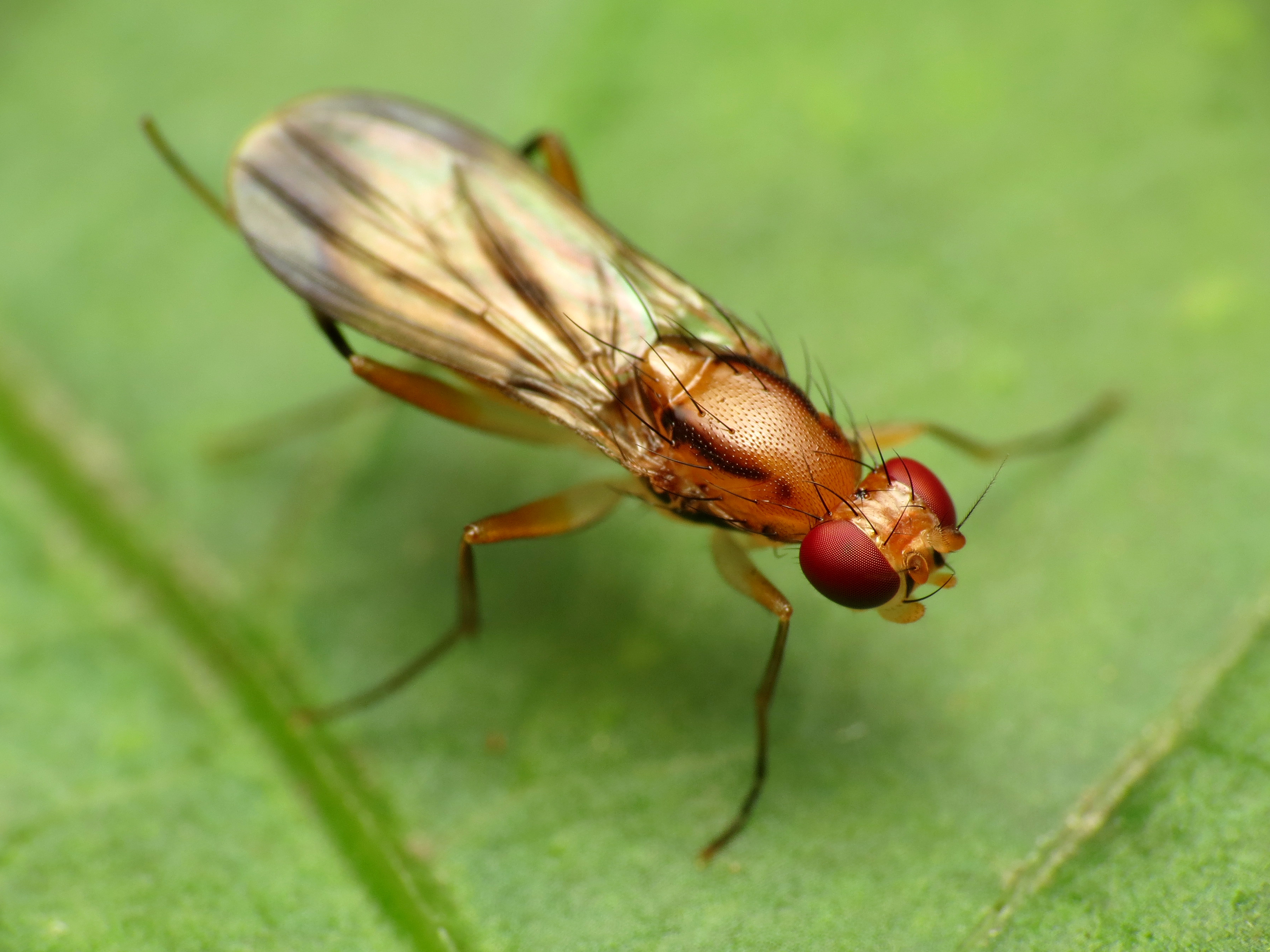
