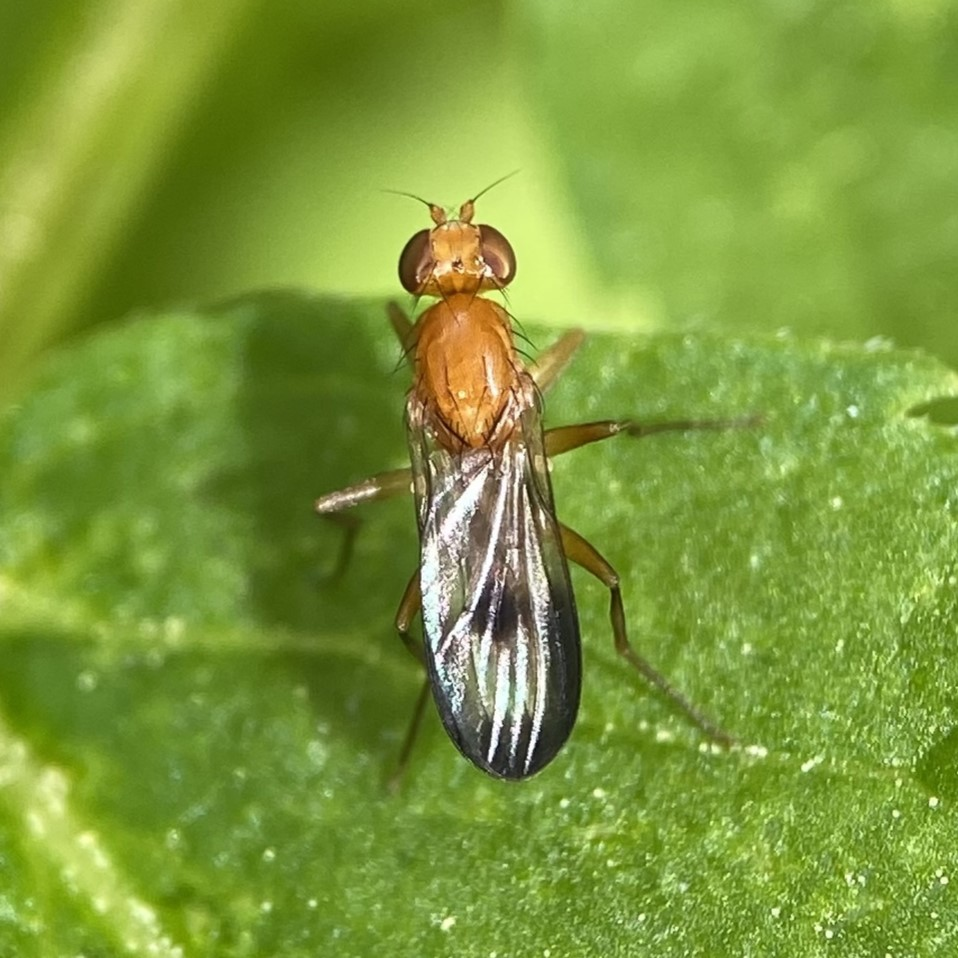

Scientific classification
- Domain: Eukaryota
- Kingdom: Animalia
- Phylum: Arthropoda
- Class: Insecta
- Order: Diptera
- Family: Clusiidae
- Genus: Clusia
- Species: C. occidentalis

Binomial name
- Clusia occidentalis Malloch, 1918

= Clusia occidentalis =

Species of North American druid fly

Clusia occidentalis is a species of fly in the family Clusiidae. It is found on the west coast of Canada and the United States of America, where it is the only known species of Clusia.
