= Sobarocephala setipes =

Scientific classification
- Domain: Eukaryota
- Kingdom: Animalia
- Phylum: Arthropoda
- Class: Insecta
- Order: Diptera
- Family: Clusiidae
- Genus: Sobarocephala
- Species: S. setipes

Binomial name
- Sobarocephala setipes Melander & Argo, 1924

Species of fly

Sobarocephala setipes is a species of fly in the family Clusiidae. This species was first described in 1924 by Axel Leonard Melander and Naomi George Argo.
