= Gynandromyia seychellensis =

Scientific classification
- Kingdom: Animalia
- Phylum: Arthropoda
- Class: Insecta
- Order: Diptera
- Family: Tachinidae
- Subfamily: Exoristinae
- Tribe: Ethillini
- Genus: Gynandromyia
- Species: G. seychellensis

Binomial name
- Gynandromyia seychellensis Bezzi, 1923

Species of fly

Gynandromyia seychellensis is a species of bristle fly in the family Tachinidae.

== Distribution ==
Seychelles.
