= Stenomicra cogani =

Scientific classification
- Domain: Eukaryota
- Kingdom: Animalia
- Phylum: Arthropoda
- Class: Insecta
- Order: Diptera
- Family: Periscelididae
- Genus: Stenomicra
- Species: S. cogani

Binomial name
- Stenomicra cogani Irwin, 1982

Species of fly

Stenomicra cogani is a species of fly belonging to the family Periscelididae.

It is native to Western Europe.
