= Cyamops crosbyi =

Scientific classification
- Kingdom: Animalia
- Phylum: Arthropoda
- Class: Insecta
- Order: Diptera
- Family: Periscelididae
- Genus: Cyamops
- Species: C. crosbyi

Binomial name
- Cyamops crosbyi Mathis & Sueyoshi, 2011

Species of fly

Cyamops crosbyi is a species of fly. It is found in New Zealand.
