= Sobarocephala atricornis =

Scientific classification
- Domain: Eukaryota
- Kingdom: Animalia
- Phylum: Arthropoda
- Class: Insecta
- Order: Diptera
- Family: Clusiidae
- Genus: Sobarocephala
- Species: S. atricornis

Binomial name
- Sobarocephala atricornis Sabrosky, 1974

Species of fly

Sobarocephala atricornis is a species of fly in the family Clusiidae.
