= Cyamops femoratus =

Scientific classification
- Kingdom: Animalia
- Phylum: Arthropoda
- Class: Insecta
- Order: Diptera
- Family: Periscelididae
- Genus: Cyamops
- Species: C. femoratus

Binomial name
- Cyamops femoratus Baptista & Mathis, 2000

Species of fly

Cyamops femoratus is a species of fly. It is known from Lake Balinsasayao (Negros Island, the Philippines).

Adult males measure 2.3–2.4 mm (0.091–0.094 in) and adult females 2.4–2.7 mm (0.094–0.106 in) in length.
