= Periscelis occidentalis =

Scientific classification
- Domain: Eukaryota
- Kingdom: Animalia
- Phylum: Arthropoda
- Class: Insecta
- Order: Diptera
- Family: Periscelididae
- Genus: Periscelis
- Species: P. occidentalis

Binomial name
- Periscelis occidentalis Sturtevant, 1954

Species of fly

Periscelis occidentalis is a species of fly in the family Periscelididae.
