= Cyamops laos =

Scientific classification
- Kingdom: Animalia
- Phylum: Arthropoda
- Class: Insecta
- Order: Diptera
- Family: Periscelididae
- Genus: Cyamops
- Species: C. laos

Binomial name
- Cyamops laos Baptista & Mathis, 2000

Species of fly

Cyamops laos is a species of fly. It is known from Vientiane province, Laos.

Adult males measure 1.7–1.9 mm (0.067–0.075 in) and adult females 2.2–2.6 mm (0.087–0.102 in) in length.
