= Sobarocephala quadrimaculata =

Scientific classification
- Domain: Eukaryota
- Kingdom: Animalia
- Phylum: Arthropoda
- Class: Insecta
- Order: Diptera
- Family: Clusiidae
- Genus: Sobarocephala
- Species: S. quadrimaculata

Binomial name
- Sobarocephala quadrimaculata Soos, 1963

Synonyms
- Sobarocephala nitida Soos, 1963

Species of fly

Sobarocephala quadrimaculata is a species of fly in the family Clusiidae.
