= Cyamops halteratus =

Scientific classification
- Domain: Eukaryota
- Kingdom: Animalia
- Phylum: Arthropoda
- Class: Insecta
- Order: Diptera
- Family: Periscelididae
- Genus: Cyamops
- Species: C. halteratus

Binomial name
- Cyamops halteratus Sabrosky, 1958

Species of fly

Cyamops halteratus is a species of fly in the family Periscelididae.
