= Sobarocephala latifrons =

Scientific classification
- Domain: Eukaryota
- Kingdom: Animalia
- Phylum: Arthropoda
- Class: Insecta
- Order: Diptera
- Family: Clusiidae
- Genus: Sobarocephala
- Species: S. latifrons

Binomial name
- Sobarocephala latifrons (Loew, 1860)

Synonyms
- Heteroneura latifrons Loew, 1860

Species of fly

Sobarocephala latifrons is a species of fly in the family Clusiidae.
