= Gynandromyia longicornis =

Scientific classification
- Kingdom: Animalia
- Phylum: Arthropoda
- Class: Insecta
- Order: Diptera
- Family: Tachinidae
- Subfamily: Exoristinae
- Tribe: Ethillini
- Genus: Gynandromyia
- Species: G. longicornis

Binomial name
- Gynandromyia longicornis (Sun & Zhao, 1992)

Synonyms
- Zenilliana longicornis Sun & Zhao, 1992

Species of fly

Gynandromyia longicornis is a species of tachinid flies in the genus Gynandromyia of the family Tachinidae.

== Distribution ==
China
