= Cyamops banvaneue =

Scientific classification
- Kingdom: Animalia
- Phylum: Arthropoda
- Class: Insecta
- Order: Diptera
- Family: Periscelididae
- Genus: Cyamops
- Species: C. banvaneue

Binomial name
- Cyamops banvaneue Baptista & Mathis, 2000

Species of fly

Cyamops banvaneue is a species of fly. It is known from Vientiane province, Laos.

Adult males measure 1.5–2.5 mm (0.059–0.098 in) and adult females 1.8–2.1 mm (0.071–0.083 in) in length.
