= Cyamops funkae =

Scientific classification
- Kingdom: Animalia
- Phylum: Arthropoda
- Class: Insecta
- Order: Diptera
- Family: Periscelididae
- Genus: Cyamops
- Species: C. funkae

Binomial name
- Cyamops funkae Baptista & Mathis, 2000

Species of fly

Cyamops funkae is a species of fly. It is known from Guyana.

Adult males measure 2.5–2.6 mm (0.098–0.102 in) and adult females 3.0 mm (0.12 in) in length.
