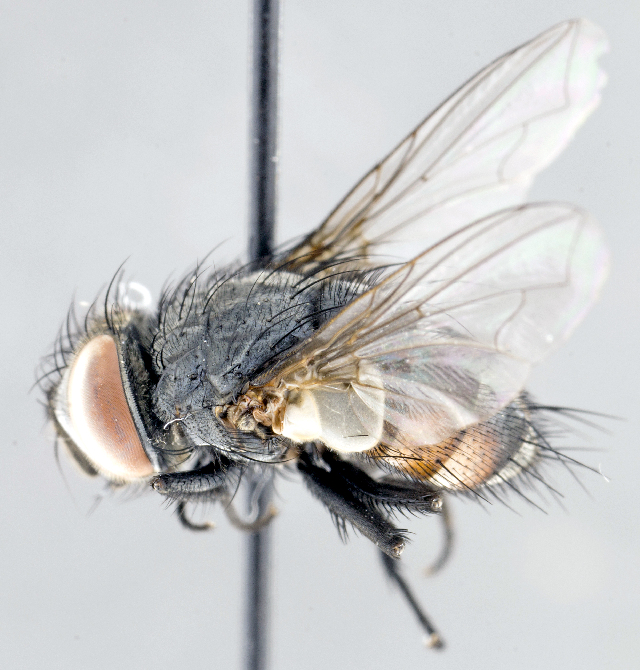
- Neoethilla ignobilis

Scientific classification
- Kingdom: Animalia
- Phylum: Arthropoda
- Class: Insecta
- Order: Diptera
- Family: Tachinidae
- Subfamily: Exoristinae
- Tribe: Ethillini
- Genus: Neoethilla; Cerretti, Wood & O'Hara, 2012

Type species
- Exorista ignobilis Wulp, 1890

= Neoethilla =

Genus of flies

Neoethilla is a genus of flies in the family Tachinidae. The species in this genus was formerly considered to be a member of the genus Winthemia.

== Species ==
- Neoethilla ignobilis (Wulp, 1890)

== Distribution ==
United States, Mexico, Chile.
