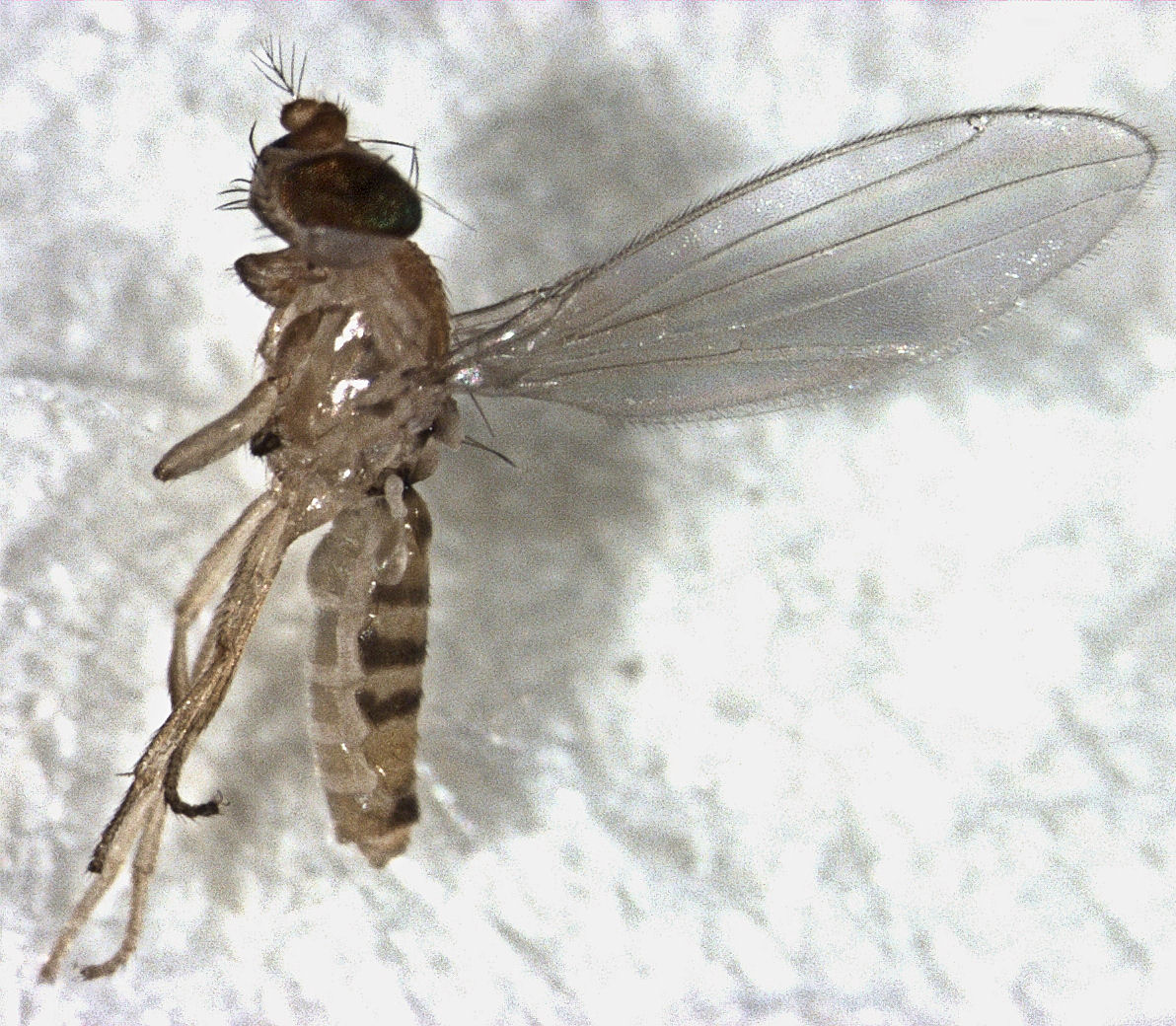

Scientific classification
- Domain: Eukaryota
- Kingdom: Animalia
- Phylum: Arthropoda
- Class: Insecta
- Order: Diptera
- Family: Periscelididae
- Genus: Stenomicra; Coquilett, 1900

= Stenomicra =

Genus of flies

Stenomicra is a genus of flies in the family Periscelididae. There are more than 20 described species in the genus Stenomicra.

== Species ==
These 28 species belong to the genus Stenomicra:

- Stenomicra albibasis Sabrosky, 1965
- Stenomicra angustata Coquillett, 1900
- Stenomicra angustiforceps Sabrosky, 1965
- Stenomicra argentata Sabrosky, 1965
- Stenomicra australis Malloch, 1927
- Stenomicra bicolor (Seguy, 1938)
- Stenomicra biconspicua Sabrosky, 1975
- Stenomicra claripennis (Papp, 2006)
- Stenomicra cogani Irwin, 1982
- Stenomicra deemingi Sabrosky, 1975
- Stenomicra delicata (Collin, 1944)
- Stenomicra fascipennis Malloch, 1927
- Stenomicra flava Papp, 2006
- Stenomicra flavida Hennig, 1956
- Stenomicra jordanensis Freidberg & Mathis, 2002
- Stenomicra nigricolor Sabrosky, 1975
- Stenomicra orientalis Malloch
- Stenomicra parataeniata Hennig, 1956
- Stenomicra rufithorax Sabrosky, 1975
- Stenomicra soniae Merz & Rohacek, 2005
- Stenomicra stuckenbergi Sabrosky, 1975
- Stenomicra taeniata Hennig, 1956
- Stenomicra trimaculata Sabrosky, 1975
- Stenomicra uniconspicua Sabrosky, 1975
- Stenomicra urbana Gomes, Ale-Rocha & Ferreira-Keppler, 2018
- Stenomicra variegata (Papp, 2006)
- † Stenomicra anacrostichalis Grimaldi & Mathis, 1993
- † Stenomicra sabroskyi Grimaldi & Mathis, 1993
