= Atylomyia =

Scientific classification
- Kingdom: Animalia
- Phylum: Arthropoda
- Class: Insecta
- Order: Diptera
- Family: Tachinidae
- Subfamily: Exoristinae
- Tribe: Ethillini
- Genus: Atylomyia; Brauer, 1898

Type species
- Atylomyia loewi Brauer, 1898

Genus of flies

Atylomyia is a genus of flies in the family Tachinidae.

== Species ==
- Atylomyia albifrons Villeneuve, 1911
- Atylomyia loewi Brauer, 1898
- Atylomyia mesnili Herting, 1981
