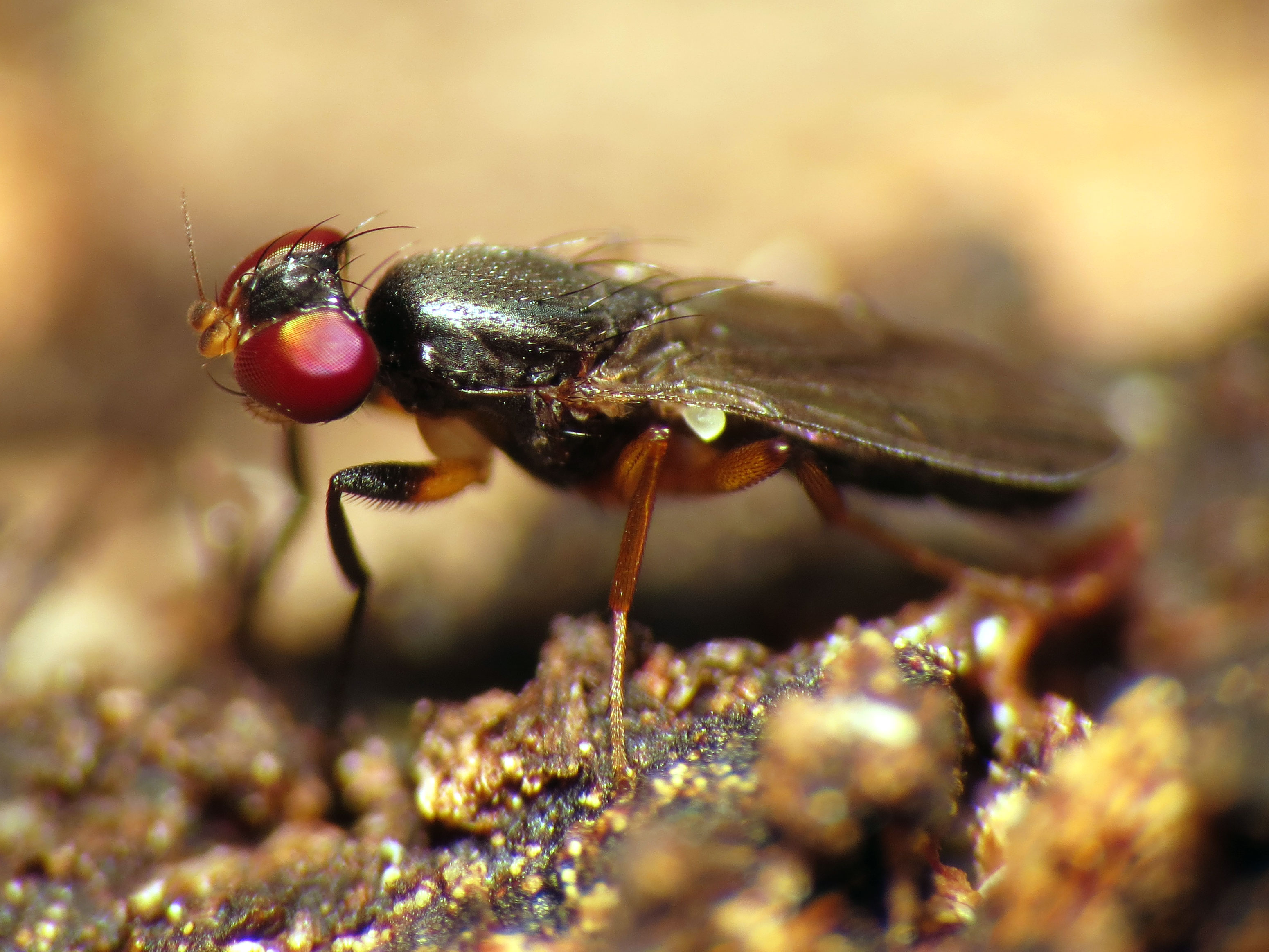
- Heteromeringia nitida

Scientific classification
- Domain: Eukaryota
- Kingdom: Animalia
- Phylum: Arthropoda
- Class: Insecta
- Order: Diptera
- Family: Clusiidae
- Subfamily: Clusiodinae
- Genus: Heteromeringia; Czerny, 1903

Synonyms
- Tranomeringia Sasakawa, 1966

= Heteromeringia =

Genus of flies

Heteromeringia is a genus of flies in the family Clusiidae. There are more than 70 described species in Heteromeringia.

== Species ==
These 76 species belong to the genus Heteromeringia:

- Heteromeringia abatanensis Sasakawa, 2011
- Heteromeringia aethiopica Verbeke, 1968
- Heteromeringia annulipes Johnson, 1913
- Heteromeringia apholis Lonsdale & Marshall, 2007
- Heteromeringia aphotisma Lonsdale & Marshall, 2007
- Heteromeringia apicalis Sasakawa, 1966
- Heteromeringia atypica Frey, 1960
- Heteromeringia australiae Malloch, 1926
- Heteromeringia cornuta Sasakawa, 1966
- Heteromeringia crenulata Sueyoshi, 2006
- Heteromeringia czernyi Kertész, 1903
- Heteromeringia decora Lonsdale & Marshall, 2007
- Heteromeringia didyma Sasakawa, 1966
- Heteromeringia dimidiata Hennig, 1938
- Heteromeringia flavifrons Hennig, 1938
- Heteromeringia flavipes (Williston, 1896)
- Heteromeringia flaviventris Sasakawa, 1966
- Heteromeringia fucata Hendel, 1936
- Heteromeringia fumipennis Melander & Argo, 1924
- Heteromeringia gressitti Sasakawa, 1966
- Heteromeringia hardyi McAlpine, 1960
- Heteromeringia helicina Sasakawa, 1966
- Heteromeringia hypoleuca McAlpine, 1960
- Heteromeringia imitans Malloch, 1930
- Heteromeringia kondoi Sasakawa, 1966
- Heteromeringia lateralis Lonsdale & Marshall, 2007
- Heteromeringia laticornis McAlpine, 1960
- Heteromeringia leucosticta Frey, 1960
- Heteromeringia luzonica Frey, 1928
- Heteromeringia lyneborgi Sasakawa, 1966
- Heteromeringia malaisei Frey, 1960
- Heteromeringia malayensis Sasakawa, 1966
- Heteromeringia mediana Lonsdale & Marshall, 2007
- Heteromeringia melaena Sasakawa, 1966
- Heteromeringia melanoprotoma Sasakawa, 2011
- Heteromeringia melasoma Sasakawa, 1966
- Heteromeringia mirabilis Sasakawa, 1966
- Heteromeringia nanella Lonsdale & Marshall, 2007
- Heteromeringia nervosa Lonsdale & Marshall, 2007
- Heteromeringia nigricans Sasakawa, 1966
- Heteromeringia nigriceps Lamb, 1914
- Heteromeringia nigrifrons Kertész, 1903
- Heteromeringia nigrimana Loew, 1864
- Heteromeringia nigripes Melander & Argo, 1924
- Heteromeringia nigrotibialis Frey, 1960
- Heteromeringia nitida Johnson, 1913
- Heteromeringia nitobei Sasakawa, 1966
- Heteromeringia norrisi McAlpine, 1960
- Heteromeringia novaguinensis Sasakawa, 1966
- Heteromeringia opisthochracea Sasakawa, 1966
- Heteromeringia papuensis Sasakawa, 1966
- Heteromeringia paraphalloides Sasakawa, 2011
- Heteromeringia pectinata Sasakawa, 2011
- Heteromeringia polynesiensis Sasakawa, 1966
- Heteromeringia pristilepsis Sasakawa, 1966
- Heteromeringia pulla McAlpine, 1960
- Heteromeringia quadriseta Lonsdale & Marshall, 2007
- Heteromeringia quadrispinosa Sueyoshi, 2006
- Heteromeringia rufithorax Czerny, 1926
- Heteromeringia sexramifera Sueyoshi, 2006
- Heteromeringia spinulifera Sasakawa, 2011
- Heteromeringia spinulosa McAlpine, 1960
- Heteromeringia stenygralis Sasakawa, 1966
- Heteromeringia steyskali Sasakawa, 1966
- Heteromeringia stictica Sasakawa, 1966
- Heteromeringia strandtmannorum Sasakawa, 1966
- Heteromeringia supernigra Mamaev, 1987
- Heteromeringia sycophanta Sasakawa, 1966
- Heteromeringia tephrinos Lonsdale & Marshall, 2007
- Heteromeringia trimaculata Sasakawa, 1993
- Heteromeringia veitchi Bezzi, 1928
- Heteromeringia volcana Lonsdale & Marshall, 2007
- Heteromeringia yamata Sueyoshi, 2006
- Heteromeringia zophina Lonsdale & Marshall, 2007
- Heteromeringia zosteriformis Sasakawa, 1966
