= Cyamops freidbergi =

Scientific classification
- Kingdom: Animalia
- Phylum: Arthropoda
- Class: Insecta
- Order: Diptera
- Family: Periscelididae
- Genus: Cyamops
- Species: C. freidbergi

Binomial name
- Cyamops freidbergi Baptista & Mathis, 2000

Species of fly

Cyamops freidbergi is a species of fly. It is endemic to Madagascar.

The holotype, an adult male, measures 1.9 mm (0.075 in) in length.
