= Zelindopsis =

Scientific classification
- Kingdom: Animalia
- Phylum: Arthropoda
- Class: Insecta
- Order: Diptera
- Family: Tachinidae
- Subfamily: Exoristinae
- Tribe: Ethillini
- Genus: Zelindopsis; Anonymous, 1946

Type species
- Zelindopsis duplaria Villeneuve, 1943

Synonyms
- Zelindopsis Villeneuve, 1943

Genus of flies

Zelindopsis is a genus of flies in the family Tachinidae.

== Species ==
- Zelindopsis bicincta (Villeneuve, 1916)
- Zelindopsis cornuta Verbeke, 1962
- Zelindopsis duplaria Villeneuve, 1943
- Zelindopsis illita (Villeneuve, 1916)
- Zelindopsis nigripalpis (Verbeke, 1962)
- Zelindopsis nigrocauda (Curran, 1927)
- Zelindopsis nitidicauda (Curran, 1940)
- Zelindopsis nudapex (Curran, 1940)
- Zelindopsis stativa (Villeneuve, 1943)
- Zelindopsis ugandana (Curran, 1940)
- Zelindopsis villeneuvei Verbeke, 1962
- Zelindopsis zenia (Curran, 1940)
