= Paratryphera =

Scientific classification
- Kingdom: Animalia
- Phylum: Arthropoda
- Class: Insecta
- Order: Diptera
- Family: Tachinidae
- Subfamily: Exoristinae
- Tribe: Ethillini
- Genus: Paratryphera; Brauer & von Berganstamm, 1891

Type species
- Paratryphera handlirschii Brauer & von Berganstamm, 1891

Synonyms
- Chaetinella Mesnil, 1944

Genus of flies

Paratryphera is a genus of flies in the family Tachinidae.

== Species ==
- Paratryphera barbatula (Rondani, 1859)
- Paratryphera bisetosa (Brauer & von Berganstamm, 1891)
- Paratryphera grandis Ziegler & Shima, 1996
- Paratryphera longicornis Mesnil, 1970
- Paratryphera mesnili Herting, 1977
- Paratryphera minor Shima, 1980
- Paratryphera palpalis (Rondani, 1859)
- Paratryphera sordida (Villeneuve, 1916)
- Paratryphera yichengensis Liu, Chao & Li, 1999
