= Ethilla =

Scientific classification
- Kingdom: Animalia
- Phylum: Arthropoda
- Clade: Pancrustacea
- Class: Insecta
- Order: Diptera
- Family: Tachinidae
- Subfamily: Exoristinae
- Tribe: Ethillini
- Genus: Ethilla; Robineau-Desvoidy, 1863

Type species
- Ethilla aemula Meigen, 1824

Synonyms
- Cynisca Robineau-Desvoidy, 1863; Ethylla Mesnil, 1939

Genus of flies

Ethilla is a genus of flies in the family Tachinidae.

== Species ==
- Ethilla adiscalis Mesnil, 1977
- Ethilla aemula (Meigen, 1824)
- Ethilla tenor (Curran, 1927)
- Ethilla translucens (Macquart, 1851)
