= Nemorilloides =

Scientific classification
- Kingdom: Animalia
- Phylum: Arthropoda
- Class: Insecta
- Order: Diptera
- Family: Tachinidae
- Subfamily: Exoristinae
- Tribe: Ethillini
- Genus: Nemorilloides; Brauer & von Berganstamm, 1891

Type species
- Nemorilloides flaviventris Brauer & von Berganstamm, 1891

Genus of flies

Nemorilloides is a genus of flies in the family Tachinidae.

== Species ==
- Nemorilloides carbonata Mesnil, 1952
- Nemorilloides flaviventris Brauer & von Berganstamm, 1891
