= Phorocerosoma =

Scientific classification
- Kingdom: Animalia
- Phylum: Arthropoda
- Class: Insecta
- Order: Diptera
- Family: Tachinidae
- Subfamily: Exoristinae
- Tribe: Ethillini
- Genus: Phorocerosoma; Townsend, 1927

Type species
- Phorocerosoma forte Townsend, 1927

Genus of flies

Phorocerosoma is a genus of flies in the family Tachinidae.

== Species ==
- Phorocerosoma aberrans Verbeke, 1962
- Phorocerosoma albifacies Verbeke, 1962
- Phorocerosoma aurea Sun & Chao, 1994
- Phorocerosoma caparti Verbeke, 1962
- Phorocerosoma cilipes (Macquart, 1847)
- Phorocerosoma echinum Verbeke, 1962
- Phorocerosoma elegans Verbeke, 1962
- Phorocerosoma forcipatum Verbeke, 1962
- Phorocerosoma pilipes (Villeneuve, 1916)
- Phorocerosoma postulans (Walker, 1861)
- Phorocerosoma vicarium (Walker, 1856)
