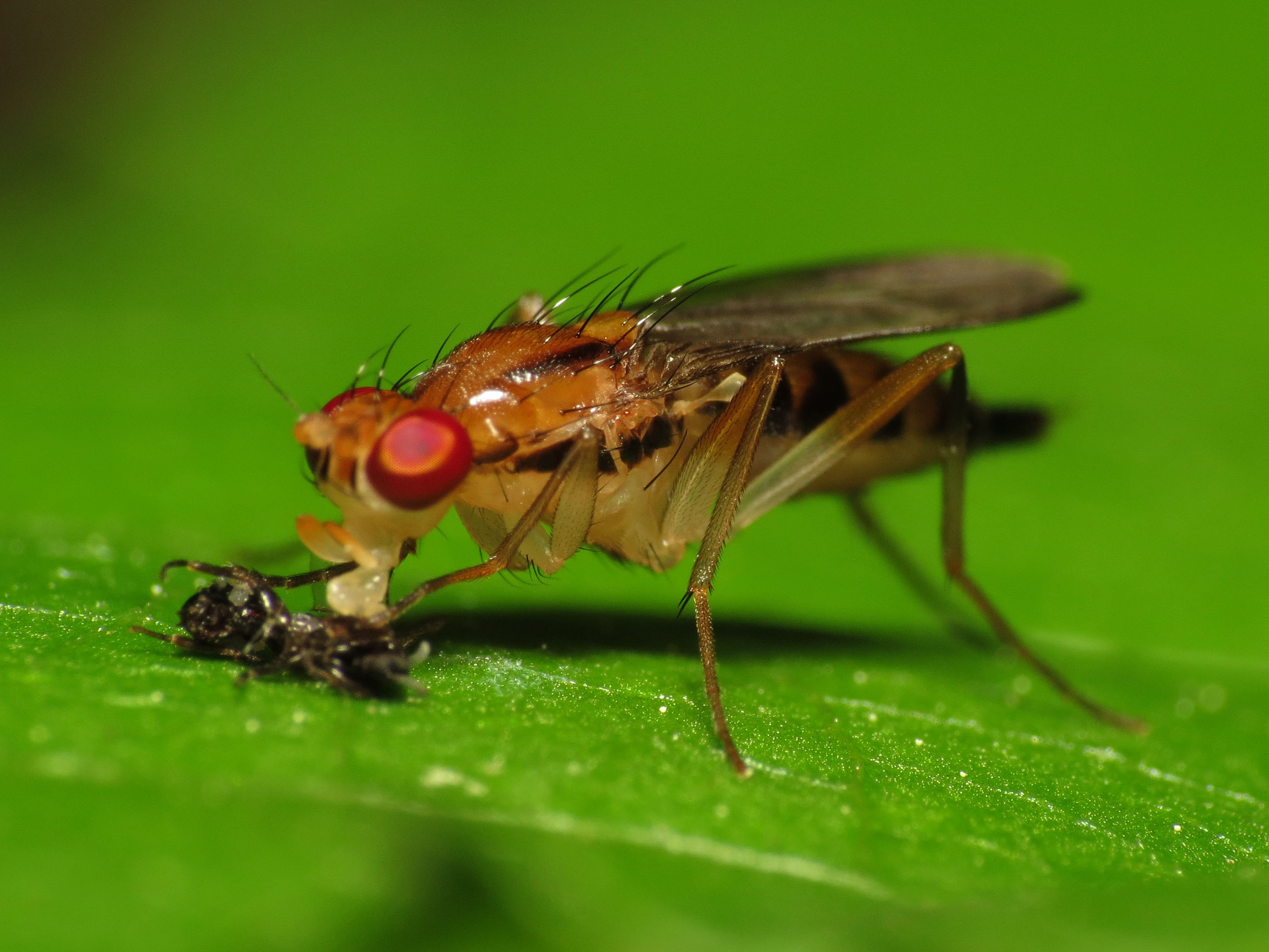
- Clusia lateralis

Scientific classification
- Domain: Eukaryota
- Kingdom: Animalia
- Phylum: Arthropoda
- Class: Insecta
- Order: Diptera
- Family: Clusiidae
- Subfamily: Clusiinae
- Genus: Clusia; Haliday, 1839

= Clusia (fly) =

Genus of flies

Clusia is a genus of flies in the family Clusiidae. There are about 12 described species in Clusia.

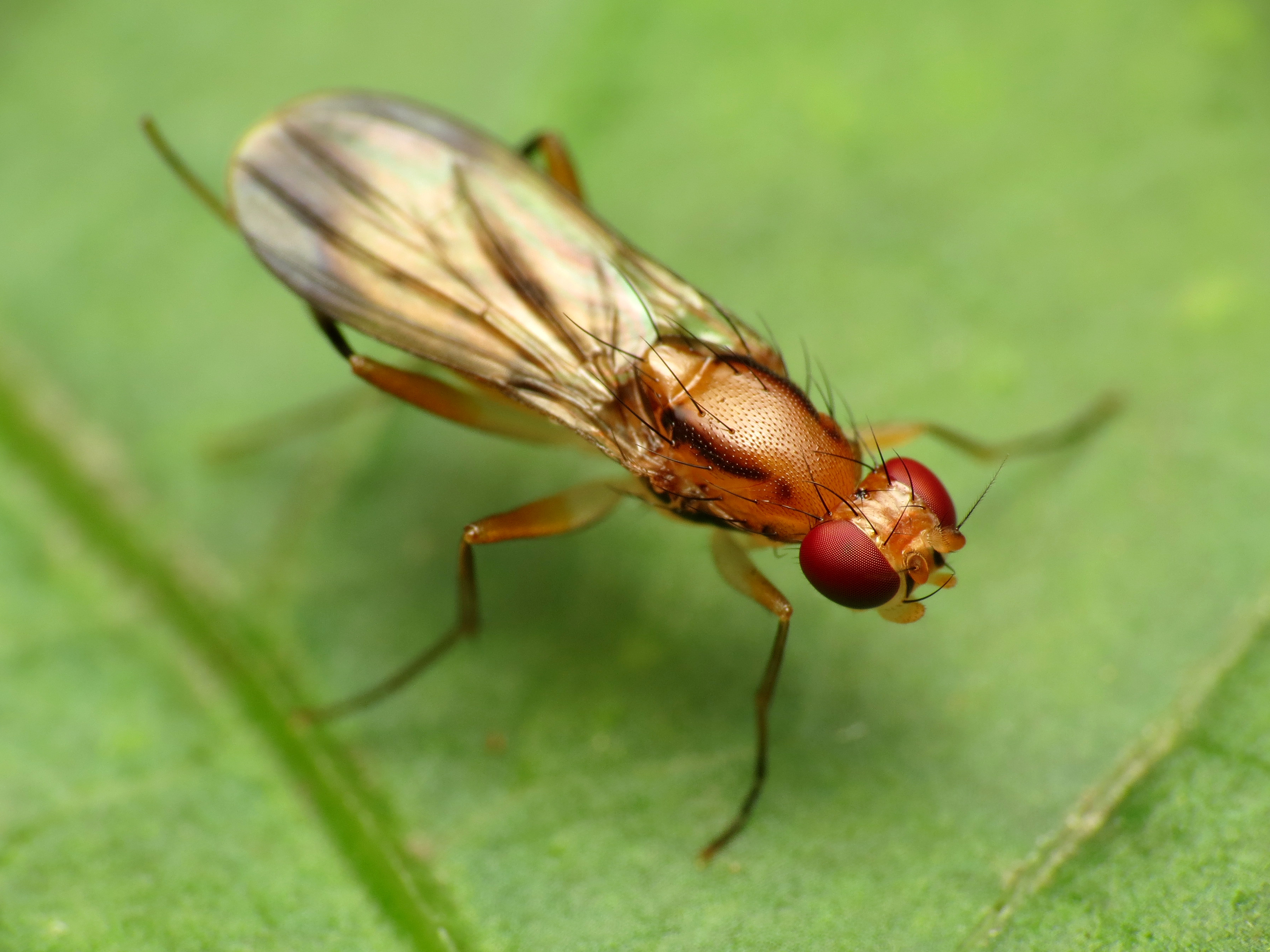
Clusia lateralis

== Species ==
These 12 species belong to the genus Clusia.

- Clusia ciliata Sasakawa, 1959
- Clusia czernyi Johnson, 1913
- Clusia flava Meigen, 1830
- Clusia intermedialis Mamaev, 1974
- Clusia japonica Sasakawa, 1957
- Clusia lateralis (Walker, 1849)
- Clusia occidentalis Malloch, 1918
- Clusia okadomei Sasakawa, 1986
- Clusia omogensis Sasakawa, 1965
- Clusia sexlineata Frey, 1960
- Clusia tigrina Fallén, 1820
- Clusia unita Mamaev, 1974
