= Periscelis =

Scientific classification
- Domain: Eukaryota
- Kingdom: Animalia
- Phylum: Arthropoda
- Class: Insecta
- Order: Diptera
- Family: Periscelididae
- Genus: Periscelis; Loew, 1858

Genus of flies

Periscelis is a genus of flies in the family Periscelididae. There are about 15 described species in Periscelis.

== Species ==
These 15 species belong to the genus Periscelis:

- Periscelis annectans Sturtevant, 1963
- Periscelis annulata (Fallen, 1813)
- Periscelis annulipes Loew, 1858
- Periscelis chinensis Papp & Szappanos, 1998
- Periscelis fasciata Mathis, 1993
- Periscelis flinti (Malloch, 1915)
- Periscelis heegeri (Duda, 1934)
- Periscelis kabuli Papp, 1988
- Periscelis kaszabi Papp, 1988
- Periscelis nebulosa Hendel, 1913
- Periscelis nigra (Zetterstedt, 1860)
- Periscelis occidentalis Sturtevant, 1954
- Periscelis schulzei Duda, 1934
- Periscelis wheeleri (Sturtevant, 1923)
- Periscelis winnertzii Egger, 1862
