= Ethylloides =

Scientific classification
- Kingdom: Animalia
- Phylum: Arthropoda
- Class: Insecta
- Order: Diptera
- Family: Tachinidae
- Subfamily: Exoristinae
- Tribe: Ethillini
- Genus: Ethylloides; Verbeke, 1970

Type species
- Ethylloides emdeni Verbeke, 1970

Genus of flies

Ethylloides is a genus of flies in the family Tachinidae.

== Species ==
- Ethylloides emdeni Verbeke, 1970

== Distribution ==
South Africa.
