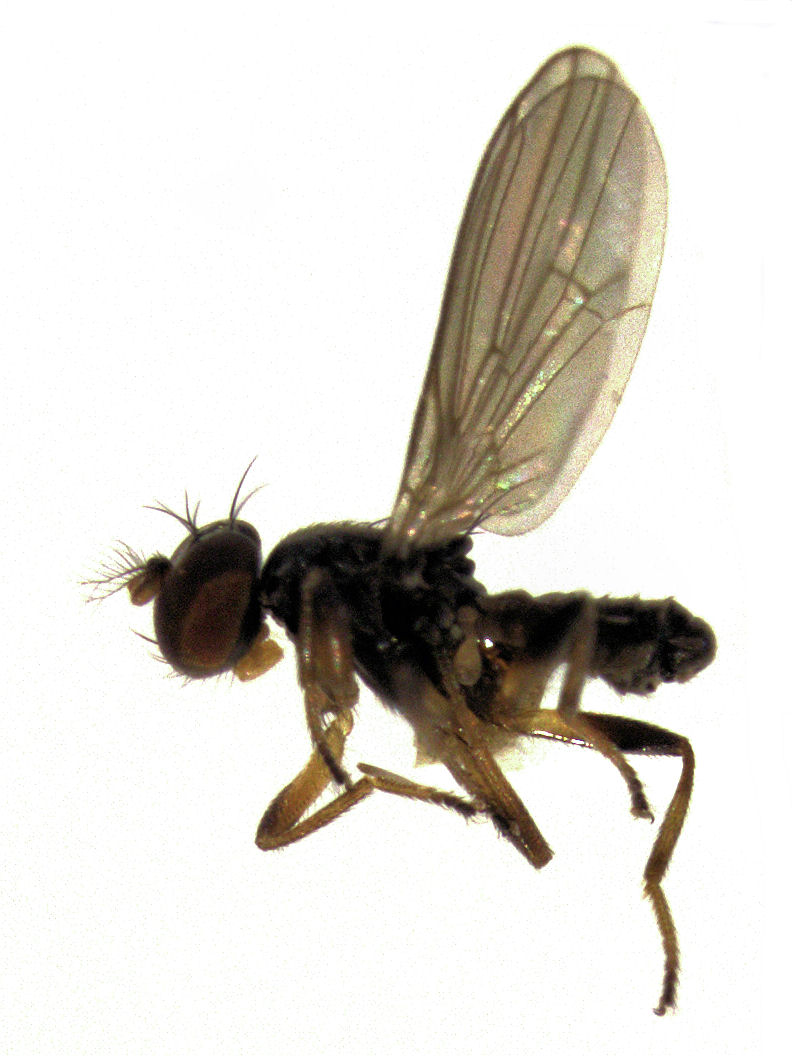
- Cyamops alessandrae (male topotype), body length about 2.3 mm

Scientific classification
- Domain: Eukaryota
- Kingdom: Animalia
- Phylum: Arthropoda
- Class: Insecta
- Order: Diptera
- Superfamily: Opomyzoidea
- Family: Periscelididae
- Subfamily: Stenomicrinae
- Genus: Cyamops; Melander, 1913

= Cyamops =

Genus of flies

Cyamops is a genus of flies.

== Species ==
- Cyamops alessandrae Mathis & Sueyoshi, 2011
- Cyamops americus Baptista & Mathis, 1994
- Cyamops australicus Hennig, 1969
- Cyamops banvaneue Baptista & Mathis, 2000
- Cyamops buenorum Baptista & Mathis, 1994
- Cyamops claudiensis Khoo, 1984
- Cyamops colombianus Baptista & Mathis, 1994
- Cyamops crosbyi Mathis & Sueyoshi, 2011
- Cyamops dayi Khoo, 1984
- Cyamops delta Khoo, 1984
- Cyamops fasciatus Baptista & Mathis, 1994
- Cyamops femobrunneus Grimaldi, 2009
- Cyamops femoctenidius Grimaldi, 2009
- Cyamops femoratus Baptista & Mathis, 2000
- Cyamops fiji Baptista & Mathis, 2000
- Cyamops freidbergi Baptista & Mathis, 2000
- Cyamops fumipennis Papp, 2006
- Cyamops funkae Baptista & Mathis, 2000
- Cyamops halteratus Sabrosky, 1958
- Cyamops hotei Sueyoshi, 2004
- Cyamops imitatus Sturtevant, 1954
- Cyamops kaplanae Baptista & Mathis, 2000
- Cyamops laos Baptista & Mathis, 2000
- Cyamops micronesicus Baptista & Mathis, 2000
- Cyamops nebulosus Melander, 1913
- Cyamops neotropicus Hennig, 1969
- Cyamops nigeriensis Baptista & Mathis, 2000
- Cyamops papuensis Baptista & Mathis, 2000
- Cyamops pectinatus Khoo, 1984
- Cyamops sabroskyi Baptista & Mathis, 1996
- Cyamops samoensis Baptista & Mathis, 2000
- Cyamops truncatus Khoo, 1984
