= Gynandromyia =

Scientific classification
- Kingdom: Animalia
- Phylum: Arthropoda
- Clade: Pancrustacea
- Class: Insecta
- Order: Diptera
- Family: Tachinidae
- Subfamily: Exoristinae
- Tribe: Ethillini
- Genus: Gynandromyia; Bezzi, 1923

Type species
- Gynandromyia seychellensis Bezzi, 1923

Synonyms
- Trypherosoma Verbeke, 1962; Zelindomyia Verbeke, 1962; Zenilliana Curran, 1927

Genus of flies

Gynandromyia is a genus of flies in the family Tachinidae.

== Species ==
- Gynandromyia bafwankei Verbeke, 1962
- Gynandromyia basilewskyi (Verbeke, 1960)
- Gynandromyia crypta (Verbeke, 1962)
- Gynandromyia fumigatum (Verbeke, 1962)
- Gynandromyia gilvum (Verbeke, 1962)
- Gynandromyia grossa (Verbeke, 1962)
- Gynandromyia habilis (Brauer & von Berganstamm, 1891)
- Gynandromyia invaginata (Villeneuve, 1939)
- Gynandromyia kibatiana Verbeke, 1962
- Gynandromyia longicornis (Sun & Zhao, 1992)
- Gynandromyia mesnili Verbeke, 1962
- Gynandromyia prima Verbeke, 1962
- Gynandromyia saegeri Verbeke, 1962
- Gynandromyia seychellensis Bezzi, 1923
