= Prosethilla =

Scientific classification
- Kingdom: Animalia
- Phylum: Arthropoda
- Class: Insecta
- Order: Diptera
- Family: Tachinidae
- Subfamily: Exoristinae
- Tribe: Ethillini
- Genus: Prosethilla; Herting, 1984

Type species
- Exorista kramerella Stein, 1924

Synonyms
- Chaetinella Mesnil, 1949

Genus of flies

Prosethilla is a genus of flies in the family Tachinidae.

== Species ==
- Prosethilla kramerella (Stein, 1924)

== Distribution ==
Hungary, Slovakia, Austria, Belgium, France, Germany, Netherlands, Switzerland, Russia.
