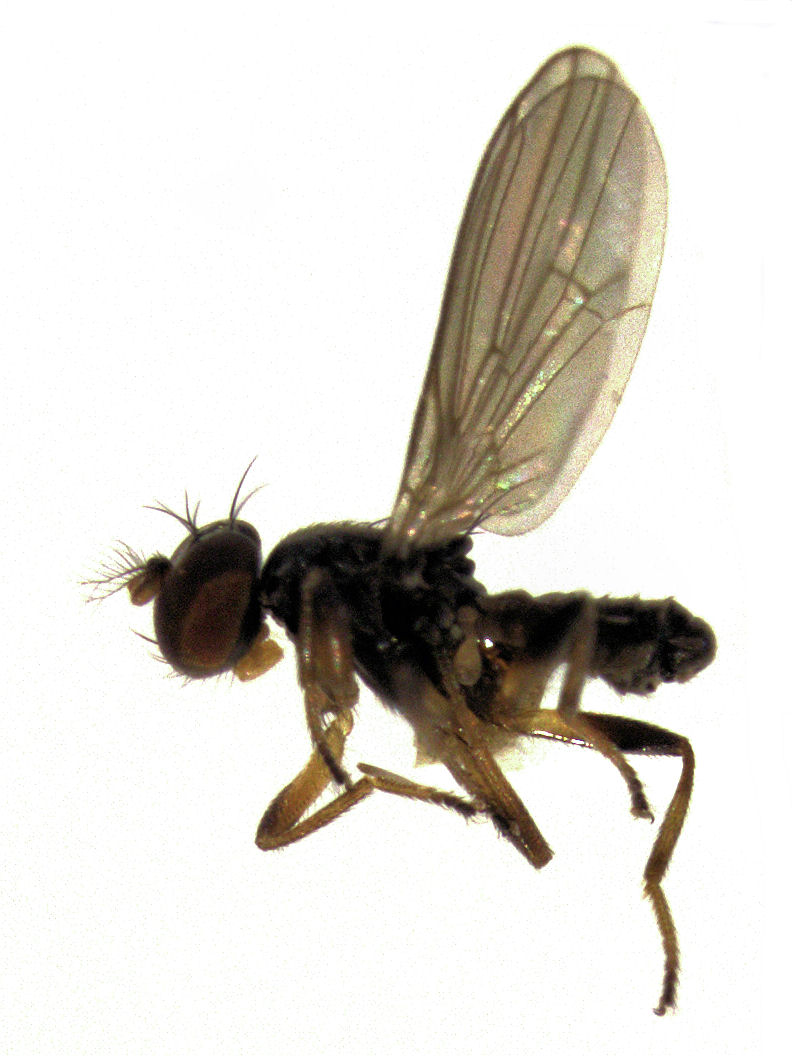
- Cyamops alessandrae (male topotype), body length about 2.3 mm

Scientific classification
- Kingdom: Animalia
- Phylum: Arthropoda
- Class: Insecta
- Order: Diptera
- Family: Periscelididae
- Genus: Cyamops
- Species: C. alessandrae

Binomial name
- Cyamops alessandrae Mathis & Sueyoshi, 2011

= Cyamops alessandrae =

Species of fly

Cyamops alessandrae is a species of fly from New Zealand.
