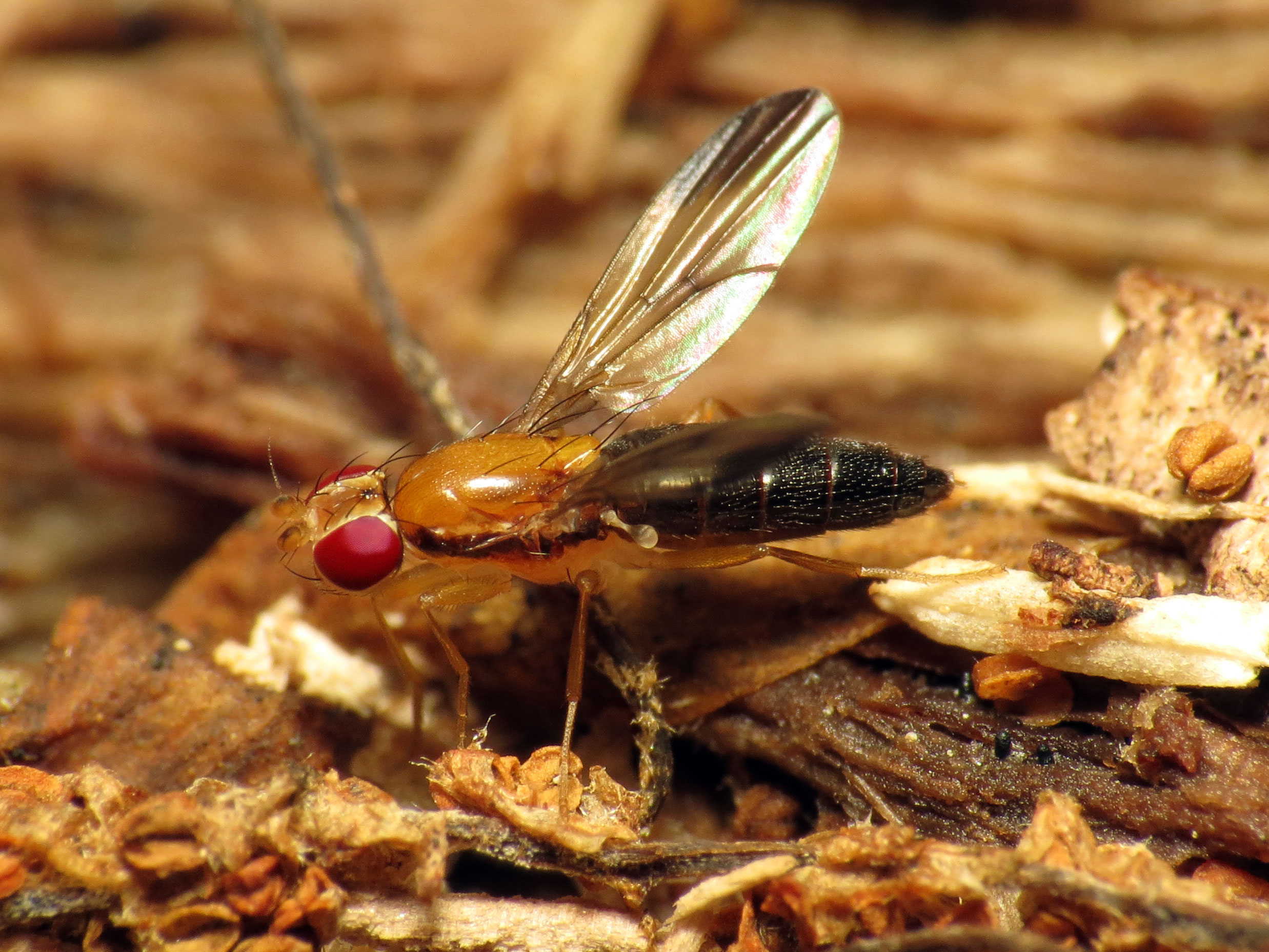

Scientific classification
- Domain: Eukaryota
- Kingdom: Animalia
- Phylum: Arthropoda
- Class: Insecta
- Order: Diptera
- Family: Clusiidae
- Genus: Clusiodes; Coquillett, 1904

= Clusiodes =

Genus of flies

Clusiodes is a genus of flies in the family Clusiidae. There are at least 70 described species in the genus Clusiodes.

== Species ==
These 70 species belong to the genus Clusiodes:

- Clusiodes aberrans Frey, 1928
- Clusiodes albimanus (Meigen, 1830)
- Clusiodes americanus Malloch, 1922
- Clusiodes angulosus Sueyoshi, 2006
- Clusiodes apicalis (Zetterstedt, 1848)
- Clusiodes apiculatus Malloch, 1922
- Clusiodes argutus McAlpine, 1960
- Clusiodes ater Melander & Argo, 1924
- Clusiodes atra Melander & Argo
- Clusiodes bisetosa Mamaev, 1974
- Clusiodes bismarckensis Sasakawa, 1974
- Clusiodes caestus Caloren & Marshall, 1998
- Clusiodes caledonicus Collin, 1912
- Clusiodes chaetostylotis Sasakawa, 1987
- Clusiodes clandestinus Caloren & Marshall, 1998
- Clusiodes clarus McAlpine, 1960
- Clusiodes coconino Caloren & Marshall, 1998
- Clusiodes dasytus Sasakawa, 1987
- Clusiodes discostylus Sueyoshi, 2006
- Clusiodes eremnos Caloren & Marshall, 1998
- Clusiodes femoratus Sasakawa, 1987
- Clusiodes flaveolus Mamaev, 1974
- Clusiodes formosana Hennig, 1938
- Clusiodes freyi Tuomikoski, 1933
- Clusiodes gentilis Collin, 1912
- Clusiodes geomyzinus (Fallen, 1823)
- Clusiodes gladiator McAlpine, 1960
- Clusiodes gracilolobus Caloren & Marshall, 1998
- Clusiodes iotoides Sasakawa, 1990
- Clusiodes johnsoni Malloch, 1922
- Clusiodes kinetrolicros Caloren & Marshall, 1998
- Clusiodes leptapodemus Caloren & Marshall, 1998
- Clusiodes leucopeza Frey, 1960
- Clusiodes marginalis Sasakawa, 1987
- Clusiodes megaspilos McAlpine, 1960
- Clusiodes megastylotis Sasakawa, 1987
- Clusiodes melanospilus Sasakawa, 1987
- Clusiodes melanostoma (Loew, 1922)
- Clusiodes melanostomus Loew, 1864
- Clusiodes microcerca Stackelberg, 1955
- Clusiodes microcerus Stackelberg, 1955
- Clusiodes mirabilis Frey, 1928
- Clusiodes napo Caloren & Marshall, 1998
- Clusiodes niger Melander & Argo, 1924
- Clusiodes nigra Melander & Argo
- Clusiodes nigriceps McAlpine, 1960
- Clusiodes nigrifrons Frey, 1960
- Clusiodes nitidus Melander & Argo, 1924
- Clusiodes notatus Sasakawa, 1987
- Clusiodes nubila Meigen, 1830
- Clusiodes obscuripennis Frey, 1960
- Clusiodes orbitalis Malloch, 1922
- Clusiodes phrenzinus Caloren & Marshall, 1998
- Clusiodes pictipes (Zetterstedt, 1855)
- Clusiodes plumipes Sasakawa, 1987
- Clusiodes plumosus Sasakawa, 1964
- Clusiodes pterygion Caloren & Marshall, 1998
- Clusiodes punctifrons Frey, 1960
- Clusiodes quatuorsetosa Mamaev, 1974
- Clusiodes ruficollis (Meigen, 1830)
- Clusiodes saopaulo Caloren & Marshall, 1998
- Clusiodes spinos Caloren & Marshall, 1998
- Clusiodes stimulator Caloren & Marshall, 1998
- Clusiodes terminalis Melander & Argo, 1924
- Clusiodes tobi Sueyoshi, 2006
- Clusiodes tuomikoskii Mamaev, 1974
- Clusiodes unica Mamaev, 1974
- Clusiodes usikumuri Sueyoshi, 2006
- Clusiodes verticalis Collin, 1912
- † Clusiodes petreficata Statz, 1940
