= Calliethilla =

Scientific classification
- Kingdom: Animalia
- Phylum: Arthropoda
- Class: Insecta
- Order: Diptera
- Family: Tachinidae
- Subfamily: Exoristinae
- Tribe: Ethillini
- Genus: Calliethilla; Shima, 1979

Type species
- Calliethilla caerulea Shima, 1979

Genus of flies

Calliethilla is a genus of flies in the family Tachinidae.

== Species ==
- Calliethilla caerulea Shima, 1979
- Calliethilla hirta Cerretti, 2012
