= Mycteromyiella =

Scientific classification
- Kingdom: Animalia
- Phylum: Arthropoda
- Class: Insecta
- Order: Diptera
- Family: Tachinidae
- Subfamily: Exoristinae
- Tribe: Ethillini
- Genus: Mycteromyiella; Mesnil, 1966

Type species
- Mycteromyiella laetifica Mesnil, 1950

Synonyms
- Mycteromyia Mesnil, 1950

Genus of flies

Mycteromyiella is a genus of flies in the family Tachinidae.

== Species ==
- Mycteromyiella laetifica (Mesnil, 1950)
- Mycteromyiella marginalis Shima, 1976
- Mycteromyiella obscura Shima, 1976
- Mycteromyiella papuana (Meijere, 1906)
- Mycteromyiella phasmatophaga Crosskey, 1968
- Mycteromyiella tenuiseta Shima, 1976
