= Catocala amnonfreidbergi =

Scientific classification
- Kingdom: Animalia
- Phylum: Arthropoda
- Class: Insecta
- Order: Lepidoptera
- Superfamily: Noctuoidea
- Family: Erebidae
- Genus: Catocala
- Species: C. amnonfreidbergi

Binomial name
- Catocala amnonfreidbergi Kravchenko et al., 2008

Species of moth

Catocala amnonfreidbergi is a moth of the family Erebidae. It is endemic to the Levant.

The wingspan is about 73 mm. Adults are on wing in July. There is probably one generation per year.
