= Amnonia =

Scientific classification
- Kingdom: Animalia
- Phylum: Arthropoda
- Class: Insecta
- Order: Diptera
- Family: Tachinidae
- Subfamily: Exoristinae
- Tribe: Ethillini
- Genus: Amnonia; Kugler, 1971

Type species
- Amnonia carmelitana Kugler, 1971

Genus of flies

Amnonia is a genus of flies in the family Tachinidae.

== Species ==
- Amnonia carmelitana Kugler, 1971
- Amnonia deemingi Zeegers, 2010
