= Françoise Beaucournu-Saguez =

French entomologist

- Born: Saguez; 1936
- Died: 11 August 2000 (aged 63–64)
- Citizenship: France
- Spouse: Jean-Claude Beaucournu
- Scientific career
- Fields: Entomology
- Institutions: University of Rennes

Françoise Beaucournu-Saguez (1936–11 August 2000) was a French entomologist who specialized in blackfly research.

== Biography ==
Beaucournu-Saguez published many studies on the blackflies (simuliids) of western Europe, North Africa and the Middle East from 1972 to 1992) with much of her research resulting from her personal fieldwork in France, Spain, Portugal and Morocco. According to an obituary,

It is to her that we owe the first discovery that the female of Simulium velutinum can be distinguished from that of other European species of the S. aureum group (= Eusimulium s. str.) by lacking the usual pigmented “nipple” on the spermatheca at the base of the duct1 - a character that has proved constant and very reliable for recognizing this species among otherwise inseparable females.

Her research was well known for her formal taxonomy of the Palaearctic realm, especially her descriptions of Levitinia freidbergi from ephemeral streams on the Golan Heights in Syria under Israeli Military Administration (done with Dr Yehuda Braverman who collected the studied specimens)

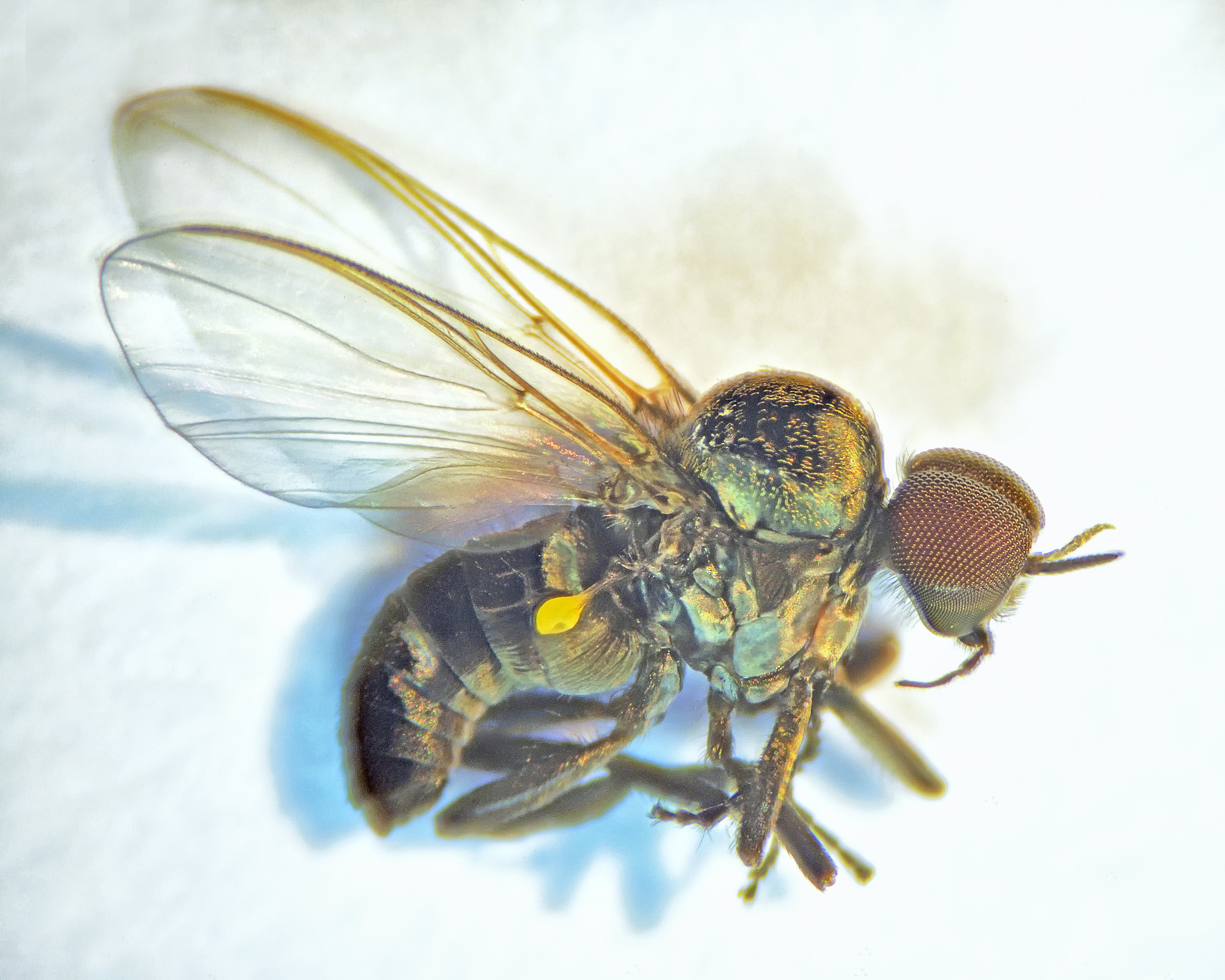
Blackfly (simuliid)

In her later years, she worked in northwest France and was associated with the Department of Parasitology and Applied Zoology at the University of Rennes.

== Private life ==
She was married to the parasitologist Jean-Claude Beaucournu (born 1934) who specialized in fleas (Siphonaptera) and who was a co-author on some of her blackfly research.

Beaucournu-Saguez died on 11 August 2000.

== Selected works ==
Her research is published under two different names: Beaucournu-Saguez, F., and Saguez, F. B.

- Pernot-Visentin, Odile; Beaucournu-Saguez, Françoise (1974). "Les Tabanidae (Diptera) de France". Publications de la Société Linnéenne de Lyon. 43 (5): 142–155. doi:10.3406/linly.1974.10119.
- Bailly-Choumara, H., & Beaucournu-Saguez, F. (1978). Contribution à l’étude des simulies du Maroc (Diptera, Simuliidae). 1. Le Rif. Bulletin de l’Institut scientifique, Rabat, 3, 121-144.
- Beaucournu-Saguez, F., & Bailly-Choumara, H. (1981). Prosimulium (Prosimulium) laamii n. sp.(Nematocera, Simuliidae), simulie nouvelle du nord du Maroc. Cahiers ORSTOM (série Entomologie médicale et Parasitologie), 19, 113-119.
- Noirtin, C., Boiteux, P., Guillet, P., Dejoux, C., Beaucournu-Saguez, F., & Mouchet, J. (1981). Les simulies, nuisance pour le bétail dans les Vosges: les origines de leur pullulation et les méthodes de lutte. Cahiers orstom, Série Entomologie Médicale et Parasitologie, 19, 101-112.
- Saguez, F. B., & Rivosecchi, L. (1982). CONTRIBUTO ALLA CONOSCENZA DEI SIMULIDI ITALIANI. XXIV: SULLA PRESENZA NELLE ALPI OCCIDENTALI (VAL D'AOSTA) DI UNA SPECIE DEL GEN. TWINNIA (SUBF. GYMNOPAIDINAE).
