= Ethillini =

Scientific classification
- Kingdom: Animalia
- Phylum: Arthropoda
- Class: Insecta
- Order: Diptera
- Family: Tachinidae
- Subfamily: Exoristinae
- Tribe: Ethillini

Tribe of flies

Ethillini is a tribe of flies in the family Tachinidae.

== Genera ==
- Amnonia Kugler, 1971
- Atylomyia Brauer, 1898
- Calliethilla Shima, 1979
- Ethilla Robineau-Desvoidy, 1863
- Ethylloides Verbeke, 1970
- Gynandromyia Bezzi, 1923
- Mycteromyiella Mesnil, 1966
- Nemorilloides Brauer & von Bergenstamm, 1891
- Neoethilla Cerretti, Wood & O'Hara, 2012
- Paratryphera Brauer & von Bergenstamm, 1891
- Phorocerosoma Townsend, 1927
- Prosethilla Herting, 1984
- Zelindopsis Anonymous, 1946
