= Sobarocephala =

- Sobarocephala flava

Scientific classification
- Domain: Eukaryota
- Kingdom: Animalia
- Phylum: Arthropoda
- Class: Insecta
- Order: Diptera
- Family: Clusiidae
- Genus: Sobarocephala; Czerny, 1903

Diversity
- at least 110 species

Genus of flies

Sobarocephala is a genus of flies in the family Clusiidae. There are more than 110 described species in Sobarocephala.

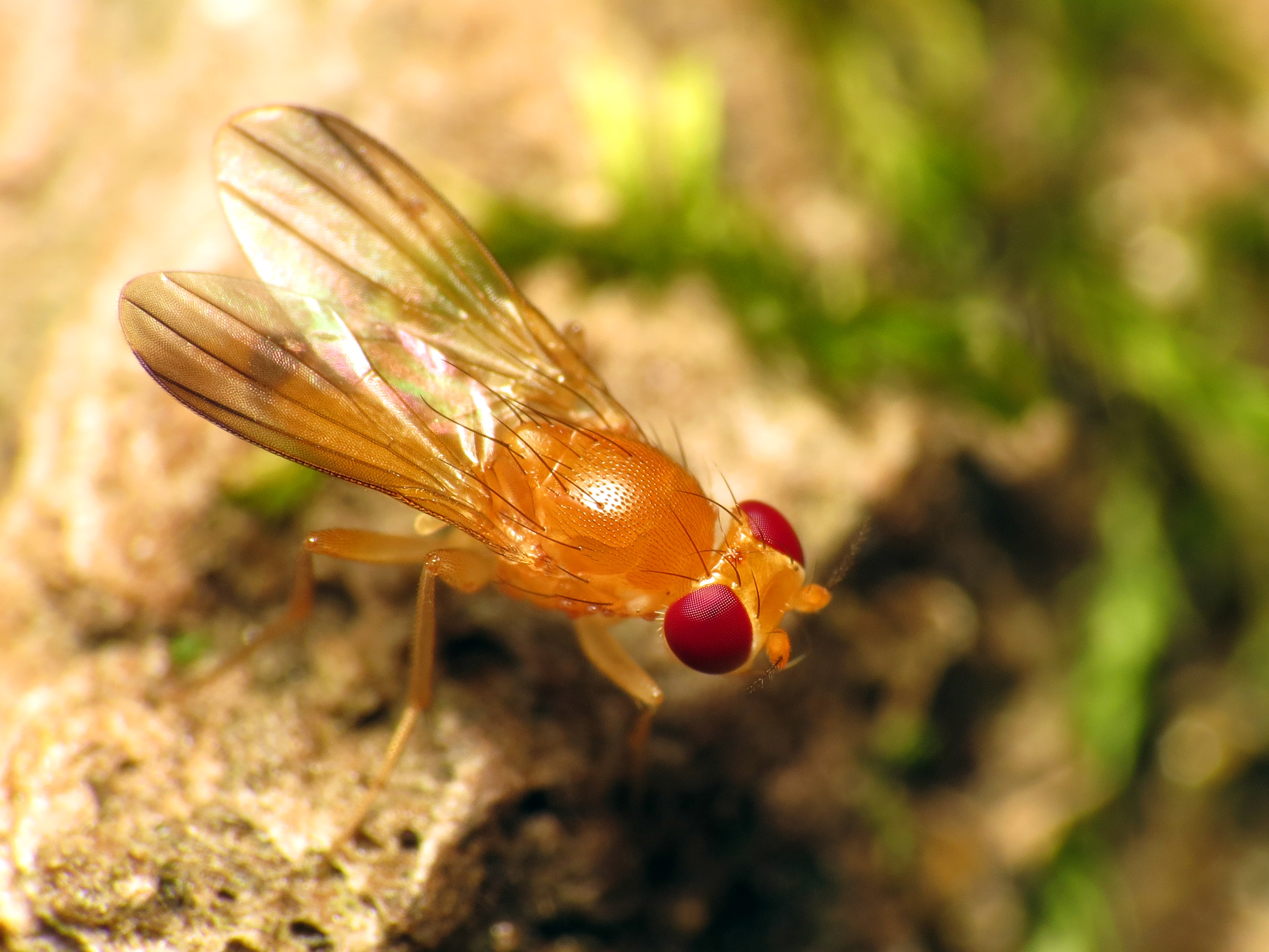
Sobarocephala flaviseta

== See also ==
- List of Sobarocephala species
