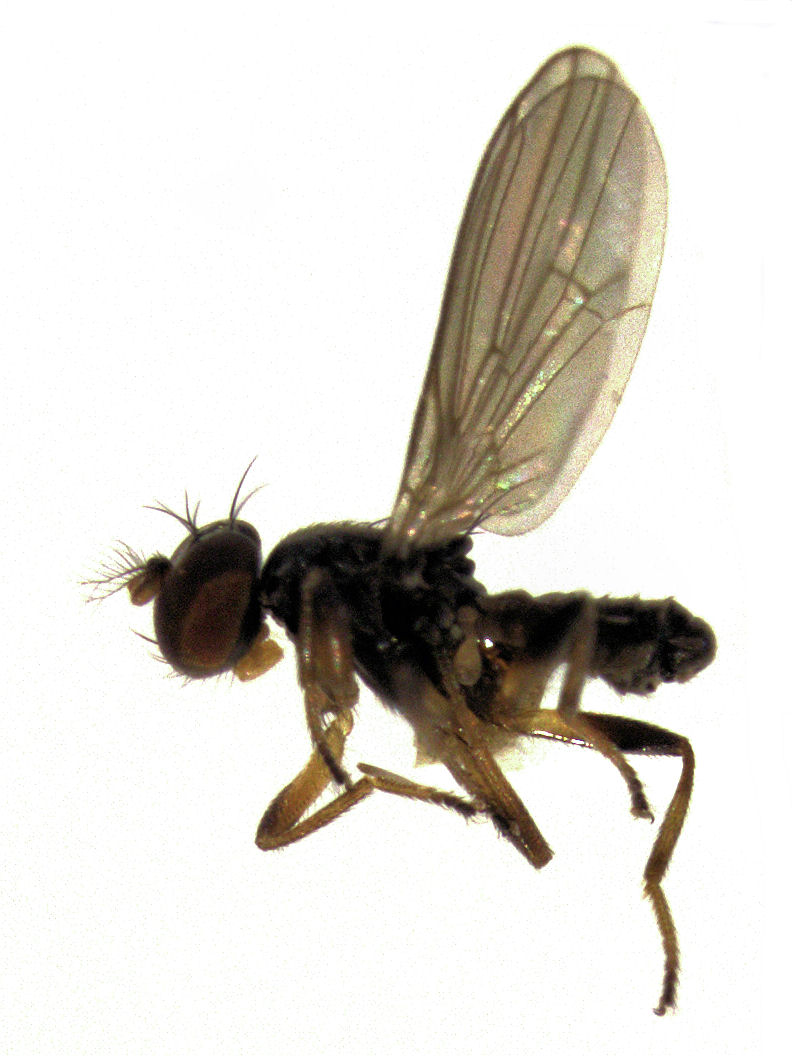
- Cyamops alessandrae

Scientific classification
- Kingdom: Animalia
- Phylum: Arthropoda
- Clade: Pancrustacea
- Class: Insecta
- Order: Diptera
- Section: Schizophora
- Subsection: Acalyptratae
- Superfamily: Opomyzoidea
- Family: Periscelididae; Oldenberg, 1914

Subfamilies
- Periscelidinae Oldenberg, 1914; Stenomicrinae Papp, 1984

Synonyms
- Periscelidae Hendel, 1916; Periscelididae Stackelberg, 1933

= Periscelididae =

Family of flies

Periscelididae is a family of flies.

== Description ==
Periscelididae are small flies, 3–4 mm long. The head is distinctly broader than high and the cheek is broad and bulging posteriorly. The postocellar bristles are present and diverging. The ocellar bristles are present, there are two orbital bristles on each side of frons, the anterior orbital bristle is directed forward and towards the median line. There is one pair of frontal bristles, curving backward. Interfrontal bristles are absent. Vibrissae (a row of vibrissa-like bristles) are well developed. On the mesonotum there are two pairs of dorsoscentral bristles. The costa is continuous (not interrupted), the subcosta is incomplete. The posterior basal wing cell and discoidal wing cell are fused and the anal vein does not reach the margin of the wings. The wing is clear or milky or with infuscated spots. Tibiae are usually banded and without dorsal preapical bristles.

== Genera ==
These 12 genera belong to the family Periscelididae:

- Periscelidinae Oldenberg, 1914
  Diopsosoma Malloch, 1932^{c g}
  Marbenia Malloch, 1931
  Neoscutops Malloch, 1926^{c g}
  Parascutops Mathis & Papp, 1992^{c g}
  Periscelis Loew, 1858^{i c g b}
  Scutops Coquillett, 1904^{c g}
- Stenomicrinae Papp, 1984
  Cyamops Melander, 1913^{i c g b}
  Myodris Lioy, 1864^{g}
  Planinasus Cresson, 1948^{c g}
  Procyamops Hoffeins & Rung, 2005^{g}
  Stenocyamops Papp, 2006^{c g}
  Stenomicra Coquilett, 1900^{i c g b}

Data sources: i = ITIS, c = Catalogue of Life, g = GBIF, b = Bugguide.net

== Species Lists ==
- West Palaearctic including Russia
- Japan
- World list

== Phylogeny ==
- Opomyzoidea
  - Clusioinea (Clusiidae)
  - - Agromyzoinea (Odiniidae+Fergusoninidae+Agromyzidae)
    - - Opomyzoinea (Opomyzidae+Anthomyzidae)
      - Asteioinea
        - Neurochaetidae+Aulacigastridae+Periscelididae
        - - Teratomyzidae
          - - Xenasteiidae
            - Asteiidae

== Read also ==
Morphology of Diptera
