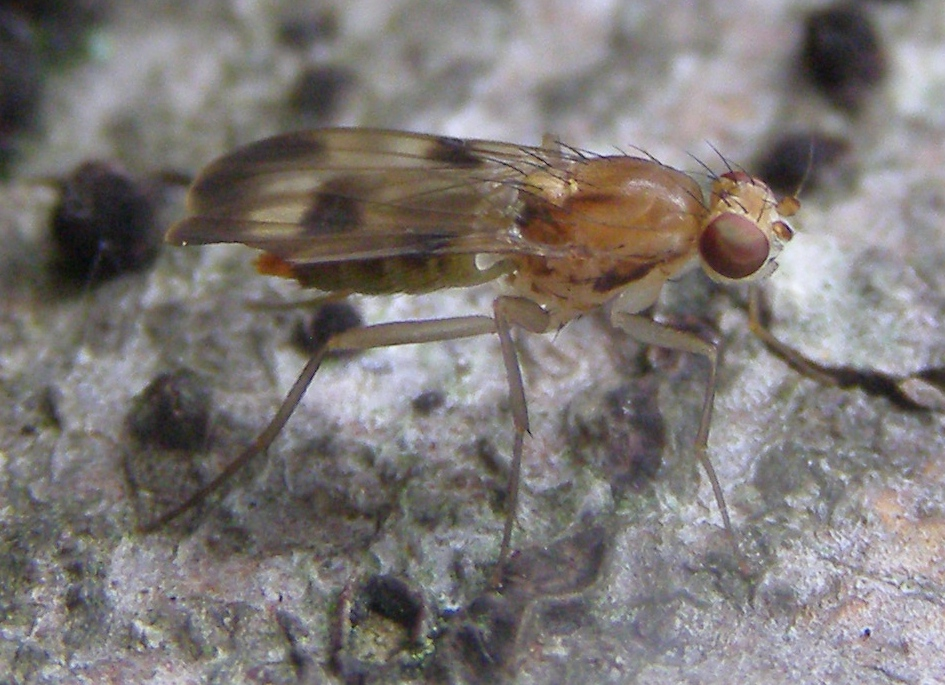
- Female Clusia tigrina

Scientific classification
- Domain: Eukaryota
- Kingdom: Animalia
- Phylum: Arthropoda
- Class: Insecta
- Order: Diptera
- Suborder: Brachycera
- Infraorder: Muscomorpha
- Clade: Eremoneura
- (unranked): Cyclorrhapha
- Section: Schizophora
- Subsection: Acalyptratae
- Superfamily: Opomyzoidea
- Family: Clusiidae

Subfamilies
- Clusiinae Frey, 1960; Clusiodinae Frey, 1960; Sobarocephalinae Lonsdale & Marshall, 2006

Synonyms
- Heteroneuridae

= Clusiidae =

Family of flies

Clusia tigrina engaged in lekking behaviour

Clusiidae or "druid flies" is a family of small (~ 3.5 mm), thin, yellow to black acalyptrate flies with a characteristic antenna (The second segment of the antennae has a triangular projection over the third segment when viewed from the outside) and with the wing usually partially infuscated. They have a cylindrical body. The head is round, the vertical plate reaches the anterior margin of the frons and the vibrissae on the head are large. The costa is interrupted near subcosta and the latter developed throughout length. Larvae are found in the bark of trees, the flies on trunks. The larvae are notable for their ability to jump. Males of many species in the subfamily Clusiodinae have been observed while engaged in lekking behaviour. There are hundreds of species in 14 genera found in all the Ecoregions, although most species occur in tropical regions. The type genus is Clusia Haliday, 1838.

== Genera ==
- Subfamily Clusiinae Frey, 1960

- Clusia Haliday, 1838.
- Melanoclusia Lonsdale & Marshall, 2008
- Phylloclusia Hendel, 1913
- Tetrameringia McAlpine, 1960

- Subfamily Clusiodinae Frey, 1960

- Allometopon Kertész, 1906
- Clusiodes Coquillett, 1904.
- Czernyola Bezzi, 1907
- Electroclusiodes^{†} Hennig, 1965
- Hendelia Czerny, 1903
- Heteromeringia Czerny, 1903

- Subfamily Sobarocephalinae Lonsdale & Marshall, 2006

- Apiochaeta Czerny, 1903
- Chaetoclusia Coquillett, 1904.
- Procerosoma Lonsdale & Marshall, 2006
- Sobarocephala Czerny, 1903

== Identification ==
- Lonsdale, O., Cheung, D.K.B. & Marshall, S.A. 2011. Key to the World genera and North American species of Clusiidae (Diptera: Schizophora). Canadian Journal of Arthropod Identification No. 14, 3 May 2011, available online at http://www.biology.ualberta.ca/bsc/ejournal/lcm_14/lcm_14.html, doi: 10.3752/cjai.2011.14
- Przemysław Trojan, 1962 Odiniidae, Clusiidae, Anthomyzidae, Opomyzidae, Tethinidae in (series) Klucze do oznaczania owadów Polski, 28,54/58; Muchowki = Diptera, 54/58 Publisher Warszawa : Państwowe Wydawnictwo Naukowe (in Polish)
