= Eozenillia =

Scientific classification
- Kingdom: Animalia
- Phylum: Arthropoda
- Class: Insecta
- Order: Diptera
- Family: Tachinidae
- Subfamily: Exoristinae
- Tribe: Exoristini
- Genus: Eozenillia; Townsend, 1926

Type species
- Eozenillia equatorialis Townsend, 1926

Genus of flies

Eozenillia is a genus of flies in the family Tachinidae. The larvae of Eozenillia equatorialis are known to be parasitoids of Mahasena corbetti.

== Species ==
- Eozenillia equatorialis Townsend, 1926
- Eozenillia psychidarum (Baranov, 1934)
- Eozenillia remota (Walker, 1853)
