= Uzi fly =

Uzi fly or uji fly is a common name for several flies that parasitize silkworms and may refer to:

- Blepharipa zebina
- Crossocosmia sericariae
- Ctenophorocera pavida
- Exorista bombycis
- Exorista sorbillans
