= Exorista dydas =

Scientific classification
- Kingdom: Animalia
- Phylum: Arthropoda
- Class: Insecta
- Order: Diptera
- Family: Tachinidae
- Subfamily: Exoristinae
- Tribe: Exoristini
- Genus: Exorista
- Species: E. dydas

Binomial name
- Exorista dydas (Walker, 1849)

Synonyms
- Tachina rufostomata Bigot, 1889; Tachina dydas Walker, 1849; Tachina spinosula Townsend, 1891; Tachina tenthredinivora Townsend, 1892

Species of fly

Exorista dydas is a species of bristle fly in the family Tachinidae.

== Distribution ==
Canada, United States.
