= Chetogena tachinomoides =

Scientific classification
- Kingdom: Animalia
- Phylum: Arthropoda
- Class: Insecta
- Order: Diptera
- Family: Tachinidae
- Subfamily: Exoristinae
- Tribe: Exoristini
- Genus: Chetogena
- Species: C. tachinomoides

Binomial name
- Chetogena tachinomoides (Townsend, 1892)

Synonyms
- Euphorocera tachinomoides Townsend, 1892

Species of flies

Chetogena tachinomoides is a species of parasitic flies in the family Tachinidae.

== Distribution ==
United States, Mexico.
