= Bessa harveyi =

Scientific classification
- Kingdom: Animalia
- Phylum: Arthropoda
- Clade: Pancrustacea
- Class: Insecta
- Order: Diptera
- Family: Tachinidae
- Subfamily: Exoristinae
- Tribe: Exoristini
- Genus: Bessa
- Species: B. harveyi

Binomial name
- Bessa harveyi (Townsend, 1892)

Synonyms
- Daeochaeta harveyi Townsend, 1892; Masicera tenthredinidarum Townsend, 1892

Species of fly

Bessa harveyi is a species of fly in the family Tachinidae. It is a parasitoid of sawflies, such as Pristiphora erichsonii and Pikonema alaskensis.

== Distribution ==
United States, Canada.
