= Phorinia aurifrons =

Scientific classification
- Kingdom: Animalia
- Phylum: Arthropoda
- Class: Insecta
- Order: Diptera
- Family: Tachinidae
- Subfamily: Exoristinae
- Tribe: Exoristini
- Genus: Phorinia
- Species: P. aurifrons

Binomial name
- Phorinia aurifrons Robineau-Desvoidy, 1830

Synonyms
- Phorocera angusta Macquart, 1851; Doria nigripalpis Rondani, 1859; Eretria excitata Robineau-Desvoidy, 1863; Phorocera delecta Meigen, 1838

Species of fly

Phorinia aurifrons is a species of bristle fly in the family Tachinidae.

== Distribution ==
Czech Republic, Estonia, Hungary, Lithuania, Moldova, Poland, Romania, Slovakia, Ukraine, Andorra, Bulgaria, Croatia, Greece, Italy, Portugal, Serbia, Spain, Austria, Belgium, France, Germany, Netherlands, Switzerland, Japan, Russia, China, Nepal.
