= P. webberi =

P. webberi may refer to:

- Paralomis webberi, a species of king crab
- Phorocera webberi, a species of bristle fly in the family Tachinidae
- Potentilla webberi, wire mousetail, a species of flowering plant in the family Rosaceae
