= Exorista rossica =

Scientific classification
- Kingdom: Animalia
- Phylum: Arthropoda
- Class: Insecta
- Order: Diptera
- Family: Tachinidae
- Subfamily: Exoristinae
- Tribe: Exoristini
- Genus: Exorista
- Species: E. rossica

Binomial name
- Exorista rossica Mesnil, 1960

Species of fly

Exorista rossica is a species of bristle fly in the family Tachinidae. It is a parasitoid of Acronicta megacephala, Euproctis chrysorrhoea, and Leucoma salicis moths.

== Distribution ==
Tajikistan, Uzbekistan, Turkey, Armenia, China, India, Taiwan.
