= Exorista mella =

Scientific classification
- Kingdom: Animalia
- Phylum: Arthropoda
- Clade: Pancrustacea
- Class: Insecta
- Order: Diptera
- Family: Tachinidae
- Subfamily: Exoristinae
- Tribe: Exoristini
- Genus: Exorista
- Species: E. mella

Binomial name
- Exorista mella (Walker, 1849)

Synonyms
- Achaetoneura fernaldi Williston & Fernald, 1896; Tachina clisiocampae Townsend, 1891; Tachina mella Walker, 1849; Tachina orgyiae LeBaron, 1871; Tachina orgyiae Townsend, 1892; Tachina orgyiarum Townsend, 1908

Species of fly

Exorista mella is a tachinid fly of the genus Ezorista within the family Tachinidae of the order Diptera. They are typically found in the United States and Canada. Within the U.S in the state of Arizona they have been found in both mountainous and agricultural regions. E. mella is a parasitoid fly, a polyphagous generalist which parasitizes a variety of hosts.

Female E. mella flies are selective when deciding on what host to parasitize. Once a host is selected a female may oviposit her eggs on the surface of the host. Larvae then burrow into the host for the remainder of their development usually killing the host once they emerge during either prepupae or pupae stage of development. Experiments in these flies have suggested that they can learn from experience that influence certain behaviors as suggest them as candidates for biocontrol agents to control certain pests.

== Description ==
Physical characteristics include having a stigmal plate that is not elevated like their protuberance, as well as a sternopleuron pertaining to the thorax on the lateral side with three bristles. Likewise, behavioral characteristics include their parasitoid tendencies. As parasitoids, E. mella typically spend most of their life growing in a host. Unlike other fly species born in a host, in E. mella, neither sex determination nor sex ratio divergence is related to host size. However, the size of adult E. mella is directly correlated with the size of the host from which the fly emerged. Thus, flies that were oviposited and burrowed alone into larger hosts were larger than those that emerged from a smaller host or one that was superparasitized. A study shows that the sex of the emerging flies does not correspond to the host size or superparasitism of the host, though the two factors influence the size of adult flies, and the larger adult flies deposit a larger number of eggs than the smaller ones. Additionally, host larvae activity has a larger impact on parasite oviposition than host larvae size.

== Distribution and habitat ==
E. mella is commonly found in the United States and in Canada. In Arizona, E. mella have been found in the mountainous regions as well as agricultural regions of southern Arizona.

== Life cycle ==
=== Larvae ===
On average, the larval development of E. mella lasts for 10 days. Larvae emerge from their eggs on the surface of their hosts, after which they burrow into the host for the remainder of their development. Delays in development occur when the host molts. If the host does not molt, larvae are able to develop within an average of 6.4 days, as opposed to an average of 12.9 days if the host does molt.

=== Pupae ===
E. mella larvae are able to emerge from any stage (i.e. prepupae and pupae) of their host during their development.

=== Longevity ===
The lifespan of adult E. mella flies varies. Males typically have an average lifespan of about 29.5 days, while females survive an average of about 38.0 to 40.6 days.

== Parental care ==
=== Preoviposition ===
The earliest recorded viable eggs in a study were from females 48 to 72 hours old, which had immediately mated after emerging. Even without having mated, newly emerged females have also been documented to be able to oviposit infertile and consequently unviable eggs. The gestation period lasts for an average of at least 2 days upon emergence from the host.

=== Oviposition ===
Female E. mella flies extend their ovipositor onto the surface of their host of choice to lay their hard-shelled eggs. On average, a female E. mella fly can oviposit about 150 eggs during her lifespan. The most an E. mella fly has been recorded to oviposit on a single host for one study was 65 eggs. Typically, the oviposition period lasts for about 24.8 days. E. mella typically oviposit on the cuticle of their host, but have also been documented to oviposit on the head capsule, setae, prolegs, and on the abdomen of hosts. Though they prefer to oviposit on live hosts, females were also observed to oviposit on the surface of dead hosts. Larger females were also observed to oviposit a greater number of eggs than smaller females.

== Parasitism ==
=== Hosts ===
As a polyphagous and generalist fly, E. mella feeds on a variety of hosts. It has been recorded to parasitize the following families of caterpillars: Arctiidae, Noctuidae, Notodontidae, Lymantriidae, and Lasiocampidae. E. mella has also been noted by one study to be one of the core three parasitoids to account for the mortality of a variety of caterpillars. Some of these hosts, such as the Apantesis incorrupta moth, have been observed to be able to fight back against parasitism by E. mella through a particular diet of plants, as well as surviving through adulthood.

=== Host selection ===
Female E. mella flies spend time browsing hosts by moving around habitats where they are likely to find hosts, such as in low shrubs and herbs that their hosts feed on. When choosing a host, the flies usually drum their feet on its body to determine if it is an adequate and living host. One experiment found that E. mella flies respond more strongly to certain characteristics of a host than others, one such characteristic being the movement of the host. The more the host moved, the faster the flies were observed to approach the host. Female E. mella flies have been found to preferentially oviposit on larger hosts. They have also been found to prefer host caterpillars that are in their late instar stage of development.

=== Experiments ===
One experiment observed more experienced flies learning and behaving in a different way than inexperienced flies. Where more experienced flies typically oviposited more eggs onto a host, experienced females were also documented to be able to recognize suitable hosts faster than inexperienced hosts and tended to oviposit on live hosts more often.

Another experiment looked into the potential of E. mella flies as biocontrol agents in agriculture for certain pests. Where parasitism of the host rarely lets the pest that is chosen as a host live. The study itself looked at the ability of flies to do so either by depositing their eggs into a host described as macro egg laying or on the plant which they feed off of described as micro egg laying. E. mella was one of a couple of flies in the study that could deposit on both the plant and the host, with parasitism having a greater percentage to occur within a host.

== Mating ==
E. mella flies have been found to mate shortly after emerging from their host, and the success rate of mating increases when the time before the formation of pairs after emergence is shorter. Both sexes have been observed to show a decline in their ability to produce viable offspring after a certain amount of time after emergence. For males, this was on average 14 days, while for females it was after 16 days of emergence. Males have been observed to have the ability to fertilize the eggs of more than one female. Thus, it is the usual case that pairs mate shortly after emerging from the host.
