= Chetogena tessellata =

Scientific classification
- Kingdom: Animalia
- Phylum: Arthropoda
- Class: Insecta
- Order: Diptera
- Family: Tachinidae
- Subfamily: Exoristinae
- Tribe: Exoristini
- Genus: Chetogena
- Species: C. tessellata

Binomial name
- Chetogena tessellata (Brauer & von Berganstamm, 1891)

Synonyms
- Tetragrapha tessellata Brauer & von Berganstamm, 1891

Species of flies

Chetogena tessellata is a species of parasitic flies in the family Tachinidae.

== Distribution ==
Cuba
