= Metaphorocera =

Scientific classification
- Kingdom: Animalia
- Phylum: Arthropoda
- Class: Insecta
- Order: Diptera
- Family: Tachinidae
- Subfamily: Exoristinae
- Tribe: Exoristini
- Genus: Metaphorocera; Thompson, 1968

Type species
- Metaphorocera maracasi Thompson, 1968

Genus of flies

Metaphorocera is a genus of flies in the family Tachinidae.

== Species ==
- Metaphorocera maracasi Thompson, 1968

== Distribution ==
Trinidad.
