= Maculosalia =

Scientific classification
- Kingdom: Animalia
- Phylum: Arthropoda
- Class: Insecta
- Order: Diptera
- Family: Tachinidae
- Subfamily: Exoristinae
- Tribe: Exoristini
- Genus: Maculosalia; Mesnil, 1946

Type species
- Deuterammobia maculosa Villeneuve, 1909

Genus of flies

Maculosalia is a genus of flies in the family Tachinidae.

== Species ==
- Maculosalia flavicercia Chao & Liu, 1986
- Maculosalia grisa Chao & Liu, 1986
- Maculosalia maculosa (Villeneuve, 1909)
