= Tachinomyia =

Scientific classification
- Kingdom: Animalia
- Phylum: Arthropoda
- Class: Insecta
- Order: Diptera
- Family: Tachinidae
- Subfamily: Exoristinae
- Tribe: Exoristini
- Genus: Tachinomyia; Townsend, 1892

Type species
- Tachinomyia robusta Townsend, 1892

Genus of flies

Tachinomyia is a genus of flies in the family Tachinidae.

== Species ==
- Tachinomyia acosta Webber, 1941
- Tachinomyia apicata Curran, 1926
- Tachinomyia cana Webber, 1941
- Tachinomyia dakotensis Webber, 1941
- Tachinomyia floridensis Townsend, 1892
- Tachinomyia montana (Smith, 1917)
- Tachinomyia nigricans Webber, 1941
- Tachinomyia panaetius (Walker, 1849)
- Tachinomyia similis (Williston, 1893)
- Tachinomyia variata Curran, 1926
