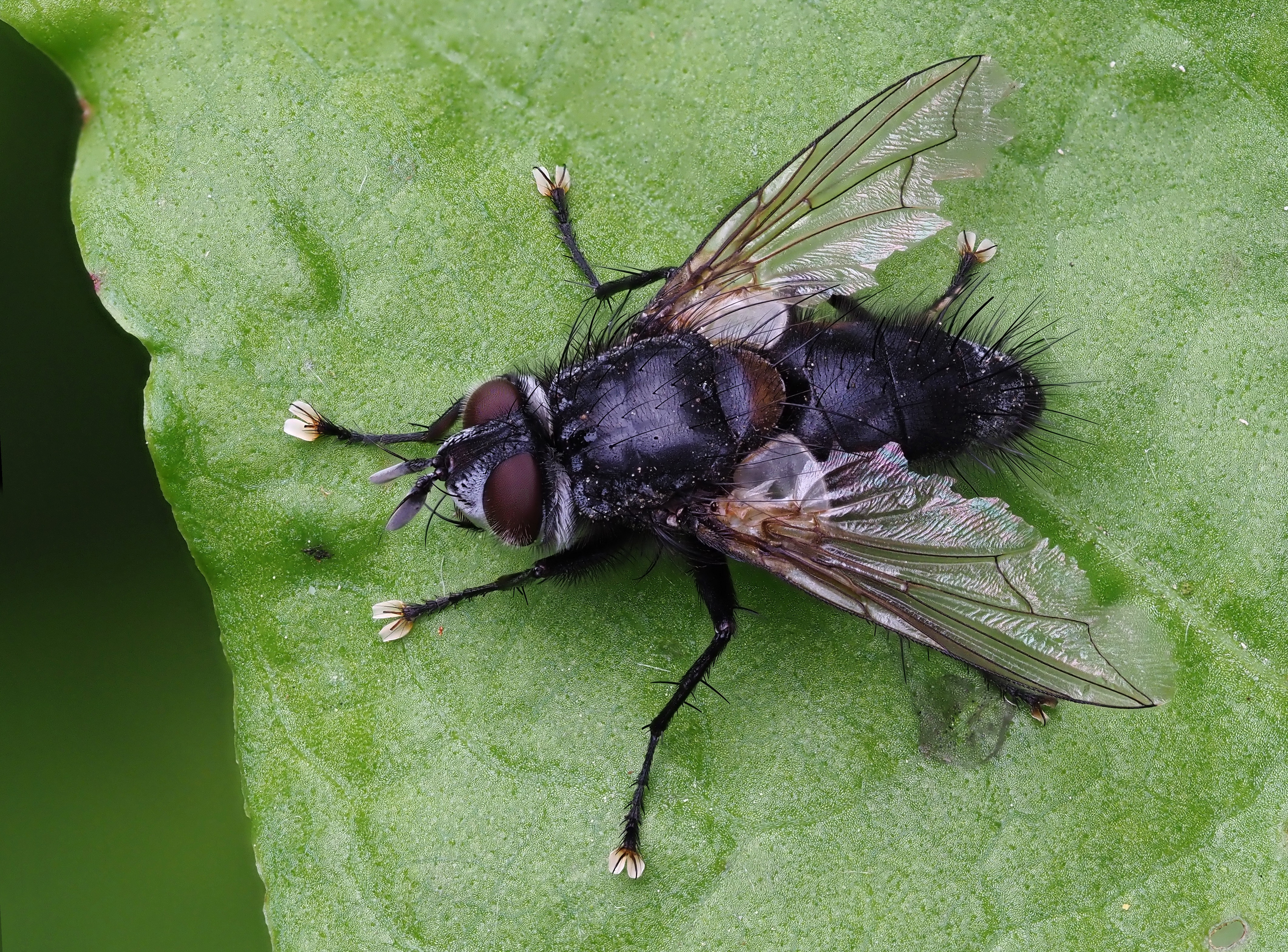

Scientific classification
- Kingdom: Animalia
- Phylum: Arthropoda
- Clade: Pancrustacea
- Class: Insecta
- Order: Diptera
- Family: Tachinidae
- Genus: Phorocera
- Species: P. assimilis

Binomial name
- Phorocera assimilis (Fallén, 1810)

= Phorocera assimilis =

Species of fly

Phorocera assimili is a species of fly of the family Tachinidae. It was described by Carl Fredrik Fallén in 1810. Its host is the Lackey moth.
