= Cydalima violalis =

Scientific classification
- Kingdom: Animalia
- Phylum: Arthropoda
- Class: Insecta
- Order: Lepidoptera
- Family: Crambidae
- Genus: Cydalima
- Species: C. violalis

Binomial name
- Cydalima violalis E. Hering, 1901

Species of moth

Cydalima violalis is a moth in the family Crambidae. It was described by E. Hering in 1901. It is found in Indonesia (Sumatra).
