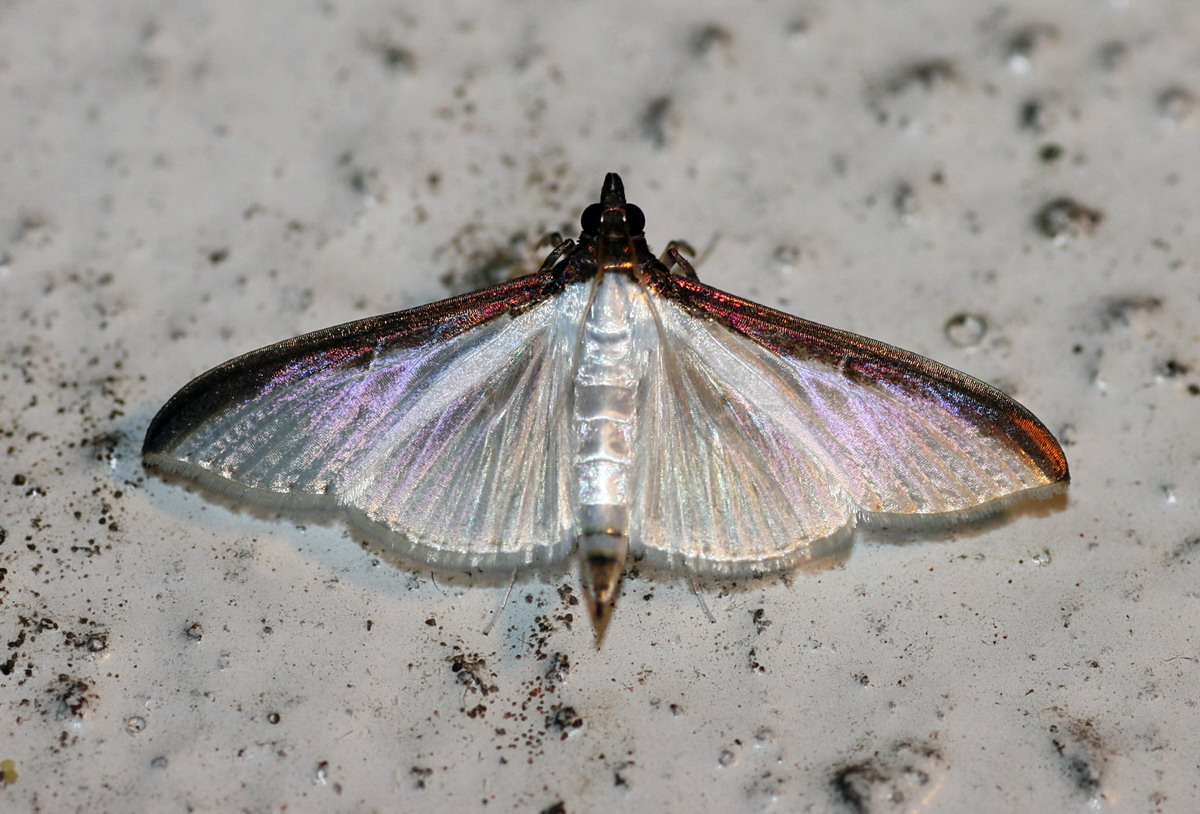

Scientific classification
- Kingdom: Animalia
- Phylum: Arthropoda
- Class: Insecta
- Order: Lepidoptera
- Family: Crambidae
- Genus: Cydalima
- Species: C. laticostalis

Binomial name
- Cydalima laticostalis (Guenée, 1854)

Synonyms
- Margarodes laticostalis Guenée, 1854; Margarodes conchylalis Guenée, 1854; Cydalima conchylalis; Margarodes nitidicostalis Guenée, 1854; Margaronia leodicealis Walker, 1859

= Cydalima laticostalis =

Species of moth

Cydalima laticostalis is a moth in the family Crambidae. It was described by Achille Guenée in 1854. It is found from India, Sri Lanka, Maldives, Burma and Malaysia to the New Hebrides. It is also found in Australia, where it has been recorded from tropical Queensland.

The wings are satin white. There is a broad brown line along the costa of the forewings.
