= Cydalima joiceyi =

Scientific classification
- Kingdom: Animalia
- Phylum: Arthropoda
- Class: Insecta
- Order: Lepidoptera
- Family: Crambidae
- Genus: Cydalima
- Species: C. joiceyi

Binomial name
- Cydalima joiceyi (Janse, 1924)

Synonyms
- Margaronia; (Sisyrophora) joiceyi Janse, 1924

Species of moth

Cydalima joiceyi is a moth in the family Crambidae. It was described by Anthonie Johannes Theodorus Janse in 1924. It is found on Seram in Indonesia.
