= Stomatotachina =

Scientific classification
- Kingdom: Animalia
- Phylum: Arthropoda
- Class: Insecta
- Order: Diptera
- Family: Tachinidae
- Subfamily: Exoristinae
- Tribe: Exoristini
- Genus: Stomatotachina; Townsend, 1931

Type species
- Stomatotachina splendida Townsend, 1931

Genus of flies

Stomatotachina is a genus of flies in the family Tachinidae.

== Species ==
- Stomatotachina porteri (Brèthes, 1920)

== Distribution ==
Chile.
