= Chaetoria =

Scientific classification
- Kingdom: Animalia
- Phylum: Arthropoda
- Class: Insecta
- Order: Diptera
- Family: Tachinidae
- Subfamily: Exoristinae
- Tribe: Exoristini
- Genus: Chaetoria; Becker, 1908

Type species
- Chaetoria stylata Becker, 1908

Synonyms
- Clistorrhinia Bezzi & Lamb, 1926; Phrynactia Townsend, 1926; Vorina Malloch, 1930

Genus of flies

Chaetoria is a genus of flies in the family Tachinidae.

== Species ==
- Chaetoria aurifrons (Bezzi, 1926)
- Chaetoria micronyx Mesnil, 1971
- Chaetoria setibasis (Malloch, 1930)
- Chaetoria spinicosta (Thomson, 1869)
- Chaetoria stylata Becker, 1908
