= Phorinia =

Scientific classification
- Kingdom: Animalia
- Phylum: Arthropoda
- Class: Insecta
- Order: Diptera
- Family: Tachinidae
- Subfamily: Exoristinae
- Tribe: Exoristini
- Genus: Phorinia; Robineau-Desvoidy, 1830

Type species
- Phorinia aurifrons Robineau-Desvoidy, 1830

Synonyms
- Bessiola Mesnil, 1960; Eretria Robineau-Desvoidy, 1863

Genus of flies

Phorinia is a genus of flies in the family Tachinidae.

== Species ==
- Phorinia aduncata Tachi & Shima, 2006
- Phorinia atypica Curran, 1927
- Phorinia aurifrons Robineau-Desvoidy, 1830
- Phorinia australiana Tachi & Shima, 2006
- Phorinia bifurcate Tachi & Shima, 2006
- Phorinia breviata Tachi & Shima, 2006
- Phorinia cinctella Mesnil, 1971
- Phorinia convexa Tachi & Shima, 2006
- Phorinia denticulata Tachi & Shima, 2006
- Phorinia flava Tachi & Shima, 2006
- Phorinia gracilis Tachi & Shima, 2006
- Phorinia insignita Tachi & Shima, 2006
- Phorinia longiseta Tachi & Shima, 2006
- Phorinia minuta Tachi & Shima, 2006
- Phorinia nigra Lahiri, 2006
- Phorinia oblimata (Mesnil, 1944)
- Phorinia occidentalis Tachi & Shima, 2006
- Phorinia orientalis Tachi & Shima, 2006
- Phorinia pruinovitta Chao & Liu, 1986
- Phorinia pulverulenta (Karsch, 1886)
- Phorinia pumila (Mesnil, 1971)
- Phorinia quadrata Tachi & Shima, 2006
- Phorinia sadista (Curran, 1940)
- Phorinia spinulosa Tachi & Shima, 2006
- Phorinia verritus (Walker, 1849)
