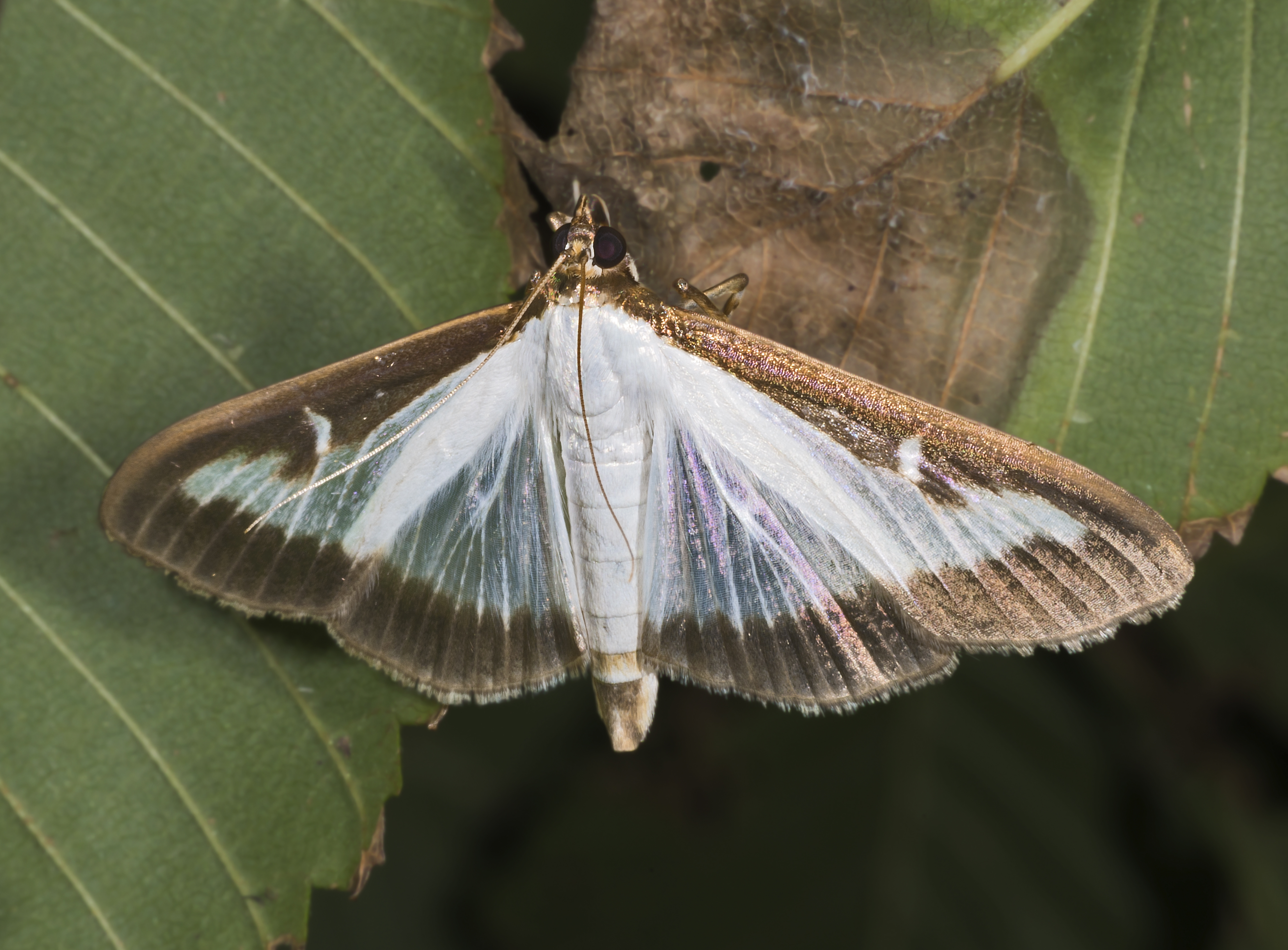

Scientific classification
- Kingdom: Animalia
- Phylum: Arthropoda
- Clade: Pancrustacea
- Class: Insecta
- Order: Lepidoptera
- Family: Crambidae
- Genus: Cydalima
- Species: C. perspectalis

Binomial name
- Cydalima perspectalis (Walker, 1859)

Synonyms
- Phakellura perspectalis Walker, 1859; Glyphodes perspectalis; Diaphania perspectalis; Palpita perspectalis; Neoglyphodes perspectalis; Glyphodes albifuscalis Hampson, 1899; Phacellura advenalis Lederer, 1863

= Cydalima perspectalis =

Box tree moth

Species of moth

Cydalima perspectalis, the box moth or box tree moth, is a species of moth of the family Crambidae that feeds on box. It was first described by Francis Walker, the English entomologist, in 1859. It is native to China, Taiwan, Korea, and India; its native status in Japan and the Russian far east is uncertain, some sources saying native, but others saying possibly invasive there. It has invaded Europe; first recorded in Germany in 2006, then Great Britain, the Netherlands, and Switzerland in 2007, France and Austria in 2009, Hungary in 2011, then Romania in 2012, Denmark in 2013, and Spain in 2014. It has also been recorded in Slovakia, Belgium, and Croatia.

During preparations for the 2014 Winter Olympics in 2012, it was introduced accidentally from Italy to Sochi, European Russia, with planting stock of Buxus sempervirens. The following year it defoliated local native box populations extensively.

It was recorded in Ontario, Canada in August 2018 and in the eastern United States in May 2021.

== Description ==
The eggs are 1 mm in diameter, flat, pale yellow-green, and placed in clusters under green leaves without herbivory present. The larvae emerging from the egg are about 1–2 mm long. Larval development brings them to about 35–40 mm at maximum at four weeks. There is some shrinkage at the beginning of the nymphosis, the pupae being 25–30 mm long, first green with browning longitudinal lines, then more and more brownish. The wingspan of the adult is 40–45 mm. Two variants are observed; the commonest is mostly white with a light brown border, while the other is almost entirely light brown with slight purplish tone, and a white spot near the centre of the forewing. The frequency of the brown variant in its native region is not reported; it forms up to 10% of the population in Europe, but has not been reported in North America.

== Life cycle ==
In Britain, there are two generations per year with adults on the wing from June to early August, and again from September to November; three generations per year have been recorded in southwest Germany. In the warmest parts of the European importation area, with cold conditions coming late in the year, there might be sometimes four generations per year. The species overwinters as a juvenile cocooned larva (about 5–10 mm long), protected in an hibernarium made of two Buxus leaves solidly joined by silk.

== Host plant ==
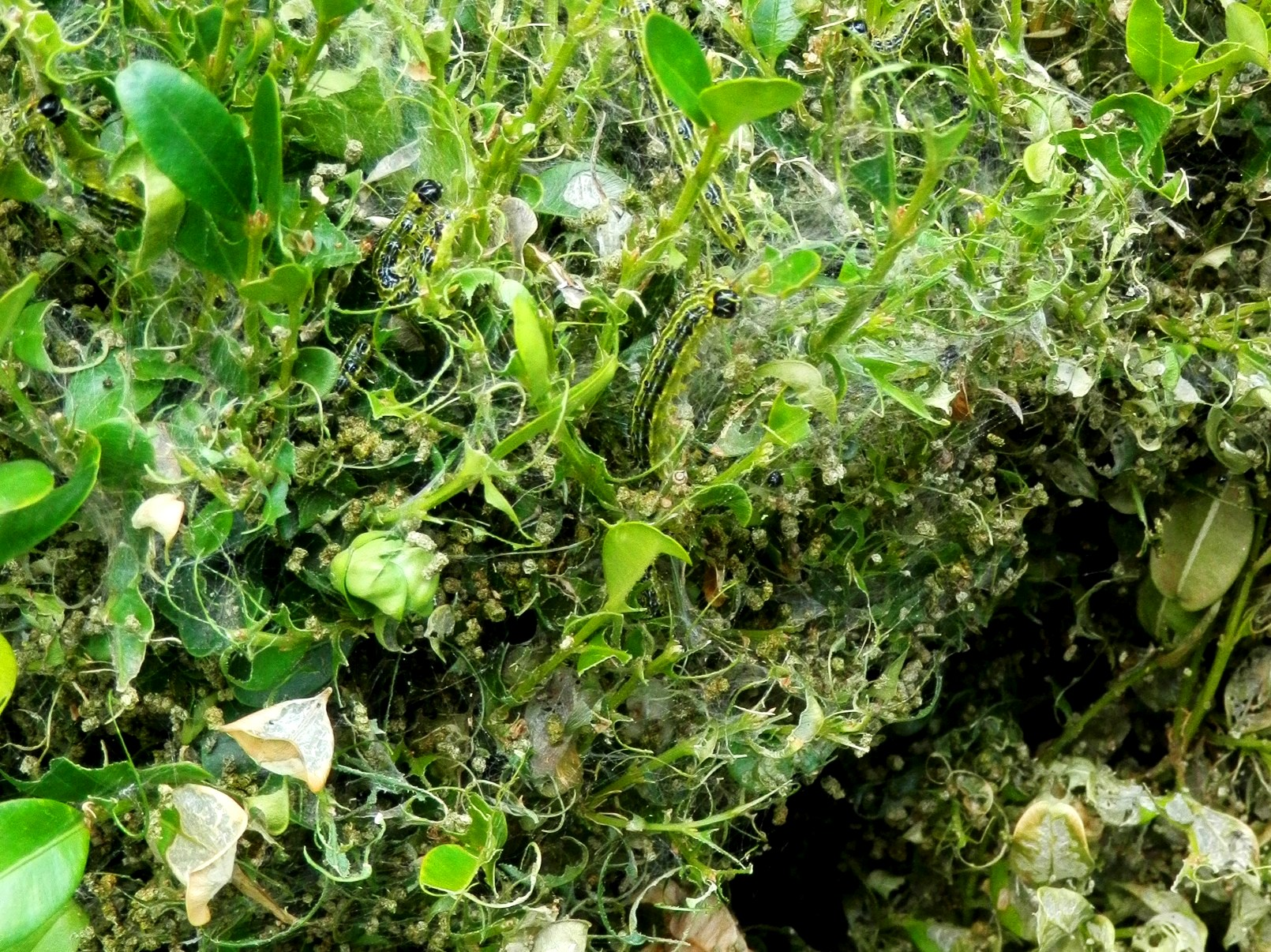
Larval feeding damage - only the contour of the leaves and frass is left.

The larvae feed on the leaves and shoots of box (Buxus) species. Young larvae often eat only the upper part of the leaf, leaving the tougher veins and the waxy lower epithelium as if the leaves had been peeled. These peeled leaves eventually die. The young, newly hatched feed on small portions of the leaves, but as they grow older and larger, the more the larvae eat, therefore doing more damage.

Old larvae are the most damaging; they massively and completely eat the leaves, sometimes leaving a thin part at the contour and centre of the leaf. Green ball-shaped frass can usually be seen on host plants.

== Natural regulation or predation ==
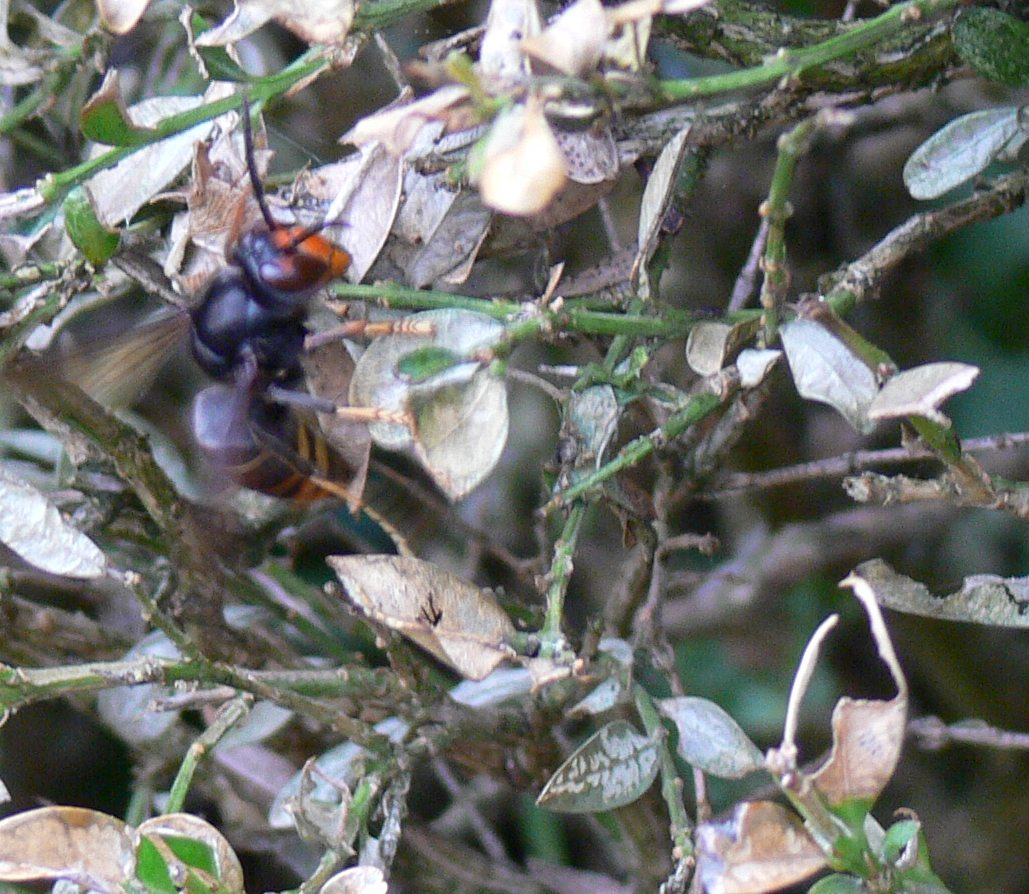
An Asian hornet (Vespa velutina) in active search of Cydalima perspectalis larvae on an infested box bush.

In the area of origin (Asia) natural regulation occurs, as witnessed by its being non-destructive there. In the areas of Europe where the moth has been introduced, the damage is very serious because natural regulation does not occur at a significant level. However, in areas of Europe where the Asian hornet (Vespa velutina) was present prior to the introduction of C. perspectalis, some degree of predation by the wasp has been observed (not confirmed by scientific and clear results). In the south-west of France, the first place where V. velutina was introduced to Europe in 2004 (C. perspectalis invaded this area in 2012), V. velutina is able to capture small larvae, and larvae preparing for the nymphosis in their cocoon.

Research is being conducted for the suitability of parasitoid species, such as the tachinid Exorista larvarum as a biological control agent.

== Control measures ==
Pheromone traps (attracting adult males) are able to prevent impregnation of adult females and therefore control the severity of the damage. A more important proportion of sterile eggs is deposited by adult females. The selectivity of the pheromone is very good, and useful indigenous species are not attracted. Pheromone traps must be in place from March–April to October–November.

Bacillus thuringiensis kurstaki is a bacterium which produces an insect-specific endotoxin which perforates the caterpillars' gut lining, leading to paralysis and death.

Nematodes also have an action on the digestive system of larvae (difficult to adopt on this moth).

Insecticides are not very useful, as they could be a potential waste of resources if these are unwarranted, and there are also secondary harmful effects. Some may even kill beneficial mites on the plants that keep plant feeding mites in check.

Insecticide, Bacillus and nematode treatments must be repeated three times at an interval of about ten days, because they mostly affect young larvae. Synthetic insecticides such as cypermethrin and deltamethrin are efficient, but must be thoroughly applied inside the bush and under leaves. Natural pyrethrin insecticides, extracted from Chrysanthemum and mixed with colza oil, can also be used. Spinosad, based on chemical compounds found in a bacterium, is also efficient.

The species has become widespread in London and surrounding areas and has been ranked as a top garden pest in Great Britain. The Royal Horticultural Society provides an online survey to keep track of the pest.

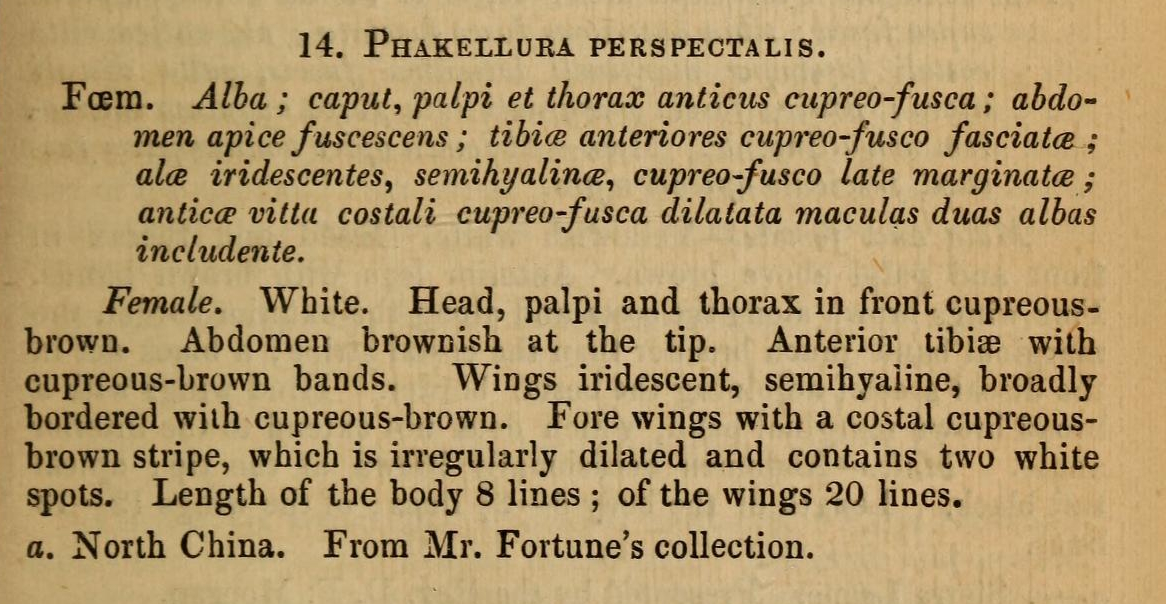
The first description, Walker 1859

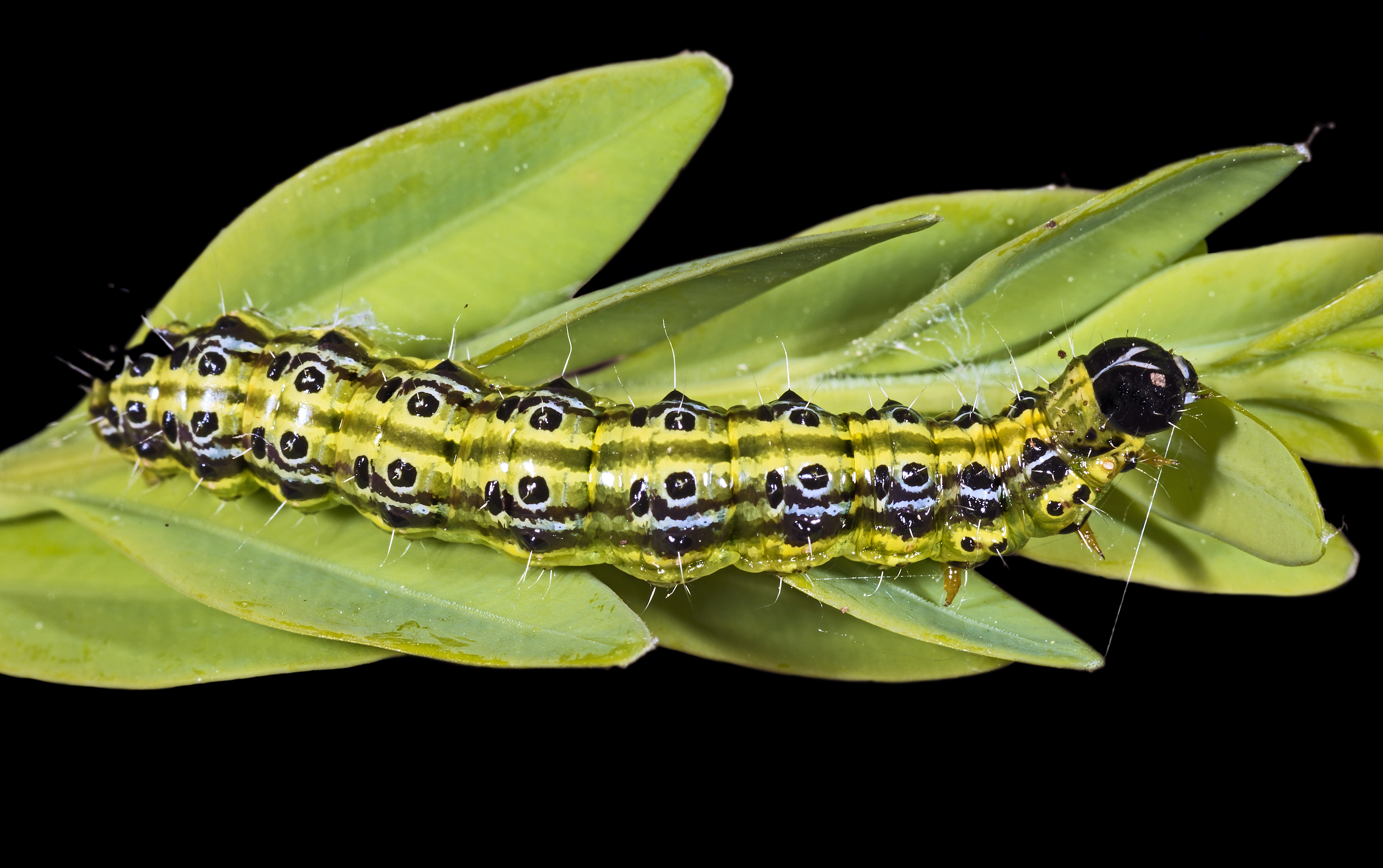
Larva, in the early stages

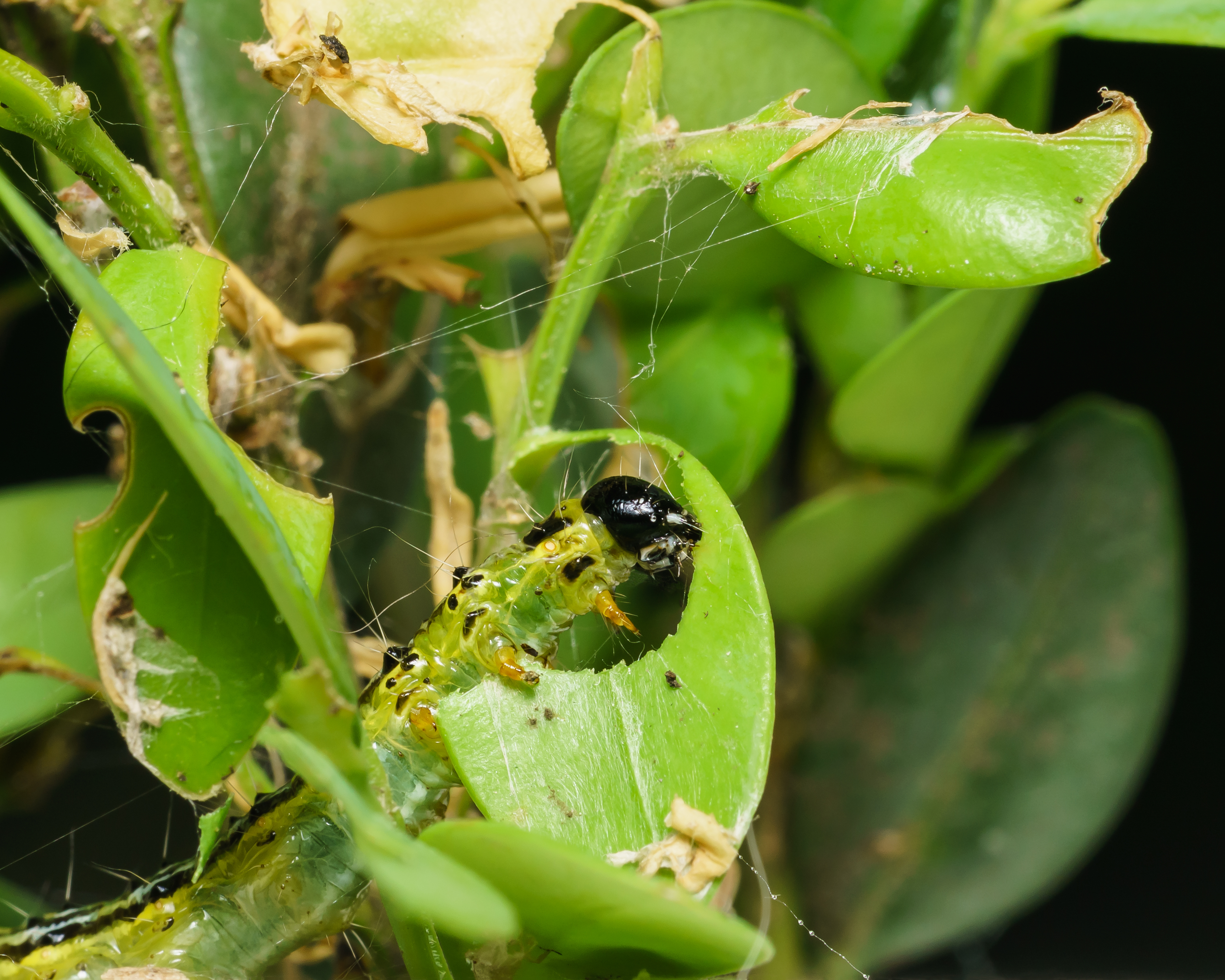
Closeup: larva feeding on box tree leaf

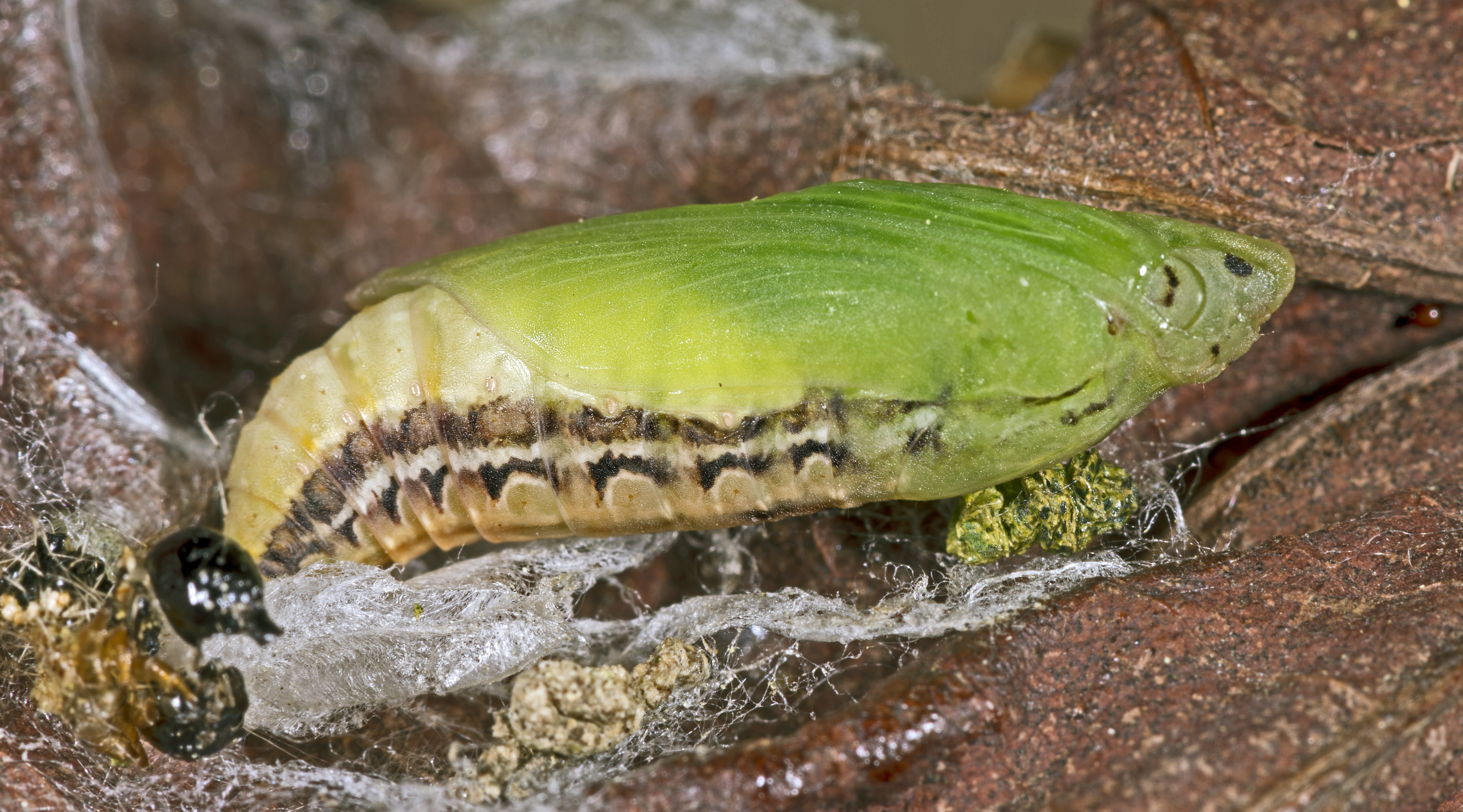
Pupa

Brown variant

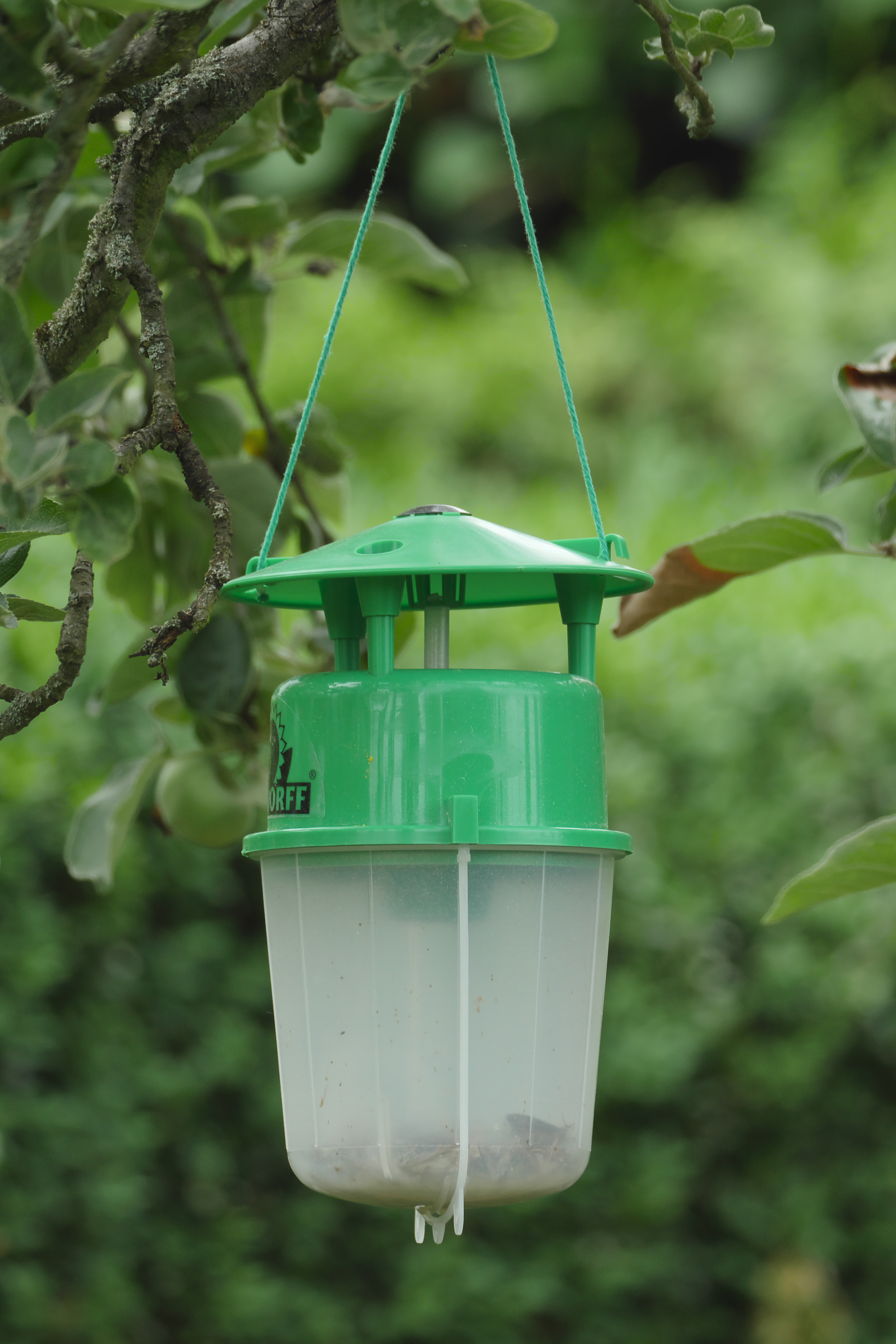
Pheromone trap. The pheromone is included in the small plastic tube below the cap, and directly below there is a funnel leading into the receiving container

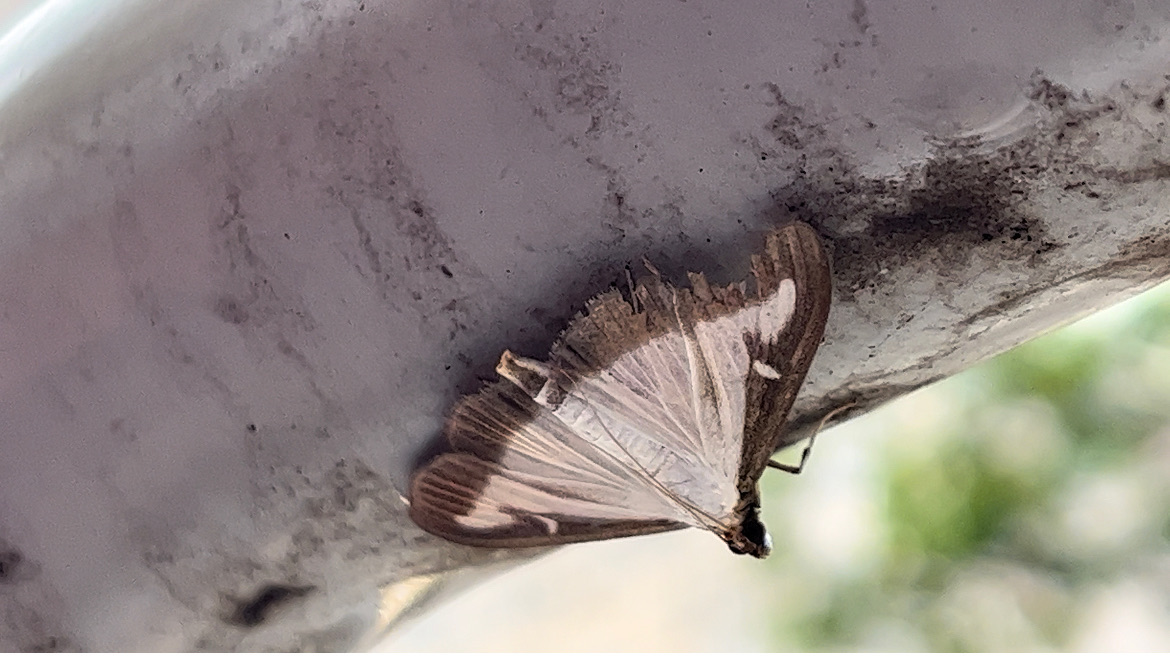
Specimen during rain

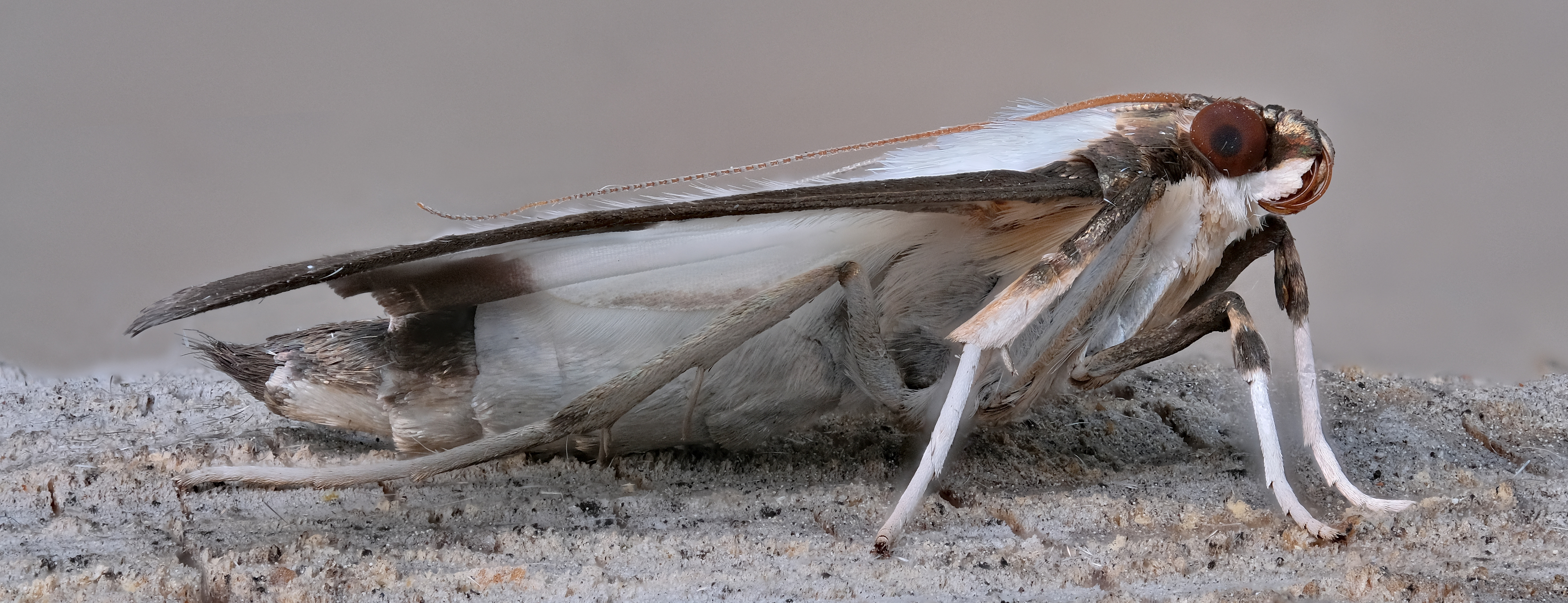
Lateral view
