= Crassicornia =

Scientific classification
- Kingdom: Animalia
- Phylum: Arthropoda
- Class: Insecta
- Order: Diptera
- Family: Tachinidae
- Subfamily: Exoristinae
- Tribe: Exoristini
- Genus: Crassicornia; Kugler, 1980

Type species
- Exorista pilosa Kugler, 1980

Genus of flies

Crassicornia is a genus of flies in the family Tachinidae.

== Species ==
- Crassicornia pilosa (Kugler, 1980)
