= Exorista sorbillans =

Scientific classification
- Kingdom: Animalia
- Phylum: Arthropoda
- Class: Insecta
- Order: Diptera
- Family: Tachinidae
- Subfamily: Exoristinae
- Tribe: Exoristini
- Genus: Exorista
- Species: E. sorbillans

Binomial name
- Exorista sorbillans (Wiedemann, 1830)

Synonyms
- Tachina sorbillans Wiedemann, 1830; Oestrus bombycis Louis, 1880

Species of fly

Exorista sorbillans, the uzi fly, is a species of bristly fly in the family Tachinidae that is a parasitoid of caterpillars and is a problem for silkworm rearing in tropical regions of South and Southeast Asia.

The species found in India, Exorista bombycis is sometimes synonymised with this species, but is distinct from specimens obtained from the type locality, the Canary Islands.

== Distribution ==
Tajikistan, Hungary, Romania, Ukraine, Bulgaria, Greece, Italy, Serbia, Spain, Turkey, Austria, France, Japan, South Korea, Iran, Israel, Mongolia, Canary Islands, Egypt, Russia, Cameroon, Congo, Kenya, Malawi, Nigeria, Sierra Leone, Uganda, China, India, Japan, Taiwan, Australia, Lord Howe Island, Papua New Guinea.
