= Phorcidella =

Scientific classification
- Kingdom: Animalia
- Phylum: Arthropoda
- Class: Insecta
- Order: Diptera
- Family: Tachinidae
- Subfamily: Exoristinae
- Tribe: Exoristini
- Genus: Phorcidella; Mesnil, 1947

Type species
- Eutachina basalis Baranov, 1932

Genus of flies

Phorcidella is a genus of flies in the family Tachinidae.

== Species ==
- Phorcidella basalis (Baranov, 1932)

== Distribution ==
China, Taiwan.
