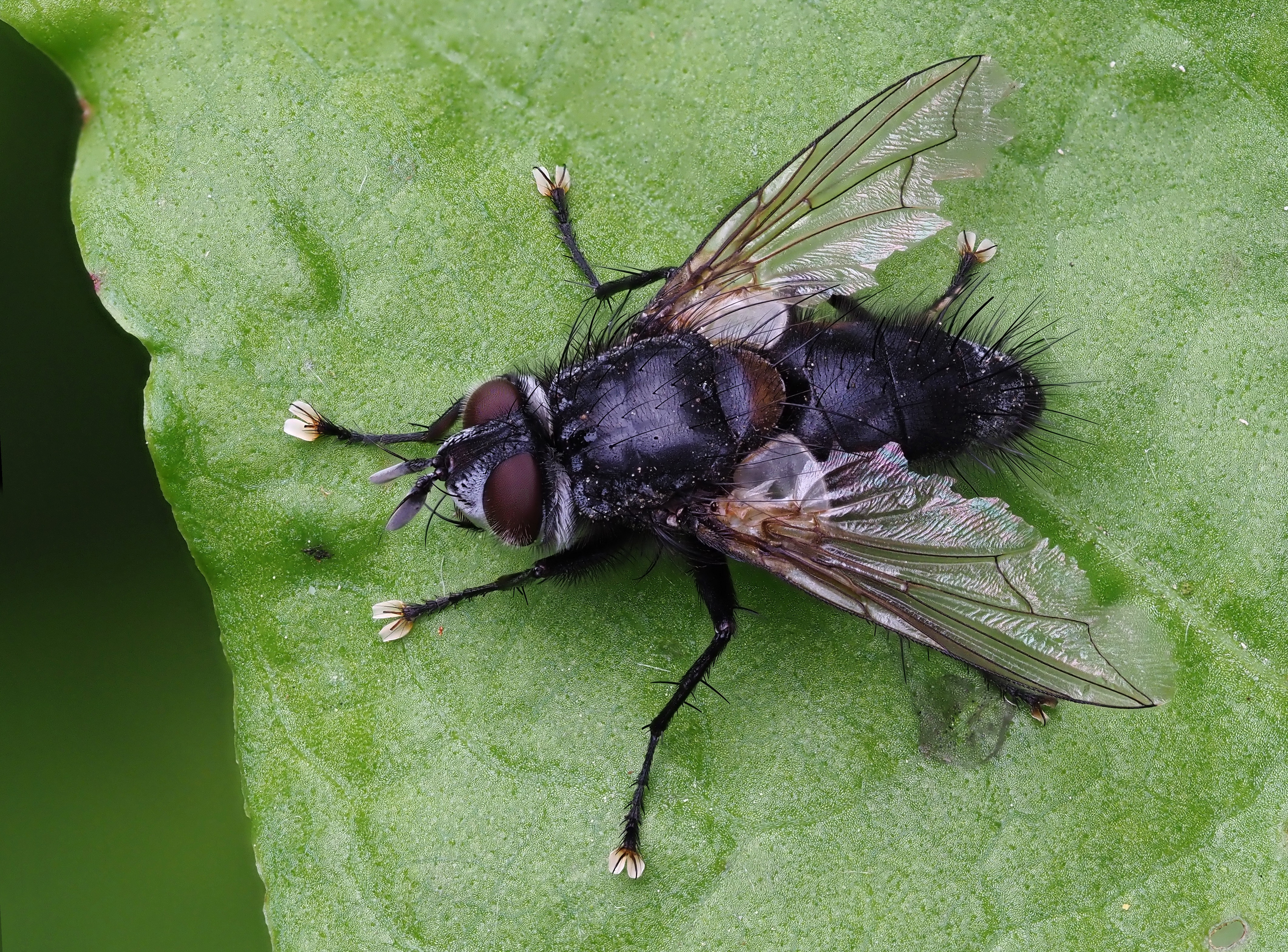
- Phorocera assimilis

Scientific classification
- Kingdom: Animalia
- Phylum: Arthropoda
- Class: Insecta
- Order: Diptera
- Family: Tachinidae
- Subfamily: Exoristinae
- Tribe: Exoristini
- Genus: Phorocera; Robineau-Desvoidy, 1830

Type species
- Phorocera agilis Robineau-Desvoidy, 1830

Synonyms
- Leptochaeta Brauer & von Berganstamm, 1889; Phirocera Segvelt, 1881; Setigena Brauer & von Berganstamm, 1889

= Phorocera =

Genus of flies

Phorocera is a genus of flies in the family Tachinidae.

== Species ==
- Phorocera aequalis (Reinhard, 1935)
- Phorocera angustiforceps Wood, 1972
- Phorocera assimilis (Fallén, 1810)
- Phorocera atricans Tschorsnig, 1992
- Phorocera auriceps Wood, 1972
- Phorocera compascua (Reinhard, 1935)
- Phorocera convexa Wood, 1972
- Phorocera exigua Wood, 1972
- Phorocera grandis (Rondani, 1859)
- Phorocera hyalipennis Macquart, 1855
- Phorocera obscura (Fallén, 1810)
- Phorocera slossonae (Townsend, 1908)
- Phorocera webberi (Smith, 1917)
