= Hillomyia =

Scientific classification
- Kingdom: Animalia
- Phylum: Arthropoda
- Clade: Pancrustacea
- Class: Insecta
- Order: Diptera
- Family: Tachinidae
- Subfamily: Exoristinae
- Tribe: Exoristini
- Genus: Hillomyia; Crosskey, 1973

Type species
- Hillia polita Malloch, 1929

Synonyms
- Hillia Malloch, 1929

Genus of flies

Hillomyia is a genus of flies in the family Tachinidae.

== Species ==
- Hillomyia polita (Malloch, 1929)

== Distribution ==
Australia.
