= Austrophorocera =

Scientific classification
- Kingdom: Animalia
- Phylum: Arthropoda
- Class: Insecta
- Order: Diptera
- Family: Tachinidae
- Subfamily: Exoristinae
- Tribe: Exoristini
- Genus: Austrophorocera; Townsend, 1916

Type species
- Phorocera biserialis Macquart, 1847

Synonyms
- Euphoroceropsis Townsend, 1917; Palpexorista Townsend, 1926

Genus of flies

Austrophorocera is a genus of flies in the family Tachinidae.

== Species ==
- Austrophorocera aequalis (Malloch, 1935)
- Austrophorocera alba (Townsend, 1917)
- Austrophorocera bancrofti (Crosskey, 1967)
- Austrophorocera biserialis (Macquart, 1847)
- Austrophorocera cocciphila (Aldrich & Webber, 1924)
- Austrophorocera coccyx (Aldrich & Webber, 1924)
- Austrophorocera decedens (Walker, 1860)
- Austrophorocera disparis (Sabrosky, 1976)
- Austrophorocera einaris (Smith, 1912)
- Austrophorocera fasciata (Townsend, 1928)
- Austrophorocera gilpiniae (Mesnil, 1971)
- Austrophorocera grandis (Macquart, 1851)
- Austrophorocera heros (Schiner, 1868)
- Austrophorocera hirsuta (Mesnil, 1947)
- Austrophorocera imitator (Aldrich & Webber, 1924)
- Austrophorocera immersa (Walker, 1859)
- Austrophorocera isabeli (Baranov, 1938)
- Austrophorocera laetifica (Mesnil, 1950)
- Austrophorocera longiuscula (Walker, 1858)
- Austrophorocera lucagus (Walker, 1849)
- Austrophorocera meridionalis (Thompson, 1968)
- Austrophorocera minor (Thompson, 1968)
- Austrophorocera munda (Wiedemann, 1830)
- Austrophorocera ophirica (Walker, 1856)
- Austrophorocera painei (Baranov, 1934)
- Austrophorocera pellecta (Reinhard, 1957)
- Austrophorocera reclinata (Crosskey, 1967)
- Austrophorocera rusti (Aldrich, 1929)
- Austrophorocera solennis (Walker, 1858)
- Austrophorocera sorocula (Mesnil, 1949)
- Austrophorocera stolida (Reinhard, 1957)
- Austrophorocera subanajama (Townsend, 1927)
- Austrophorocera sulcata (Aldrich & Webber, 1924)
- Austrophorocera summaria (Townsend, 1927)
- Austrophorocera tuxedo (Curran, 1930)
- Austrophorocera upoluae (Malloch, 1935)
- Austrophorocera virilis (Aldrich & Webber, 1924)
