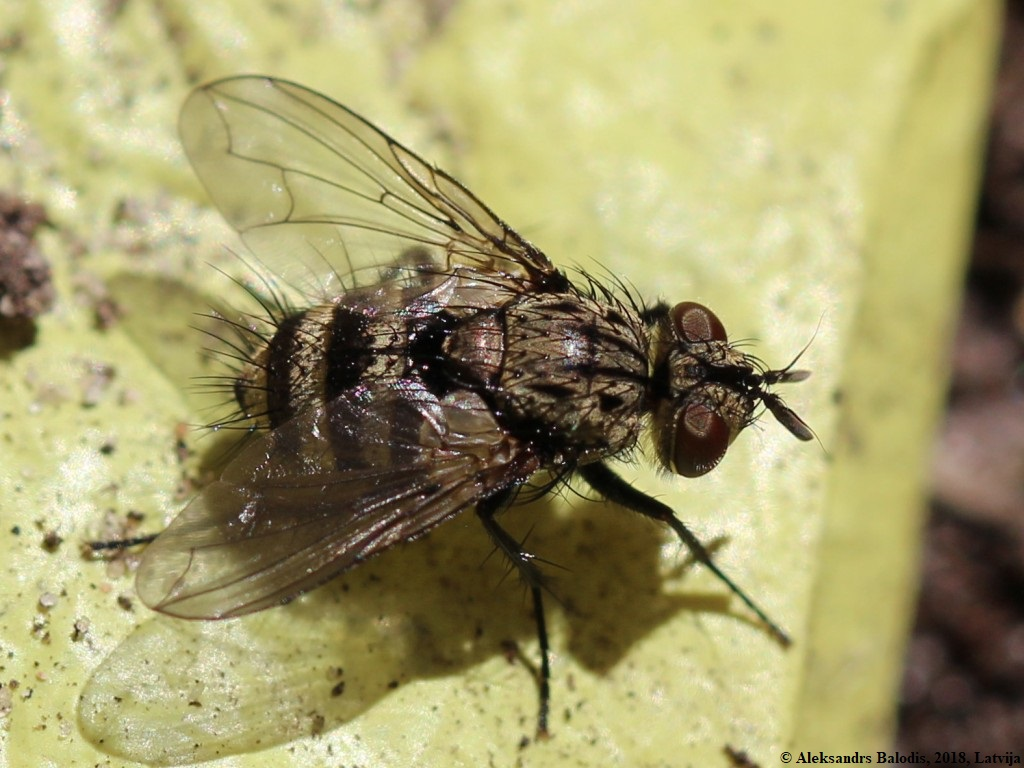
- Chetogena tschorsnigi

Scientific classification
- Kingdom: Animalia
- Phylum: Arthropoda
- Clade: Pancrustacea
- Class: Insecta
- Order: Diptera
- Family: Tachinidae
- Subfamily: Exoristinae
- Tribe: Exoristini
- Genus: Chetogena; Rondani, 1856

Type species
- Tachina gramma Meigen, 1824

Synonyms
- Ammobia Wulp, 1869; Chaetogena Scudder, 1882; Diplostichus Brauer & von Berganstamm, 1889; Eggeria Schiner, 1861; Epiplagiops Blanchard, 1943; Euphorocera Townsend, 1892; Lalage Robineau-Desvoidy, 1863; Murdockiana Townsend, 1916; Neophorocera Townsend, 1912; Plagiops Townsend, 1911; Plagiprospherysa Townsend, 1892; Salia Robineau-Desvoidy, 1830; Setigena Brauer, 1893; Spoggosia Rondani, 1859; Spongosia Brauer, 1893; Stomatomya Villeneuve, 1916; Stomatomyia Brauer & von Berganstamm, 1889; Stomatomyiopsis Belanovsky, 1953; Stomatotachina Townsend, 1931; Tachinoptera Brauer & von Berganstamm, 1891; Tachinosalia Villeneuve, 1923

= Chetogena =

Genus of flies

Chetogena is a genus of flies in the family Tachinidae.

== Species ==
- Chetogena acuminata Rondani, 1859
- Chetogena aegyptiaca (Villeneuve, 1923)
- Chetogena alpestris Tschorsnig, 1997
- Chetogena appendiculata (Wulp, 1890)
- Chetogena approximata (Villeneuve, 1936)
- Chetogena arnaudi (Reinhard, 1956)
- Chetogena barbara (Mesnil, 1939)
- Chetogena bezziana (Baranov, 1934)
- Chetogena biserialis (Schiner, 1868)
- Chetogena caridei (Brèthes, 1918)
- Chetogena cercosa Kugler, 1980
- Chetogena cinerea (Wulp, 1890)
- Chetogena claripennis (Macquart, 1848)
- Chetogena clunalis (Reinhard, 1956)
- Chetogena cumutoensis (Thompson, 1968)
- Chetogena echinata (Mesnil, 1939)
- Chetogena edwardsii (Williston, 1889)
- Chetogena eurotae (Blanchard, 1937)
- Chetogena fasciata (Egger, 1856)
- Chetogena filipalpis Rondani, 1859
- Chetogena filipes (Mesnil, 1939)
- Chetogena flaviceps (Bigot, 1887)
- Chetogena floridensis (Townsend, 1892)
- Chetogena gelida (Coquillett, 1897)
- Chetogena gynaephorae Chao & Shi, 1987
- Chetogena haywardi (Blanchard, 1947)
- Chetogena heliconunarum (Townsend, 1929)
- Chetogena hichinsi (Cortés, 1967)
- Chetogena indivisa (Aldrich & Webber, 1924)
- Chetogena innocens (Wiedemann, 1830)
- Chetogena janitrix (Hartig, 1838)
- Chetogena littoralis (Blanchard, 1943)
- Chetogena lophyri (Townsend, 1892)
- Chetogena mageritensis (Villeneuve, 1936)
- Chetogena media Rondani, 1859
- Chetogena meridionalis (Townsend, 1912)
- Chetogena micronychia (Masson, 1969)
- Chetogena micropalpis (Malloch, 1930)
- Chetogena minor (Townsend, 1912)
- Chetogena nigrofasciata (Strobl, 1902)
- Chetogena noera (Reinhard, 1957)
- Chetogena obliquata (Fallén, 1810)
- Chetogena omissa (Reinhard, 1934)
- Chetogena orientalis (Townsend, 1929)
- Chetogena palpella (Mesnil, 1963)
- Chetogena palteata (Wulp, 1890)
- Chetogena paradoxa (Brauer & von Berganstamm, 1893)
- Chetogena parvipalpis (Wulp, 1890)
- Chetogena platensis (Brèthes, 1922)
- Chetogena porteri (Brèthes, 1920)
- Chetogena puer (Williston, 1896)
- Chetogena raoi (Mesnil, 1968)
- Chetogena repanda (Mesnil, 1939)
- Chetogena rondaniana (Villeneuve, 1931)
- Chetogena sellersi (Hall, 1939)
- Chetogena setertia (Curran, 1940)
- Chetogena setosaria (Curran, 1940)
- Chetogena setosina (Curran, 1940)
- Chetogena siciliensis (Villeneuve, 1924)
- Chetogena sinaica (Villeneuve, 1909)
- Chetogena soror Mesnil, 1971
- Chetogena subnitens (Aldrich & Webber, 1924)
- Chetogena tachinomoides (Townsend, 1892)
- Chetogena tessellata (Brauer & von Berganstamm, 1891)
- Chetogena tricholygoides (Bezzi, 1928)
- Chetogena trinitatis (Thompson, 1968)
- Chetogena tschorsnigi Ziegler, 1999
- Chetogena tuomuerensis Chao & Shi, 1987
- Chetogena tuomurensis Chao, 1985
- Chetogena vibrissata (Brauer & von Berganstamm, 1891)
- Chetogena vivida (Wiedemann, 1830)
