= Gueriniopsis =

Scientific classification
- Kingdom: Animalia
- Phylum: Arthropoda
- Clade: Pancrustacea
- Class: Insecta
- Order: Diptera
- Family: Tachinidae
- Subfamily: Exoristinae
- Tribe: Exoristini
- Genus: Gueriniopsis; Reinhard, 1943

Type species
- Gueriniopsis plausilis Reinhard, 1943

Genus of flies

Gueriniopsis is a genus of flies in the family Tachinidae.

== Species ==
- Gueriniopsis setipes (Coquillett, 1902)

== Distribution ==
Canada, United States.
