= Bessa =

Scientific classification
- Kingdom: Animalia
- Phylum: Arthropoda
- Class: Insecta
- Order: Diptera
- Family: Tachinidae
- Subfamily: Exoristinae
- Tribe: Exoristini
- Genus: Bessa; Robineau-Desvoidy, 1863

Type species
- Bessa secutrix Robineau-Desvoidy, 1863

Synonyms
- Daeochaeta Townsend, 1892; Hubertia Robineau-Desvoidy, 1863; Lilaea Robineau-Desvoidy, 1863; Myrsina Robineau-Desvoidy, 1863; Osmina Robineau-Desvoidy, 1863; Prosopodes Brauer & von Berganstamm, 1889; Ptychomyia Brauer & von Berganstamm, 1889; Thalpia Robineau-Desvoidy, 1863

Genus of flies

Bessa is a genus of flies in the family Tachinidae.

== Species ==
- Bessa africana (Curran, 1941)
- Bessa harveyi (Townsend, 1892)
- Bessa parallela (Meigen, 1824)
- Bessa remota (Aldrich, 1925)
- Bessa selecta (Meigen, 1824)
