= Cydalima diaphanalis =

Scientific classification
- Kingdom: Animalia
- Phylum: Arthropoda
- Clade: Pancrustacea
- Class: Insecta
- Order: Lepidoptera
- Family: Crambidae
- Genus: Cydalima
- Species: C. diaphanalis

Binomial name
- Cydalima diaphanalis (Walker, 1866)

Synonyms
- Margaronia diaphanalis Walker, 1866; Botys fuscinervalis Snellen, 1895; Botys margaronialis Walker, 1866; Margaronia plumifera Butler, 1882

Species of moth

Cydalima diaphanalis is a moth in the family Crambidae. It was described by Francis Walker in 1866. It is found in Burma, Indonesia (Java, Sumatra, Kepulauan Aru, Papua New Guinea), on the Solomon Islands and in Thailand and Australia, where it has been recorded from Queensland and South Australia.

The wings are white with a small black dot near the middle. The forewings have a brown costa and there are black dots on the margin near the wingtip.
