= Cydalima decipiens =

Scientific classification
- Kingdom: Animalia
- Phylum: Arthropoda
- Class: Insecta
- Order: Lepidoptera
- Family: Crambidae
- Genus: Cydalima
- Species: C. decipiens

Binomial name
- Cydalima decipiens (Hampson, 1912)

Synonyms
- Glyphodes decipiens Hampson, 1912

Species of moth

Cydalima decipiens is a moth in the family Crambidae. It was described by George Hampson in 1912. It is found on Seram in Indonesia.
