= Chaetexorista =

Scientific classification
- Kingdom: Animalia
- Phylum: Arthropoda
- Class: Insecta
- Order: Diptera
- Family: Tachinidae
- Subfamily: Exoristinae
- Tribe: Exoristini
- Genus: Chaetexorista; Brauer & von Berganstamm, 1894

Type species
- Chaetexorista javana Brauer & von Berganstamm, 1894

Synonyms
- Hygia Mesnil, 1952; Isoprosopaea Townsend, 1941; Megacarcelia Stackelberg, 1943; Megacarcellia Neave, 1950; Parapodomyia Mesnil, 1956

Genus of flies

Chaetexorista is a genus of flies in the family Tachinidae.

== Species ==
- Chaetexorista atripalpis Shima, 1973
- Chaetexorista claripennis (Mesnil, 1952)
- Chaetexorista discalis Shima, 1973
- Chaetexorista dives (Villeneuve, 1938)
- Chaetexorista eutachinoides (Baranov, 1932)
- Chaetexorista imperator (Baranov, 1936)
- Chaetexorista javana Brauer & von Berganstamm, 1894
- Chaetexorista klapperichi Mesnil, 1960
- Chaetexorista langi (Curran, 1927)
- Chaetexorista microchaeta Chao, 1965
- Chaetexorista ocellaris (Curran, 1927)
- Chaetexorista palpis Chao, 1965
- Chaetexorista setosa Chao, 1965
- Chaetexorista solomonensis Baranov, 1936
- Chaetexorista sororcula (Villeneuve, 1938)
