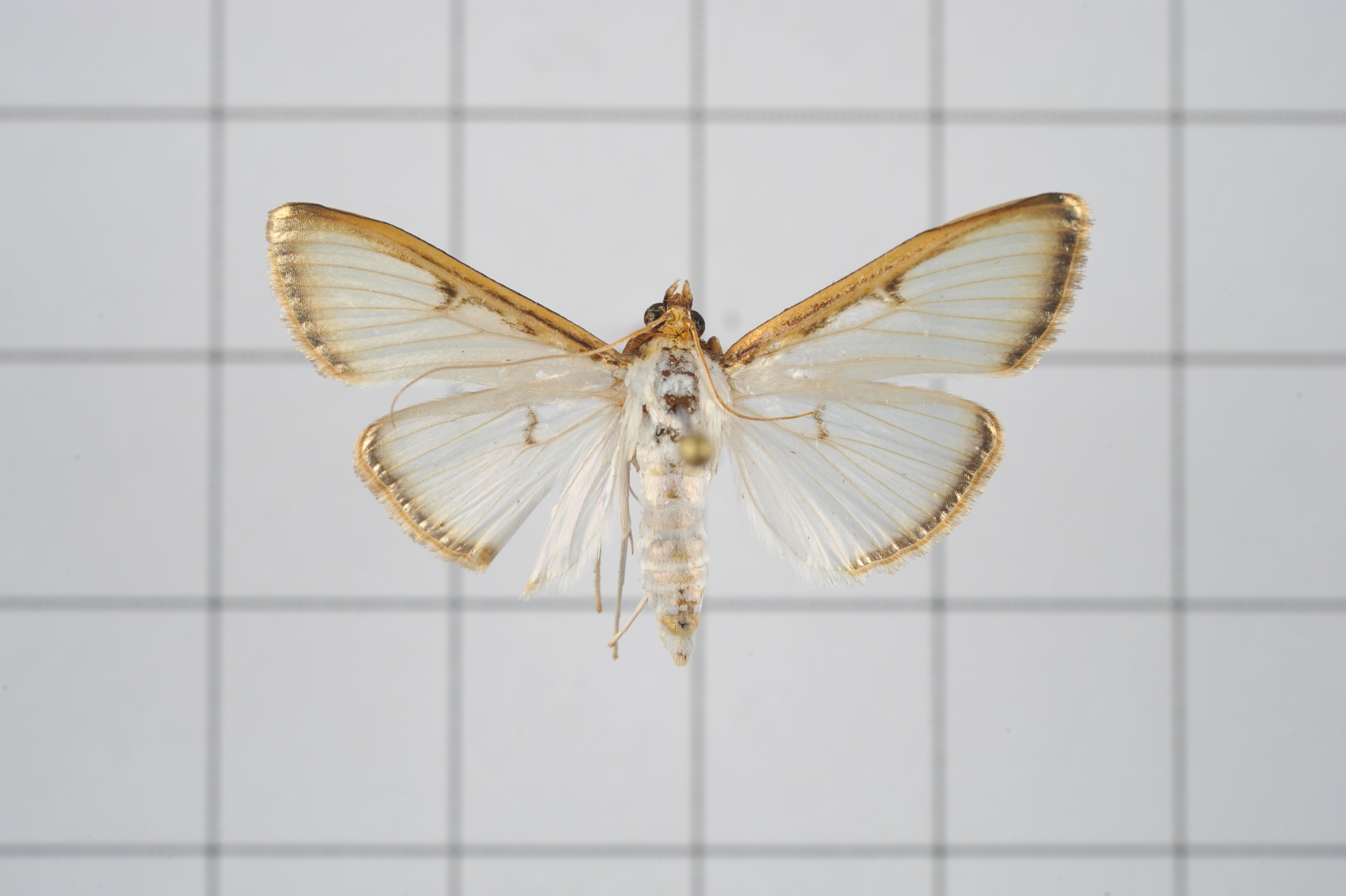

Scientific classification
- Kingdom: Animalia
- Phylum: Arthropoda
- Class: Insecta
- Order: Lepidoptera
- Family: Crambidae
- Genus: Cydalima
- Species: C. pfeifferae

Binomial name
- Cydalima pfeifferae (Lederer, 1863)

Synonyms
- Sisyrophora pfeifferae Lederer, 1863; Cydalima elwesialis Snellen, 1890

= Cydalima pfeifferae =

Species of moth

Cydalima pfeifferae is a moth in the family Crambidae. It was described by Julius Lederer in 1863. It is found in India (Sikkim, the Andamans), Myanmar, Singapore, Indonesia (Sumatra, Borneo), Taiwan and Australia, where it has been recorded on Queensland.

The wings are white with a brown line around the edges and a brown dot near the middle.
