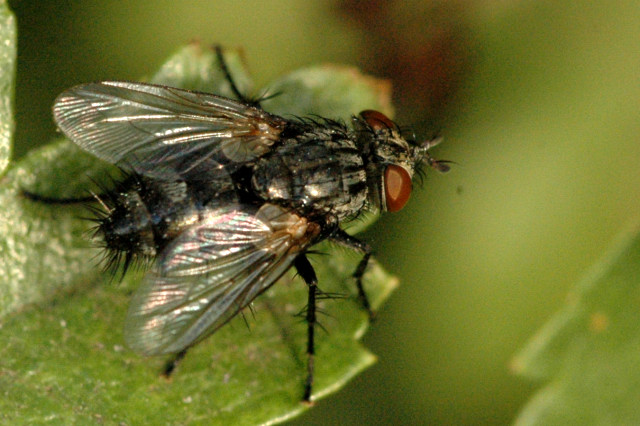
- Exorista larvarum

Scientific classification
- Kingdom: Animalia
- Phylum: Arthropoda
- Clade: Pancrustacea
- Class: Insecta
- Order: Diptera
- Family: Tachinidae
- Subfamily: Exoristinae
- Tribe: Exoristini
- Genus: Exorista
- Species: E. larvarum

Binomial name
- Exorista larvarum (Linnaeus, 1758)

Synonyms
- Tachina nakanensis Matsumura, 1916; Eriothrix gentilis Meigen, 1805; Exorista jugoslavica Lehrer & Dobrivojevic, 1967; Masicera pulverulenta Macquart, 1851; Musca larvarum Linnaeus, 1758; Musca larvincola Ratzeburg, 1844; Musca monachae Ratzeburg, 1844; Tachina chrysalidarum Rondani, 1859; Tachina flavescens Meigen, 1824; Tachina grandis Robineau-Desvoidy, 1863; Tachina insuscepta Walker, 1853; Tachina laeta Robineau-Desvoidy, 1863; Tachina littoralis Robineau-Desvoidy, 1830; Tachina macroglossae Robineau-Desvoidy, 1850; Tachina melanocolica Robineau-Desvoidy, 1863; Tachina moreti Robineau-Desvoidy, 1853; Tachina nitidiventris Macquart, 1854; Tachina nobilis Robineau-Desvoidy, 1863; Tachina noctuarum Rondani, 1865; Tachina praepotens Meigen, 1824; Tachina puella Robineau-Desvoidy, 1863; Tachina rapida Robineau-Desvoidy, 1830; Tachina rubescens Robineau-Desvoidy, 1830; Tachina scutellaris Robineau-Desvoidy, 1830; Tachina stimulans Meigen, 1824; Tachina tardata Robineau-Desvoidy, 1863; Tachina utilis Townsend, 1908; Tachina vagans Robineau-Desvoidy, 1830; Tachina vidua Meigen, 1824; Tachina villica Robineau-Desvoidy, 1830

= Exorista larvarum =

Species of fly

Exorista larvarum is a Palaearctic species of fly in the family Tachinidae.

== Distribution ==
Canada, United States, Tajikistan, Turkmenistan, British Isles, Belarus, Czech Republic, Hungary, Latvia, Lithuania, Moldova, Poland, Romania, Slovakia, Ukraine, Denmark, Finland, Sweden, Bulgaria, Corsica, Croatia, Greece, Italy, Macedonia, Portugal, Serbia, Slovenia, Spain, Turkey, Yugoslavia, Austria, Belgium, France, Germany, Netherlands, Switzerland, Japan, North Korea, Iran, Israel, Palestine, Saudi Arabia, Mongolia, Egypt, Tunisia, Russia, Armenia, Azerbaijan, Georgia, China, India, Taiwan.

== Hosts ==
Lepidoptera larvae, mainly Lymantriidae and Lasiocampidae. It attacks Lymantria dispar dispar. Studies have been conducted into its ability to successfully prey on Mythimna unipuncta and Cydalima perspectalis.

== Parasitic nature ==
It lays an egg on its host. The egg hatches and the larva penetrates the host. The host could escape this fate by molting before the egg hatches.

== Artificial Diets ==
For rearing Exorista larvarum in controlled conditions, inexpensive diets are preferable. MEYS contains liquid skimmed milk, chicken egg yolk, yeast extract and saccharose and HEYS contains veal homogenate, chicken egg yolk, yeast extract and saccharose. Though many variations of the diet yield different results. Larvae have a tendency to wander, which can result in starvation, so reducing wander is important for maximizing yields.
