= Cydalima capriniodes =

Scientific classification
- Kingdom: Animalia
- Phylum: Arthropoda
- Class: Insecta
- Order: Lepidoptera
- Family: Crambidae
- Genus: Cydalima
- Species: C. capriniodes

Binomial name
- Cydalima capriniodes (Hampson, 1912)

Synonyms
- Glyphodes capriniodes Hampson, 1912

Species of moth

Cydalima capriniodes is a moth in the family Crambidae. It was described by George Hampson in 1912. It is found in India (Punjab, Maharashtra, the Andamans) and Myanmar.
