= Parasetigena =

Scientific classification
- Kingdom: Animalia
- Phylum: Arthropoda
- Class: Insecta
- Order: Diptera
- Family: Tachinidae
- Subfamily: Exoristinae
- Tribe: Exoristini
- Genus: Parasetigena; Brauer & von Berganstamm, 1891

Synonyms
- Duponchelia Robineau-Desvoidy, 1863; Parastegia Anonymous, 1971

Genus of flies

Parasetigena is a genus of flies in the family Tachinidae.

== Species ==
- Parasetigena silvestris (Robineau-Desvoidy, 1863)
- Parasetigena takaoi (Mesnil, 1960)
