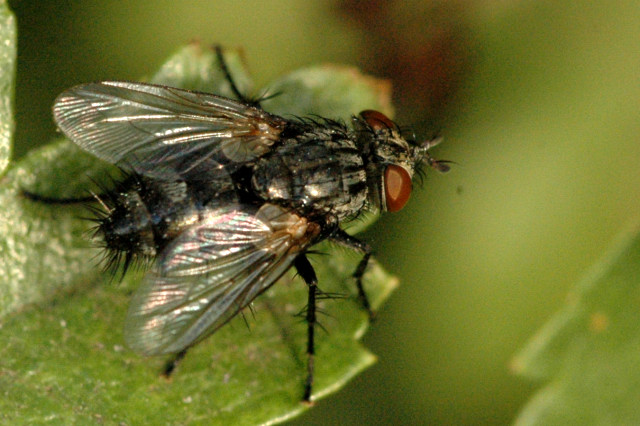
- Exorista larvarum

Scientific classification
- Kingdom: Animalia
- Phylum: Arthropoda
- Clade: Pancrustacea
- Class: Insecta
- Order: Diptera
- Family: Tachinidae
- Subfamily: Exoristinae
- Tribe: Exoristini
- Genus: Exorista; Meigen, 1803

Type species
- Musca larvarum Linnaeus, 1758

Synonyms
- Acromera Lioy, 1864; Biomyopsis Townsend, 1927; Campemyia Latreille, 1830; Cyclotaphrys Townsend, 1909; Microtachina Mik, 1892; Podotachina Brauer & von Berganstamm, 1891; Pokornya Strobl, 1893; Scotiella Mesnil, 1940; Thricholyga Rondani, 1859; Thricolyga Neave, 1940; Thrycoliga Lioy, 1864; Thrycolyga Rondani, 1856; Tricholyga Rondani, 1865

= Exorista =

Genus of flies

Exorista is a genus of flies in the family Tachinidae.

== Subgenera & species ==
- Subgenus Adenia Robineau-Desvoidy, 1863

- Exorista cuneata Herting, 1971
- Exorista dydas (Walker, 1849)
- Exorista fucosa Mesnil, 1963
- Exorista lacteipennis Mesnil, 1970
- Exorista mimula (Meigen, 1824)
- Exorista nympharum (Rondani, 1859)
- Exorista paligera Mesnil, 1970
- Exorista pseudorustica Chao, 1964
- Exorista rustica (Fallén, 1810)
- Exorista tamias Richter, 1974
- Exorista trudis (Reinhard, 1951)
- Exorista tubulosa Herting, 1967

- Subgenus Exorista Meigen, 1803

- Exorista amoena Mesnil, 1960
- Exorista brevihirta Liang & Chao, 1992
- Exorista fasciata (Fallén, 1820)
- Exorista frons Chao, 1964
- Exorista frontata Herting, 1973
- Exorista intermedia Chao & Liang, 1992
- Exorista japonica (Townsend, 1909)
- Exorista larvarum (Linnaeus, 1758)
- Exorista laterosetosa Chao, 1964
- Exorista mella (Walker, 1849)
- Exorista rossica Mesnil, 1960
- Exorista segregata (Rondani, 1859)
- Exorista thomasi Mesnil, 1960
- Exorista thula Wood, 2002

- Subgenus Exoristella Herting, 1984

- Exorista duplaria (Villeneuve, 1916)
- Exorista glossatorum (Rondani, 1859)

- Subgenus Fauniodes Mesnil, 1941

- Exorista securicornis Mesnil, 1941

- Subgenus Podotachina Brauer & von Bergenstamm, 1891

- Exorista atricans (Villeneuve, 1938)
- Exorista cantans Mesnil, 1960
- Exorista flavicans Mesnil, 1941
- Exorista fuscihirta Chao & Liang, 1992
- Exorista grandis (Zetterstedt, 1844)
- Exorista hainanensis Chao & Liang, 1992
- Exorista ladelli (Baranov, 1936)
- Exorista longicercus Kugler, 1980
- Exorista rubricans Mesnil, 1941
- Exorista sericans Mesnil, 1939
- Exorista sorbillans (Wiedemann, 1830)
- Exorista tenuicerca Liang & Chao, 1992
- Exorista tessellans Mesnil, 1939
- Exorista yunnanica Chao, 1964

- Subgenus Ptilotachina Brauer & von Bergenstamm, 1891

- Exorista belanovskii Richter, 1970
- Exorista cardinalis Mesnil, 1939
- Exorista civilis (Rondani, 1859)
- Exorista decidua (Pandellé, 1896)
- Exorista deligata Pandellé, 1896
- Exorista dilecta Richter, 1973
- Exorista ebneri (Villeneuve, 1922)
- Exorista elegantula Mesnil, 1939
- Exorista florentina Herting, 1975
- Exorista kulgeri Mesnil, 1960
- Exorista longisquama Liang & Chao, 1992
- Exorista neta (Curran, 1927)
- Exorista niveipennis Mesnil, 1939
- Exorista rutilans Mesnil, 1970
- Exorista tristis (Curran, 1938)
- Exorista unicolor (Stein, 1924)
- Exorista wangi Chao & Liang, 1992
- Exorista xanthaspis (Wiedemann, 1830)

- Subgenus Spixomyia Crosskey, 1967

- Exorista antennalis Chao, 1964
- Exorista aurichalcea (Baranov, 1936)
- Exorista bisetosa Mesnil, 1940
- Exorista dasyops (Villeneuve, 1943)
- Exorista fortis Chao, 1964
- Exorista fuscipennis (Baranov, 1932)
- Exorista grandiforceps Chao, 1964
- Exorista hyalipennis (Baranov, 1932)
- Exorista lepis Chao, 1964
- Exorista patelliforceps Mesnil, 1963
- Exorista penicilla Chao & Liang, 1992
- Exorista quadriseta (Baranov, 1932)
- Exorista rusticoides Mesnil, 1963
- Exorista spina Chao & Liang, 1992

- Subgenus Tricoliga (Rondani, 1856)

- Exorista buccalis Mesnil, 1940
- Exorista nova (Rondani, 1856)

- Unplaced to subgenus

- Exorista abdominalis (Curran, 1927)
- Exorista africana (Rohdendorf, 1931)
- Exorista argenteostriata (Baranov, 1938)
- Exorista aureifrons (Baranov, 1936)
- Exorista aureisquamosa (Baranov, 1938)
- Exorista capensis (Macquart, 1855)
- Exorista castanea (Wulp, 1894)
- Exorista cephalopalpis Chao, 1964
- Exorista coras (Walker, 1849)
- Exorista creole (Curran, 1927)
- Exorista curriei (Curran, 1938)
- Exorista doddi (Curran, 1938)
- Exorista flaviceps Macquart, 1847
- Exorista flaviventris Tachi, 2011
- Exorista ghanii Mesnil, 1971
- Exorista globosa Tachi, 2011
- Exorista horrens (Walker, 1859)
- Exorista javana (Macquart, 1851)
- Exorista manifesta (Walker, 1860)
- Exorista modesta Meigen, 1838
- Exorista norrisi Cantrell, 1985
- Exorista notabilis (Walker, 1858)
- Exorista pilosa Kugler, 1980
- Exorista psamathe (Walker, 1849)
- Exorista psychidivora (Coquillett, 1904)
- Exorista rendina Herting, 1975
- Exorista rusticella (Baranov, 1936)
- Exorista sabahensis Tachi, 2011
- Exorista salmantica Tschorsnig, 1984
- Exorista sarcophagata (Walker, 1864)
- Exorista sessitans (Curran, 1927)
- Exorista sinica Chao, 1964
- Exorista subnigra (Wulp, 1894)
- Exorista sumatrensis (Townsend, 1927)
- Exorista tubigera Mesnil, 1970
- Exorista velutina Mesnil, 1953
