= Cydalima mysteris =

Scientific classification
- Kingdom: Animalia
- Phylum: Arthropoda
- Class: Insecta
- Order: Lepidoptera
- Family: Crambidae
- Genus: Cydalima
- Species: C. mysteris

Binomial name
- Cydalima mysteris Meyrick, 1886

Species of moth

Cydalima mysteris is a moth in the family Crambidae. It was described by Edward Meyrick in 1886. It is found on Vanuatu.
