= Ctenophorinia =

Scientific classification
- Kingdom: Animalia
- Phylum: Arthropoda
- Class: Insecta
- Order: Diptera
- Family: Tachinidae
- Subfamily: Exoristinae
- Tribe: Exoristini
- Genus: Ctenophorinia; Mesnil, 1963

Type species
- Ctenophorinia adiscalis Mesnil, 1963

Genus of flies

Ctenophorinia is a genus of flies in the family Tachinidae.

== Species ==
- Ctenophorinia adiscalis Mesnil, 1963
- Ctenophorinia christianae Ziegler & Shima, 1996
- Ctenophorinia frontalis Ziegler & Shima, 1996
- Ctenophorinia grisea Mesnil, 1967
