= Alloprosopaea =

Scientific classification
- Kingdom: Animalia
- Phylum: Arthropoda
- Class: Insecta
- Order: Diptera
- Family: Tachinidae
- Subfamily: Exoristinae
- Tribe: Exoristini
- Genus: Alloprosopaea; Villeneuve, 1923

Type species
- Alloprosopaea efflatouni Villeneuve, 1923

Genus of flies

Alloprosopaea is a genus of flies in the family Tachinidae.

== Species ==
- Alloprosopaea algerica Mesnil, 1961
- Alloprosopaea efflatouni Villeneuve, 1923
