= Neophryxe =

Scientific classification
- Kingdom: Animalia
- Phylum: Arthropoda
- Clade: Pancrustacea
- Class: Insecta
- Order: Diptera
- Family: Tachinidae
- Subfamily: Exoristinae
- Tribe: Exoristini
- Genus: Neophryxe; Townsend, 1916

Type species
- Neophryxe psychidis Townsend, 1916

Synonyms
- Prosalia Mesnil, 1946; Prosalia Mesnil, 1960; Prosalia Herting, 1984

Genus of flies

Neophryxe is a genus of flies in the family Tachinidae.

== Species ==
- Neophryxe australe Cerretti, 2012
- Neophryxe exserticercus Liang & Chao, 1992
- Neophryxe namibica Cerretti, 2012
- Neophryxe psychidis Townsend, 1916
- Neophryxe vallina (Rondani, 1861)
