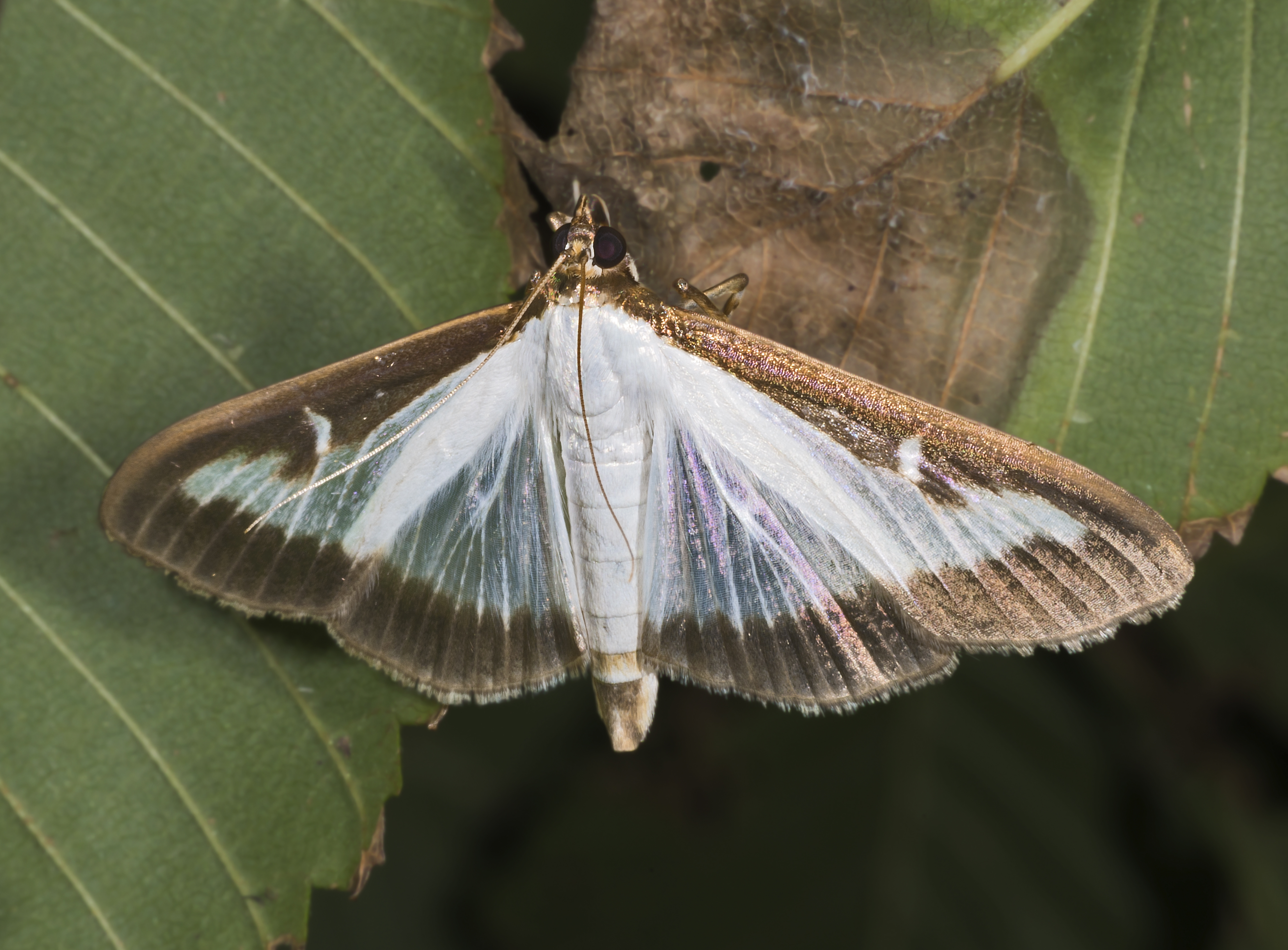
- Cydalima perspectalis

Scientific classification
- Kingdom: Animalia
- Phylum: Arthropoda
- Clade: Pancrustacea
- Class: Insecta
- Order: Lepidoptera
- Family: Crambidae
- Tribe: Margaroniini
- Genus: Cydalima; Lederer, 1863

Synonyms
- Neoglyphodes Streltzov, 2008; Sisyrophora Lederer, 1863; Uliocome Swinhoe, 1900

= Cydalima =

Genus of moths

Cydalima is a genus of moths of the Crambidae: Spilomelinae subfamily.

== Species ==
- Cydalima capriniodes (Hampson, 1912)
- Cydalima decipiens (Hampson, 1912)
- Cydalima diaphanalis (Walker, 1866)
- Cydalima joiceyi (Janse, 1924)
- Cydalima laticostalis (Guenée, 1854)
- Cydalima mysteris Meyrick, 1886
- Cydalima perspectalis (Walker, 1859) – box tree moth
- Cydalima pfeifferae (Lederer, 1863)
- Cydalima violalis E. Hering, 1901
