= Phorocera webberi =

Scientific classification
- Kingdom: Animalia
- Phylum: Arthropoda
- Clade: Pancrustacea
- Class: Insecta
- Order: Diptera
- Family: Tachinidae
- Genus: Phorocera
- Species: P. webberi

Binomial name
- Phorocera webberi (Smith, 1917)

Synonyms
- Pseudotachinomyia webberi Smith, 1917

Species of fly

Phorocera webberi is a species of bristle fly in the family Tachinidae. It is found in North America.
