= Mahasena corbetti =

Coconut case caterpillar

Scientific classification
- Kingdom: Animalia
- Phylum: Arthropoda
- Class: Insecta
- Order: Lepidoptera
- Family: Psychidae
- Genus: Mahasena
- Species: M. corbetti

Binomial name
- Mahasena corbetti Tams, 1928

Species of bagworm

Mahasena corbetti, the coconut case caterpillar, is a polyphagous species of bagworm. This species is classified as leaf-eating pest caterpillars that produce tough silk out of their bags from dried foliage. Currently, M. corbetti is considered a 'pest of quarantine importance' in multiple countries and is included on the list of dangerous pests in the Malaysian plant quarantine act.

== Distribution ==
Although initially native to Malaysia, this destructive leaf defoliating pest has now been recorded in many Southeast Asian regions and Pacific islands, including Thailand, Peninsular Malaysia, Sumatra, Java, Borneo (Brunei, Sabah), Solomon Islands, Samoa, Papua New Guinea and the Philippines. As of 2015-2016, it was identified for the first time in a region bordering India and Bangladesh as a pest of areca nut (Areca catechu L.) plants. Because the larvae of M. corbetti are most active as pests during bright sunlight, this species thrives in areas that get a lot of natural sunlight and heat.

== Morphology ==
Male M. corbetti larvae (without the case) are approximately 15-20 mm long. They have a brown thorax and head with a light yellowish brown abdomen. Their cases (or bags) are considerably smaller than that of their female counterparts. Gender determination of the bagworm is difficult in the larval stage, but size distinction in the pupal case lets us approximately determine the sex of the pest before it reaches the adult stage, since females generally have larger cases than males. In the pupal stage, the male pupa are approximately 12-15 mm in length and 3-4 mm in diameter while the female pupa are approximately 20-25 mm in length and 10-12 mm in diameter. This pupa is messy looking in appearance and is made from randomly shaped leaf pieces, stalks and other natural materials. During the pupae stage, male M. corbetti undergo metamorphosis and turn into moths. These male moths are generally varying degrees of black to brown with white scales on some. They have thinly scaled and often transparent wings and prominently pectinate antennae. Adult females - who spend the entirety of their lives in the pupa - are apterous, cylindrical, and creamy-white with either no or greatly minimized appendages. Both males and females lack mouthparts. The male pupa being a moth with eyes, antenna, and wings (wingspan of about 22-26 mm) marks sexual dimorphism in M. corbetti.

Anatomically, only adult male individuals of the M. corbetti species can be taxonomically identified. However, in this species, there are much fewer males than females and a male takes about 4-5 months to emerge after fertilization, which is why the DNA barcode is more commonly used for taxonomic identification. This DNA barcode was determined by sequencing a standard barcoding region of the mitochondrial oxidase I (COI) gene.

== Life cycle ==
The entire life cycle of M. corbetti is 110-140 days with a stage by stage breakup as follows:

- Egg:10 to 16 days
- Larva: 60 to 95 days
- Pupa: 14 to 26 days
- Adult: 7 to 10 days (male)

Neonatal larvae have well-developed sclerotized head and thoracic legs as well as weak abdominal forelegs. After emergence from the egg, they partake in an initial dispersal event. This dispersal event has been recorded but not well understood for this species. All that is known is that M. corbetti larvae are dispersed by wind, vehicles, animals, or humans.

The first thing the larvae do once they land on their host is construct their case from nearby foliage. This case is integral to their survival, as it is seen that if larvae are removed from the case, they usually do not construct a new case and will end up dying. This case provides protection, anchorage, and a microclimate environment integral to their survival. If attacked by predators, this case can be lengthened into a sleeve that provides absolute protection for the larvae. The larvae then attach to their host via a strong silk thread, walk around their host, and begin to scrape the surface of the leaves of their host. Whenever the larvae of M. corbetti are resting, feeding, or mounting, they will ensure that the case is anchored to the leaf via a tough silk thread to prevent falls/contact with the ground.

When ready to undergo pupation, the larva attach their case using strong silk thread to the vegetation they were feeding on and enclose the case with more silk thread before positioning themselves with their head towards the posterior end of the case. It is during pupation when dimorphism occurs, with the females barely undergoing metamorphosis and coming out with a roughly worm-like appearance and the males undergoing significant metamorphosis into winged moths. Once the males emerge, they immediately leave their pupal case. However, females are wingless and stay in their case, adopting a relatively sedentary lifestyle. This has resulted in them evolving degenerate eyes, antennae, and legs in favor of an enlarged egg-sac. It has also resulted in the gender identification of M. corbetti to be limited to male characteristics.

=== Mating and reproduction ===
Since the female resides inside her case, oviposition occurs in the interior of the case. Females release pheromones to attract males. Males who want to mate with the female will assemble outside her case and extend his extensive abdomen (which can expand to twice its size during mating) into the female's pupal exuviae. The completion of mating is marked by the female's subsequent oviposition in the pupal skin, resulting in her shrinking to a blob-like mass that falls out of the case. This falling out creates an opening in the posterior of the case through which neonatal larvae crawl out from with the anchorage of a silken thread in some cases. Females have high reproductive potential (with a fecundity measure of over 3000 eggs/female) and in combination with their relatively long time to complete the larval period (about 12-17 weeks in a 5 month life cycle), M. corbetti are efficient at creating outbreak situations.

== Hosts ==
As a polyphagous pest species, the larvae of M. corbetti attack the leaves of plants of about 37 genera in 20 families, with their preferred host families being Fabaceae (to which legume species belong) and Arecaceae (to which the oil palm species belong). The larva of M. corbetti attack the leaves in an aggressively destructive manner and the resulting defoliation causes major crop losses, often on economically important plants. Once the larvae start eating the leaves, the leaves turn yellowish in color and fall down upon their death.

During the larva stage, the early instars of M. corbetti use their mandibles to scrape on the surface of the leaf. This produces holes which cause the leaf to change color and fall prematurely. The leaf tissue also undergoes necrosis and eventual skeletonisation as a result of this scraping. As the instars mature and become larger, they start cutting the leaf and eventually start chewing the leaf from the margins, causing intense scarring and damage to the leaves. These larvae feed the most in bright sunlight, so they eat most actively in the day.

== Parasitoids, predators, and local enemies ==
The local population size of M. corbetti is controlled by natural enemies, which vary from palm to palm. In East Malaysia, six species of hymenopterous parasitoids (including Braconidae, Ichneumonidae, and Eulophidae) and five species of dipterous parasitoids (all Tachinidae) are natural predators of this species. In Singapore, the cleric beetle (Callimeris bellus) is a larval predator of M. corbetti. In a study done on the M. corbetti population in the region bordering India and Bangladesh, two parasitoid species were identified to be naturally parasitizing the M. corbetti larvae. These species were identified as an unidentified tachinid fly from the order Diptera and an Ichneumon wasp (Enteromorpha spp.). Although the first reports of M. corbetti in this area were in 2015-2016, this may be inaccurate. It is hypothesized that this species may have entered this area earlier but was unable to attain pest status due to the high parasitoid levels here.

== Cultural/economic impact ==
Mahasena corbetti infestations in Malaysia have accrued a crop loss in excess of 40-50% in the span of two years, resulting in severe economic losses. This is because a moderate defoliation of 10-30% can result in 33-40% crop loss.

Although Bt sprays are the current mode of treatment for M. corbetti control, chemical treatments ineffective after bagworm larvae have metamorphosed to the pupal stage.
