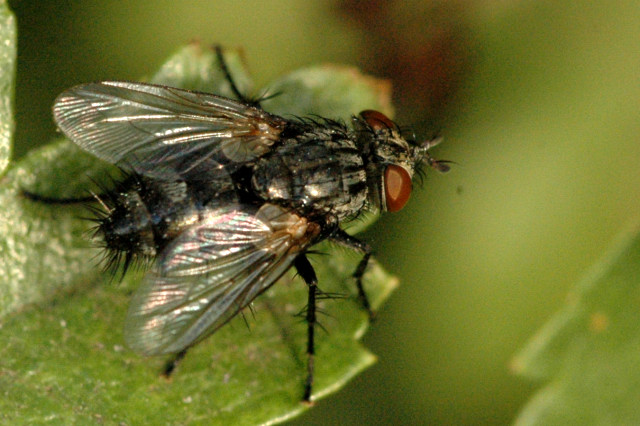
- Exorista larvarum

Scientific classification
- Kingdom: Animalia
- Phylum: Arthropoda
- Class: Insecta
- Order: Diptera
- Family: Tachinidae
- Subfamily: Exoristinae
- Tribe: Exoristini

= Exoristini =

Tribe of flies

Exoristini is a tribe of flies in the family Tachinidae.

== Genera ==
- Alloprosopaea Villeneuve, 1923
- Austrophorocera Townsend, 1916
- Bessa Robineau-Desvoidy, 1863
- Chaetexorista Brauer & von Bergenstamm, 1894
- Chaetoria Becker, 1908
- Chetogena Rondani, 1856
- Crassicornia Kugler, 1980
- Ctenophorinia Mesnil, 1963
- Eozenillia Townsend, 1926
- Exorista Meigen, 1803
- Gueriniopsis Reinhard, 1943
- Hillomyia Crosskey, 1973
- Macrohoughiopsis Townsend, 1927
- Maculosalia Mesnil, 1946
- Metaphorocera Thompson, 1968
- Neophryxe Townsend, 1916
- Parasetigena Brauer & von Bergenstamm, 1891
- Phorcidella Mesnil, 1946
- Phorinia Robineau-Desvoidy, 1830
- Phorocera Robineau-Desvoidy, 1830
- Stomatotachina Townsend, 1931
- Tachinomyia Townsend, 1892
