= Acemya oestriformis =

Scientific classification
- Kingdom: Animalia
- Phylum: Arthropoda
- Class: Insecta
- Order: Diptera
- Family: Tachinidae
- Subfamily: Exoristinae
- Tribe: Acemyini
- Genus: Acemya
- Species: A. oestriformis

Binomial name
- Acemya oestriformis (Brauer & Bergenstamm, 1891)

Synonyms
- Hemithrixion oestriforme Brauer & Bergenstamm, 1891

Species of fly

Acemya oestriformis is a species of fly in the family Tachinidae.

== Distribution ==
Canada, United States.

== Hosts ==
Boopedon nubilum, Camnula pellucida, Melanoplus bivittatus, Melanoplus bruneri, Melanoplus sanguinipes.
