= Eumorsea pinaleno =

Conservation status
- Vulnerable (IUCN 2.3)

Scientific classification
- Kingdom: Animalia
- Phylum: Arthropoda
- Class: Insecta
- Order: Orthoptera
- Suborder: Caelifera
- Family: Eumastacidae
- Genus: Eumorsea
- Species: E. pinaleno

Binomial name
- Eumorsea pinaleno Rehn & Grant, 1959

Species of grasshopper

Eumorsea pinaleno is a species of grasshopper in the family Eumastacidae. It is endemic to the Arizona in the United States, where it is likely restricted to the Pinaleno Mountains. It is known commonly as the Pinaleno monkey grasshopper.

This grasshopper has an elongated body 8 to 24 millimeters long and long legs. It has no wings. Little is known about the biology of the species.
