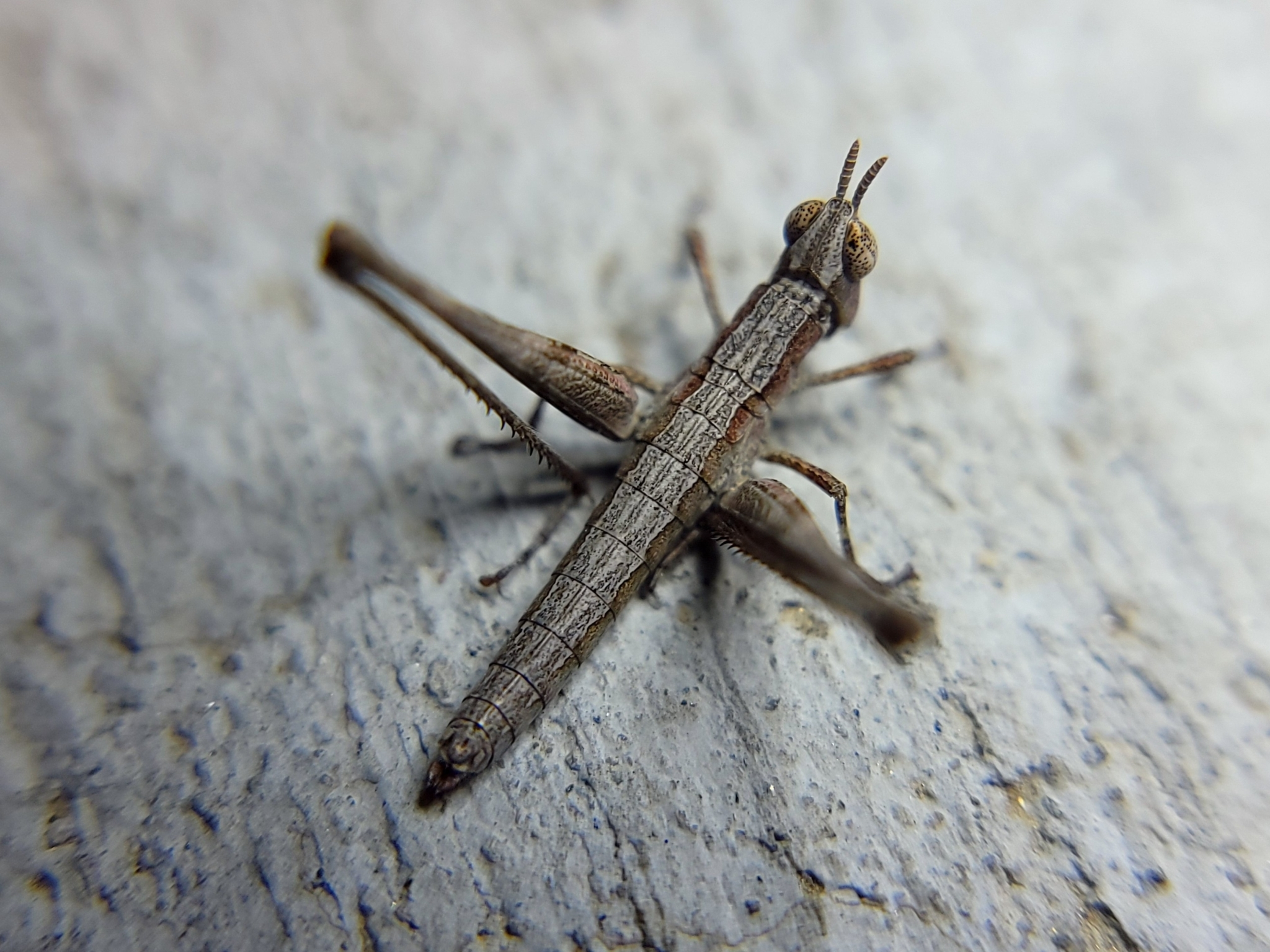

Scientific classification
- Kingdom: Animalia
- Phylum: Arthropoda
- Class: Insecta
- Order: Orthoptera
- Suborder: Caelifera
- Family: Eumastacidae
- Subfamily: Morseinae
- Genus: Morsea
- Species: M. californica

Binomial name
- Morsea californica Scudder, 1898

= Morsea californica =

Species of grasshopper

Morsea californica, the chaparral monkey grasshopper, is a species of monkey grasshopper in the family Eumastacidae. It is found in North America.
