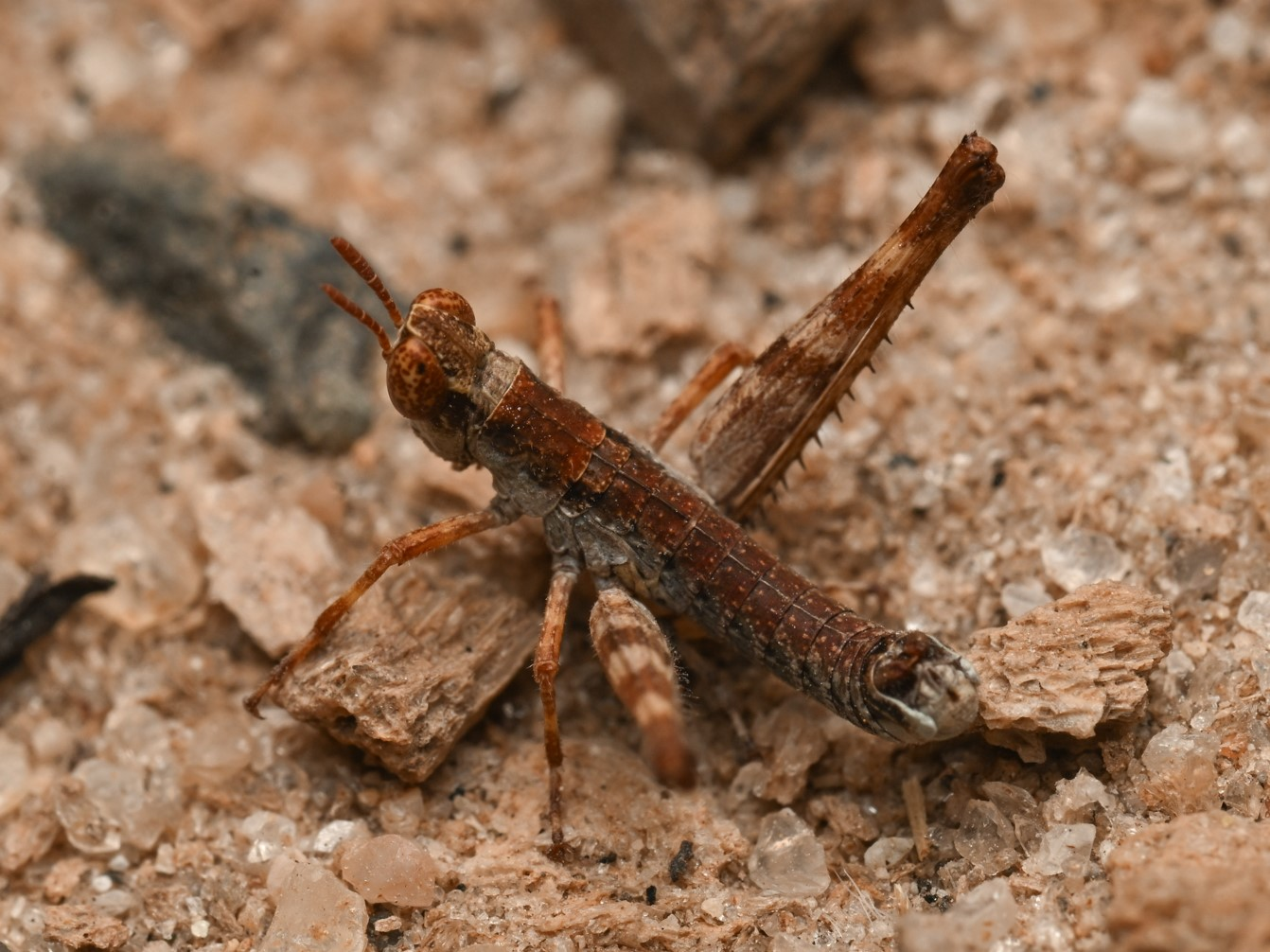

Scientific classification
- Kingdom: Animalia
- Phylum: Arthropoda
- Class: Insecta
- Order: Orthoptera
- Suborder: Caelifera
- Family: Eumastacidae
- Subfamily: Morseinae
- Genus: Morsea
- Species: M. piute

Binomial name
- Morsea piute Rehn & Grant, 1958

= Morsea piute =

Species of grasshopper

Morsea piute, the piute monkey grasshopper, is a species of monkey grasshopper in the family Eumastacidae. It is found in North America.
