= Acemya acuticornis =

Scientific classification
- Kingdom: Animalia
- Phylum: Arthropoda
- Class: Insecta
- Order: Diptera
- Family: Tachinidae
- Subfamily: Exoristinae
- Tribe: Acemyini
- Genus: Acemya
- Species: A. acuticornis

Binomial name
- Acemya acuticornis (Meigen, 1824)

Synonyms
- Acemya myoidea Robineau-Desvoidy, 1830; Acemya oblonga Robineau-Desvoidy, 1830; Acemya subrotunda Robineau-Desvoidy, 1830; Agculocera grisea Kowarz, 1868; Agculocera nigra Macquart, 1855; Myobia fuscipalpis Perris, 1852; Tachina acuticornis Meigen, 1824; Tachina albinervis Zetterstedt, 1844; Tachina angulicornis Zetterstedt, 1844; Tachina punctiventris Zetterstedt, 1859; Xysta grisea Zetterstedt, 1838; Zophomyia nudioculata Macquart, 1855; Zophomyia nudistylum Macquart, 1855

Species of fly

Acemya acuticornis is a species of fly in the family Tachinidae. It is a parasitoid of solitary locusts and can be found in from West Europe to Mongolia.

== Distribution ==
Czech Republic, Estonia, Hungary, Poland, Romania, Slovakia, Ukraine, Finland, Sweden, Bulgaria, Croatia, Cyprus, Greece, Italy, Macedonia, Slovenia, Spain, Turkey, Austria, Belgium, France, Germany, Netherlands, Mongolia, Tunisia, Russia, Transcaucasia.
