= Ceracia mucronifera =

Scientific classification
- Kingdom: Animalia
- Phylum: Arthropoda
- Class: Insecta
- Order: Diptera
- Family: Tachinidae
- Subfamily: Exoristinae
- Tribe: Acemyini
- Genus: Ceracia
- Species: C. mucronifera

Binomial name
- Ceracia mucronifera Rondani, 1865

Synonyms
- Masicera acuminata Becker, 1908; Myothyria benoisti Mesnil, 1959; Myothyria nigrita Mesnil, 1962; Pamphagophaga gomerana Enderlein, 1930

Species of fly

Ceracia mucronifera is a species of fly in the family Tachinidae.

== Distribution ==
Bulgaria, Croatia, Greece, Italy, Portugal, Spain, Turkey, France, Israel, Canary Islands, Morocco, Yemen, China.
