= Morsea catalinae =

Scientific classification
- Domain: Eukaryota
- Kingdom: Animalia
- Phylum: Arthropoda
- Class: Insecta
- Order: Orthoptera
- Suborder: Caelifera
- Family: Eumastacidae
- Subfamily: Morseinae
- Genus: Morsea
- Species: M. catalinae

Binomial name
- Morsea catalinae Rentz & Weissman, 1981

Species of grasshopper

Morsea catalinae, the Catalina monkey grasshopper, is a species of monkey grasshopper in the family Eumastacidae. It is found in North America.
