= Morsea dumicola =

Scientific classification
- Domain: Eukaryota
- Kingdom: Animalia
- Phylum: Arthropoda
- Class: Insecta
- Order: Orthoptera
- Suborder: Caelifera
- Family: Eumastacidae
- Subfamily: Morseinae
- Genus: Morsea
- Species: M. dumicola

Binomial name
- Morsea dumicola Rehn & Hebard, 1918

Species of grasshopper

Morsea dumicola, the yavapai monkey grasshopper, is a species of monkey grasshopper in the family Eumastacidae. It is found in North America.
