= A. indica =

A. indica may refer to:

- Acalypha indica, a plant species found throughout tropical Africa and South Africa, in India and Sri Lanka, as well as in Yemen
- Acemya indica, a tachinid fly species
- Acromantis indica, the Burmese mantis, a praying mantis species found in Myanmar
- Amantis indica, a praying mantis species native to India
- Anteaeolidiella indica, a species of sea slug
- Aristolochia indica, a creeper plant species found in Kerala in India and also in Sri Lanka
- Atuna indica, a plant species endemic to India
- Awasthiella indica, a fungus species
- Azadirachta indica, the neem, a tree species

== See also ==
- Indica (disambiguation)
