= Acemya pyrrhocera =

Scientific classification
- Kingdom: Animalia
- Phylum: Arthropoda
- Class: Insecta
- Order: Diptera
- Family: Tachinidae
- Subfamily: Exoristinae
- Tribe: Acemyini
- Genus: Acemya
- Species: A. pyrrhocera

Binomial name
- Acemya pyrrhocera (Villeneuve, 1922)

Synonyms
- Acomyia pyrrhocera Villeneuve, 1922

Species of fly

Acemya pyrrhocera is a species of fly in the family Tachinidae.

== Distribution ==
Tajikistan, China, Italy, Spain, France, Mongolia, Russia, United Arab Emirates.
