= Acemya plankii =

Scientific classification
- Kingdom: Animalia
- Phylum: Arthropoda
- Clade: Pancrustacea
- Class: Insecta
- Order: Diptera
- Family: Tachinidae
- Subfamily: Exoristinae
- Tribe: Acemyini
- Genus: Acemya
- Species: A. plankii

Binomial name
- Acemya plankii (Walton, 1915)

Synonyms
- Coquillettina plankii Walton, 1915

Species of fly

Acemya plankii is a species of fly in the family Tachinidae.

== Distribution ==
Acemya plankii is found in the United States.
