= Psychomastax inyo =

Scientific classification
- Domain: Eukaryota
- Kingdom: Animalia
- Phylum: Arthropoda
- Class: Insecta
- Order: Orthoptera
- Suborder: Caelifera
- Family: Eumastacidae
- Subfamily: Morseinae
- Genus: Psychomastax
- Species: P. inyo

Binomial name
- Psychomastax inyo Rehn & Grant, 1959

Species of grasshopper

Psychomastax inyo, the White Mountain grasshopper, is a species of monkey grasshopper in the family Eumastacidae. It is found in North America.
