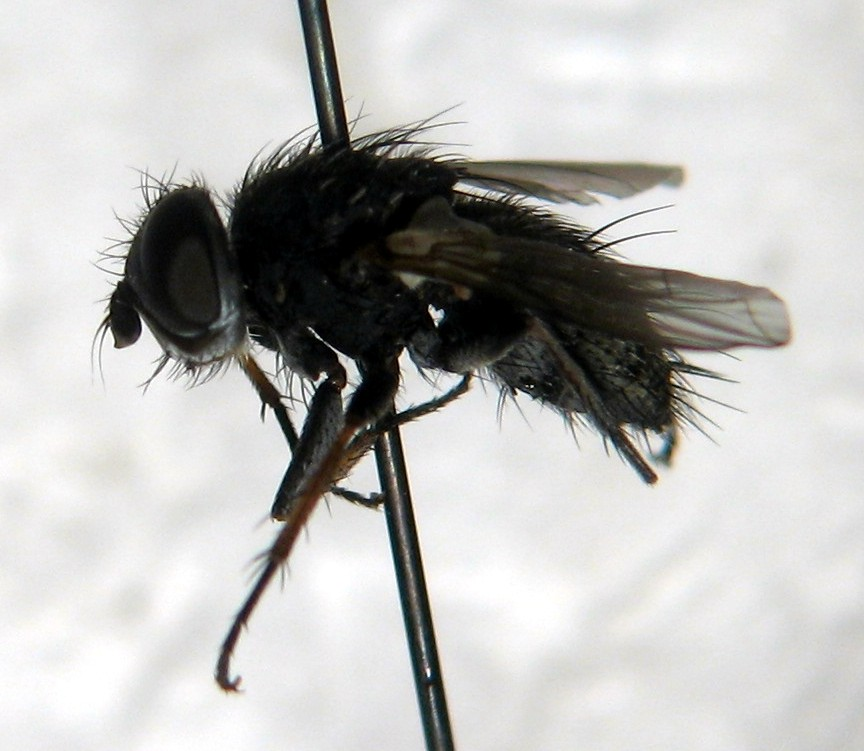

Scientific classification
- Kingdom: Animalia
- Phylum: Arthropoda
- Class: Insecta
- Order: Diptera
- Family: Tachinidae
- Subfamily: Exoristinae
- Tribe: Acemyini
- Genus: Acemya
- Species: A. rufitibia

Binomial name
- Acemya rufitibia (von Roser, 1840)

Synonyms
- Acemya angiostoma Brauer & von Berganstamm, 1891; Acemya csikii Kertész, 1901; Agculocera cinerea Mik, 1866; Tachina rufitibia Roser, 1840

= Acemya rufitibia =

Species of fly

Acemya rufitibia is a species of fly in the family Tachinidae.

== Distribution ==
Czech Republic, Hungary, Poland, Slovakia, Finland, Sweden, Bulgaria, Greece, Italy, Serbia, Spain, Turkey, Austria, France, Germany, Switzerland, Russia, Transcaucasia, China.
