= Acemya fishelsoni =

Scientific classification
- Kingdom: Animalia
- Phylum: Arthropoda
- Class: Insecta
- Order: Diptera
- Family: Tachinidae
- Subfamily: Exoristinae
- Tribe: Acemyini
- Genus: Acemya
- Species: A. fishelsoni

Binomial name
- Acemya fishelsoni Kugler, 1968

Species of fly

Acemya fishelsoni is a species of fly in the family Tachinidae.

== Distribution ==
China, Israel, Mongolia, Yemen.
