= Ceracia dentata =

Scientific classification
- Kingdom: Animalia
- Phylum: Arthropoda
- Class: Insecta
- Order: Diptera
- Family: Tachinidae
- Subfamily: Exoristinae
- Tribe: Acemyini
- Genus: Ceracia
- Species: C. dentata

Binomial name
- Ceracia dentata (Coquillett, 1895)

Synonyms
- Acemyia dentata Coquillett, 1895

Species of fly

Ceracia dentata is a species of fly in the family Tachinidae.

== Distribution ==
Canada, United States, Mexico, Chile.
