= Metacemyia calloti =

Scientific classification
- Kingdom: Animalia
- Phylum: Arthropoda
- Clade: Pancrustacea
- Class: Insecta
- Order: Diptera
- Family: Tachinidae
- Subfamily: Exoristinae
- Tribe: Acemyini
- Genus: Metacemyia
- Species: M. calloti

Binomial name
- Metacemyia calloti (Séguy, 1936)

Synonyms
- Acemya calloti Séguy, 1936; Acemyia calloti Séguy, 1936; Ceracia nomadacridis Emden, 1960

Species of fly

Metacemyia calloti is a species of fly in the family Tachinidae. It is a parasitoid of Anacridium aegyptium.

== Distribution ==
Corse, Italy, Malta, Spain, Turkey, France, Israel, Tunisia, Senegal, Tanzania, U.A. Emirates, Yemen, Zambia, Zimbabwe.
