= Eumorsea balli =

Scientific classification
- Domain: Eukaryota
- Kingdom: Animalia
- Phylum: Arthropoda
- Class: Insecta
- Order: Orthoptera
- Suborder: Caelifera
- Family: Eumastacidae
- Subfamily: Morseinae
- Genus: Eumorsea
- Species: E. balli

Binomial name
- Eumorsea balli Hebard, 1935

Species of grasshopper

Eumorsea balli, known generally as the huachuca monkey grasshopper or Ball's monkey grasshopper, is a species of monkey grasshopper in the family Eumastacidae. It is found in North America.
