= Psychomastax deserticola =

Conservation status
- Vulnerable (IUCN 2.3)

Scientific classification
- Kingdom: Animalia
- Phylum: Arthropoda
- Class: Insecta
- Order: Orthoptera
- Suborder: Caelifera
- Family: Eumastacidae
- Genus: Psychomastax
- Species: P. deserticola

Binomial name
- Psychomastax deserticola Hebard, 1934

Species of grasshopper

Psychomastax deserticola, the desert monkey grasshopper, is a species of monkey grasshopper in the family Eumastacidae. It is found in North America.

The IUCN conservation status of Psychomastax deserticola is "VU", vulnerable. The species faces a high risk of endangerment in the medium term. The IUCN status was reviewed in 1996.

== Subspecies ==
These two subspecies belong to the species Psychomastax deserticola:

- Psychomastax deserticola deserticola Hebard, 1934
- Psychomastax deserticola indigena Rehn & Grant, 1959
