= Hygiella nigripes =

Scientific classification
- Kingdom: Animalia
- Phylum: Arthropoda
- Class: Insecta
- Order: Diptera
- Family: Tachinidae
- Subfamily: Exoristinae
- Tribe: Acemyini
- Genus: Hygiella
- Species: H. nigripes

Binomial name
- Hygiella nigripes Mesnil, 1968

Species of fly

Hygiella nigripes is a species of fly in the family Tachinidae.

== Distribution ==
India, Vietnam.
