= Acemya tibialis =

Scientific classification
- Kingdom: Animalia
- Phylum: Arthropoda
- Class: Insecta
- Order: Diptera
- Family: Tachinidae
- Subfamily: Exoristinae
- Tribe: Acemyini
- Genus: Acemya
- Species: A. tibialis

Binomial name
- Acemya tibialis (Coquillett, 1897)

Synonyms
- Acemyia tibialis Coquillett, 1897

Species of fly

Acemya tibialis is a species of fly in the family Tachinidae.

== Distribution ==
The Acemya tibialis can be found in the Nearctic region of North America.

More specifically, in the areas listed below:

- Canada
  - British Columbia
  - Eastern Canada
  - Ontario
  - The Prairies
  - The Yukon
- United States
  - California
  - The Great Plains
  - Northeast USA
  - Northern Rockies
  - Pacific Northwest
  - Southwest USA
  - Texas
