= Acemya favilla =

Scientific classification
- Kingdom: Animalia
- Phylum: Arthropoda
- Class: Insecta
- Order: Diptera
- Family: Tachinidae
- Subfamily: Exoristinae
- Tribe: Acemyini
- Genus: Acemya
- Species: A. favilla

Binomial name
- Acemya favilla Reinhard, 1974

Species of fly

Acemya favilla is a species of fly in the family Tachinidae.

== Distribution ==
Canada, United States.
