= Ceracia brachyptera =

Scientific classification
- Kingdom: Animalia
- Phylum: Arthropoda
- Class: Insecta
- Order: Diptera
- Family: Tachinidae
- Subfamily: Exoristinae
- Tribe: Acemyini
- Genus: Ceracia
- Species: C. brachyptera

Binomial name
- Ceracia brachyptera (Thomson, 1869)

Synonyms
- Clythopsis confundens Townsend, 1927; Myobia brachyptera Thomson, 1869

Species of fly

Ceracia brachyptera is a species of fly in the family Tachinidae.

== Distribution ==
Brazil.
