= Acemya asiatica =

Scientific classification
- Kingdom: Animalia
- Phylum: Arthropoda
- Class: Insecta
- Order: Diptera
- Family: Tachinidae
- Subfamily: Exoristinae
- Tribe: Acemyini
- Genus: Acemya
- Species: A. asiatica

Binomial name
- Acemya asiatica Mesnil, 1963

Synonyms
- Acemya tibialis Mesnil, 1962

Species of fly

Acemya asiatica is a species of fly in the family Tachinidae.

== Distribution ==
Tajikistan.
