= Metacemyia =

Scientific classification
- Kingdom: Animalia
- Phylum: Arthropoda
- Clade: Pancrustacea
- Class: Insecta
- Order: Diptera
- Family: Tachinidae
- Subfamily: Exoristinae
- Tribe: Acemyini
- Genus: Metacemyia; Herting, 1969

Type species
- Acemyia calloti Séguy, 1936

Genus of flies

Metacemyia is a genus of flies in the family Tachinidae.

== Species ==
- Metacemyia aartseni Zeegers, 2007
- Metacemyia calloti (Séguy, 1936)
- Metacemyia setosa Crosskey, 1973
- Metacemyia uncinata (Thomson, 1869)
