= Eoacemyia =

Scientific classification
- Kingdom: Animalia
- Phylum: Arthropoda
- Clade: Pancrustacea
- Class: Insecta
- Order: Diptera
- Family: Tachinidae
- Subfamily: Exoristinae
- Tribe: Acemyini
- Genus: Eoacemyia; Townsend, 1926

Type species
- Tachina errans Wiedemann, 1824

Genus of flies

Eoacemyia is a genus of bristle flies in the family Tachinidae.

== Species ==
- Eoacemyia errans (Wiedemann, 1824)

== Distribution ==
China, India, Sumatra, Malaysia, Singapore, Papua New Guinea.
