= Charitella =

Scientific classification
- Kingdom: Animalia
- Phylum: Arthropoda
- Class: Insecta
- Order: Diptera
- Family: Tachinidae
- Subfamily: Exoristinae
- Tribe: Acemyini
- Genus: Charitella; Mesnil, 1957

Type species
- Charitella gracilis Mesnil, 1957

Synonyms
- Metadrinomyia Shima, 1980

Genus of flies

Charitella is a genus of flies in the family Tachinidae.

== Species ==
- Charitella argentea (Shima, 1980)
- Charitella flavifrons (Byun & Han, 2009)
- Charitella gracilis Mesnil, 1957
- Charitella nigrescens Mesnil, 1977
- Charitella proclinata (Shima, 1980)
- Charitella whitmorei (Cerretti, 2012)
- Charitella xanthokolos (Byun & Han, 2009)
