= Hygiella =

Scientific classification
- Kingdom: Animalia
- Phylum: Arthropoda
- Class: Insecta
- Order: Diptera
- Family: Tachinidae
- Subfamily: Exoristinae
- Tribe: Acemyini
- Genus: Hygiella; Mesnil, 1957

Type species
- Hygiella pygidialis Mesnil, 1957

Genus of flies

Hygiella is a genus of flies in the family Tachinidae. The genus was originally placed in the tribe Blondeliini; however, Shima and Tachi (2016) assigned it to the tribe Acemyini.

== Species ==
- Hygiella angustifrons Shima & Tachi, 2016
- Hygiella luteipes Shima & Tachi, 2016
- Hygiella nigripes Mesnil, 1968
- Hygiella proclinata Shima & Tachi, 2016
- Hygiella pygidialis Mesnil, 1957
