= Boopedon auriventris =

Scientific classification
- Kingdom: Animalia
- Phylum: Arthropoda
- Clade: Pancrustacea
- Class: Insecta
- Order: Orthoptera
- Suborder: Caelifera
- Family: Acrididae
- Genus: Boopedon
- Species: B. auriventris

Binomial name
- Boopedon auriventris McNeill, 1899

Species of grasshopper

Boopedon auriventris, the short-winged boopie, is a species of slant-faced grasshopper in the family Acrididae. It is found in North America.
