= Acemya indica =

Scientific classification
- Kingdom: Animalia
- Phylum: Arthropoda
- Class: Insecta
- Order: Diptera
- Family: Tachinidae
- Subfamily: Exoristinae
- Tribe: Acemyini
- Genus: Acemya
- Species: A. indica

Binomial name
- Acemya indica Mesnil, 1968

Species of fly

Acemya indica is a species of fly in the family Tachinidae.

== Distribution ==
India, Lesser Sunda Islands.
