= Boopedon gracile =

Scientific classification
- Kingdom: Animalia
- Phylum: Arthropoda
- Clade: Pancrustacea
- Class: Insecta
- Order: Orthoptera
- Suborder: Caelifera
- Family: Acrididae
- Subfamily: Gomphocerinae
- Genus: Boopedon
- Species: B. gracile

Binomial name
- Boopedon gracile Rehn, 1904

Species of grasshopper

Boopedon gracile, known generally as the prairie boopie or graceful range grasshopper, is a species of slant-faced grasshopper in the family Acrididae. It is found in Central America and North America.
