= Morsea =

Scientific classification
- Domain: Eukaryota
- Kingdom: Animalia
- Phylum: Arthropoda
- Class: Insecta
- Order: Orthoptera
- Suborder: Caelifera
- Family: Eumastacidae
- Subfamily: Morseinae
- Genus: Morsea; Scudder, 1898

Genus of grasshoppers

Morsea is a genus of monkey grasshoppers in the family Eumastacidae. There are about seven described species in Morsea.

== Species ==
These seven species belong to the genus Morsea:

- Morsea californica Scudder, 1898 (chaparral monkey grasshopper)
- Morsea catalinae Rentz & Weissman, 1981 (Catalina monkey grasshopper)
- Morsea dumicola Rehn & Hebard, 1918 (yavapai monkey grasshopper)
- Morsea islandica Rentz & Weissman, 1981 (island monkey grasshopper)
- Morsea kaibabensis Rehn & Grant, 1958 (kaibab monkey grasshopper)
- Morsea piute Rehn & Grant, 1958 (piute monkey grasshopper)
- Morsea tamalpaisensis Rehn & Hebard, 1909 (tamalpais monkey grasshopper)
