= Acemya masurius =

Scientific classification
- Kingdom: Animalia
- Phylum: Arthropoda
- Class: Insecta
- Order: Diptera
- Family: Tachinidae
- Genus: Acemya
- Species: A. masurius

Binomial name
- Acemya masurius (Walker, 1849)

Species of fly

Acemya masurius is a species of bristle fly in the family Tachinidae.
