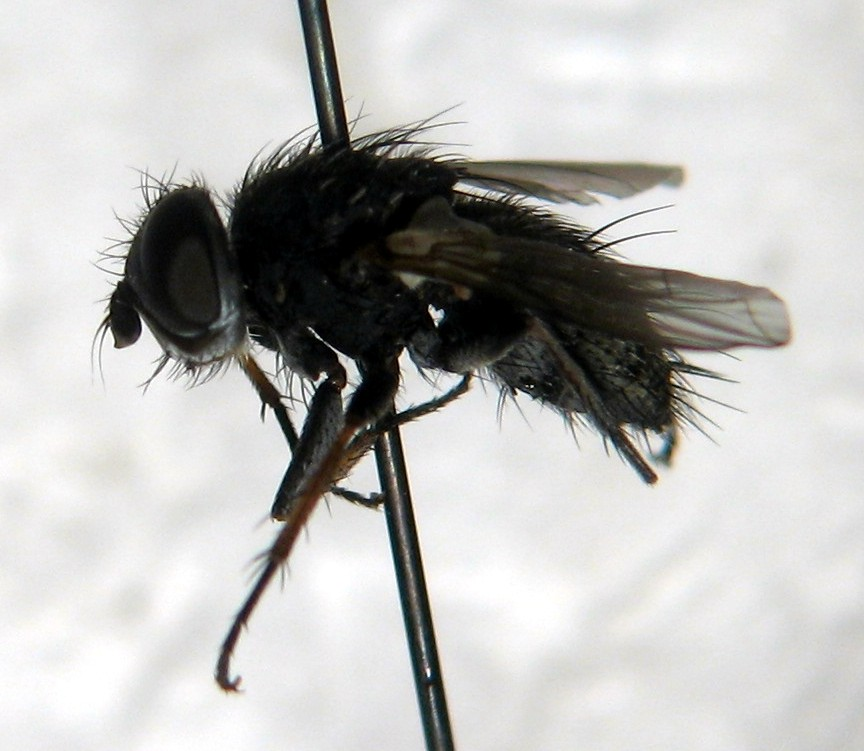
- Acemya rufitibia

Scientific classification
- Kingdom: Animalia
- Phylum: Arthropoda
- Class: Insecta
- Order: Diptera
- Family: Tachinidae
- Subfamily: Exoristinae
- Tribe: Acemyini
- Genus: Acemya; Robineau-Desvoidy, 1830

Type species
- Acemya oblonga Robineau-Desvoidy, 1830

Synonyms
- Acemyia Coquillett, 1897; Acemyia Lioy, 1864; Acomyia Agassiz, 1846; Agculocera Macquart, 1855; Ancylocera Gerstaecker, 1856; Ancylocera Mik, 1866; Coquillettina Walton, 1915; Euacemyia Townsend, 1912; Hemithrixion Brauer & von Berganstamm, 1891; Onuxicera Macquart, 1855; Onychocera Mik, 1866

= Acemya =

Genus of flies

Acemya is a genus of flies in the family Tachinidae.

== Species ==
- Acemya acuticornis (Meigen, 1824)
- Acemya asiatica Mesnil, 1963
- Acemya favilla Reinhard, 1974
- Acemya fishelsoni Kugler, 1968
- Acemya indica Mesnil, 1968
- Acemya masurius (Walker, 1849)
- Acemya oestriformis (Brauer & Bergenstamm, 1891)
- Acemya plankii (Walton, 1915)
- Acemya pyrrhocera (Villeneuve, 1922)
- Acemya rufitibia (von Roser, 1840)
- Acemya tibialis (Coquillett, 1897)
