= Atlantomyia =

Scientific classification
- Kingdom: Animalia
- Phylum: Arthropoda
- Class: Insecta
- Order: Diptera
- Family: Tachinidae
- Subfamily: Exoristinae
- Tribe: Acemyini
- Genus: Atlantomyia; Crosskey, 1977

Type species
- Atlantomyia nitida Crosskey, 1977

Genus of flies

Atlantomyia is a genus of flies in the family Tachinidae.

== Specia ==
- Atlantomyia nitida Crosskey, 1977

== Distribution ==
Saint Helena.
