= Psychomastax =

Scientific classification
- Domain: Eukaryota
- Kingdom: Animalia
- Phylum: Arthropoda
- Class: Insecta
- Order: Orthoptera
- Suborder: Caelifera
- Family: Eumastacidae
- Subfamily: Morseinae
- Genus: Psychomastax; Rehn & Hebard, 1918

Genus of grasshoppers

Psychomastax is a genus of monkey grasshoppers in the family Eumastacidae. There are at least four described species in Psychomastax.

== Species ==
These four species belong to the genus Psychomastax:

- Psychomastax deserticola Hebard, 1934 (desert monkey grasshopper)
- Psychomastax inyo Rehn & Grant, 1959 (White Mountain grasshopper)
- Psychomastax psylla Rehn & Hebard, 1918 (San Jacinto monkey grasshopper)
- Psychomastax robusta Hebard, 1934 (robust monkey grasshopper)
