= Ceracia =

Scientific classification
- Kingdom: Animalia
- Phylum: Arthropoda
- Clade: Pancrustacea
- Class: Insecta
- Order: Diptera
- Family: Tachinidae
- Subfamily: Exoristinae
- Tribe: Acemyini
- Genus: Ceracia; Rondani, 1865

Type species
- Ceracia mucronifera Rondani, 1865

Synonyms
- Ceracya Rondani, 1865; Ceratia Brauer & von Bergenstamm, 1889; Myothyria Wulp, 1890; Ceratacia Bezzi, 1906; Acemyiopsis Townsend, 1915; Clythopsis Townsend, 1927; Pamphagophaga Enderlein, 1930

Genus of flies

Ceracia is a genus of bristle flies in the family Tachinidae.

== Species ==
- Ceracia africana (Mesnil, 1959)
- Ceracia armata (Malloch, 1930)
- Ceracia aurifrons Aldrich, 1933
- Ceracia brachyptera (Thomson, 1869)
- Ceracia dentata (Coquillett, 1895)
- Ceracia fergusoni (Malloch, 1930)
- Ceracia freyi (Herting, 1958)
- Ceracia majorina (Wulp, 1890)
- Ceracia mucronifera Rondani, 1865
- Ceracia murina Mesnil, 1977
- Ceracia punensis (Townsend, 1915)
- Ceracia stackelbergi (Mesnil, 1963)
- Ceracia subandina Blanchard, 1943
