= Eumorsea =

Scientific classification
- Domain: Eukaryota
- Kingdom: Animalia
- Phylum: Arthropoda
- Class: Insecta
- Order: Orthoptera
- Suborder: Caelifera
- Family: Eumastacidae
- Subfamily: Morseinae
- Genus: Eumorsea; Hebard, 1935

Genus of grasshoppers

Eumorsea is a genus of grasshoppers in the family Eumastacidae, the monkey grasshoppers.

Species include:

- Eumorsea balli – Ball's monkey grasshopper
- Eumorsea pinaleno – Pinaleno monkey grasshopper
- Eumorsea truncaticeps
