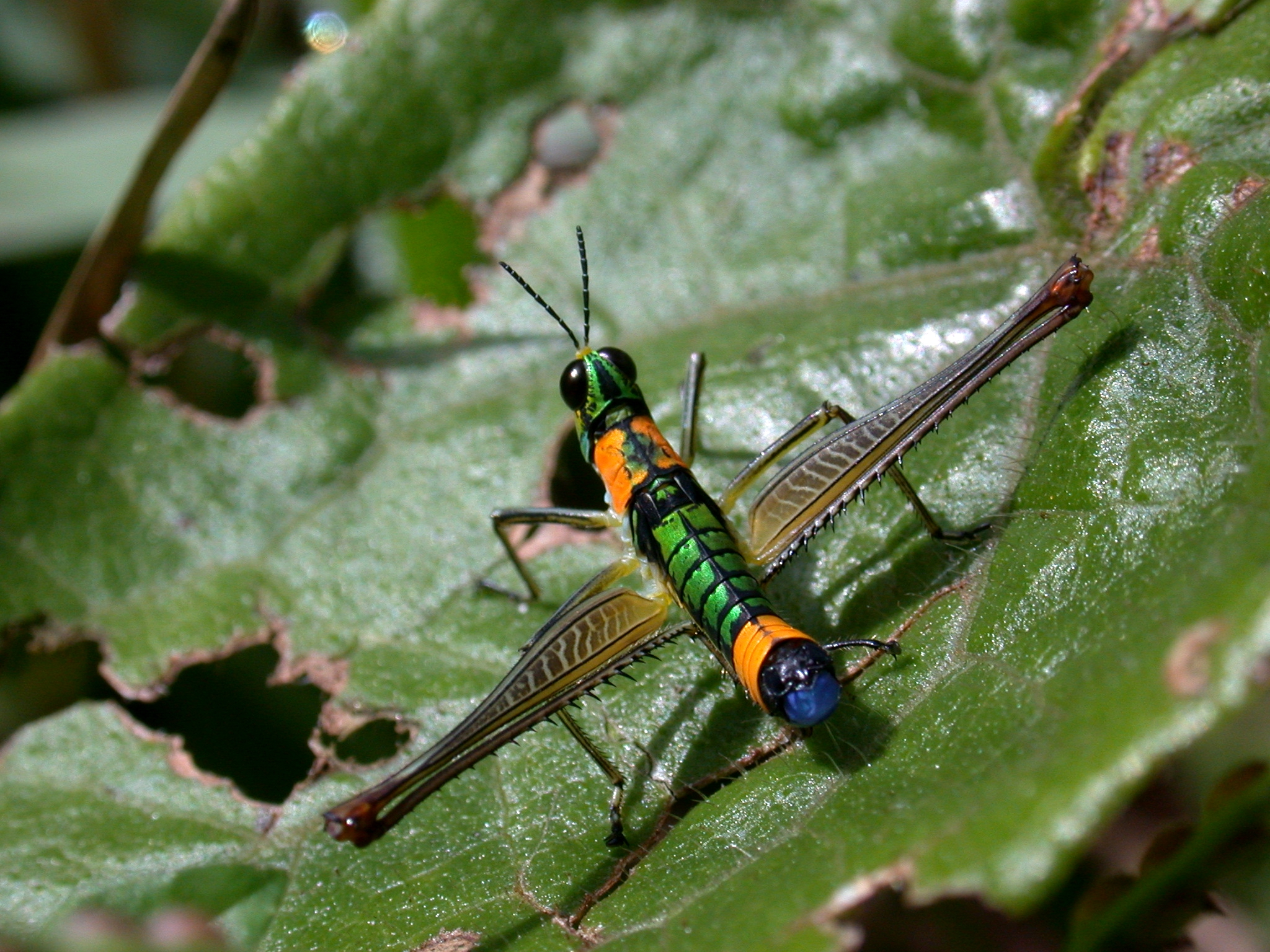
- Eumastax sp.

Scientific classification
- Domain: Eukaryota
- Kingdom: Animalia
- Phylum: Arthropoda
- Class: Insecta
- Order: Orthoptera
- Suborder: Caelifera
- Family: Eumastacidae
- Subfamily: Eumastacinae
- Genus: Eumastax; Burr. 1899

Synonyms
- Mastax Perty, 1832 (homonym)

= Eumastax =

Genus of grasshoppers

External image
- Images at iNaturalist

Eumastax is the type genus of grasshoppers in the family Eumastacidae, erected by Malcolm Burr in 1899 and found in of South America.

== Species ==
The Orthoptera Species File lists:

1. Eumastax andeana Descamps, 1979
2. Eumastax apolinari Hebard, 1923
3. Eumastax becharai Descamps, 1976
4. Eumastax dorsti Descamps, 1977
5. Eumastax equatoriana Descamps, 1973
6. Eumastax jagoi Descamps, 1971
7. Eumastax luteiventris Descamps, 1973
8. Eumastax megacephala Descamps, 1982
9. Eumastax minuta Bolívar, 1881
10. Eumastax nigrosignata Descamps, 1979
11. Eumastax nigrovittata Descamps, 1982
12. Eumastax pictipes Descamps, 1971
13. Eumastax poultoni Burr, 1899
14. Eumastax restrepoi Descamps, 1971
15. Eumastax rubigithorax Descamps, 1982
16. Eumastax rubriventris Descamps, 1982
17. Eumastax salazari Descamps, 1971
18. Eumastax simoni Descamps, 1971
19. Eumastax tenuis (Perty, 1832) - type species (as Mastax tenuis Perty)
20. Eumastax venezuelae Descamps, 1974
21. Eumastax vittata Burr, 1899
22. Eumastax vittiger Descamps, 1974
23. Eumastax vittithorax Descamps, 1974
24. Eumastax zumuniana Descamps, 1982
