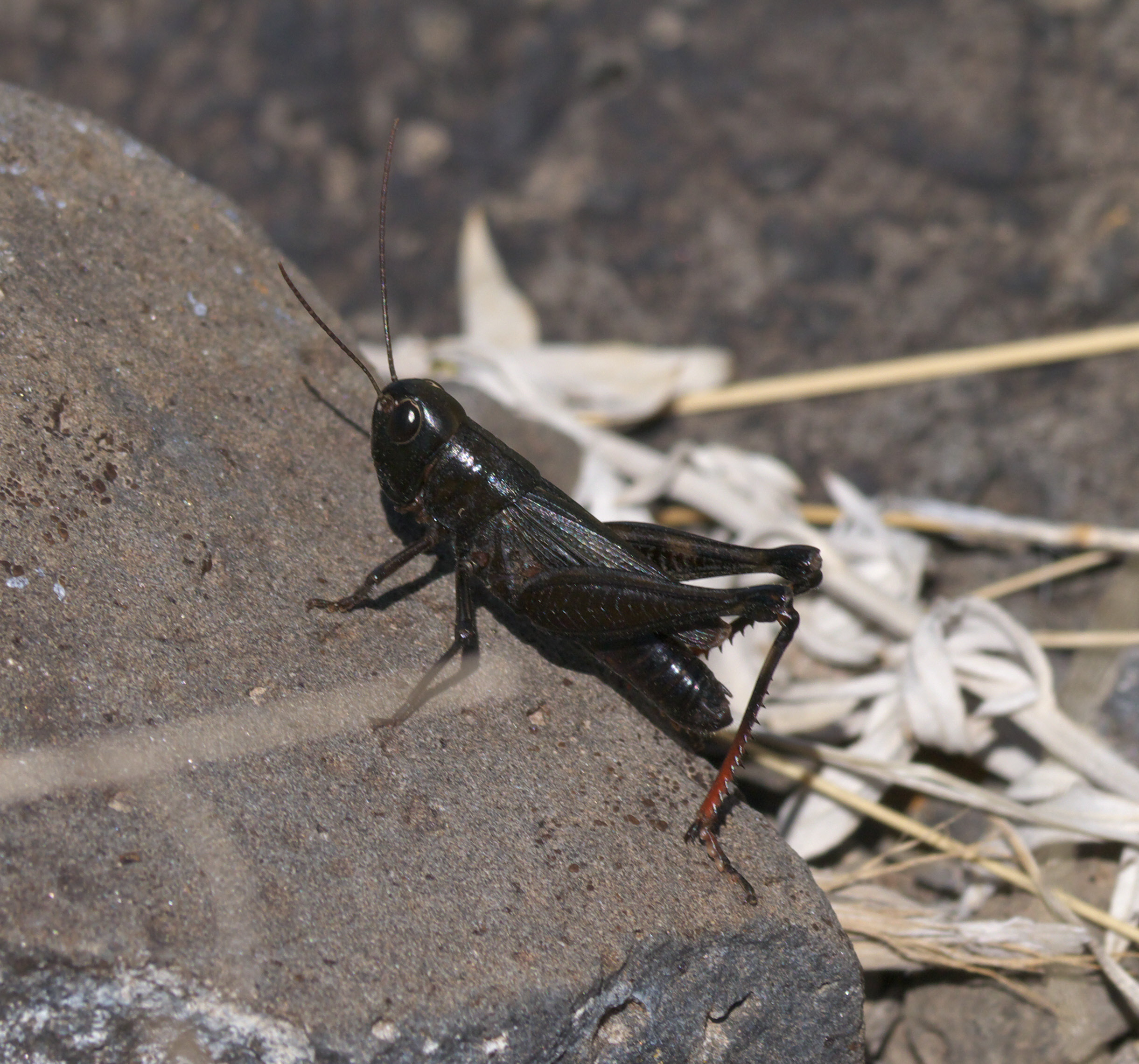
- Boopedon nubilum

Scientific classification
- Kingdom: Animalia
- Phylum: Arthropoda
- Clade: Pancrustacea
- Class: Insecta
- Order: Orthoptera
- Suborder: Caelifera
- Family: Acrididae
- Subfamily: Gomphocerinae
- Genus: Boopedon; Thomas, 1870

= Boopedon =

Genus of grasshoppers

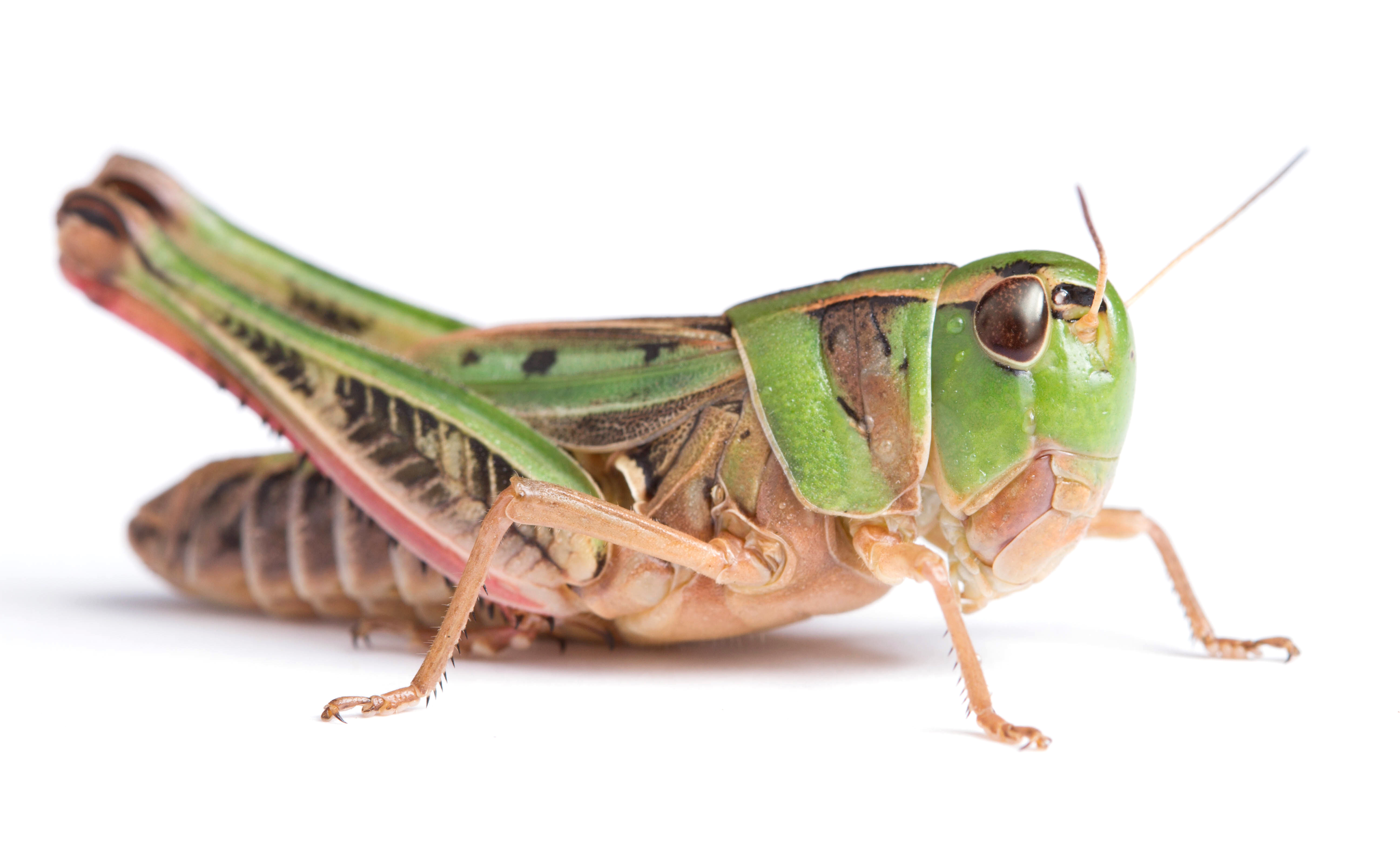
Unidentified Boopedon species

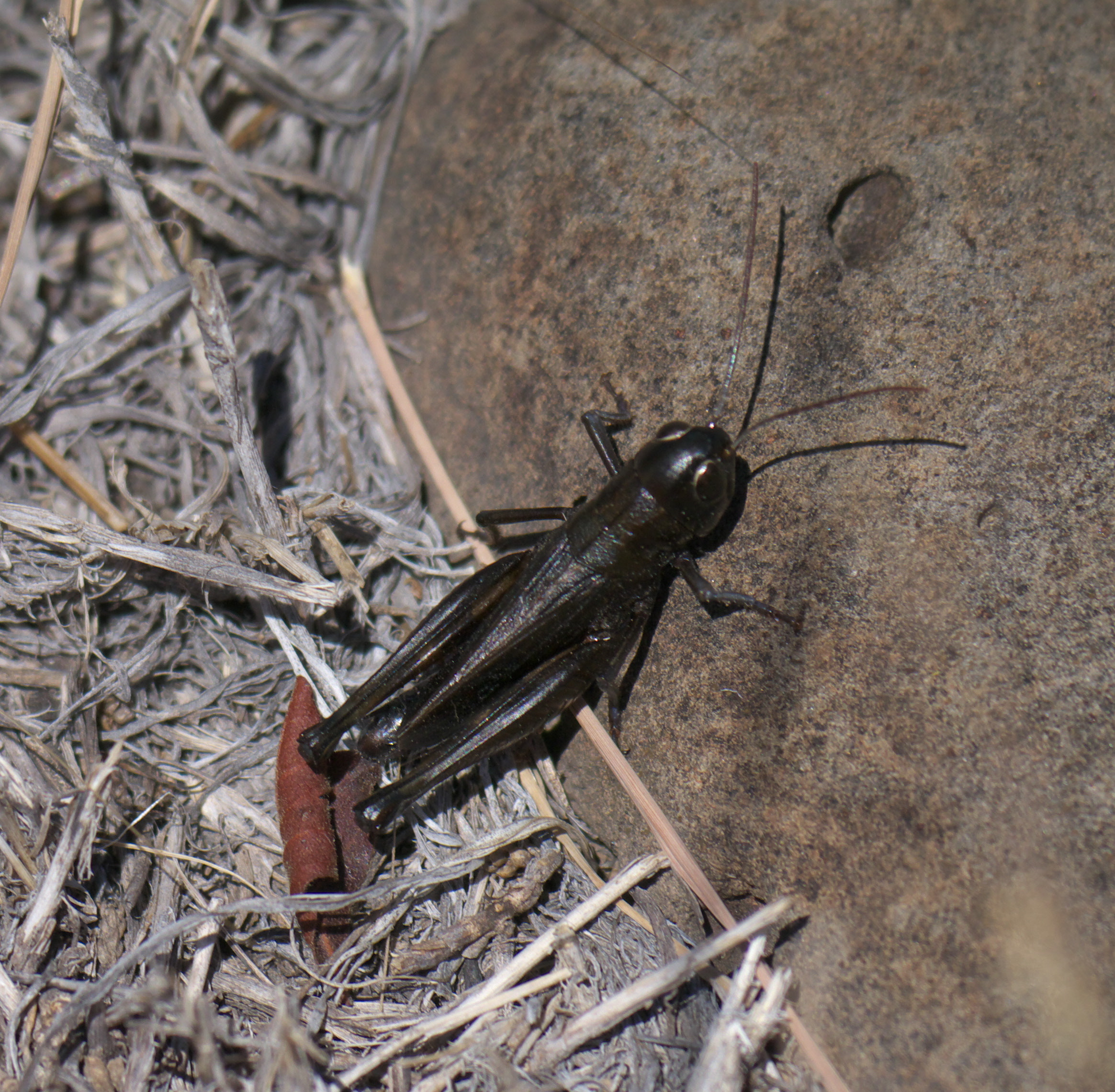
Boopedon nubilum

Boopedon is a genus of boopies in the family Acrididae. There are at least 8 described species in Boopedon.

== Species ==
- Boopedon auriventris McNeill, 1899 (short-winged boopie)
- Boopedon dampfi (Hebard, 1932)
- Boopedon diabolicum Bruner, 1904
- Boopedon empelios Otte, 1979
- Boopedon flaviventris Bruner, 1904 (yellow-belly boopie)
- Boopedon gracile Rehn, 1904 (prairie boopie)
- Boopedon nubilum (Say, 1825) (ebony grasshopper)
- Boopedon rufipes (Hebard, 1932)
