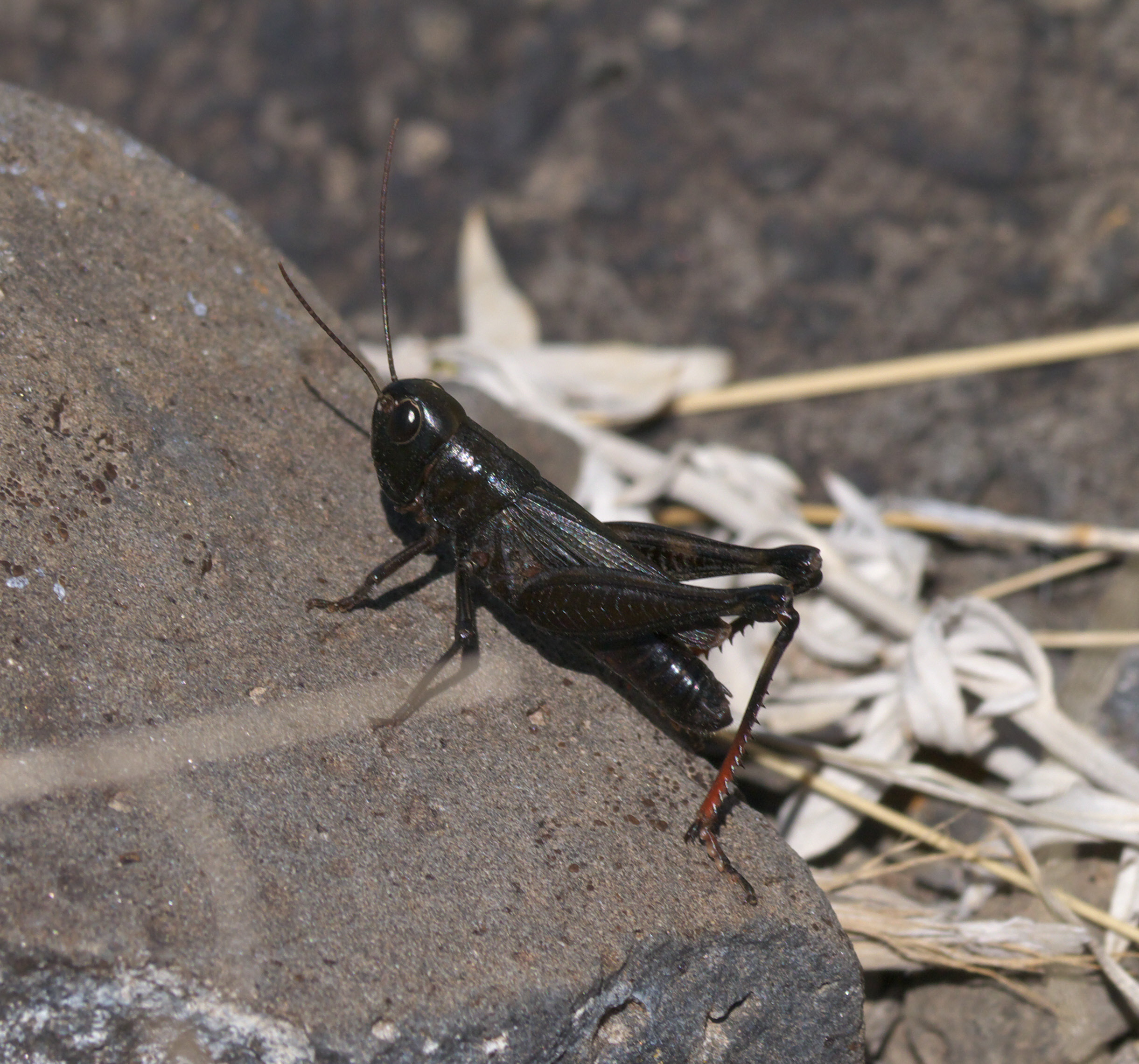

Scientific classification
- Kingdom: Animalia
- Phylum: Arthropoda
- Clade: Pancrustacea
- Class: Insecta
- Order: Orthoptera
- Suborder: Caelifera
- Family: Acrididae
- Genus: Boopedon
- Species: B. nubilum

Binomial name
- Boopedon nubilum (Say, 1825)

= Boopedon nubilum =

Species of grasshopper

Boopedon nubilum, known generally as ebony grasshopper, is a species of slant-faced grasshopper in the family Acrididae. Other common names include the black-males grasshopper and plains boopie. It is found in Central America and North America.

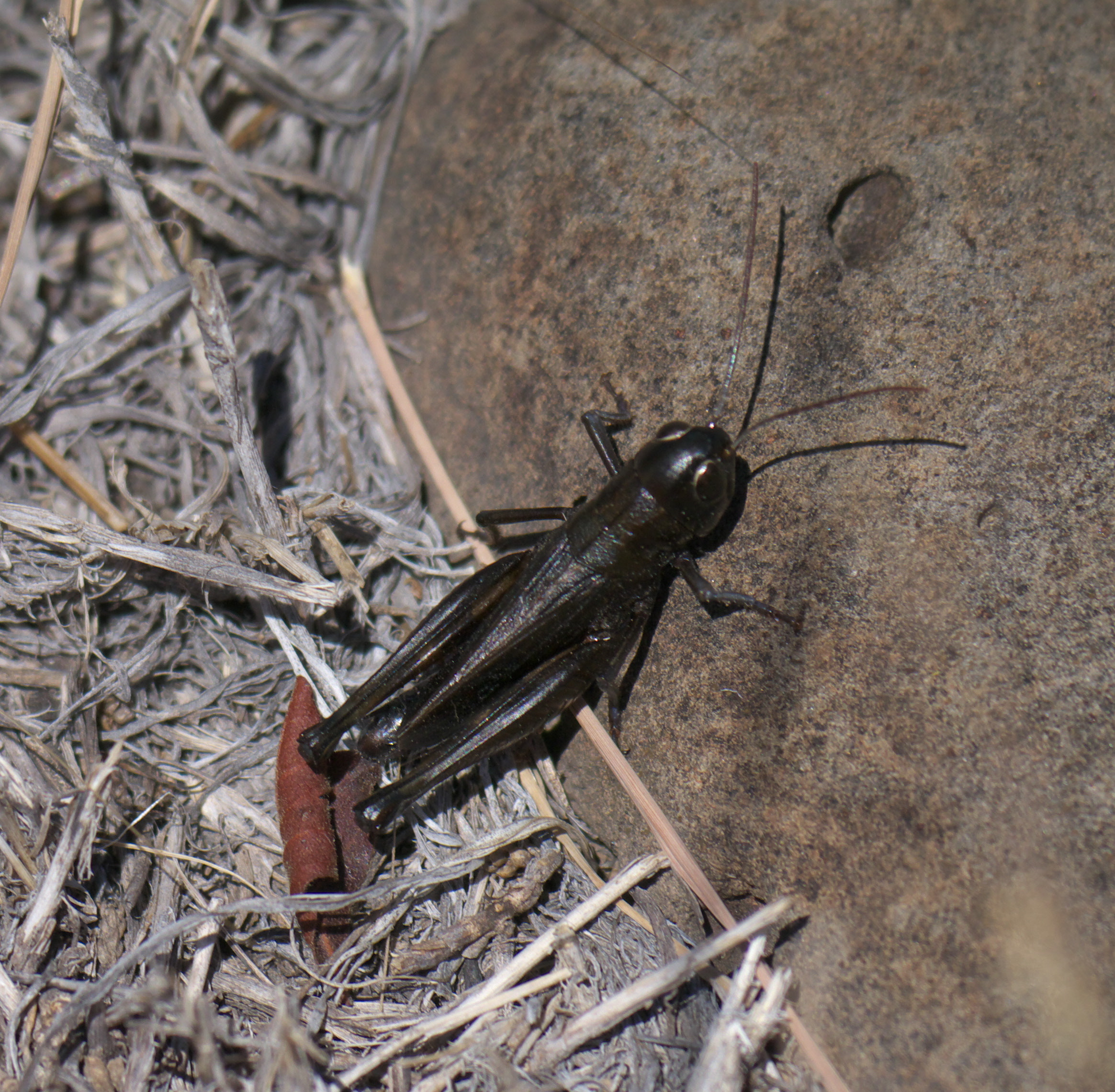
Ebony grasshopper, Boopedon nubilum

== Subspecies ==
These two subspecies belong to the species Boopedon nubilum:

- Boopedon nubilum maculatum Caudell, 1916
- Boopedon nubilum nubilum (Say, 1825)
