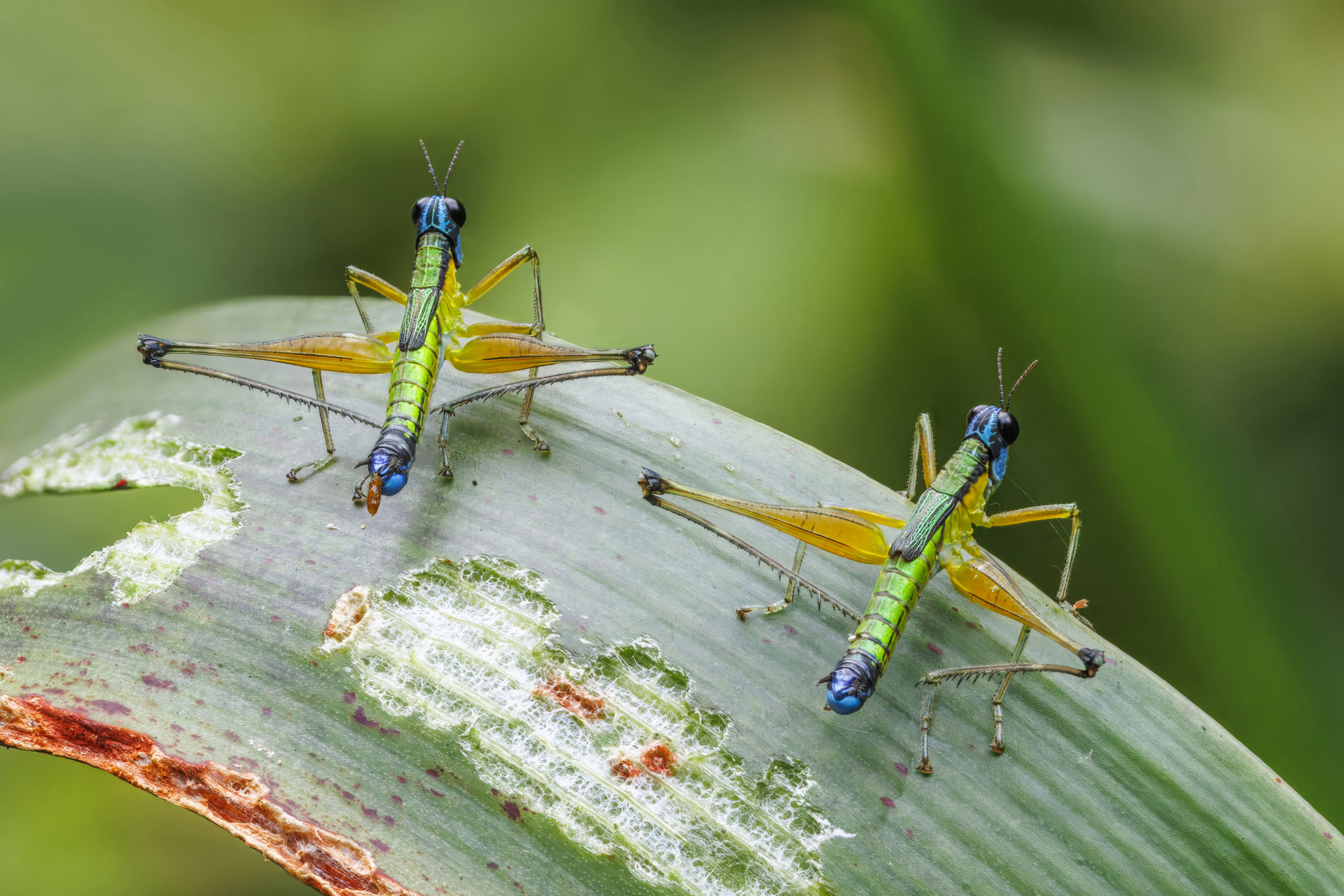
- Homeomastax sp. from Ecuador; Species cannot be determined from a photo

Scientific classification
- Kingdom: Animalia
- Phylum: Arthropoda
- Class: Insecta
- Order: Orthoptera
- Suborder: Caelifera
- Superfamily: Eumastacoidea
- Family: Eumastacidae; Burr, 1898

Subfamilies
- Eumastacinae; Gomphomastacinae; Masynteinae; Morseinae; Paramastacinae; Parepisactinae; Pseudomastacinae; Temnomastacinae

= Eumastacidae =

Family of grasshoppers

Eumastacidae are a family of grasshoppers sometimes known as monkey- or matchstick grasshoppers. They usually have thin legs that are held at right angles to the body, sometimes close to the horizontal plane. Many species are wingless. Their heads are held at an angle with the top of the head often jutting above the line of the thorax and abdomen. They have three segmented tarsi and have a short antenna with a knobby organ at the tip. They do not have a prosternal spine or tympanum. Most species inhabit the tropics, with a greater diversity in the neotropics. They are considered primitive within the Orthoptera and feed on algae, ferns, and gymnosperms, the more ancient plant groups.

The families Chorotypidae and Morabidae were formerly included in this group as subfamilies but are now considered as separate families within the Eumastacoidea. With the exception of the central Asian Gomphomastacinae, all other subfamilies are restricted to South America.

== Subfamilies and genera ==
The Orthoptera Species File lists the following:

=== Eumastacinae ===
Auth.: Burr, 1899 - central and south America

- Amedegnatomastax Cadena-Castañeda & Cardona, 2015
- Andeomastax Descamps, 1979
- Araguamastax Descamps, 1982
- Beomastax Descamps, 1979
- Caenomastax Hebard, 1923
- Cardonamastax Cadena-Castañeda, 2015
- Descampsmastax Cadena-Castañeda & Cardona, 2015
- Erythromastax Descamps, 1971
- Eumastax Burr, 1899
- Hebardomastax Cadena-Castañeda, 2016
- Helicomastax Rowell & Bentos-Pereira, 2001
- Homeomastax Descamps, 1979
- Hysteromastax Descamps, 1979
- Phryganomastax Descamps, 1982
- Santanderia Hebard, 1923
- Sciaphilomastax Descamps, 1979
- Zeromastax Porras, 2007

=== Gomphomastacinae ===
Auth.: Burr, 1899 - India, central and north-eastern Asia

- Afghanomastax Descamps, 1974
- Brachymastax Ramme, 1939
- Clinomastax Bei-Bienko, 1949
- Gomphomastax Brunner von Wattenwyl, 1898
- Gyabus Özdikmen, 2008
- Myrmeleomastax Yin, 1984
- Nepalomastax Yamasaki, 1983
- Oreomastax Bei-Bienko, 1949
- Paedomastax Bolívar, 1930
- Pentaspinula Yin, 1982
- Phytomastax Bei-Bienko, 1949
- Ptygomastax Bei-Bienko, 1959
- Sinomastax Yin, 1984

=== Masynteinae ===
Auth.: Descamps, 1973 - Cuba

- Masyntes Karsch, 1889

=== Morseinae ===
Auth.: Rehn, 1948 - Americas

- tribe Daguerreacridini Descamps, 1973
  - Daguerreacris Descamps & Liebermann, 1970
- tribe Morseini Rehn, 1948
  - Eumorsea Hebard, 1935
  - Morsea Scudder, 1898
- tribe Psychomastacini Descamps, 1973
  - Psychomastax Rehn & Hebard, 1918

=== Paramastacinae ===
Auth.: Rehn & Grant Jr., 1958 - south America

- Paramastax Burr, 1899

=== Parepisactinae ===
Auth.: Descamps, 1971 - south America

- Chapadamastax Descamps, 1979
- Parepisactus Giglio-Tos, 1898

=== Pseudomastacinae ===
Auth.: Rehn & Grant Jr., 1958 - south America

- Pseudomastax Bolívar, 1914

=== Temnomastacinae ===
Auth.: Rehn & Grant Jr., 1958 - south America

- tribe Eumastacopini Descamps, 1973
  - Arawakella Rehn & Rehn, 1942
  - Bahiamastax Descamps, 1979
  - Eumastacops Rehn & Rehn, 1942
  - Maripa Descamps & Amédégnato, 1970
  - Pareumastacops Descamps, 1979
  - Pseudeumastacops Descamps, 1974
  - Tachiramastax Descamps, 1974
- tribe Temnomastacini Rehn & Grant, 1958
  - Eutemnomastax Descamps, 1979
  - Temnomastax Rehn & Rehn, 1942

=== Incertae sedis ===
- Acutacris Dirsh, 1965 - Madagascar
- Angulomastax Zheng, 1985 - central Asia
- †Archaeomastax Sharov, 1968
- †Taphacris Cockerell, 1926
