= Acemyini =

Scientific classification
- Domain: Eukaryota
- Kingdom: Animalia
- Phylum: Arthropoda
- Class: Insecta
- Order: Diptera
- Family: Tachinidae
- Subfamily: Exoristinae
- Tribe: Acemyini; Brauer & von Bergenstamm, 1889

Tribe of flies

Acemyini is a small but cosmopolitan tribe of flies in the family Tachinidae. Like all tachinid flies, acemyiines are parasitoids of other invertebrates. Specifically, the acemyiines are parasitoids of Orthoptera in the families Acrididae and Eumastacidae.

== Identification ==
The Acemyiini have a distinctive pattern of scutellar bristling among the Tachinidae, comprising three pairs of very strong setae; one pair of crossed apical setae, a diverging subapical pair set unusually far forwards, and a basal pair which may be approximately parallel or converging. Most species have a long series of proclinate orbital setae in both sexes. The basal node of vein R4+5 in acemyiines has one pair of very long setulae - one on each surface of the wing - which is uncommon in the Goniinae.

== Genera ==
- Acemya Robineau-Desvoidy, 1830
- Atlantomyia Crosskey, 1977
- Ceracia Rondani, 1865
- Charitella Mesnil, 1957
- Eoacemyia Townsend, 1926
- Hygiella Mesnil, 1957
- Metacemyia Herting, 1969
