= Nemorilla pyste =

Scientific classification
- Kingdom: Animalia
- Phylum: Arthropoda
- Class: Insecta
- Order: Diptera
- Family: Tachinidae
- Subfamily: Exoristinae
- Tribe: Winthemiini
- Genus: Nemorilla
- Species: N. pyste

Binomial name
- Nemorilla pyste (Walker, 1849)

Synonyms
- Exorista scudderi Williston, 1889; Tachina phycitae LeBaron, 1872; Tachina pyste Walker, 1849

Species of fly

Nemorilla pyste is a species of fly in the family Tachinidae. It lays its eggs in the head or thorax of Acrobasis indigenella larvae.

== Distribution ==
Canada, United States, Virgin Islands, Trinidad and Tobago, Mexico
