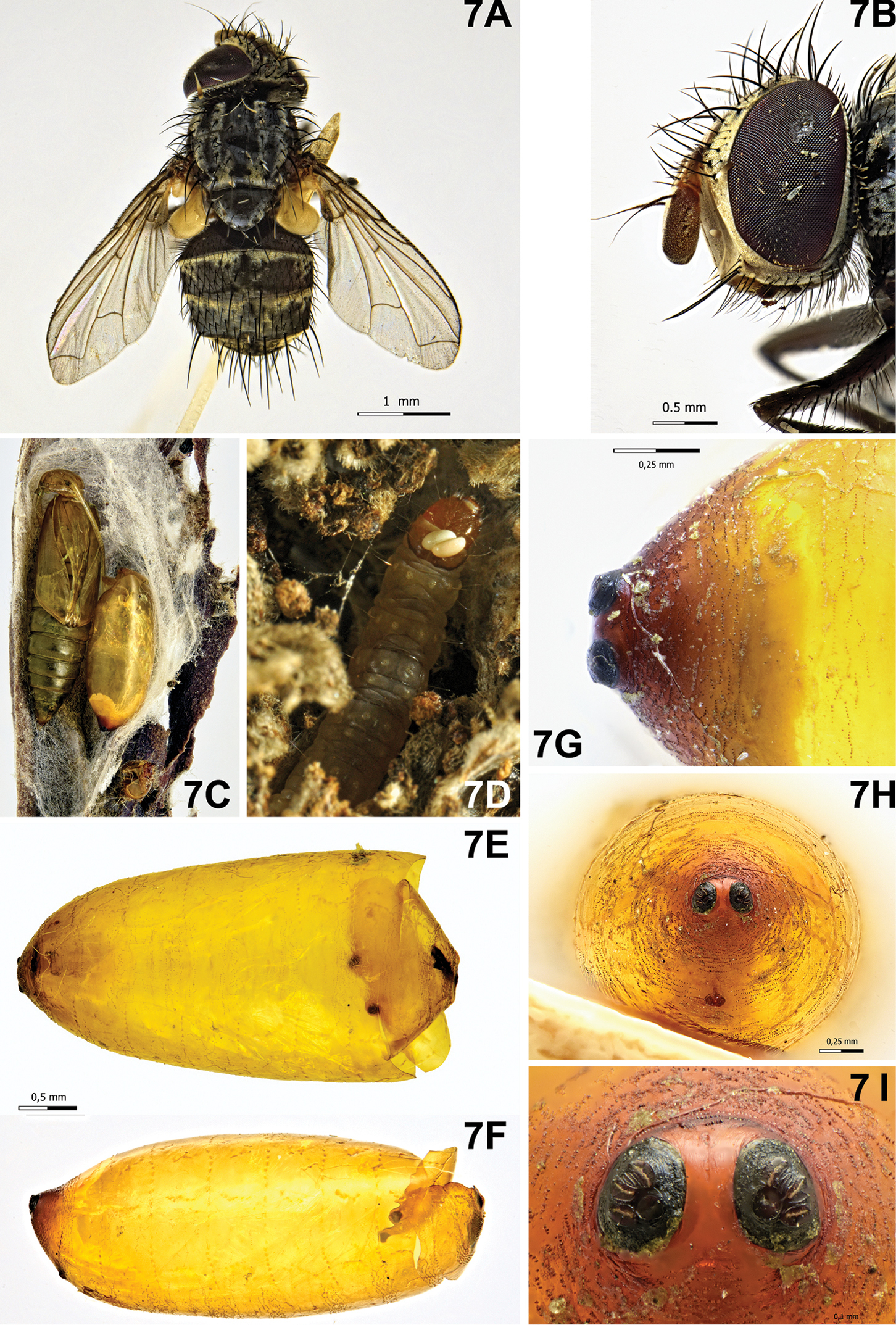

Scientific classification
- Kingdom: Animalia
- Phylum: Arthropoda
- Class: Insecta
- Order: Diptera
- Family: Tachinidae
- Subfamily: Exoristinae
- Tribe: Winthemiini
- Genus: Nemorilla
- Species: N. maculosa

Binomial name
- Nemorilla maculosa (Meigen, 1824)

Synonyms
- Aubaea cita Robineau-Desvoidy, 1863; Aubaea minuta Robineau-Desvoidy, 1863; Exorista notata Macquart, 1850; Exorista pusilla Macquart, 1850; Nemorilla aristalis Rondani, 1859; Tachina maculosa Meigen, 1824; Tachina rubicornis Zetterstedt, 1844

= Nemorilla maculosa =

Species of fly

Nemorilla maculosa is a species of fly in the family Tachinidae.

== Distribution ==
Turkmenistan, Uzbekistan, Czech Republic, Hungary, Poland, Romania, Slovakia, Ukraine, Denmark, Finland, Norway, Sweden, Andorra, Bosnia and Herzegovina, Bulgaria, Corse, Croatia, Greece, Italy, Malta, Portugal, Serbia, Slovenia, Spain, Turkey, Austria, Belgium, France, Germany, Netherlands, Switzerland, Japan, South Korea, Afghanistan, Iran, Israel, Mongolia, Canary Islands, Morocco, Tunisia, Russia, Azerbaijan, China, India, Japan, Myanmar, Taiwan.
