= Winthemia erythrura =

Scientific classification
- Kingdom: Animalia
- Phylum: Arthropoda
- Class: Insecta
- Order: Diptera
- Family: Tachinidae
- Subfamily: Exoristinae
- Tribe: Winthemiini
- Genus: Winthemia
- Species: W. erythrura

Binomial name
- Winthemia erythrura (Meigen, 1838)

Synonyms
- Eversmania ruficauda Robineau-Desvoidy, 1863; Nemorea erythrura Meigen, 1838

Species of fly

Winthemia erythrura is a species of fly in the family Tachinidae.

== Distribution ==
Czech Republic, Hungary, Latvia, Lithuania, Poland, Romania, Slovakia, Denmark, Finland, Norway, Sweden, Bulgaria, Italy, Serbia, Slovenia, Austria, Belgium, France, Germany, Netherlands, Switzerland, Russia.
