= Smidtia amoena =

Scientific classification
- Kingdom: Animalia
- Phylum: Arthropoda
- Class: Insecta
- Order: Diptera
- Family: Tachinidae
- Subfamily: Exoristinae
- Tribe: Winthemiini
- Genus: Smidtia
- Species: S. amoena

Binomial name
- Smidtia amoena (Meigen, 1824)

Synonyms
- Chetolyga pilifera Rondani, 1859; Smidtia flavipalpis Robineau-Desvoidy, 1848; Tachina amoena Meigen, 1824; Tachina certans Walker, 1853; Tachina delitescens Walker, 1853

Species of fly

Smidtia amoena is a species of fly in the family Tachinidae.

== Distribution ==
Tajikistan, British Isles, Belarus, Czech Republic, Hungary, Latvia, Moldova, Poland, Romania, Slovakia, Ukraine, Denmark, Finland, Norway, Sweden, Andorra, Bulgaria, Croatia, Greece, Italy, Serbia, Spain, Turkey, Austria, Belgium, France, Germany, Netherlands, Switzerland, Japan, Kazakhstan, South Korea, Iran, Russia, Transcaucasia, China.
