= Winthemia bohemani =

Scientific classification
- Kingdom: Animalia
- Phylum: Arthropoda
- Class: Insecta
- Order: Diptera
- Family: Tachinidae
- Subfamily: Exoristinae
- Tribe: Winthemiini
- Genus: Winthemia
- Species: W. bohemani

Binomial name
- Winthemia bohemani (Zetterstedt, 1844)

Synonyms
- Tachina bohemani Zetterstedt, 1844

Species of fly

Winthemia bohemani is a species of fly in the family Tachinidae.

== Distribution ==
Czech Republic, Hungary, Poland, Romania, Slovakia, Ukraine, Denmark, Norway, Sweden, Italy, Austria, France, Germany, Netherlands, Switzerland, Kazakhstan, Russia.
