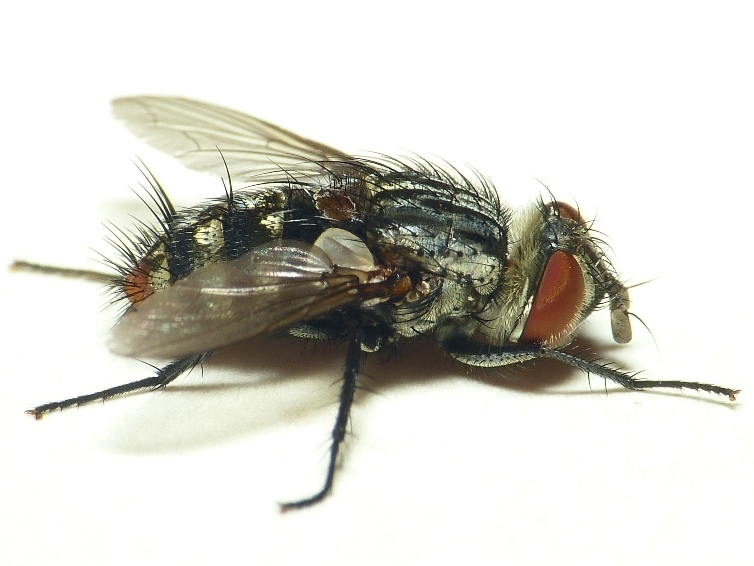

Scientific classification
- Kingdom: Animalia
- Phylum: Arthropoda
- Class: Insecta
- Order: Diptera
- Family: Tachinidae
- Subfamily: Exoristinae
- Tribe: Winthemiini
- Genus: Winthemia
- Species: W. quadripustulata

Binomial name
- Winthemia quadripustulata (Fabricius, 1794)

Synonyms
- Arge terminalis Robineau-Desvoidy, 1863; Chetolyga cilicrura Rondani, 1859; Dorbinia ludibunda Robineau-Desvoidy, 1847; Exorista sanguinolenta Macquart, 1850; Nemoraea analis Macquart, 1848; Tachina aestuans Fallén, 1810

= Winthemia quadripustulata =

Species of fly

Winthemia quadripustulata is a species of fly in the family Tachinidae.

== Distribution ==
Canada, United States, Kyrgyzstan, British Isles, Czech Republic, Estonia, Hungary, Latvia, Moldova, Poland, Romania, Slovakia, Ukraine, Denmark, Finland, Norway, Sweden, Andorra, Bosnia and Herzegovina, Bulgaria, Croatia, Greece, Italy, Serbia, Slovenia, Spain, Turkey, Yugoslavia, Austria, Belgium, France, Germany, Netherlands, Switzerland, Mongolia, Russia, Transcaucasia, China.
