= Smidtia conspersa =

Scientific classification
- Kingdom: Animalia
- Phylum: Arthropoda
- Class: Insecta
- Order: Diptera
- Family: Tachinidae
- Subfamily: Exoristinae
- Tribe: Winthemiini
- Genus: Smidtia
- Species: S. conspersa

Binomial name
- Smidtia conspersa (Meigen, 1824)

Synonyms
- Chetolyga separata Rondani, 1859; Erigone barbicultrix Pandellé, 1896; Megalochaeta eggeri Brauer & von Berganstamm, 1889; Smidtia cupraea Robineau-Desvoidy, 1848; Smidtia myoidea Robineau-Desvoidy, 1830; Smidtia nitida Robineau-Desvoidy, 1863; Smidtia vernalis Robineau-Desvoidy, 1830; Tachina ambulans Meigen, 1824; Tachina conspersa Meigen, 1824

Species of fly

Smidtia conspersa is a species of fly in the family Tachinidae.

== Distribution ==
Tajikistan, British Isles, Belarus, Czech Republic, Hungary, Latvia, Moldova, Poland, Romania, Slovakia, Ukraine, Denmark, Finland, Norway, Sweden, Andorra, Bulgaria, Croatia, Greece, Italy, Serbia, Spain, Turkey, Austria, Belgium, France, Germany, Netherlands, Switzerland, Japan, Kazakhstan, South Korea, Iran, Russia, Transcaucasia, China.
