= Winthemia cruentata =

Scientific classification
- Kingdom: Animalia
- Phylum: Arthropoda
- Class: Insecta
- Order: Diptera
- Family: Tachinidae
- Subfamily: Exoristinae
- Tribe: Winthemiini
- Genus: Winthemia
- Species: W. cruentata

Binomial name
- Winthemia cruentata (Rondani, 1859)

Synonyms
- Chetolyga cruentata Rondani, 1859

Species of fly

Winthemia cruentata is a species of fly in the family Tachinidae. It is a parasitoid of Sphinx ligustri.

== Distribution ==
British Isles, Czech Republic, Hungary, Lithuania, Moldova, Poland, Romania, Slovakia, Denmark, Sweden, Bulgaria, Greece, Italy, Turkey, Austria, Belgium, France, Germany, Netherlands, Switzerland, Japan, South Korea, Mongolia, Russia, Transcaucasia.
