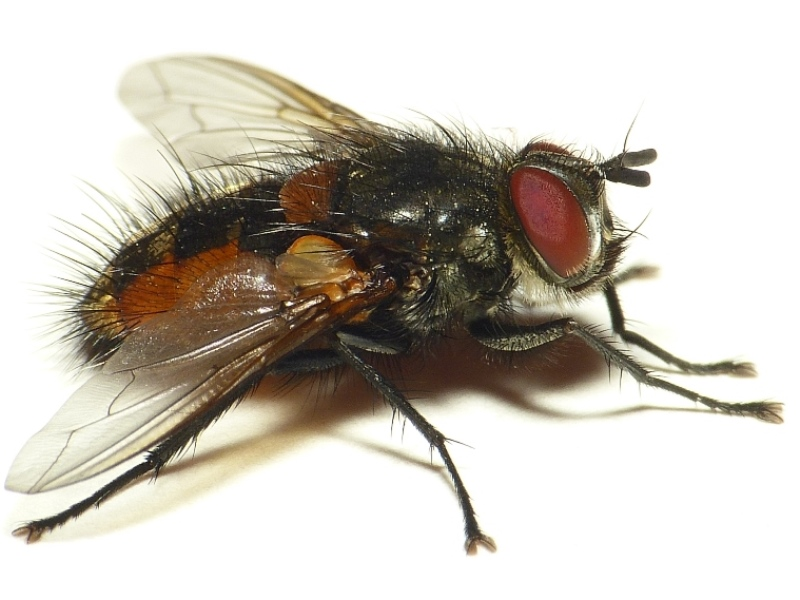
- Winthemia variegata

Scientific classification
- Kingdom: Animalia
- Phylum: Arthropoda
- Clade: Pancrustacea
- Class: Insecta
- Order: Diptera
- Family: Tachinidae
- Subfamily: Exoristinae
- Tribe: Winthemiini
- Genus: Winthemia; Robineau-Desvoidy, 1830

Type species
- Musca quadripustulata Fabricius, 1794

Synonyms
- Arge Robineau-Desvoidy, 1863; Bicruciosturmia Townsend, 1932; Catanemorilla Villeneuve, 1910; Crossotocnema Bigot, 1885; Dorbinia Robineau-Desvoidy, 1847; Eversmania Robineau-Desvoidy, 1863; Eversmannia Bezzi & Stein, 1907; Eversmannia Marschall, 1873; Hemimasipoda Townsend, 1927; Homotoma Bezzi, 1907; Microtrichodes Macquart, 1846; Okeopsis Townsend, 1927; Promasipoda Townsend, 1934; Prowinthemia Townsend, 1928; Pseudokea Townsend, 1928; Sericophoromyia Austen, 1909; Sericophoromyiops Townsend, 1933; Winthemiola Mesnil, 1949; Winthemiopsis Blanchard, 1963; Winthemya Rondani, 1859; Winthemyia Pantel, 1909

= Winthemia =

Genus of flies

Winthemia is a genus of flies in the family Tachinidae.

== Species ==
- Winthemia abdominalis (Townsend, 1919)
- Winthemia alabamae (Townsend, 1940)
- Winthemia amplipilosa (Curran, 1928)
- Winthemia analis (Macquart, 1846)
- Winthemia analiselia Thompson, 1963
- Winthemia andersoni Guimarães, 1972
- Winthemia angusta Coelho, Carvalho & Guimarães, 1989
- Winthemia aquilonalis Chao, 1998
- Winthemia aurea Shima, Chao & Zhiang, 1992
- Winthemia aureonigra Thompson, 1963
- Winthemia aurifrons Guimarães, 1972
- Winthemia australis Mesnil, 1949
- Winthemia authentica Coelho, Carvalho & Guimarães, 1989
- Winthemia beijingensis Chao, 1998
- Winthemia bicrucis (Townsend, 1932)
- Winthemia bohemani (Zetterstedt, 1844)
- Winthemia borealis Reinhard, 1931
- Winthemia brasiliensis (Townsend, 1927)
- Winthemia brevicornis Shima, Chao & Zhiang, 1992
- Winthemia brevipennis Shima, 1996
- Winthemia caledoniae Mesnil, 1969
- Winthemia candida Mesnil, 1977
- Winthemia cecropia (Riley, 1870)
- Winthemia ciligera Robineau-Desvoidy, 1830
- Winthemia citheroniae Sabrosky, 1948
- Winthemia claripilosa (Austen, 1909)
- Winthemia communis Thompson, 1963
- Winthemia conformis (Curran, 1928)
- Winthemia consobrina (Wulp, 1890)
- Winthemia cruentata (Rondani, 1859)
- Winthemia cuyana (Blanchard, 1963)
- Winthemia cylindrica (Villeneuve, 1938)
- Winthemia dasyops (Wiedemann, 1824)
- Winthemia datanae (Townsend, 1892)
- Winthemia deilephilae (Osten Sacken, 1887)
- Winthemia diversitica Chao, 1998
- Winthemia diversoides Baranov, 1932
- Winthemia dubiosa Thompson, 1963
- Winthemia duplicata Reinhard, 1931
- Winthemia elegans (Bigot, 1857)
- Winthemia emeiensis Chao & Liang, 1998
- Winthemia erythropyga (Bigot, 1889)
- Winthemia erythrura (Meigen, 1838)
- Winthemia fasciculata Villeneuve, 1921
- Winthemia floridensis Guimarães, 1972
- Winthemia fumiferanae Tothill, 1912
- Winthemia geminata (Brauer & von Berganstamm, 1889)
- Winthemia grioti (Blanchard, 1963)
- Winthemia hokkaidensis Baranov, 1939
- Winthemia ignicornis Mesnil, 1977
- Winthemia ikezakii Shima, 1996
- Winthemia imitator Reinhard, 1931
- Winthemia infesta (Williston, 1885)
- Winthemia intermedia Reinhard, 1931
- Winthemia intonsa Reinhard, 1931
- Winthemia jacentkovskyi Mesnil, 1949
- Winthemia javana (Bigot, 1885)
- Winthemia lateralis (Macquart, 1844)
- Winthemia latimanus (Wulp, 1890)
- Winthemia leucanae (Kirkpatrick, 1861)
- Winthemia madecassa Mesnil, 1949
- Winthemia mallochi Baranov, 1932
- Winthemia manducae Sabrosky & DeLoach, 1970
- Winthemia marginalis Shima, Chao & Zhiang, 1992
- Winthemia masicerana (Villeneuve, 1937)
- Winthemia mediocris Shima, 1996
- Winthemia militaris (Walsh, 1861)
- Winthemia mima Reinhard, 1931
- Winthemia miyatakei Shima, 1996
- Winthemia montana Reinhard, 1931
- Winthemia neowinthemioides (Townsend, 1928)
- Winthemia novaguinea Cantrell, 1989
- Winthemia obscurella (Wulp, 1890)
- Winthemia occidentis Reinhard, 1931
- Winthemia okefenokeensis Smith, 1916
- Winthemia ostensackenii (Kirkpatrick, 1861)
- Winthemia pacifica Malloch, 1935
- Winthemia palpalis (Townsend, 1927)
- Winthemia pandurata Coelho, Carvalho & Guimarães, 1989
- Winthemia papuana Mesnil, 1969
- Winthemia parafacialis Chao & Liang, 1998
- Winthemia paraguayensis (Townsend, 1928)
- Winthemia parallela Chao & Liang, 1998
- Winthemia patagonica (Blanchard, 1963)
- Winthemia peruviana (Townsend, 1928)
- Winthemia pilosa (Villeneuve, 1910)
- Winthemia pinguioides (Townsend, 1934)
- Winthemia pinguis (Fabricius, 1805)
- Winthemia polita Reinhard, 1931
- Winthemia pollinosa Thompson, 1963
- Winthemia proclinata Shima, Chao & Zhiang, 1992
- Winthemia pyrrhopyga (Wiedemann, 1819)
- Winthemia quadrata (Wiedemann, 1830)
- Winthemia quadripustulata (Fabricius, 1794)
- Winthemia queenslandica Cantrell, 1989
- Winthemia reinhardi Guimarães, 1972
- Winthemia reliqua Cortés & Campos, 1971
- Winthemia remittens (Walker, 1859)
- Winthemia rifiventris (Macquart, 1850)
- Winthemia roblesi Valencia, 1972
- Winthemia rubra Vimmer & Soukup, 1940
- Winthemia rubricornis (Wulp, 1890)
- Winthemia ruficornis (Blanchard, 1942)
- Winthemia ruficrura (Villeneuve, 1916)
- Winthemia rufilatera (Rondani, 1850)
- Winthemia rufonotata (Bigot, 1889)
- Winthemia rufopicta (Bigot, 1889)
- Winthemia sexualis Curran, 1927
- Winthemia shimai Chao, 1998
- Winthemia singularis Reinhard, 1931
- Winthemia sinuata Reinhard, 1931
- Winthemia solomonica Baranov, 1938
- Winthemia sororcula (Wulp, 1890)
- Winthemia speciosa (Egger, 1861)
- Winthemia subpicea (Walker, 1853)
- Winthemia sumatrana (Townsend, 1927)
- Winthemia terrosa Villeneuve, 1913
- Winthemia tessellata (Wulp, 1890)
- Winthemia texana Reinhard, 1931
- Winthemia trichopareia (Schiner, 1868)
- Winthemia tricolor (Wulp, 1890)
- Winthemia trinitatis Thompson, 1963
- Winthemia venusta (Meigen, 1824)
- Winthemia venustoides Mesnil, 1967
- Winthemia verticillata Shima, Chao & Zhiang, 1992
- Winthemia vesiculata (Townsend, 1916)
- Winthemia xanthocera (Wiedemann, 1830)
- Winthemia zhoui Chao, 1998
