= Hemisturmia =

Scientific classification
- Kingdom: Animalia
- Phylum: Arthropoda
- Class: Insecta
- Order: Diptera
- Family: Tachinidae
- Subfamily: Exoristinae
- Tribe: Winthemiini
- Genus: Hemisturmia; Townsend, 1927

Type species
- Hemisturmia carcelioides Townsend, 1927

Synonyms
- Pseudolomyia Reinhard, 1962

Genus of flies

Hemisturmia is a genus of flies in the family Tachinidae.

== Species ==
- Hemisturmia americana (Curran, 1927)
- Hemisturmia brasiliensis Guimarães, 1983
- Hemisturmia carcelioides Townsend, 1927
- Hemisturmia flavipalpis Guimarães, 1983
- Hemisturmia parva (Bigot, 1889)
- Hemisturmia scissilis (Reinhard, 1962)
- Hemisturmia tortricis (Coquillett, 1897)
