= Avibrissosturmia =

Scientific classification
- Kingdom: Animalia
- Phylum: Arthropoda
- Class: Insecta
- Order: Diptera
- Family: Tachinidae
- Subfamily: Exoristinae
- Tribe: Winthemiini
- Genus: Avibrissosturmia; Townsend, 1927

Type species
- Avibrissosturmia avida Townsend, 1927

Synonyms
- Pelixia Curran, 1934

Genus of flies

Avibrissosturmia is a genus of flies in the family Tachinidae.

== Species ==
- Avibrissosturmia avida Townsend, 1927
- Avibrissosturmia lanei Guimarães, 1983
- Avibrissosturmia lopesi Guimarães, 1983
- Avibrissosturmia nigra Guimarães, 1983
- Avibrissosturmia nigriventris (Bigot, 1889)
- Avibrissosturmia nitidiventris (Bigot, 1889)
- Avibrissosturmia plaumanni Guimarães, 1983
- Avibrissosturmia vexans (Curran, 1934)
