= Triodontopyga =

Scientific classification
- Kingdom: Animalia
- Phylum: Arthropoda
- Class: Insecta
- Order: Diptera
- Family: Tachinidae
- Subfamily: Exoristinae
- Tribe: Winthemiini
- Genus: Triodontopyga; Townsend, 1927

Type species
- Triodontopyga tridens Townsend, 1927

Genus of flies

Triodontopyga is a genus of flies in the family Tachinidae.

== Species ==
- Triodontopyga flavolimbata (Bigot, 1889)
- Triodontopyga friburguensis Guimarães, 1983
- Triodontopyga lenkoi Guimarães, 1983
- Triodontopyga montei Guimarães, 1983
- Triodontopyga obscurata Guimarães, 1983
- Triodontopyga tridens Townsend, 1927
- Triodontopyga trinitatis Thompson, 1963
- Triodontopyga vibrissata Guimarães, 1983
- Triodontopyga vorax (Wiedemann, 1830)
