= Rhaphiochaeta =

Scientific classification
- Kingdom: Animalia
- Phylum: Arthropoda
- Class: Insecta
- Order: Diptera
- Family: Tachinidae
- Subfamily: Exoristinae
- Tribe: Winthemiini
- Genus: Rhaphiochaeta; Brauer & von Berganstamm, 1889

Type species
- Tachina breviseta Zetterstedt, 1838

Synonyms
- Mimomeriania Zimin, 1960

Genus of flies

Rhaphiochaeta is a genus of flies in the family Tachinidae.

== Species ==
- Rhaphiochaeta breviseta (Zetterstedt, 1838)

== Distribution ==
British Isles, Czech Republic, Hungary, Poland, Slovakia, Ukraine, Denmark, Finland, Norway, Sweden, Serbia, Austria, Belgium, Germany, Netherlands, Russia, Transcaucasia.
