= Orasturmia =

Scientific classification
- Kingdom: Animalia
- Phylum: Arthropoda
- Class: Insecta
- Order: Diptera
- Family: Tachinidae
- Subfamily: Exoristinae
- Tribe: Winthemiini
- Genus: Orasturmia; Reinhard, 1947

Type species
- Orasturmia vallicola Reinhard, 1947

Synonyms
- Angustiopsis Reinhard, 1959

Genus of flies

Orasturmia is a genus of flies in the family Tachinidae.

== Species ==
- Orasturmia vallicola Reinhard, 1947

== Distribution ==
United States.
