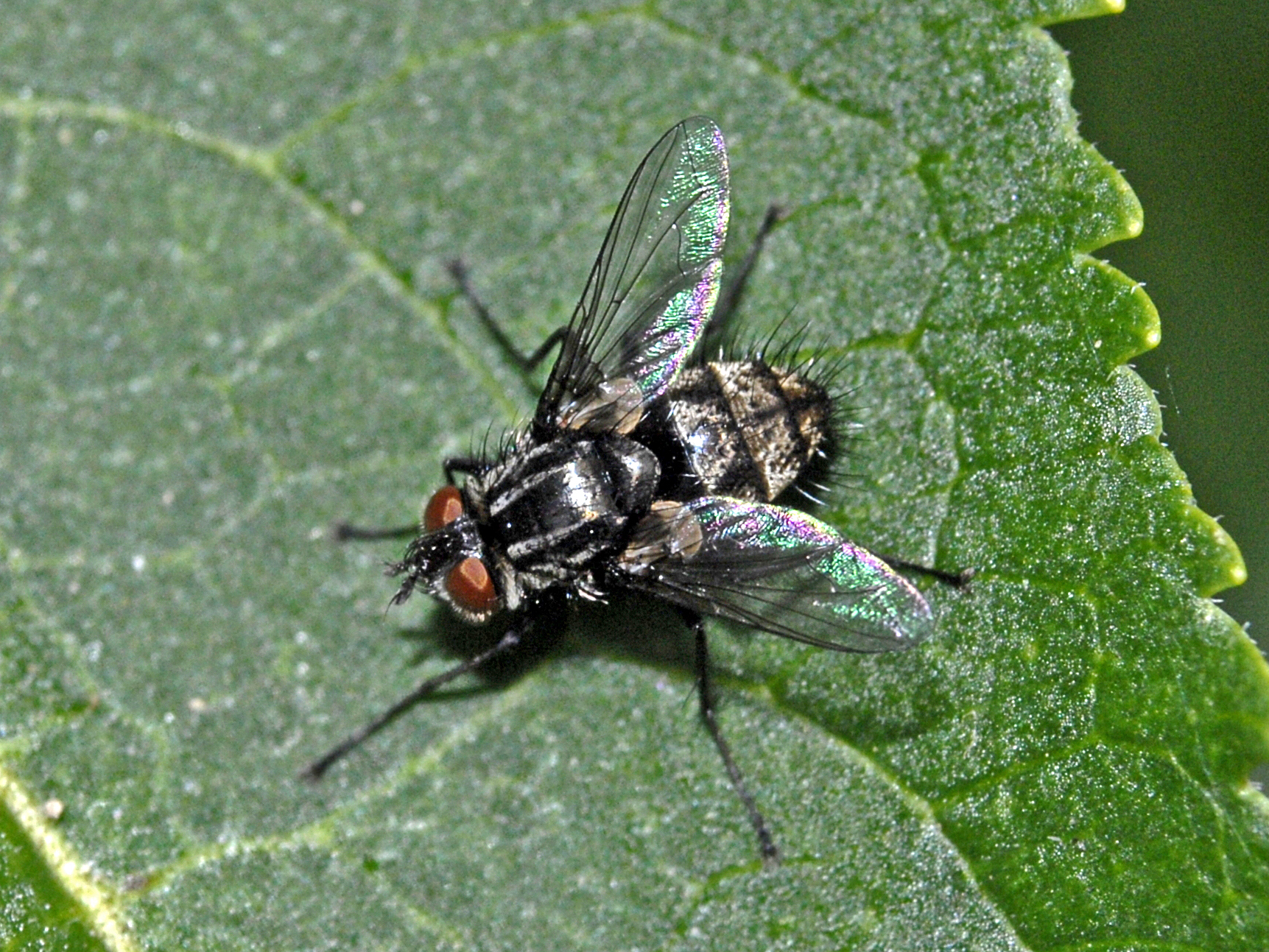
- Nemorilla floralis

Scientific classification
- Kingdom: Animalia
- Phylum: Arthropoda
- Class: Insecta
- Order: Diptera
- Family: Tachinidae
- Subfamily: Exoristinae
- Tribe: Winthemiini
- Genus: Nemorilla
- Species: N. floralis

Binomial name
- Nemorilla floralis (Fallén, 1810)

Synonyms
- Aubaea aurulenta Robineau-Desvoidy, 1863; Aubaea campestris Robineau-Desvoidy, 1863; Exorista arrogans Macquart, 1850; Exorista laticella Macquart, 1850; Nemorilla amica Rondani, 1859; Pitthaea nebulosa Robineau-Desvoidy, 1863; Tachina angustipennis Meigen, 1824; Tachina floralis Fallén, 1810; Tachina intersita Walker, 1853; Tachina notabilis Meigen, 1824; Tachina pabulina Meigen, 1824

= Nemorilla floralis =

Species of fly

Nemorilla floralis is a species of tachinid fly.

== Description ==
Thorax shows a few black stripes, with a broader central stripe. Head and body are hairy. Body color ranges from pale grey or beige to black. The abdomen is speckled. Wings are partially darkened.

Adults can be found from May to July. These flies lay their eggs inside a living host where larvae develop.

== Hosts ==
This species is a parasitoid of various butterflies and micro-moths (Arctiidae, Noctuidae, Choreutidae, Nymphalidae, Oecophoridae and Pyralidae).

== Distribution ==
Turkmenistan, Uzbekistan, Czech Republic, Hungary, Poland, Romania, Slovakia, Ukraine, Denmark, Finland, Norway, Sweden, Andorra, Bosnia and Herzegovina, Bulgaria, Corse, Croatia, Greece, Italy, Malta, Portugal, Serbia, Slovenia, Spain, Turkey, Austria, Belgium, France, Germany, Netherlands, Switzerland, Japan, South Korea, Afghanistan, Iran, Israel, Mongolia, Canary Islands, Morocco, Tunisia, Russia, Azerbaijan, China, India, Japan, Myanmar, Taiwan.
