= Fasslomyia =

Scientific classification
- Kingdom: Animalia
- Phylum: Arthropoda
- Class: Insecta
- Order: Diptera
- Family: Tachinidae
- Subfamily: Exoristinae
- Tribe: Winthemiini
- Genus: Fasslomyia; Townsend, 1931

Type species
- Fasslomyia fantastica Townsend, 1931

Genus of flies

Fasslomyia is a genus of flies in the family Tachinidae.

== Species ==
- Fasslomyia fantastica Townsend, 1931

== Distribution ==
Bolivia.
