= Euwinthemia =

Scientific classification
- Kingdom: Animalia
- Phylum: Arthropoda
- Class: Insecta
- Order: Diptera
- Family: Tachinidae
- Subfamily: Exoristinae
- Tribe: Winthemiini
- Genus: Euwinthemia; Blanchard, 1963

Type species
- Pronemorilla breibohmi Blanchard, 1942

Genus of flies

Euwinthemia is a genus of flies in the family Tachinidae.

== Species ==
- Euwinthemia kreibohmi (Blanchard, 1942)

== Distribution ==
Argentina.
