= Smidtia =

Scientific classification
- Kingdom: Animalia
- Phylum: Arthropoda
- Class: Insecta
- Order: Diptera
- Family: Tachinidae
- Subfamily: Exoristinae
- Tribe: Winthemiini
- Genus: Smidtia; Robineau-Desvoidy, 1830

Type species
- Smidtia vernalis Robineau-Desvoidy, 1830

Synonyms
- Megalochaeta Brauer & von Berganstamm, 1889; Timavia Robineau-Desvoidy, 1863

Genus of flies

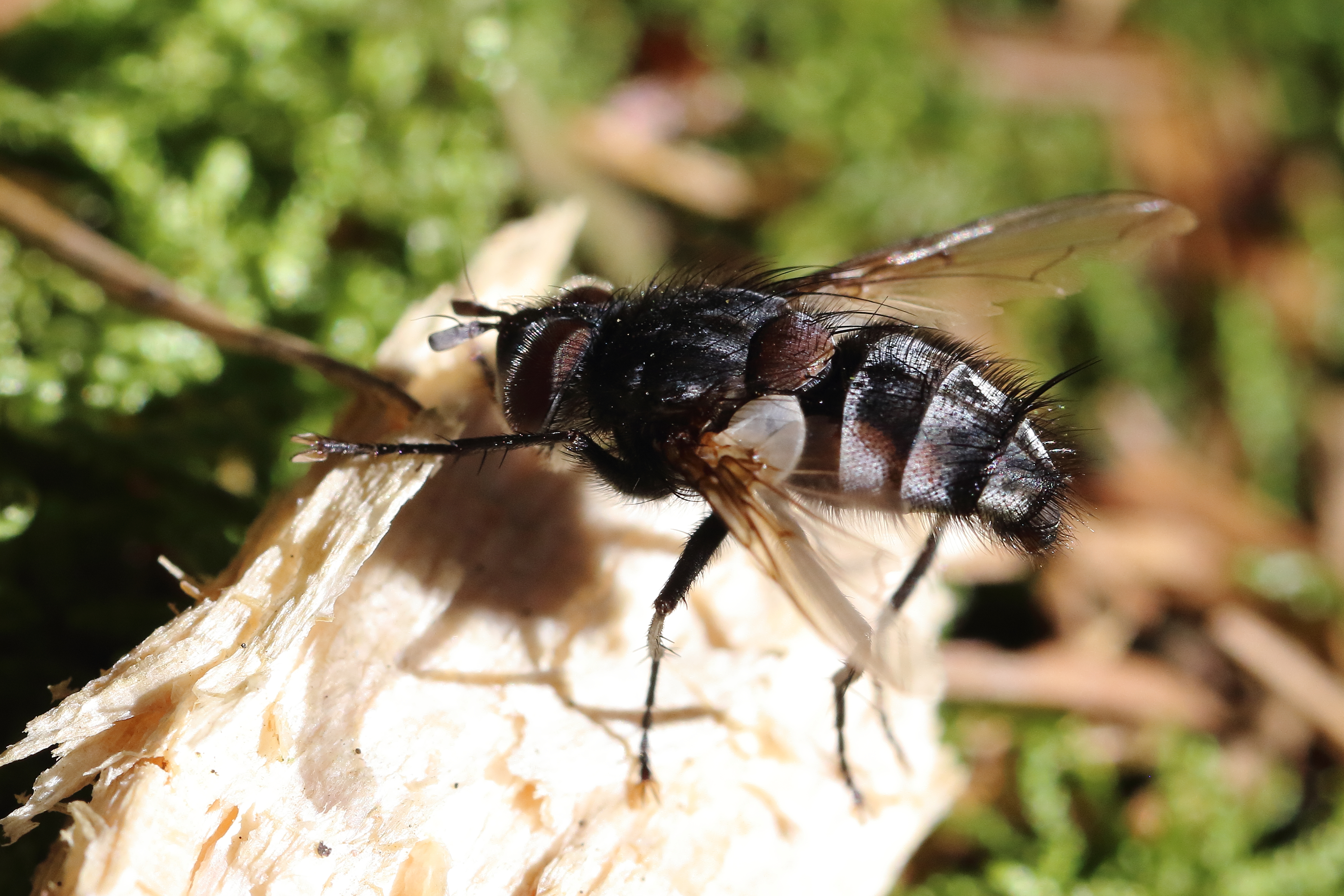
Raupenfliegen Tachinidae

Smidtia is a genus of flies in the family Tachinidae.

== Species ==
- Smidtia amoena (Meigen, 1824)
- Smidtia amurensis (Borisova, 1962)
- Smidtia antennalis Shima, 1996
- Smidtia candida Chao & Liang, 2003
- Smidtia capensis (Schiner, 1868)
- Smidtia conspersa (Meigen, 1824)
- Smidtia fukushii Shima, 1996
- Smidtia gemina (Mesnil, 1949)
- Smidtia harai Shima, 1996
- Smidtia japonica (Mesnil, 1957)
- Smidtia laeta (Mesnil, 1963)
- Smidtia laticauda (Mesnil, 1963)
- Smidtia latifrons (Richter, 1972)
- Smidtia longicauda Chao & Liang, 2003
- Smidtia longicercus Liang & Zhang, 2018
- Smidtia magnicornis Mesnil, 1967
- Smidtia orientalis (Borisova, 1962)
- Smidtia pauciseta Shima, 1996
- Smidtia trisetosa Shima, 1996
- Smidtia verna Kocha, 1971
- Smidtia winthemioides (Mesnil, 1949)
- Smidtia yichunensis Chao & Liang, 2003
- Smidtia zimini (Mesnil, 1963)
