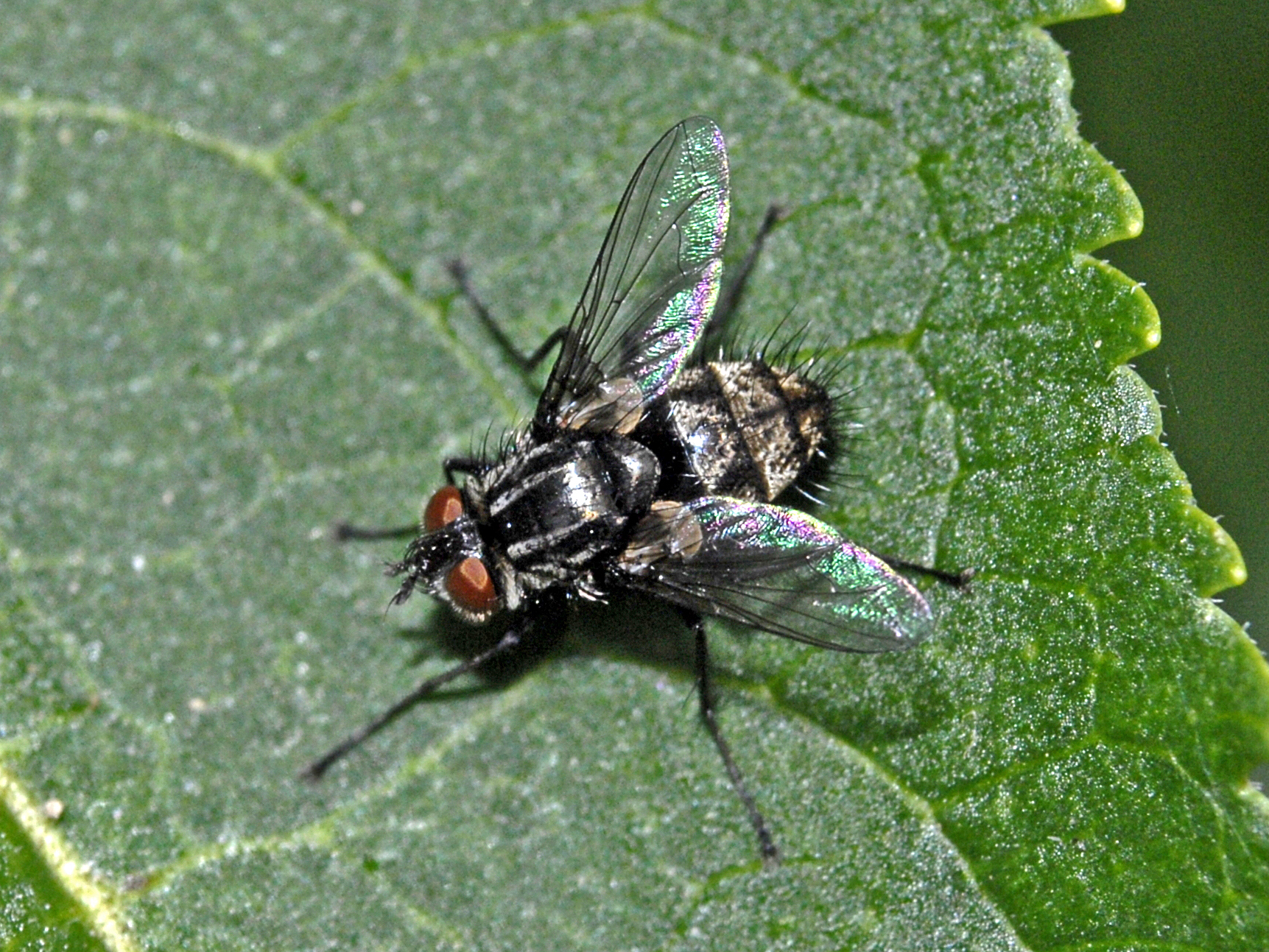
- Nemorilla floralis

Scientific classification
- Kingdom: Animalia
- Phylum: Arthropoda
- Clade: Pancrustacea
- Class: Insecta
- Order: Diptera
- Family: Tachinidae
- Subfamily: Exoristinae
- Tribe: Winthemiini
- Genus: Nemorilla; Rondani, 1856

Type species
- Tachina maculosa Meigen, 1824

Synonyms
- Aubaea Robineau-Desvoidy, 1863; Memorilla Murray, Kriegel, Johnson & Howitt, 1996; Pitthaea Robineau-Desvoidy, 1863; Thyella Robineau-Desvoidy, 1863; Tinanemorilla Townsend, 1927

= Nemorilla =

Genus of flies

Nemorilla is a genus of flies in the family Tachinidae.

== Species ==
- Nemorilla afra Curran, 1939
- Nemorilla angustipennis (Townsend, 1927)
- Nemorilla aquila Shima, 1996
- Nemorilla chrysopollinis Chao & Shi, 1982
- Nemorilla cruciata (Wiedemann, 1830)
- Nemorilla floralis (Fallén, 1810)
- Nemorilla insolens Aldrich & Webber, 1924
- Nemorilla insulata Shima, 1996
- Nemorilla maculosa (Meigen, 1824)
- Nemorilla nemorilloides (Bezzi, 1923)
- Nemorilla oceanica Curran, 1929
- Nemorilla parva (Coquillett, 1897)
- Nemorilla pyste (Walker, 1849)
- Nemorilla ruficornis (Thomson, 1869)
- Nemorilla trivittata (Wiedemann, 1830)
- Nemorilla trivittata (Wulp, 1890)
