= Ossidingia =

Scientific classification
- Kingdom: Animalia
- Phylum: Arthropoda
- Class: Insecta
- Order: Diptera
- Family: Tachinidae
- Subfamily: Exoristinae
- Tribe: Winthemiini
- Genus: Ossidingia; Townsend, 1919

Type species
- Ossidingia cruciata Townsend, 1919

Synonyms
- Jesuimyia Townsend, 1926

Genus of flies

Ossidingia is a genus of flies in the family Tachinidae.

== Species ==
- Ossidingia cruciata (Wiedemann, 1830)

== Distribution ==
Burundi, Cameroon, Congo, Kenya, Malawi, Rwanda, South Africa, Tanzania, Uganda.
