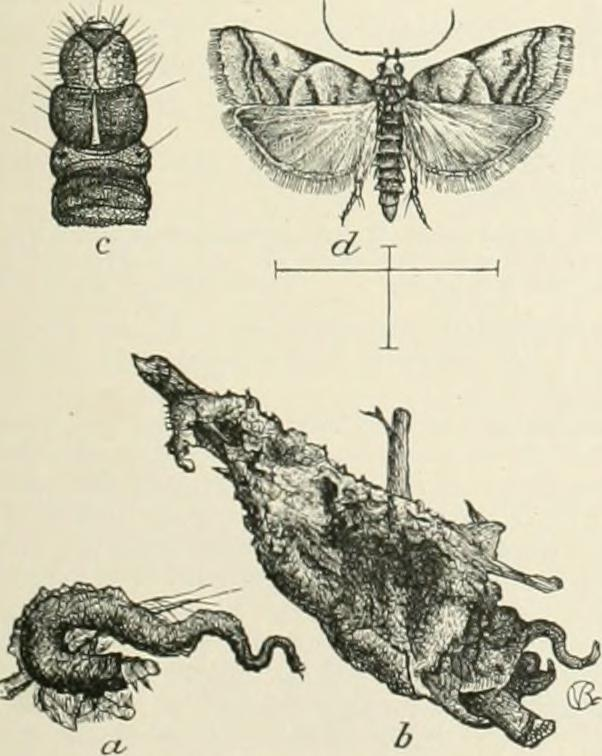

Scientific classification
- Kingdom: Animalia
- Phylum: Arthropoda
- Clade: Pancrustacea
- Class: Insecta
- Order: Lepidoptera
- Family: Pyralidae
- Genus: Acrobasis
- Species: A. indigenella

Binomial name
- Acrobasis indigenella (Zeller, 1848)

Synonyms
- Myelois indigenella Zeller, 1848; Phycita nebulo Walsh, 1860; Phycita (Acrobasis) nebulella Riley, 1872; Myelois zelatella Hulst, 1887; Mineola grossbecki Barnes & McDunnough, 1917; Acrobasis grossbecki

= Acrobasis indigenella =

Species of moth

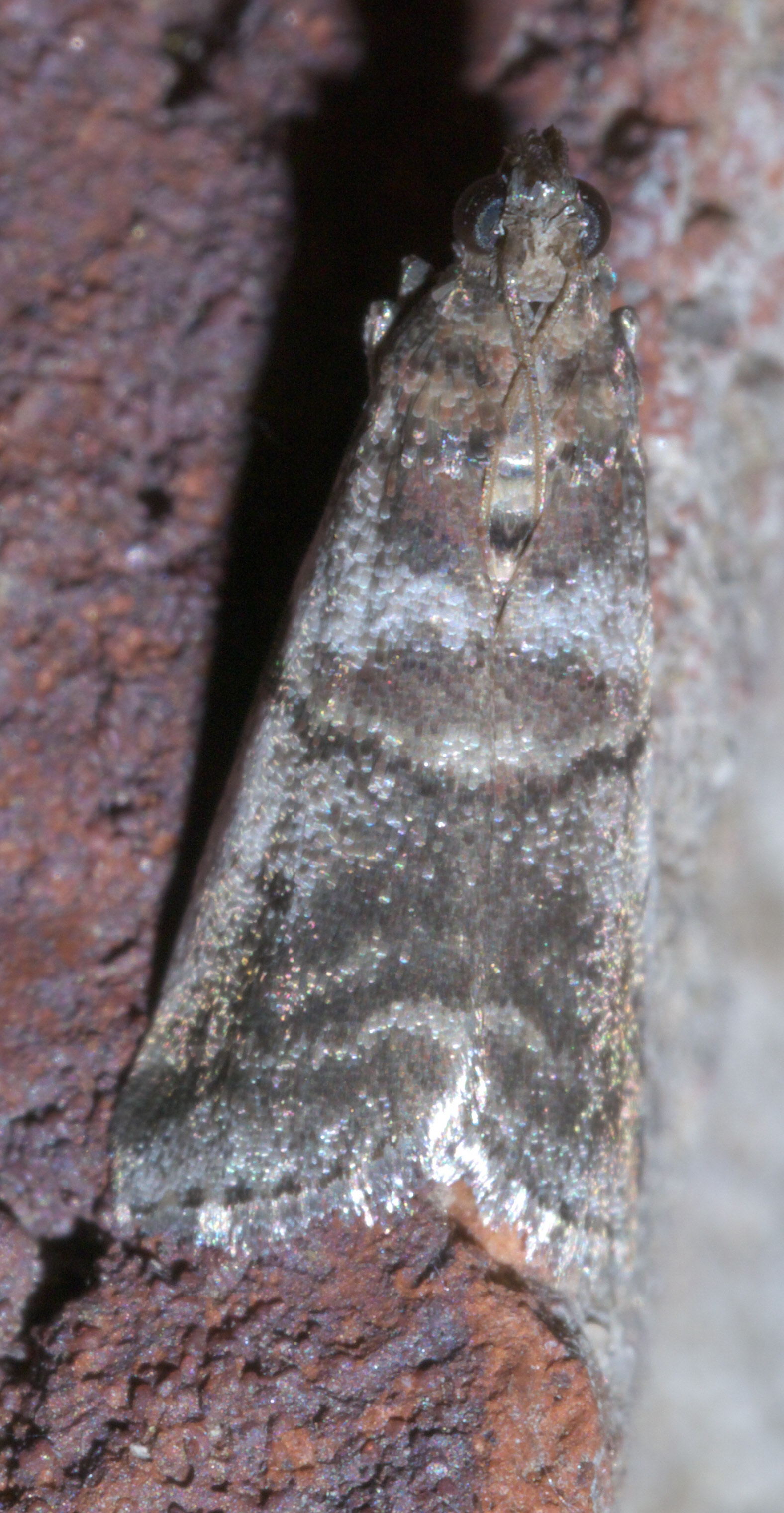
Acrobasis indigenella

Acrobasis indigenella, the leaf crumpler, is a species of snout moth in the genus Acrobasis. It was described by Philipp Christoph Zeller in 1848, and is known from eastern North America.

The wingspan is 15–20 mm. There are two generations per year in the south-eastern United States.

The larvae feed on Malus pumila, Cydonia oblonga, Prunus, Cotoneaster, Pyracantha, Crataegus and Eriobotrya japonica. Pupation takes place within the tube. They are greyish green with purplish markings above and pale greyish green on the underside. The head is pale reddish brown. The reach a length of 14.5-17.5 mm. The species overwinters in the larval stage.
