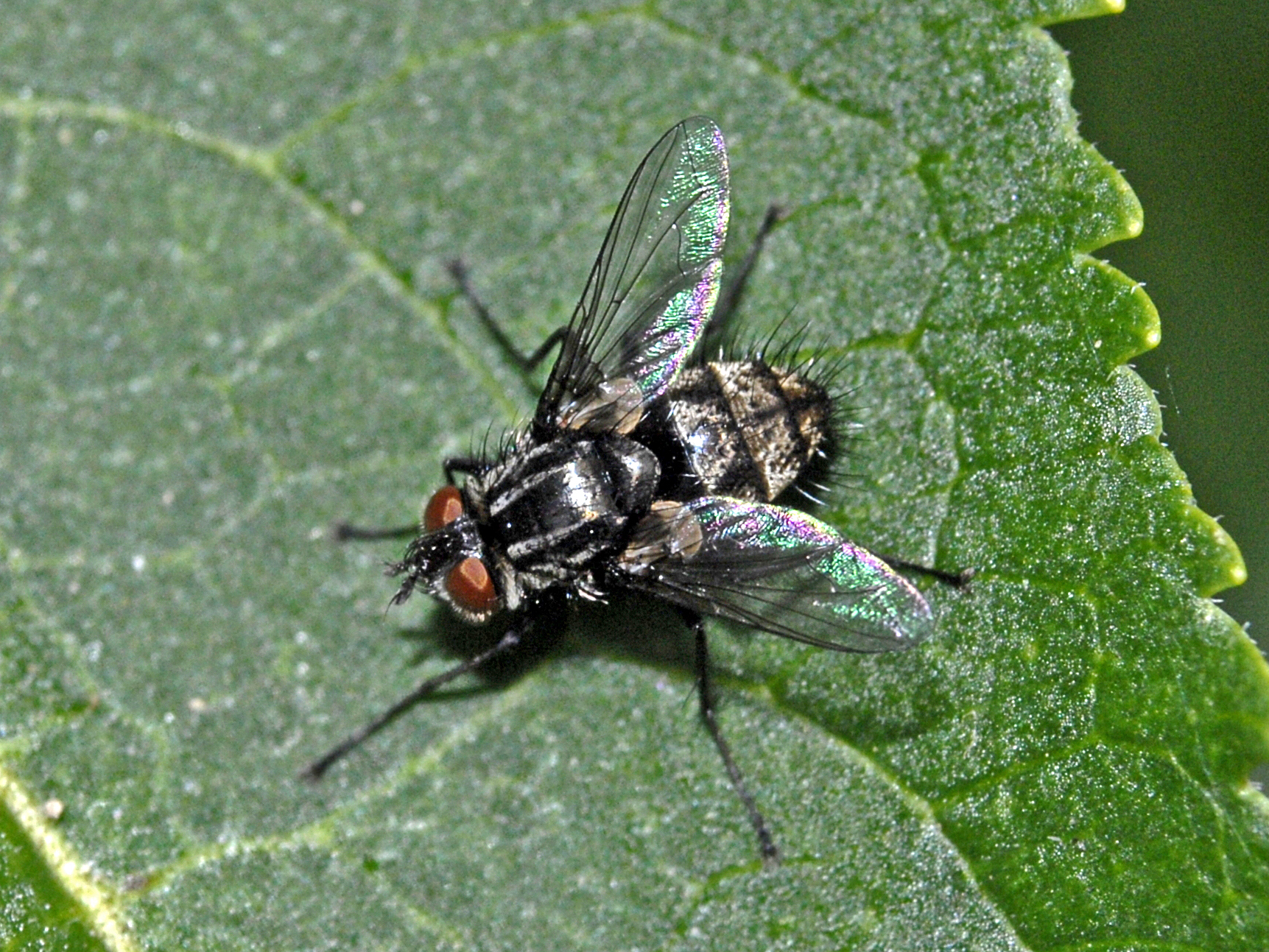
- Nemorilla floralis

Scientific classification
- Kingdom: Animalia
- Phylum: Arthropoda
- Class: Insecta
- Order: Diptera
- Family: Tachinidae
- Subfamily: Exoristinae
- Tribe: Winthemiini; Mesnil, 1939

= Winthemiini =

Tribe of flies

Winthemiini is a tribe of flies in the family Tachinidae.

== Genera ==
- Avibrissosturmia Townsend, 1927
- Euwinthemia Blanchard, 1963
- Fasslomyia Townsend, 1931
- Hemisturmia Townsend, 1927
- Nemorilla Rondani, 1856
- Orasturmia Reinhard, 1947
- Ossidingia Townsend, 1919
- Rhaphiochaeta Brauer & von Bergenstamm, 1889
- Smidtia Robineau-Desvoidy, 1830
- Triodontopyga Townsend, 1927
- Winthemia Robineau-Desvoidy, 1830
