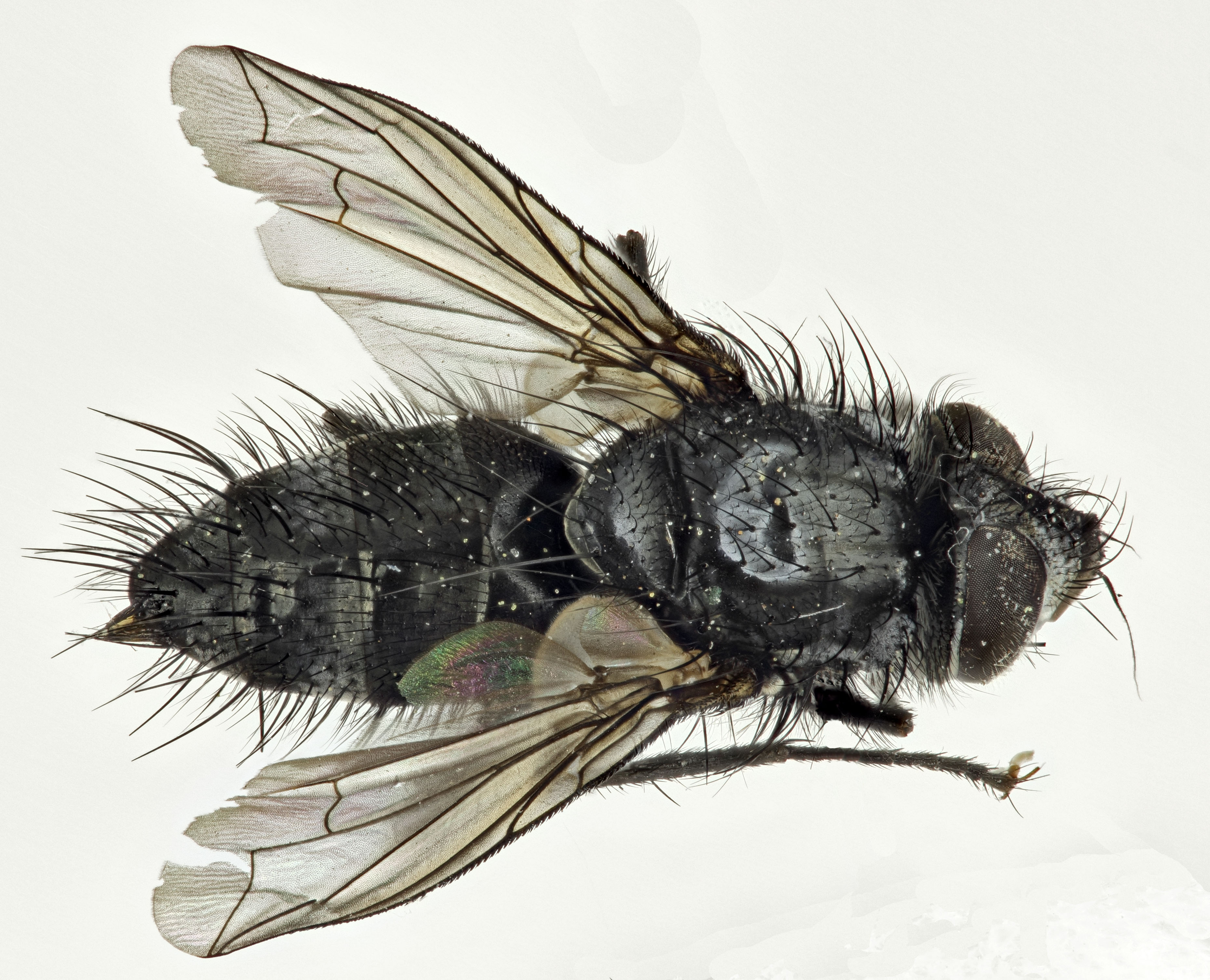
- Eumea mitis (dorsal view)

Scientific classification
- Kingdom: Animalia
- Phylum: Arthropoda
- Class: Insecta
- Order: Diptera
- Family: Tachinidae
- Subfamily: Exoristinae
- Tribe: Goniini
- Genus: Eumea; Robineau-Desvoidy, 1863

Type species
- Eumea linearicornis Robineau-Desvoidy, 1863

Synonyms
- Epimasicera Townsend, 1912; Gouraldia Robineau-Desvoidy, 1851

= Eumea =

Genus of flies

Eumea is a genus of flies in the family Tachinidae.

== Species ==
- Eumea caesar (Aldrich, 1916)
- Eumea linearicornis (Zetterstedt, 1844)
- Eumea mitis (Meigen, 1824)
