= Eumea linearicornis =

Scientific classification
- Kingdom: Animalia
- Phylum: Arthropoda
- Class: Insecta
- Order: Diptera
- Family: Tachinidae
- Subfamily: Exoristinae
- Tribe: Goniini
- Genus: Eumea
- Species: E. linearicornis

Binomial name
- Eumea linearicornis (Zetterstedt, 1844)

Synonyms
- Eumea locuples Robineau-Desvoidy, 1863; Exorista flavifrons Macquart, 1850; Exorista levis Macquart, 1850; Exorista volatica Macquart, 1850; Masicera flavifrons Macquart, 1851; Masicera lutescens Macquart, 1851; Masicera palustris Macquart, 1851; Parexorista magicornis Brauer & von Berganstamm, 1891; Parexorista tinctipennis Hendel, 1901; Phryxe aurifacies Robineau-Desvoidy, 1863; Phryxe rustica Robineau-Desvoidy, 1863; Phryxe subtilis Robineau-Desvoidy, 1863; Tachina cornuta Zetterstedt, 1844; Tachina linearicornis Zetterstedt, 1844; Tachina spernenda Zetterstedt, 1844; Tachina westermanni Zetterstedt, 1844

Species of fly

Eumea linearicornis is a species of fly in the family Tachinidae.

== Distribution ==
British Isles, Czech Republic, Hungary, Lithuania, Moldova, Poland, Romania, Slovakia, Ukraine, Denmark, Finland, Norway, Sweden, Andorra, Bulgaria, Croatia, Italy, Serbia, Spain, Turkey, Austria, Belgium, France, Germany, Netherlands, Switzerland, Japan, Russia, Transcaucasia, China.
