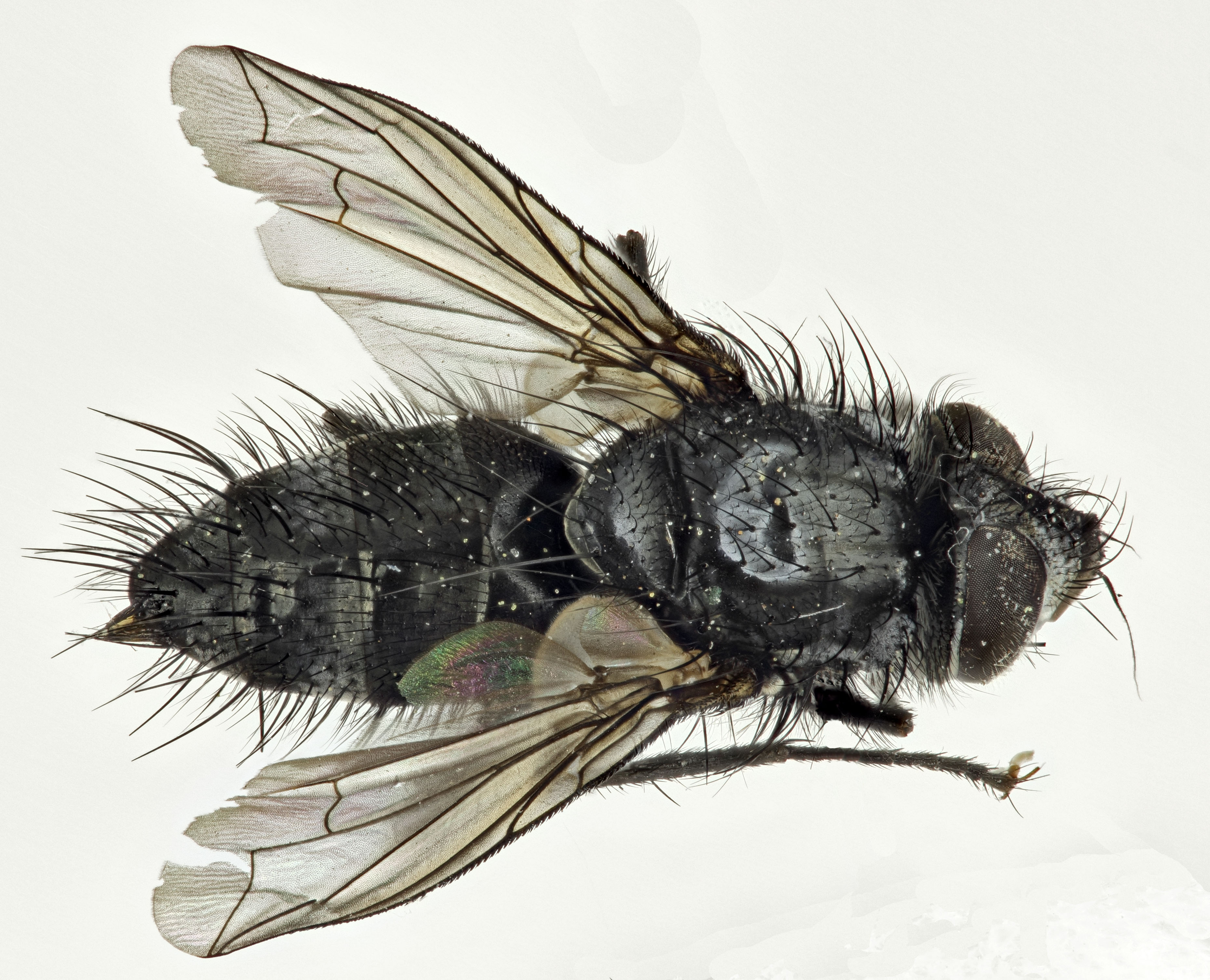
- Eumea mitis (dorsal view)

Scientific classification
- Kingdom: Animalia
- Phylum: Arthropoda
- Class: Insecta
- Order: Diptera
- Family: Tachinidae
- Subfamily: Exoristinae
- Tribe: Goniini
- Genus: Eumea
- Species: E. mitis

Binomial name
- Eumea mitis (Meigen, 1824)

Synonyms
- Tachina mitis Meigen, 1824; Exorista ardens Macquart, 1850; Phryxe nigrita Robineau-Desvoidy, 1863

= Eumea mitis =

Species of fly

Eumea mitis is a species of fly in the family Tachinidae.

== Distribution ==
British Isles, Belarus, Czech Republic, Hungary, Moldova, Poland, Romania, Slovakia, Ukraine, Denmark, Finland, Norway, Sweden, Bulgaria, Italy, Serbia, Slovenia, Spain, Austria, Belgium, France, Germany, Netherlands, Switzerland, Japan, Kazakhstan, Russia, Georgia, China.
