= Cryptomeigenia longipes =

Scientific classification
- Kingdom: Animalia
- Phylum: Arthropoda
- Class: Insecta
- Order: Diptera
- Family: Tachinidae
- Subfamily: Exoristinae
- Tribe: Blondeliini
- Genus: Cryptomeigenia
- Species: C. longipes

Binomial name
- Cryptomeigenia longipes (Thompson, 1968)

Synonyms
- Cryptomeigenioidea longipes Thompson, 1968

Species of fly

Cryptomeigenia longipes is a species of fly in the family Tachinidae.

== Distribution ==
Trinidad.
