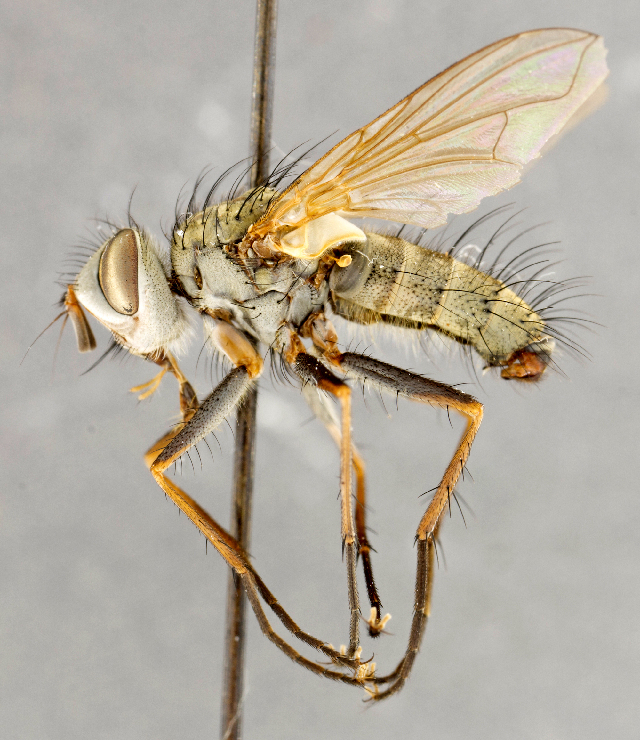

Scientific classification
- Kingdom: Animalia
- Phylum: Arthropoda
- Class: Insecta
- Order: Diptera
- Family: Tachinidae
- Subfamily: Exoristinae
- Tribe: Blondeliini
- Genus: Cryptomeigenia
- Species: C. demylus

Binomial name
- Cryptomeigenia demylus (Walker, 1849)

Synonyms
- Cryptomeigenia ontario Curran, 1926; Dexia pedestris Walker, 1853; Tachina demylus Walker, 1849; Tachina menapis Walker, 1849

= Cryptomeigenia demylus =

Species of fly

Cryptomeigenia demylus is a species of fly in the family Tachinidae.

== Distribution ==
Canada, United States.
