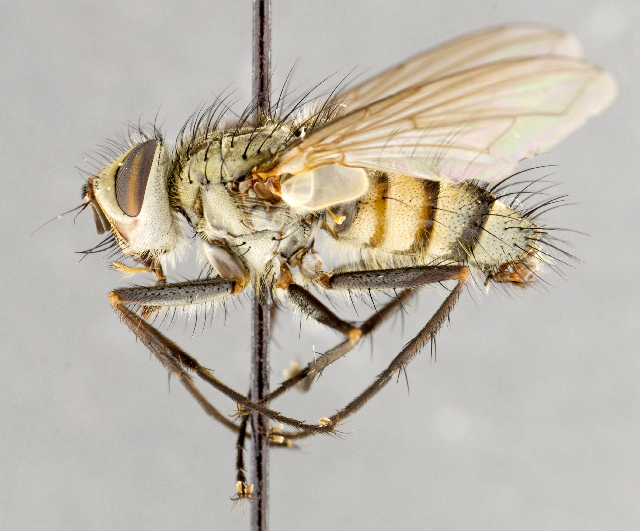
- Cryptomeigenia elegans

Scientific classification
- Kingdom: Animalia
- Phylum: Arthropoda
- Clade: Pancrustacea
- Class: Insecta
- Order: Diptera
- Family: Tachinidae
- Subfamily: Exoristinae
- Tribe: Blondeliini
- Genus: Cryptomeigenia; Brauer & von Berganstamm, 1891

Type species
- Cryptomeigenia setifacies Brauer & von Bergenstamm, 1891

Synonyms
- Cryptomeigenioidea Thompson, 1968; Meigeniella Coquillett, 1902; Emphanopteryx Townsend, 1927; Eumyothyria Townsend, 1920

= Cryptomeigenia =

Genus of flies

Cryptomeigenia is a genus of parasitic flies in the family Tachinidae. Larvae are parasitoids of adult scarab beetles.

== Species ==
- Cryptomeigenia aurifacies Walton, 1912
- Cryptomeigenia brimleyi Reinhard, 1947
- Cryptomeigenia crassipalpis Reinhard, 1947
- Cryptomeigenia demylus (Walker, 1849)
- Cryptomeigenia dubia Curran, 1926
- Cryptomeigenia elegans (Wulp, 1890)
- Cryptomeigenia flavibasis Curran, 1927
- Cryptomeigenia hinei (Coquillett, 1902)
- Cryptomeigenia illinoiensis (Townsend, 1892)
- Cryptomeigenia longipes (Thompson, 1968)
- Cryptomeigenia meridionalis (Townsend, 1912)
- Cryptomeigenia muscoides Curran, 1926
- Cryptomeigenia nigripes Curran, 1926
- Cryptomeigenia nigripilosa Curran, 1926
- Cryptomeigenia ochreigaster Curran, 1926
- Cryptomeigenia setifacies Brauer & von Berganstamm, 1891
- Cryptomeigenia simplex Curran, 1926
- Cryptomeigenia theutis (Walker, 1849)
- Cryptomeigenia triangularis Curran, 1926
