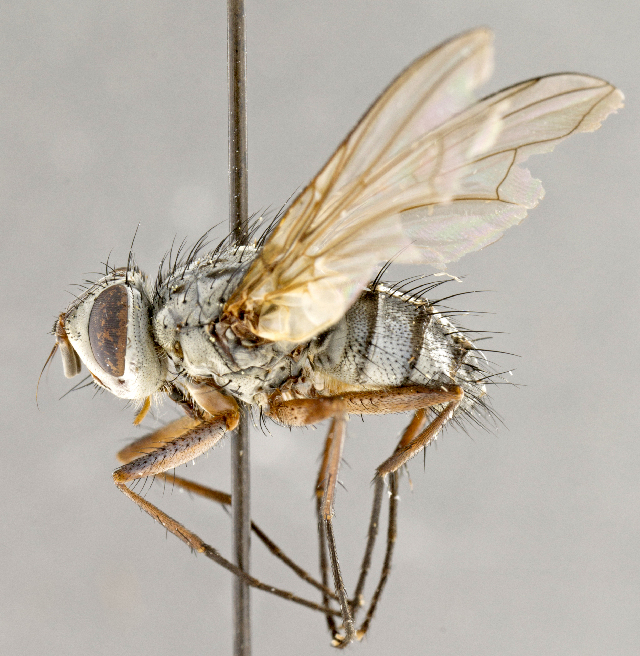

Scientific classification
- Kingdom: Animalia
- Phylum: Arthropoda
- Class: Insecta
- Order: Diptera
- Family: Tachinidae
- Subfamily: Exoristinae
- Tribe: Blondeliini
- Genus: Cryptomeigenia
- Species: C. theutis

Binomial name
- Cryptomeigenia theutis (Walker, 1849)

Synonyms
- Tachina prisca Walker, 1849; Tachina theutis Walker, 1849

= Cryptomeigenia theutis =

Species of fly

Cryptomeigenia theutis is a species of fly in the family Tachinidae.

== Distribution ==
Canada, United States.
