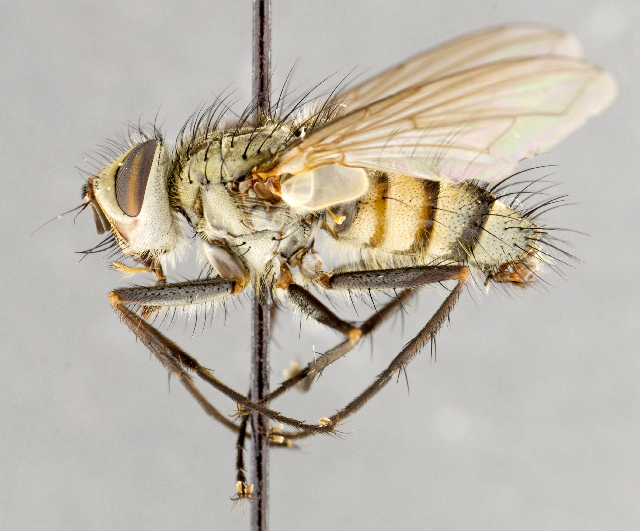

Scientific classification
- Kingdom: Animalia
- Phylum: Arthropoda
- Class: Insecta
- Order: Diptera
- Family: Tachinidae
- Subfamily: Exoristinae
- Tribe: Blondeliini
- Genus: Cryptomeigenia
- Species: C. elegans

Binomial name
- Cryptomeigenia elegans (Wulp, 1890)

Synonyms
- Hypostena elegans Wulp, 1890

= Cryptomeigenia elegans =

Species of fly

Cryptomeigenia elegans is a species of fly in the family Tachinidae.

== Distribution ==
Cryptomeigenia elegans is known from Mexico.
