= Euvespivora decipiens =

Scientific classification
- Kingdom: Animalia
- Phylum: Arthropoda
- Class: Insecta
- Order: Diptera
- Family: Tachinidae
- Subfamily: Exoristinae
- Tribe: Anacamptomyiini
- Genus: Euvespivora
- Species: E. decipiens

Binomial name
- Euvespivora decipiens (Walker, 1859)

Synonyms
- Eurygaster decipiens Walker, 1859; Euvespivora salomonica Baranov, 1942; Xenosturmia testaceipes Mesnil, 1944

Species of fly

Euvespivora decipiens is a species of fly in the family Tachinidae. Hosts include wasps from the genera Polistes and Vespa.

== Distribution ==
Japan, Malaysia, Australia, Maluku Islands, New Caledonia, Bismarck Archipelago, Papua New Guinea, Solomon Islands, Hawaii.
