= Parapales brevicornis =

Scientific classification
- Kingdom: Animalia
- Phylum: Arthropoda
- Class: Insecta
- Order: Diptera
- Family: Tachinidae
- Subfamily: Exoristinae
- Tribe: Anacamptomyiini
- Genus: Parapales
- Species: P. brevicornis

Binomial name
- Parapales brevicornis Mesnil, 1977

Species of fly

Parapales brevicornis is a species of fly in the family Tachinidae.

== Distribution ==
Madagascar.
