= Euvespivora orientalis =

Scientific classification
- Kingdom: Animalia
- Phylum: Arthropoda
- Class: Insecta
- Order: Diptera
- Family: Tachinidae
- Subfamily: Exoristinae
- Tribe: Anacamptomyiini
- Genus: Euvespivora
- Species: E. orientalis

Binomial name
- Euvespivora orientalis Baranov, 1942

Species of fly

Euvespivora orientalis is a species of fly in the family Tachinidae.

== Distribution ==
Java.
