= Parapales pallidula =

Scientific classification
- Kingdom: Animalia
- Phylum: Arthropoda
- Class: Insecta
- Order: Diptera
- Family: Tachinidae
- Subfamily: Exoristinae
- Tribe: Anacamptomyiini
- Genus: Parapales
- Species: P. pallidula

Binomial name
- Parapales pallidula (Mesnil, 1950)

Synonyms
- Ctenophorocera pallidula Mesnil, 1950

Species of fly

Parapales pallidula is a species of fly in the family Tachinidae.

== Distribution ==
Madagascar.
