= Anacamptomyia rufescens =

Scientific classification
- Kingdom: Animalia
- Phylum: Arthropoda
- Class: Insecta
- Order: Diptera
- Family: Tachinidae
- Subfamily: Exoristinae
- Tribe: Anacamptomyiini
- Genus: Anacamptomyia
- Species: A. rufescens

Binomial name
- Anacamptomyia rufescens (Villeneuve, 1910)

Synonyms
- Roubaudia rufescens Villeneuve, 1910

Species of fly

Anacamptomyia rufescens is a species of fly in the family Tachinidae.

== Distribution ==
Benin, Nigeria.
