= Anacamptomyia africana =

- Anacamptomyia africana in Mozambique

Scientific classification
- Kingdom: Animalia
- Phylum: Arthropoda
- Clade: Pancrustacea
- Class: Insecta
- Order: Diptera
- Family: Tachinidae
- Subfamily: Exoristinae
- Tribe: Anacamptomyiini
- Genus: Anacamptomyia
- Species: A. africana

Binomial name
- Anacamptomyia africana Bischof, 1904

Species of fly

Anacamptomyia africana is a species of fly in the family Tachinidae.

== Distribution ==
D.R. Congo, Kenya, Madagascar, Mozambique, Nigeria, Senegal, South Africa, Tanzania.
