= Koralliomyia =

Scientific classification
- Kingdom: Animalia
- Phylum: Arthropoda
- Class: Insecta
- Order: Diptera
- Family: Tachinidae
- Subfamily: Exoristinae
- Tribe: Anacamptomyiini
- Genus: Koralliomyia; Mesnil, 1950

Type species
- Koralliomyia portentosa Mesnil, 1950

Synonyms
- Koralliomyia Mesnil, 1949; Karalliomyia Mesnil, 1950

Genus of flies

Koralliomyia is a genus of parasitic flies in the family Tachinidae.

== Species ==
- Koralliomyia portentosa Mesnil, 1950

== Distribution ==
India, Australia.
