= Parapales =

Scientific classification
- Kingdom: Animalia
- Phylum: Arthropoda
- Class: Insecta
- Order: Diptera
- Family: Tachinidae
- Subfamily: Exoristinae
- Tribe: Anacamptomyiini
- Genus: Parapales; Mesnil, 1950

Type species
- Ctenophorocera (Parapales) pallidula Mesnil, 1950

Synonyms
- Parapales Mesnil, 1949

Genus of flies

Parapales is a genus of parasitic flies in the family Tachinidae.

== Species ==
- Parapales brevicornis Mesnil, 1977
- Parapales brunnea Mesnil, 1977
- Parapales luteicornis Mesnil, 1977
- Parapales micronychia Mesnil, 1977
- Parapales pallidula (Mesnil, 1950)
- Parapales pectinipes Mesnil, 1977

== Distribution ==
Madagascar
