= Isochaetina =

Scientific classification
- Kingdom: Animalia
- Phylum: Arthropoda
- Class: Insecta
- Order: Diptera
- Family: Tachinidae
- Subfamily: Exoristinae
- Tribe: Anacamptomyiini
- Genus: Isochaetina; Mesnil, 1950

Type species
- Drino (Isochaetina) dimorpha Mesnil, 1950

Genus of flies

Isochaetina is a genus of parasitic flies in the family Tachinidae.

== Species ==
- Isochaetina dimorpha (Mesnil, 1950)

== Distribution ==
This genus is known from India.
