= Euvespivora =

Scientific classification
- Kingdom: Animalia
- Phylum: Arthropoda
- Class: Insecta
- Order: Diptera
- Family: Tachinidae
- Subfamily: Exoristinae
- Tribe: Anacamptomyiini
- Genus: Euvespivora; Baranov, 1942

Type species
- Euvespivora orientalis Baranov, 1942

Synonyms
- Xenosturmia Mesnil, 1944

Genus of flies

Euvespivora is a genus of flies in the family Tachinidae.

== Species ==
- Euvespivora decipiens (Walker, 1859)
- Euvespivora orientalis Baranov, 1942
