= Anacamptomyia =

- Anacamptomyia africana

Scientific classification
- Kingdom: Animalia
- Phylum: Arthropoda
- Clade: Pancrustacea
- Class: Insecta
- Order: Diptera
- Family: Tachinidae
- Subfamily: Exoristinae
- Tribe: Anacamptomyiini
- Genus: Anacamptomyia; Bischof, 1904

Type species
- Anacamptomyia africana Bischof, 1904

Synonyms
- Anacomptomyia Curran, 1927; Neoroubaudia Roubaud, 1924; Pararoubaudia Roubaud & Villeneuve, 1914; Roubaudia Villeneuve, 1910; Vespivora Malloch, 1930

Genus of flies

Anacamptomyia is a genus of flies in the family Tachinidae.

== Species ==
- Anacamptomyia africana Bischof, 1904
- Anacamptomyia aurifrons Zeegers, 2014
- Anacamptomyia bisetosa (Roubaud & Villeneuve, 1914)
- Anacamptomyia blommersi Zeegers, 2014
- Anacamptomyia gymnops Zeegers, 2007
- Anacamptomyia nigriventris (Malloch, 1930)
- Anacamptomyia obscurella Mesnil, 1950
- Anacamptomyia pallida Roubaud & Villeneuve, 1914
- Anacamptomyia pruinosa (Roubaud & Villeneuve, 1914)
- Anacamptomyia rufescens (Villeneuve, 1910)
