= Leucocarcelia =

Scientific classification
- Kingdom: Animalia
- Phylum: Arthropoda
- Class: Insecta
- Order: Diptera
- Family: Tachinidae
- Subfamily: Exoristinae
- Tribe: Anacamptomyiini
- Genus: Leucocarcelia; Villeneuve, 1921

Type species
- Leucocarcelia argyrata Villeneuve, 1921

Genus of flies

Leucocarcelia is a genus of flies in the family Tachinidae.

== Species ==
- Leucocarcelia argyrata Villeneuve, 1921

== Distribution ==
Malawi.
