= Anacamptomyiini =

- Anacamptomyia africana

Scientific classification
- Kingdom: Animalia
- Phylum: Arthropoda
- Clade: Pancrustacea
- Class: Insecta
- Order: Diptera
- Family: Tachinidae
- Subfamily: Exoristinae
- Tribe: Anacamptomyiini

Tribe of flies

Anacamptomyiini is a tribe of flies in the family Tachinidae.

== Genera ==
- Anacamptomyia Bischof, 1904
- Euvespivora Baranov, 1942
- Isochaetina Mesnil, 1950
- Koralliomyia Mesnil, 1950
- Leucocarcelia Villeneuve, 1921
- Parapales Mesnil, 1950
