= Calolydella =

Scientific classification
- Kingdom: Animalia
- Phylum: Arthropoda
- Class: Insecta
- Order: Diptera
- Family: Tachinidae
- Subfamily: Exoristinae
- Tribe: Blondeliini
- Genus: Calolydella; Townsend, 1927

Type species
- Calolydella geminata Townsend, 1927

Synonyms
- Olindopsis Townsend, 1927; Prodexodes Townsend, 1927; Pygophorinia Townsend, 1927

Genus of flies

Calolydella is a genus of parasitoid flies in the family Tachinidae. This genus has been shown to primarily parasitize multiple species of caterpillars across a wide variety of families (Lepidoptera: Crambidae; Erebidae; Geometridae; Hesperiidae; Lycaenidae; Nymphalidae; Pieridae; Riodinidae; and Sphingidae).

== Species ==
- Calolydella adelinamoralesae Fleming & Wood, 2018
- Calolydella alexanderjamesi Fleming & Wood, 2018
- Calolydella andinensis (Townsend, 1927)
- Calolydella argentea Fleming & Wood, 2018
- Calolydella aureofacies Fleming & Wood, 2018
- Calolydella bicolor Fleming & Wood, 2018
- Calolydella bifissus Fleming & Wood, 2018
- Calolydella blandita (Wulp, 1890)
- Calolydella cingulata (Schiner, 1868)
- Calolydella concinna (Wulp, 1890)
- Calolydella crocata Fleming & Wood, 2018
- Calolydella cylindriventris (Wulp, 1890)
- Calolydella destituta Fleming & Wood, 2018
- Calolydella discalis Fleming & Wood, 2018
- Calolydella erasmocoronadoi Fleming & Wood, 2018
- Calolydella felipechavarriai Fleming & Wood, 2018
- Calolydella fredriksjobergi Fleming & Wood, 2018
- Calolydella geminata Townsend, 1927
- Calolydella gentica (Walker, 1860)
- Calolydella inflatipalpis Fleming & Wood, 2018
- Calolydella interrupta Fleming & Wood, 2018
- Calolydella lathami (Curran, 1925)
- Calolydella leucophaea (Wulp, 1890)
- Calolydella nigripalpis Fleming & Wood, 2018
- Calolydella omissa Fleming & Wood, 2018
- Calolydella ordinalis Fleming & Wood, 2018
- Calolydella peruviana (Townsend, 1927)
- Calolydella renemalaisei Fleming & Wood, 2018
- Calolydella rufiventris (Townsend, 1927)
- Calolydella summatis Reinhard, 1975
- Calolydella susanaroibasae Fleming & Wood, 2018
- Calolydella tanyadapkeyae Fleming & Wood, 2018
- Calolydella tenebrosa Fleming & Wood, 2018
- Calolydella timjamesi Fleming & Wood, 2018
- Calolydella triangulifera (Bigot, 1889)
- Calolydella trifasciata (Walker, 1837)
- Calolydella virginiajamesae Fleming & Wood, 2018
