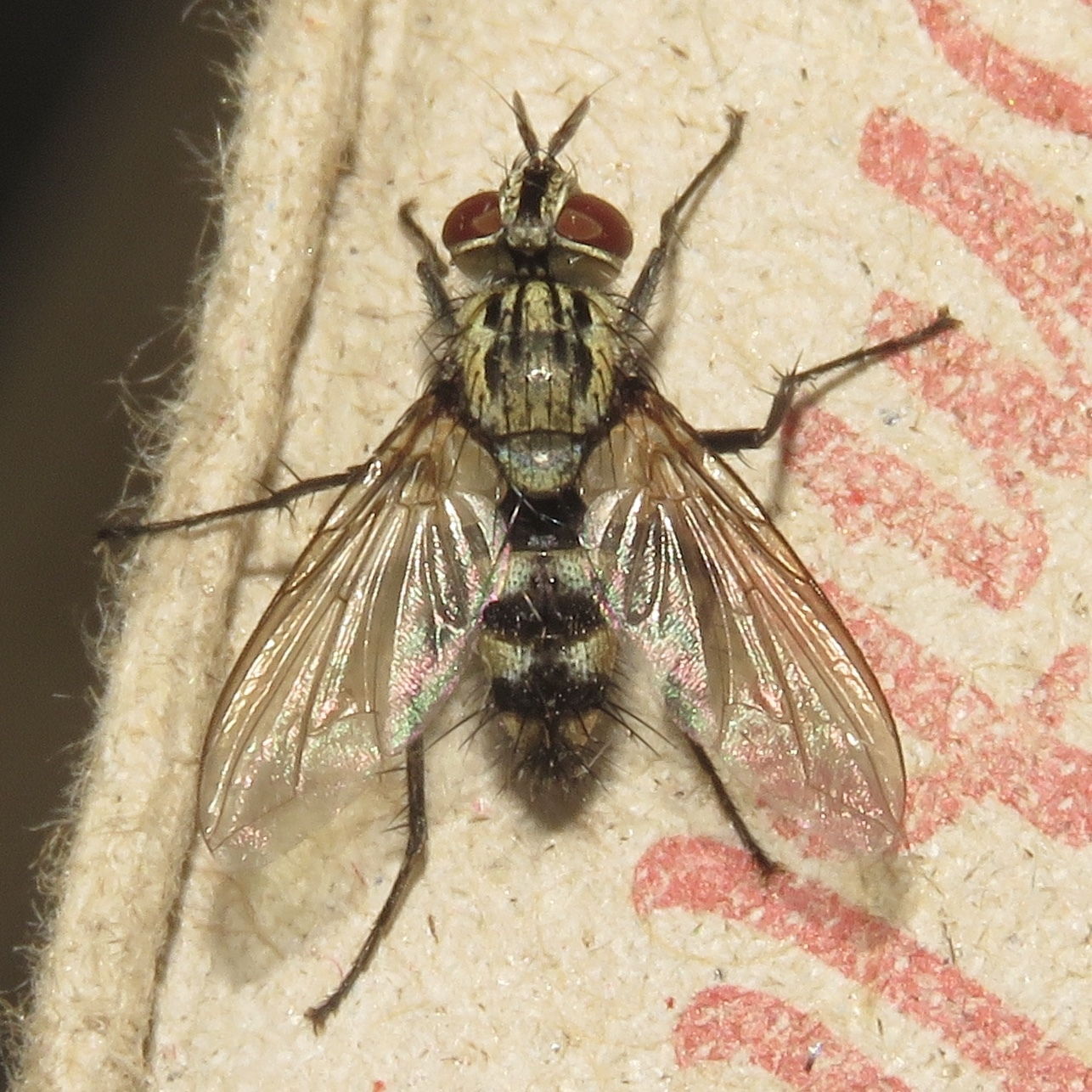

Scientific classification
- Kingdom: Animalia
- Phylum: Arthropoda
- Class: Insecta
- Order: Diptera
- Family: Tachinidae
- Subfamily: Exoristinae
- Tribe: Blondeliini
- Genus: Calolydella
- Species: C. lathami

Binomial name
- Calolydella lathami (Curran, 1925)

Synonyms
- Lydella lathami Curran, 1925

= Calolydella lathami =

Species of fly

Calolydella lathami is a species of bristle fly in the family Tachinidae.

== Distribution ==
Canada, United States.
