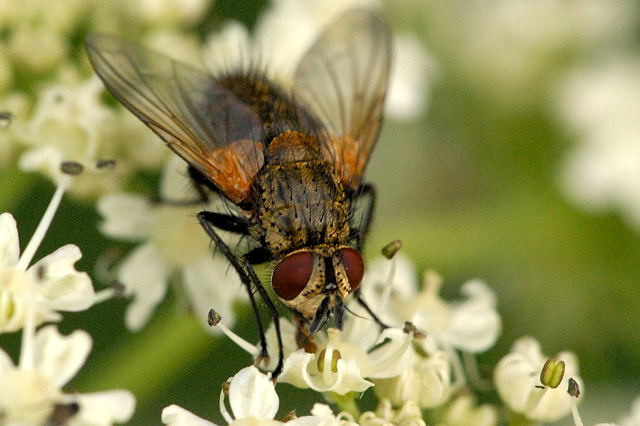
- Allophorocera ferruginea

Scientific classification
- Kingdom: Animalia
- Phylum: Arthropoda
- Class: Insecta
- Order: Diptera
- Family: Tachinidae
- Subfamily: Exoristinae
- Tribe: Goniini
- Genus: Allophorocera
- Species: A. ferruginea

Binomial name
- Allophorocera ferruginea (Meigen, 1824)

Synonyms
- Tachina ferruginea Meigen, 1824; Exorista rutilla Rondani, 1859; Tachina subpruinosa Zetterstedt, 1859; Tachina validicornis Zetterstedt, 1838

= Allophorocera ferruginea =

Species of fly

Allophorocera ferruginea is a species of bristle fly in the family Tachinidae.

== Distribution ==
British Isles, Czech Republic, Estonia, Hungary, Poland, Romania, Slovakia, Ukraine, Denmark, Finland, Norway, Sweden, Bulgaria, Italy, Turkey, Austria, Belgium, Channel Islands, France, Germany, Netherlands, Switzerland, Japan, Mongolia, Russia, Transcaucasia.
