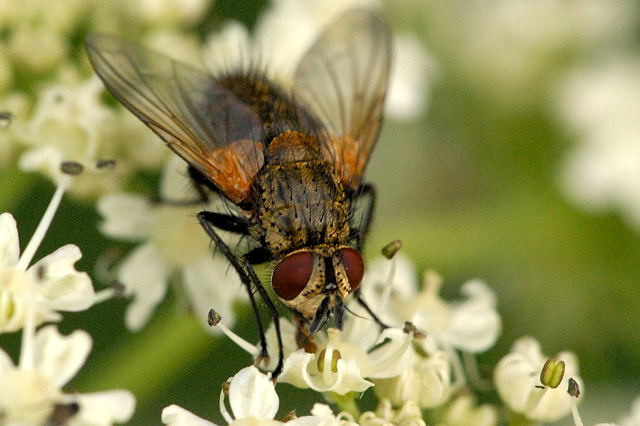
- Allophorocera ferruginea

Scientific classification
- Kingdom: Animalia
- Phylum: Arthropoda
- Class: Insecta
- Order: Diptera
- Family: Tachinidae
- Subfamily: Exoristinae
- Tribe: Goniini
- Genus: Allophorocera; Hendel, 1901

Type species
- Dexodes auripilus Brauer & von Berganstamm, 1891

Synonyms
- Erycilla Mesnil, 1957; Pilatea Townsend, 1916; Sisyrosturmia Townsend, 1926

= Allophorocera =

Genus of flies

Allophorocera is a genus of parasitoid flies in the family Tachinidae.

== Species ==
- Allophorocera aldrichi (Curran, 1927)
- Allophorocera angulata Wood & Richter, 2004
- Allophorocera arator (Aldrich, 1925)
- Allophorocera australis (Coquillett, 1897)
- Allophorocera celeris (Coquillett, 1897)
- Allophorocera chaetosa (Townsend, 1926)
- Allophorocera cinerea (Chao & Liang, 1982)
- Allophorocera delecta (Curran, 1927)
- Allophorocera ferruginea (Meigen, 1824)
- Allophorocera flavipruina (Chao & Liang, 1982)
- Allophorocera flavitarsa (Reinhard, 1934)
- Allophorocera lapponica Wood, 1974
- Allophorocera occidentalis (Coquillett, 1897)
- Allophorocera pachystyla (Macquart, 1851)
- Allophorocera picata (Reinhard, 1953)
- Allophorocera ruficornis (Smith, 1917)
- Allophorocera rufipes (Brauer & von Berganstamm, 1891)
- Allophorocera rutila (Meigen, 1824)
- Allophorocera sajanica Mesnil, 1963
- Allophorocera sectilis (Reinhard, 1953)
- Allophorocera varifrons (Curran, 1927)
