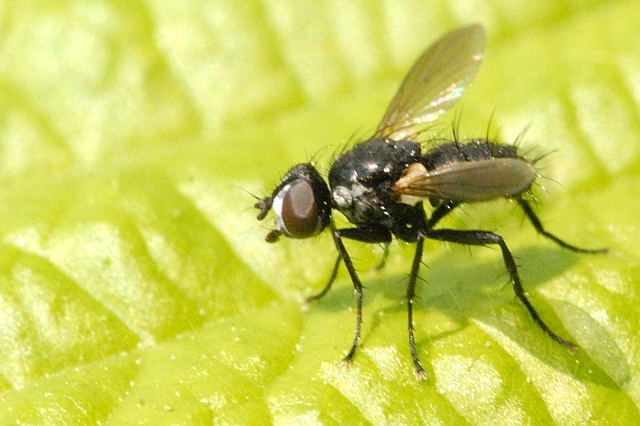
- Gastrolepta anthracina

Scientific classification
- Kingdom: Animalia
- Phylum: Arthropoda
- Class: Insecta
- Order: Diptera
- Family: Tachinidae
- Subfamily: Exoristinae
- Tribe: Blondeliini
- Genus: Gastrolepta; Rondani, 1862

Type species
- Gastrolepta gentilis Rondani, 1862

Synonyms
- Eumedoria Townsend, 1916

= Gastrolepta =

Genus of flies

Gastrolepta is a genus of flies in the family Tachinidae.

== Species ==
- Gastrolepta anthracina (Meigen, 1826)

== Distribution ==
Tajikistan, China, British Isles, Czech Republic, Hungary, Lithuania, Moldova, Poland, Romania, Slovakia, Ukraine, Norway, Sweden, Andorra, Bulgaria, Croatia, Greece, Italy, Portugal, Serbia, Spain, Austria, Belgium, France, Germany, Netherlands, Switzerland, Israel, Russia, Transcaucasia.
