= Patelloa =

Scientific classification
- Kingdom: Animalia
- Phylum: Arthropoda
- Clade: Pancrustacea
- Class: Insecta
- Order: Diptera
- Family: Tachinidae
- Subfamily: Exoristinae
- Tribe: Goniini
- Genus: Patelloa; Townsend, 1916

Type species
- Phorocera leucaniae Coquillett, 1897

Synonyms
- Catagoniopsis Townsend, 1926; Macropatelloa Townsend, 1931; Patelloapsis Townsend, 1927; Pateloa Curran, 1934; Yahuarphryno Townsend, 1927

Genus of flies

Patelloa is a genus of flies in the family Tachinidae.

== Species ==
- Patelloa concolor (Townsend, 1929)
- Patelloa facialis (Coquillett, 1897)
- Patelloa fulviceps (Wulp, 1890)
- Patelloa fuscimacula (Aldrich & Webber, 1924)
- Patelloa leucaniae (Coquillett, 1897)
- Patelloa meracanthae (Greene, 1921)
- Patelloa nigripalpis Thompson, 1963
- Patelloa oeceticola (Blanchard, 1963)
- Patelloa pachypyga (Aldrich & Webber, 1924)
- Patelloa patelloides (Townsend, 1927)
- Patelloa pluriseriata (Aldrich & Webber, 1924)
- Patelloa reinhardi (Aldrich & Webber, 1924)
- Patelloa setifrons (Aldrich & Webber, 1924)
- Patelloa silvatica (Aldrich & Webber, 1924)
- Patelloa similis (Townsend, 1927)
- Patelloa specularis (Aldrich & Webber, 1924)
- Patelloa tanumeana (Townsend, 1931)
