= Patelloa silvatica =

Scientific classification
- Kingdom: Animalia
- Phylum: Arthropoda
- Class: Insecta
- Order: Diptera
- Family: Tachinidae
- Subfamily: Exoristinae
- Tribe: Goniini
- Genus: Patelloa
- Species: P. silvatica

Binomial name
- Patelloa silvatica (Aldrich & Webber, 1924)

Synonyms
- Phorocera silvatica Aldrich & Webber, 1924

Species of fly

Patelloa silvatica is a species of bristle fly in the family Tachinidae.

== Distribution ==
Canada, United States.
