= Patelloa leucaniae =

Scientific classification
- Kingdom: Animalia
- Phylum: Arthropoda
- Class: Insecta
- Order: Diptera
- Family: Tachinidae
- Subfamily: Exoristinae
- Tribe: Goniini
- Genus: Patelloa
- Species: P. leucaniae

Binomial name
- Patelloa leucaniae Coquillett, 1897

Synonyms
- Phorocera leucaniae Coquillett, 1897

Species of fly

Patelloa leucaniae is a species of bristle fly in the family Tachinidae.

== Distribution ==
Canada, United States.
