= Phyllophilopsis =

Scientific classification
- Kingdom: Animalia
- Phylum: Arthropoda
- Class: Insecta
- Order: Diptera
- Family: Tachinidae
- Subfamily: Exoristinae
- Tribe: Blondeliini
- Genus: Phyllophilopsis; Townsend, 1915

Type species
- Chaetona nitens Coquillett, 1899

Synonyms
- Phyllophila Townsend, 1915; Phillophilopsis Curran, 1934; Urochaetona Townsend, 1919; Microchaetona Townsend, 1919; Michrochaetona Townsend, 1919; Xanthophyllophila Townsend, 1927; Neophyllophila Townsend, 1927; Urophyllophila Townsend, 1927; Epiphyllophila Townsend, 1927; Microchaetonops Townsend, 1934; Xanthochaetona Townsend, 1934; Canalia Curran, 1934; Maracajuia Townsend, 1939; Urohypomyia Townsend, 1939; Microleskia Thompson, 1968

Genus of flies

Phyllophilopsis is a genus of flies in the family Tachinidae.

== Species ==
- Phyllophilopsis albifacies (Bigot, 1889)
- Phyllophilopsis anomala (Townsend, 1939)
- Phyllophilopsis caudata (Townsend, 1927)
- Phyllophilopsis disgracilis Nihei & Dios, 2016
- Phyllophilopsis dolichotarsis (Curran, 1934)
- Phyllophilopsis evanida Reinhard, 1958
- Phyllophilopsis fasciata (Curran, 1934)
- Phyllophilopsis gracilis (Townsend, 1919)
- Phyllophilopsis longipes (Thompson, 1968)
- Phyllophilopsis longitarsus (Wulp, 1891)
- Phyllophilopsis medinops (Townsend, 1934)
- Phyllophilopsis neotropica (Townsend, 1927)
- Phyllophilopsis nitens (Coquillett, 1899)
- Phyllophilopsis pallidicornis (Bigot, 1889)
- Phyllophilopsis similis (Townsend, 1934)
- Phyllophilopsis tenuifrons Curran, 1934
