= Phyllophilopsis nitens =

Scientific classification
- Kingdom: Animalia
- Phylum: Arthropoda
- Class: Insecta
- Order: Diptera
- Family: Tachinidae
- Subfamily: Exoristinae
- Tribe: Blondeliini
- Genus: Phyllophilopsis
- Species: P. nitens

Binomial name
- Phyllophilopsis nitens (Coquillett, 1899)

Synonyms
- Chaetona nitens Coquillett, 1899

Species of fly

Phyllophilopsis nitens is a species of bristle fly in the family Tachinidae.

== Distribution ==
Canada, United States.
