= Froggattimyia =

Scientific classification
- Kingdom: Animalia
- Phylum: Arthropoda
- Class: Insecta
- Order: Diptera
- Family: Tachinidae
- Subfamily: Exoristinae
- Tribe: Blondeliini
- Genus: Froggattimyia; Townsend, 1916

Type species
- Froggattimyia hirta Townsend, 1916

Synonyms
- Protomeigenia Townsend, 1916

Genus of flies

Froggattimyia is a genus of parasitic flies in the family Tachinidae.

== Species ==
- Froggattimyia aurea Townsend, 1916
- Froggattimyia carnei Colless, 2012
- Froggattimyia coracina Colless, 2012
- Froggattimyia fergusoni Malloch, 1934
- Froggattimyia hirta Townsend, 1916
- Froggattimyia macdonaldi Colless, 2012
- Froggattimyia nicholsoni Malloch, 1934
- Froggattimyia truncata Colless, 2012
- Froggattimyia vicina Colless, 2012
- Froggattimyia wentworthi Malloch, 1934
- Froggattimyia woodorum Colless, 2012.
