= Froggattimyia nicholsoni =

Scientific classification
- Kingdom: Animalia
- Phylum: Arthropoda
- Clade: Pancrustacea
- Class: Insecta
- Order: Diptera
- Family: Tachinidae
- Subfamily: Exoristinae
- Tribe: Blondeliini
- Genus: Froggattimyia
- Species: F. nicholsoni

Binomial name
- Froggattimyia nicholsoni Malloch, 1934

Species of fly

Froggattimyia nicholsoni is a species of fly in the family Tachinidae.

== Distribution ==
Australia.
