= Froggattimyia hirta =

Scientific classification
- Kingdom: Animalia
- Phylum: Arthropoda
- Clade: Pancrustacea
- Class: Insecta
- Order: Diptera
- Family: Tachinidae
- Subfamily: Exoristinae
- Tribe: Blondeliini
- Genus: Froggattimyia
- Species: F. hirta

Binomial name
- Froggattimyia hirta Townsend, 1916

Species of fly

Froggattimyia hirta is a species of fly in the family Tachinidae.

== Distribution ==
Australia.
