= Actinodoria cuprea =

Scientific classification
- Kingdom: Animalia
- Phylum: Arthropoda
- Class: Insecta
- Order: Diptera
- Family: Tachinidae
- Subfamily: Exoristinae
- Tribe: Blondeliini
- Genus: Actinodoria
- Species: A. cuprea

Binomial name
- Actinodoria cuprea Townsend, 1927

Species of fly

Actinodoria cuprea is a species of bristle fly in the family Tachinidae.

== Distribution ==
Trinidad and Tobago.
