= Actinodoria =

Scientific classification
- Kingdom: Animalia
- Phylum: Arthropoda
- Class: Insecta
- Order: Diptera
- Family: Tachinidae
- Subfamily: Exoristinae
- Tribe: Blondeliini
- Genus: Actinodoria; Townsend, 1927

Type species
- Actinodoria cuprea Townsend, 1927

Genus of flies

Actinodoria is a genus of tachinid flies in the family Tachinidae. The only known tachinid parasitoid of a dragonfly is believed to belong to this genus, and was discovered as a larva living near the dragonfly's wing muscles.

== Species ==
- Actinodoria argentata Reinhard, 1975
- Actinodoria argentea Thompson, 1964
- Actinodoria argentifrons (Wulp, 1890)
- Actinodoria cuprea Townsend, 1927
