= Dolichocoxys femoralis =

Scientific classification
- Kingdom: Animalia
- Phylum: Arthropoda
- Class: Insecta
- Order: Diptera
- Family: Tachinidae
- Subfamily: Exoristinae
- Tribe: Blondeliini
- Genus: Dolichocoxys
- Species: D. femoralis

Binomial name
- Dolichocoxys femoralis Townsend, 1927

Species of fly

Dolichocoxys femoralis is a species of fly in the family Tachinidae.

== Distribution ==
Myanmar, Sumatra.
