= Dolichocoxys =

Scientific classification
- Kingdom: Animalia
- Phylum: Arthropoda
- Clade: Pancrustacea
- Class: Insecta
- Order: Diptera
- Family: Tachinidae
- Subfamily: Exoristinae
- Tribe: Blondeliini
- Genus: Dolichocoxys; Townsend, 1927

Type species
- Dolichocoxys femoralis Townsend, 1927

Genus of flies

Dolichocoxys is a genus of flies in the family Tachinidae.

== Species ==
- Dolichocoxys brevis Zhou, Wei & Luo, 2012
- Dolichocoxys femoralis Townsend, 1927
- Dolichocoxys flavibasis Zhou, Wei & Luo, 2012
- Dolichocoxys obscurus Zhou, Wei & Luo, 2012
- Dolichocoxys rossica Mesnil, 1963
- Dolichocoxys unisetus Zhi, Liu & Zhang, 2016
- Dolichocoxys wangi Zhang & Liu, 2008
