= Borgmeiermyia brasiliana =

Scientific classification
- Kingdom: Animalia
- Phylum: Arthropoda
- Class: Insecta
- Order: Diptera
- Family: Tachinidae
- Subfamily: Exoristinae
- Tribe: Blondeliini
- Genus: Borgmeiermyia
- Species: B. brasiliana

Binomial name
- Borgmeiermyia brasiliana Townsend, 1935

Species of fly

Borgmeiermyia brasiliana is a species of fly in the family Tachinidae.

== Distribution ==
Brazil.
