= Borgmeiermyia =

Scientific classification
- Kingdom: Animalia
- Phylum: Arthropoda
- Clade: Pancrustacea
- Class: Insecta
- Order: Diptera
- Family: Tachinidae
- Subfamily: Exoristinae
- Tribe: Blondeliini
- Genus: Borgmeiermyia; Townsend, 1935

Type species
- Borgmeiermyia brasiliana Townsend, 1935

Genus of flies

Borgmeiermyia is a genus of tachinid flies in the family Tachinidae. Individuals of this genus are 3-7mm long and black in ground colour with a golden dusting pattern on the thorax. Males are multifissicorn - the third antennal segment is multi-branched.

== Species ==
- Borgmeiermyia brasiliana Townsend, 1919
- Borgmeiermyia paraguayana Sehnal, 1998
- Borgmeiermyia peruana Arnaud, 1963
- Borgmeiermyia rozeni Arnaud, 1963
