= Hemimacquartia paradoxa =

Scientific classification
- Kingdom: Animalia
- Phylum: Arthropoda
- Class: Insecta
- Order: Diptera
- Family: Tachinidae
- Subfamily: Exoristinae
- Tribe: Blondeliini
- Genus: Hemimacquartia
- Species: H. paradoxa

Binomial name
- Hemimacquartia paradoxa Brauer & von Bergenstamm, 1893

Species of fly

Hemimacquartia paradoxa is a European species of fly in the family Tachinidae.

== Distribution ==
British Isles, Czech Republic, Poland, Slovakia, Denmark, Norway, Sweden, Italy, Belgium, Germany, Netherlands, Switzerland.
