= Hemimacquartia =

Scientific classification
- Kingdom: Animalia
- Phylum: Arthropoda
- Class: Insecta
- Order: Diptera
- Family: Tachinidae
- Subfamily: Exoristinae
- Tribe: Blondeliini
- Genus: Hemimacquartia; Brauer & von Bergenstamm, 1893

Type species
- Hemimacquartia paradoxa Brauer & Bergenstamm, 1893

Genus of flies

Hemimacquartia is a genus of flies in the family Tachinidae.

== Species ==
- Hemimacquartia paradoxa Brauer & Bergenstamm, 1893

== Distribution ==
British Isles, Czech Republic, Poland, Slovakia, Denmark, Norway, Sweden, Italy, Belgium, Germany, Netherlands, Switzerland.
