= Filistea aureofasciata =

Scientific classification
- Kingdom: Animalia
- Phylum: Arthropoda
- Class: Insecta
- Order: Diptera
- Family: Tachinidae
- Subfamily: Exoristinae
- Tribe: Blondeliini
- Genus: Filistea
- Species: F. aureofasciata

Binomial name
- Filistea aureofasciata (Curran, 1927)

Synonyms
- Viviania aureofasciata Curran, 1927

Species of fly

Filistea aureofasciata is a species of fly in the family Tachinidae.

== Distribution ==
Cameroon, Congo, Nigeria, Uganda.
