= Filistea =

Scientific classification
- Kingdom: Animalia
- Phylum: Arthropoda
- Class: Insecta
- Order: Diptera
- Family: Tachinidae
- Subfamily: Exoristinae
- Tribe: Blondeliini
- Genus: Filistea; Cerretti & O’Hara, 2016

Type species
- Viviania aureofasciata Townsend, 1927

Genus of flies

Filistea is a genus of parasitic flies in the family Tachinidae.

== Species ==
- Filistea aureofasciata (Curran, 1927)
- Filistea verbekei Cerretti & O’Hara, 2016

== Distribution ==
Cameroon, Congo, Nigeria, Uganda.
