= Eomedina apicalis =

Scientific classification
- Kingdom: Animalia
- Phylum: Arthropoda
- Class: Insecta
- Order: Diptera
- Family: Tachinidae
- Subfamily: Exoristinae
- Tribe: Blondeliini
- Genus: Eomedina
- Species: E. apicalis

Binomial name
- Eomedina apicalis (Curran, 1927)

Synonyms
- Degeeria apicalis Curran, 1927; Eomedina grisescens Mesnil, 1960

Species of fly

Eomedina apicalis is a species of fly in the family Tachinidae.

== Distribution ==
D.R. Congo, Kenya, Nigeria, Sierra Leone, Tanzania, Uganda.
