= Eomedina =

Scientific classification
- Kingdom: Animalia
- Phylum: Arthropoda
- Class: Insecta
- Order: Diptera
- Family: Tachinidae
- Subfamily: Exoristinae
- Tribe: Blondeliini
- Genus: Eomedina; Mesnil, 1960

Type species
- Eomedina grisescens Mesnil, 1960

Genus of flies

Eomedina is a genus of bristle flies in the family Tachinidae.

== Species ==
- Eomedina apicalis (Curran, 1927)
- Eomedina hamoyensis Cerretti & Wyatt, 2006
