= Ischyrophaga =

Scientific classification
- Kingdom: Animalia
- Phylum: Arthropoda
- Class: Insecta
- Order: Diptera
- Family: Tachinidae
- Subfamily: Exoristinae
- Tribe: Blondeliini
- Genus: Ischyrophaga; Townsend, 1915

Type species
- Thelairodes ischyri Coquillett, 1905

Synonyms
- Pseudochaetona Townsend, 1919

Genus of flies

Ischyrophaga is a genus of parasitic flies in the family Tachinidae.

== Species ==
- Ischyrophaga ischyri (Coquillett, 1905)
- Ischyrophaga polita (Townsend, 1919)
