= Ischyrophaga ischyri =

Scientific classification
- Kingdom: Animalia
- Phylum: Arthropoda
- Class: Insecta
- Order: Diptera
- Family: Tachinidae
- Subfamily: Exoristinae
- Tribe: Blondeliini
- Genus: Ischyrophaga
- Species: I. ischyri

Binomial name
- Ischyrophaga ischyri (Coquillett, 1905)

Synonyms
- Thelairodes ischyri Coquillett, 1905

Species of fly

Ischyrophaga ischyri is a species of fly in the family Tachinidae.

== Distribution ==
Cuba.
