= Gymnoclytia immaculata =

Scientific classification
- Kingdom: Animalia
- Phylum: Arthropoda
- Class: Insecta
- Order: Diptera
- Family: Tachinidae
- Subfamily: Phasiinae
- Tribe: Gymnosomatini
- Genus: Gymnoclytia
- Species: G. immaculata

Binomial name
- Gymnoclytia immaculata Macquart, 1844

Synonyms
- Cistogaster immaculata Macquart, 1844; Cistogaster pallasii Townsend, 1891; Gymnoclytia ferruginea Townsend, 1934; Procistogaster ferruginea Townsend, 1934

Species of fly

Gymnoclytia immaculata is a North American species of tachinid flies in the genus Gymnoclytia of the family Tachinidae.

== Hosts ==
Larvae have been recorded from Pseudaletia unipuncta (Lepidoptera) and Euschistus variolarius (Hemiptera)

== Distribution ==
British Columbia to Quebec, United States & Mexico.
