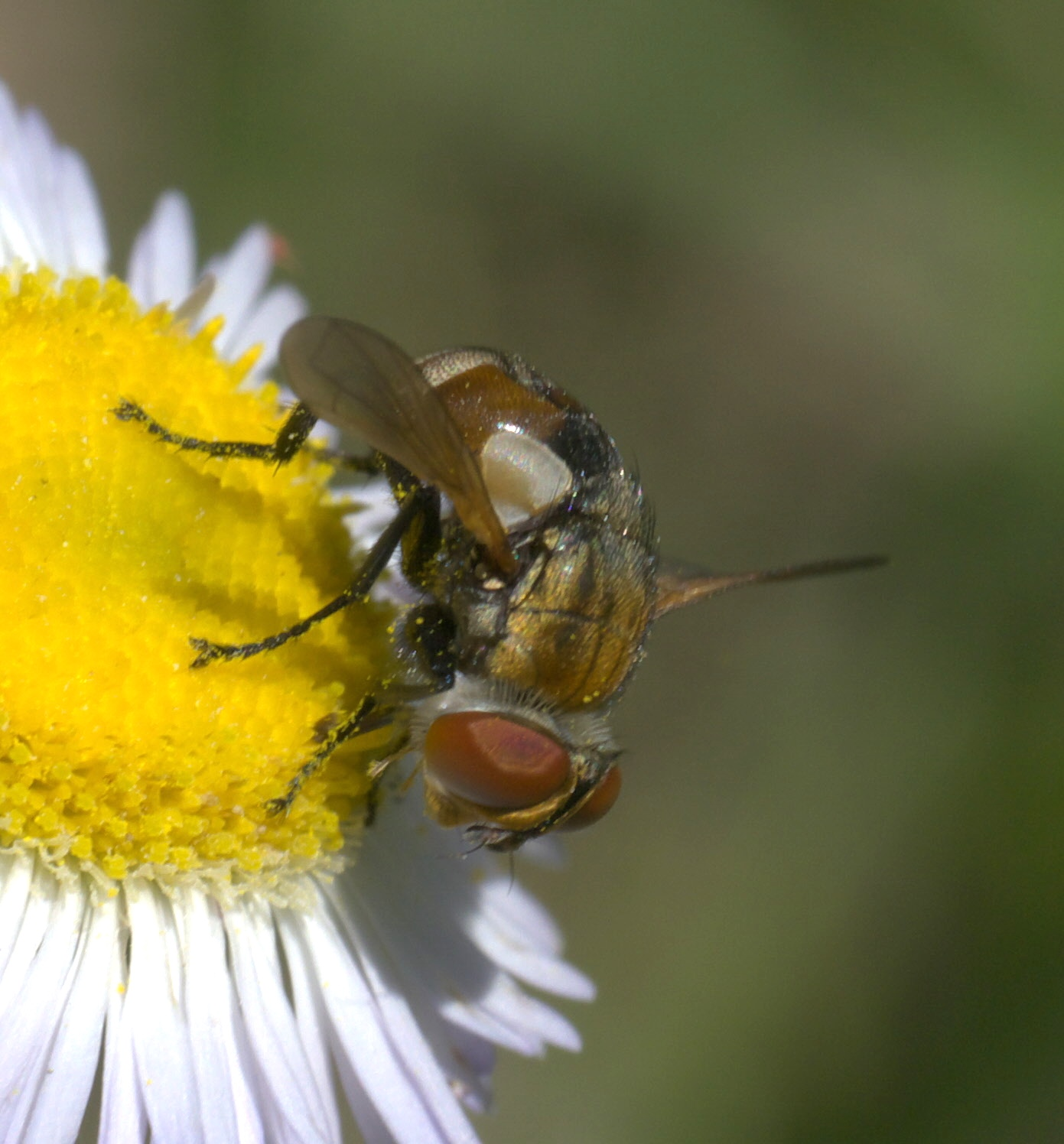
- Gymnoclytia occidua, Oklahoma

Scientific classification
- Kingdom: Animalia
- Phylum: Arthropoda
- Class: Insecta
- Order: Diptera
- Family: Tachinidae
- Subfamily: Phasiinae
- Tribe: Gymnosomatini
- Genus: Gymnoclytia
- Species: G. occidua

Binomial name
- Gymnoclytia occidua (Walker, 1849)

Synonyms
- Cistogaster divisa Loew, 1863; Eliozeta americana Brauer & von Berganstamm, 1891; Gymnosoma occidua Walker, 1849

= Gymnoclytia occidua =

Species of fly

Gymnoclytia occidua is a North American species of tachinid flies in the genus Gymnoclytia of the family Tachinidae.

== Hosts ==
Larvae have been recorded from Pieris protodice & Pieris rapae (Lepidoptera) and Euschistus variolarius (Hemiptera).

== Distribution ==
Michigan to Nova Scotia, southwest to Arizona, Mexico, and Georgia, Illinois to Virginia and Texas
