= Gymnoclytia paulista =

Scientific classification
- Kingdom: Animalia
- Phylum: Arthropoda
- Class: Insecta
- Order: Diptera
- Family: Tachinidae
- Subfamily: Phasiinae
- Tribe: Gymnosomatini
- Genus: Gymnoclytia
- Species: G. paulista

Binomial name
- Gymnoclytia paulista Townsend, 1929

Species of fly

Gymnoclytia paulista is a North American species of tachinid flies in the genus Gymnoclytia of the family Tachinidae.

== Distribution ==
Canada (British Columbia), United States (California, Northern Rockies, Pacific Northwest, Southwest).
