= Clytiomya continua =

Scientific classification
- Kingdom: Animalia
- Phylum: Arthropoda
- Clade: Pancrustacea
- Class: Insecta
- Order: Diptera
- Family: Tachinidae
- Subfamily: Phasiinae
- Tribe: Gymnosomatini
- Genus: Clytiomya
- Species: C. continua

Binomial name
- Clytiomya continua (Panzer, 1798)

Synonyms
- Musca continua Panzer, 1798; Clytia dalmatica Robineau-Desvoidy, 1830

Species of fly

Clytiomya continua is a European species of fly in the family Tachinidae. Hosts for the parasitoid larvae include Coreus marginatus orientalis, Eurygaster testudinaria, Eurydema gebleri, Eurydema dominulus, Graphosoma rubrolineatum, Homalogonia confusa, and Dolycoris baccarum. Larval development takes six to eleven days.

== Distribution ==
Turkmenistan, Uzbekistan, China, British Isles, Czech Republic, Hungary, Moldova, Poland, Romania, Slovakia, Ukraine, Bosnia and Herzegovina, Bulgaria, Croatia, Cyprus, Greece, Italy, Portugal, Serbia, Slovenia, Spain, Turkey, Austria, Belgium, France, Germany, Netherlands, Switzerland, Israel, Mongolia, Russia, Transcaucasia.
