= Acaulona costata =

Scientific classification
- Kingdom: Animalia
- Phylum: Arthropoda
- Clade: Pancrustacea
- Class: Insecta
- Order: Diptera
- Family: Tachinidae
- Subfamily: Phasiinae
- Tribe: Gymnosomatini
- Genus: Acaulona
- Species: A. costata

Binomial name
- Acaulona costata Wulp, 1888

Synonyms
- Forcipophasia fusca Townsend, 1935

Species of fly

Acaulona costata is a species of fly in the family Tachinidae.

== Distribution ==
Argentina, Brazil, Mexico.
