= Strongygaster globula =

Scientific classification
- Kingdom: Animalia
- Phylum: Arthropoda
- Class: Insecta
- Order: Diptera
- Family: Tachinidae
- Subfamily: Phasiinae
- Tribe: Strongygastrini
- Genus: Strongygaster
- Species: S. globula

Binomial name
- Strongygaster globula (Meigen, 1824)

Synonyms
- Tachina globula Meigen, 1824; Androphana grandis Brauer & von Berganstamm, 1889; Clytia villana Robineau-Desvoidy, 1863; Etheria pedicellata Robineau-Desvoidy, 1863; Musca lingens Meigen, 1975; Opesia occlusa Robineau-Desvoidy, 1863; Tamiclea cinerea Macquart, 1836; Xysta petiolata Strobl, 1880; Xysta testaceicornis Roser, 1840

Species of fly

Strongygaster globula is a species of bristle fly in the family Tachinidae.

== Distribution ==
Strongygaster globula is found in Czech Republic, Hungary, Poland, Romania, Slovakia, Ukraine, Bulgaria, Croatia, Italy, Slovenia, Spain, Austria, Belgium, France, Germany, Switzerland, Japan, Mongolia, Russia, Transcaucasia, and China.
