= Gymnoclytia minuta =

Scientific classification
- Kingdom: Animalia
- Phylum: Arthropoda
- Clade: Pancrustacea
- Class: Insecta
- Order: Diptera
- Family: Tachinidae
- Subfamily: Phasiinae
- Tribe: Gymnosomatini
- Genus: Gymnoclytia
- Species: G. minuta

Binomial name
- Gymnoclytia minuta Brooks, 1946

Species of fly

Gymnoclytia minuta is a North American species of tachinid flies in the genus Gymnoclytia of the family Tachinidae.

== Distribution ==
New Jersey, Virginia, Texas, Arkansas, Tennessee, Georgia, North Carolina, Rhode Island
