= Acaulona peruviana =

Scientific classification
- Kingdom: Animalia
- Phylum: Arthropoda
- Clade: Pancrustacea
- Class: Insecta
- Order: Diptera
- Family: Tachinidae
- Subfamily: Phasiinae
- Tribe: Gymnosomatini
- Genus: Acaulona
- Species: A. peruviana

Binomial name
- Acaulona peruviana Townsend, 1913

Species of fly

Acaulona peruviana is a species of fly in the family Tachinidae. It was first described by entomologist Charles Henry Tyler Townsend in 1913 based on specimens collected in Peru. It is a parasitoid of "cotton stainer" bugs. It was introduced to Puerto Rico in the early 1940s as a biocontrol agent of cotton stainers.

== Distribution ==
Brazil, Peru, Uruguay.
