= Acaulona erythropyga =

Scientific classification
- Kingdom: Animalia
- Phylum: Arthropoda
- Clade: Pancrustacea
- Class: Insecta
- Order: Diptera
- Family: Tachinidae
- Subfamily: Phasiinae
- Tribe: Gymnosomatini
- Genus: Acaulona
- Species: A. erythropyga

Binomial name
- Acaulona erythropyga Sabrosky, 1950

Species of fly

Acaulona erythropyga is a species of fly in the family Tachinidae.

== Distribution ==
Puerto Rico.
