= Xanthomelanodes flavipes =

Scientific classification
- Kingdom: Animalia
- Phylum: Arthropoda
- Clade: Pancrustacea
- Class: Insecta
- Order: Diptera
- Family: Tachinidae
- Subfamily: Phasiinae
- Tribe: Gymnosomatini
- Genus: Xanthomelanodes
- Species: X. flavipes

Binomial name
- Xanthomelanodes flavipes (Coquillett, 1897)

Synonyms
- Xanthomelana flavipes Coquillett, 1897

Species of fly

Xanthomelanodes flavipes is a species of bristle fly in the family Tachinidae.

== Distribution ==
It is found in Canada and the United States.
