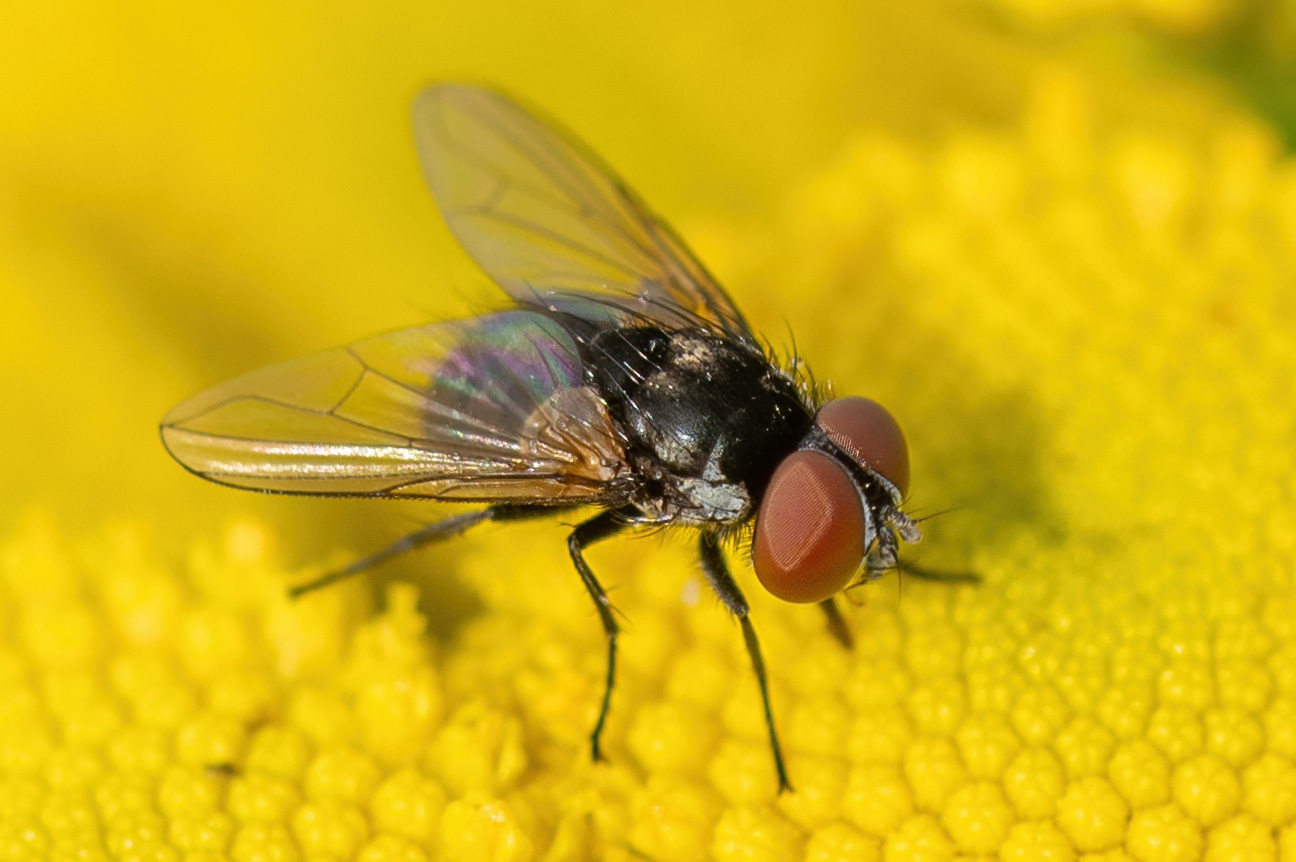

Scientific classification
- Kingdom: Animalia
- Phylum: Arthropoda
- Class: Insecta
- Order: Diptera
- Family: Tachinidae
- Subfamily: Phasiinae
- Tribe: Strongygastrini
- Genus: Strongygaster
- Species: S. celer

Binomial name
- Strongygaster celer (Meigen, 1838)

Synonyms
- Cistogaster celer Meigen, 1838; Eratia occlusa Robineau-Desvoidy, 1863; Phasia convexa Zetterstedt, 1844

= Strongygaster celer =

Species of fly

Strongygaster celer is a species of bristle fly in the family Tachinidae.

== Distribution ==
Czech Republic, Estonia, Hungary, Poland, Slovakia, Finland, Sweden, Greece, Italy, Portugal, Spain, Austria, France, Germany, Switzerland, Russia.
