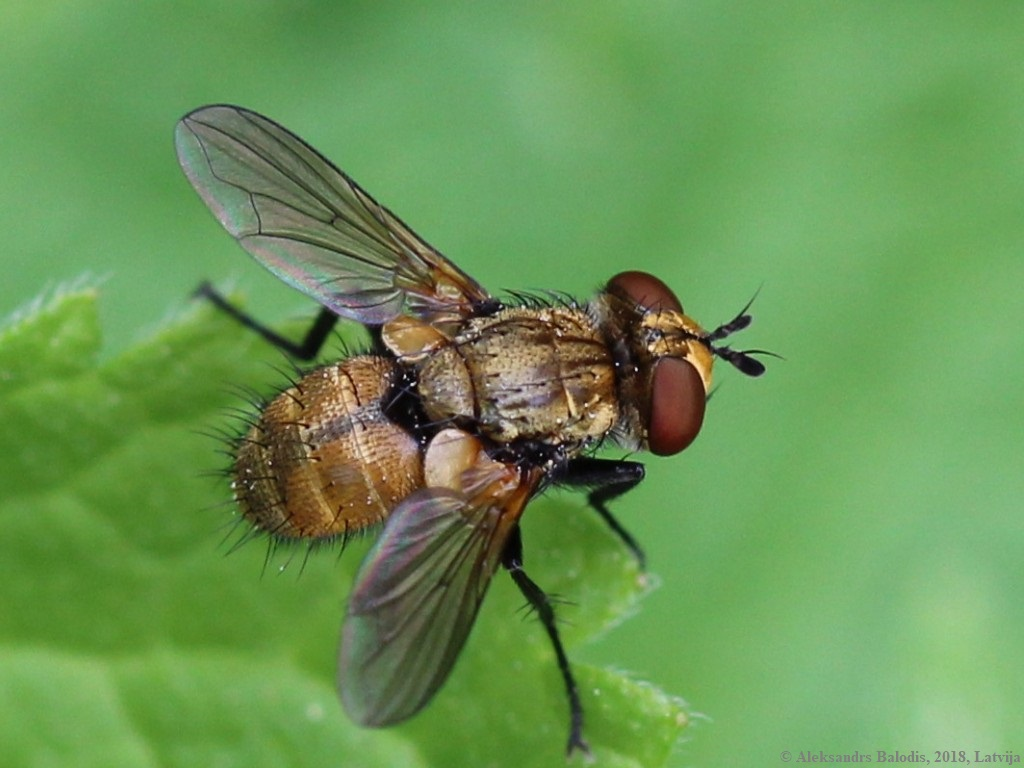

Scientific classification
- Kingdom: Animalia
- Phylum: Arthropoda
- Clade: Pancrustacea
- Class: Insecta
- Order: Diptera
- Family: Tachinidae
- Subfamily: Phasiinae
- Tribe: Gymnosomatini
- Genus: Eliozeta
- Species: E. pellucens

Binomial name
- Eliozeta pellucens (Fallén, 1820)

Synonyms
- Clytia auriceps Macquart, 1854; Clytia fumipennis Zetterstedt, 1859; Clytia macrocera Macquart, 1835; Tachina fumipennis Zetterstedt, 1859; Tachina pellucens Fallén, 1820; Tachina segonax Walker, 1849

= Eliozeta pellucens =

Species of fly

Eliozeta pellucens is a European species of fly in the family Tachinidae.

== Distribution ==
Czech Republic, Hungary, Moldova, Poland, Romania, Slovakia, Ukraine, Denmark, Finland, Sweden, Andorra, Bulgaria, Greece, Italy, Macedonia, Portugal, Spain, Turkey, Austria, Belgium, France, Germany, Netherlands, Switzerland, Iran, Russia, China, Transcaucasia.
