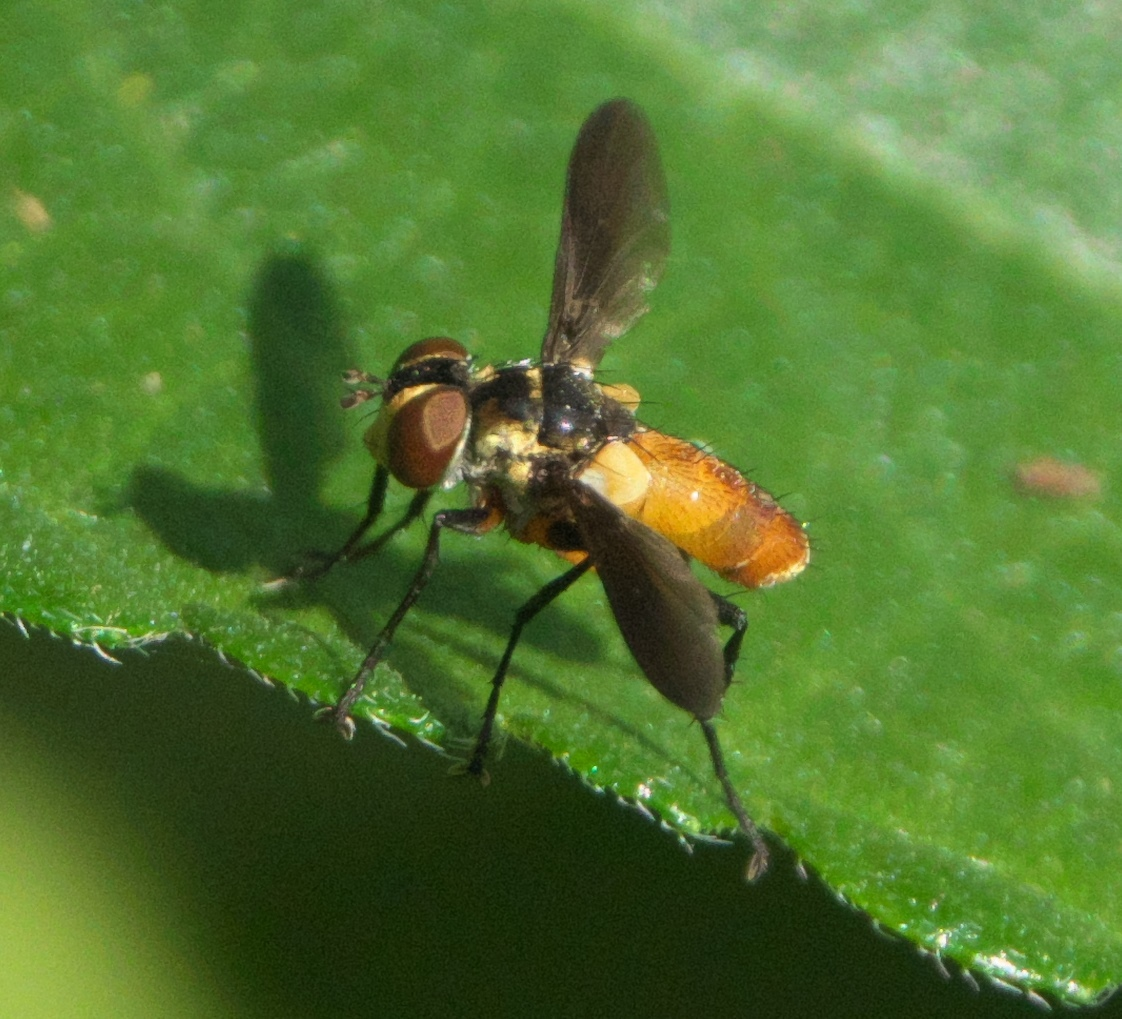
- Xanthomelanodes atripennis, Oklahoma

Scientific classification
- Kingdom: Animalia
- Phylum: Arthropoda
- Class: Insecta
- Order: Diptera
- Family: Tachinidae
- Subfamily: Phasiinae
- Tribe: Gymnosomatini
- Genus: Xanthomelanodes
- Species: X. atripennis

Binomial name
- Xanthomelanodes atripennis (Say, 1829)

Synonyms
- Erythrophasia atripennis Townsend, 1917; Phasia atripennis Say, 1829; Tachina corythus Walker, 1849; Wahlbergia atripennis Townsend, 1891

= Xanthomelanodes atripennis =

Species of fly

Xanthomelanodes atripennis is a species of bristle fly in the family Tachinidae.

== Distribution ==
United States, Mexico.
