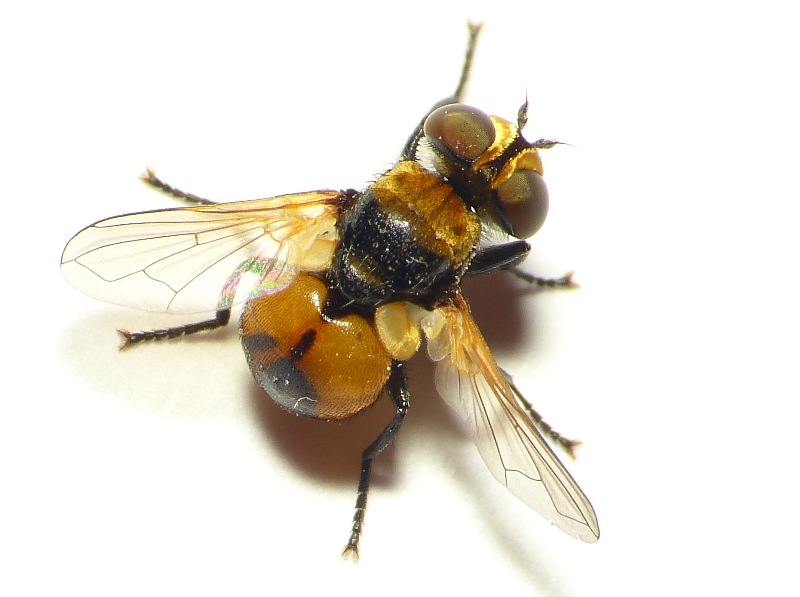
- Cistogaster globosa Netherlands

Scientific classification
- Kingdom: Animalia
- Phylum: Arthropoda
- Clade: Pancrustacea
- Class: Insecta
- Order: Diptera
- Family: Tachinidae
- Subfamily: Phasiinae
- Tribe: Gymnosomatini
- Genus: Cistogaster
- Species: C. globosa

Binomial name
- Cistogaster globosa (Fabricius, 1775)5

Synonyms
- Syrphus globosa Fabricius, 1775; Gymnosoma aurantiaca Meigen, 1824

= Cistogaster globosa =

Species of fly

Cistogaster globosa is a European species of fly in the family Tachinidae.

== Distribution ==
Europe, Russia, Transcaucasia, Kazakhstan, Mongolia.
