= Xanthomelanodes californicus =

Scientific classification
- Kingdom: Animalia
- Phylum: Arthropoda
- Class: Insecta
- Order: Diptera
- Family: Tachinidae
- Subfamily: Phasiinae
- Tribe: Gymnosomatini
- Genus: Xanthomelanodes
- Species: X. californicus

Binomial name
- Xanthomelanodes californicus Townsend, 1908

Species of fly

Xanthomelanodes californicus is a species of bristle fly in the family Tachinidae.

== Distribution ==
Canada, United States, Mexico.
