= Catharosia nebulosa =

Scientific classification
- Kingdom: Animalia
- Phylum: Arthropoda
- Class: Insecta
- Order: Diptera
- Family: Tachinidae
- Subfamily: Phasiinae
- Tribe: Catharosiini
- Genus: Catharosia
- Species: C. nebulosa

Binomial name
- Catharosia nebulosa (Coquillett, 1897)

Synonyms
- Sciasma nebulosa Coquillett, 1897

Species of fly

Catharosia nebulosa is a species of bristle fly in the family Tachinidae.

== Distribution ==
United States, Puerto Rico.
