= Arcona =

Arcona may refer to:

- Cape Arkona, a cape on the island of Rügen, Germany
- Arcona, an alien race in Star Wars
- Arcona, a genus of fly.

== Ships ==
- Cap Arcona, a German ship sunk in 1945
- SMS Arcona, three ships of the German/Prussian navies
- Arcona-class frigate, a class of vessels originally of the Prussian Navy
