= Clytiomya sola =

Scientific classification
- Kingdom: Animalia
- Phylum: Arthropoda
- Clade: Pancrustacea
- Class: Insecta
- Order: Diptera
- Family: Tachinidae
- Subfamily: Phasiinae
- Tribe: Gymnosomatini
- Genus: Clytiomya
- Species: C. sola

Binomial name
- Clytiomya sola (Rondani, 1861)

Synonyms
- Phasia sola Rondani, 1861; Clytiomya dalmatica Villeneuve, 1931; Clytia latifrons Strobl, 1893

Species of fly

Clytiomya sola is a European species of fly in the family Tachinidae. The species is a parasitoid of Dolycoris baccarum and Graphosoma lineatum bugs.

== Distribution ==
Hungary, Ukraine, Albania, Bulgaria, Croatia, Cyprus, Greece, Italy, Portugal, Spain, Turkey, France, Switzerland, Iran, Israel, Palestine, Transcaucasia.
