= Gymnoclytia unicolor =

Scientific classification
- Kingdom: Animalia
- Phylum: Arthropoda
- Class: Insecta
- Order: Diptera
- Family: Tachinidae
- Subfamily: Phasiinae
- Tribe: Gymnosomatini
- Genus: Gymnoclytia
- Species: G. ferruginosa

Binomial name
- Gymnoclytia ferruginosa Brooks, 1946

Synonyms
- Procistogaster unicolor Brooks, 1946

Species of fly

Gymnoclytia unicolor is a North American species of tachinid flies in the genus Gymnoclytia of the family Tachinidae.

== Distribution ==
California, Utah, Texas, Arkansas, North Carolina, Florida & Michigan
