= Xanthomelanodes brasiliensis =

Scientific classification
- Kingdom: Animalia
- Phylum: Arthropoda
- Clade: Pancrustacea
- Class: Insecta
- Order: Diptera
- Family: Tachinidae
- Subfamily: Phasiinae
- Tribe: Gymnosomatini
- Genus: Xanthomelanodes
- Species: X. brasiliensis

Binomial name
- Xanthomelanodes brasiliensis Townsend, 1929

Species of fly

Xanthomelanodes brasiliensis is a species of bristle fly in the family Tachinidae.

== Distribution ==
Brazil.
