= Gymnoclytia occidentalis =

Scientific classification
- Kingdom: Animalia
- Phylum: Arthropoda
- Class: Insecta
- Order: Diptera
- Family: Tachinidae
- Subfamily: Phasiinae
- Tribe: Gymnosomatini
- Genus: Gymnoclytia
- Species: G. occidentalis

Binomial name
- Gymnoclytia occidentalis Townsend, 1908

Species of fly

Gymnoclytia occidentalis is a North American species of tachinid flies in the genus Gymnoclytia of the family Tachinidae.

== Distribution ==
British Columbia, Idaho, California, Utah, Colorado, New Mexico and Washington
