= Gymnoclytia griseonigra =

Scientific classification
- Kingdom: Animalia
- Phylum: Arthropoda
- Class: Insecta
- Order: Diptera
- Family: Tachinidae
- Subfamily: Phasiinae
- Tribe: Gymnosomatini
- Genus: Gymnoclytia
- Species: G. griseonigra

Binomial name
- Gymnoclytia griseonigra (Wulp, 1892)

Synonyms
- Cistogaster griseonigra Wulp, 1892

Species of fly

Gymnoclytia griseonigra is a North American species of tachinid flies in the genus Gymnoclytia of the family Tachinidae.

== Distribution ==
Mexico.
