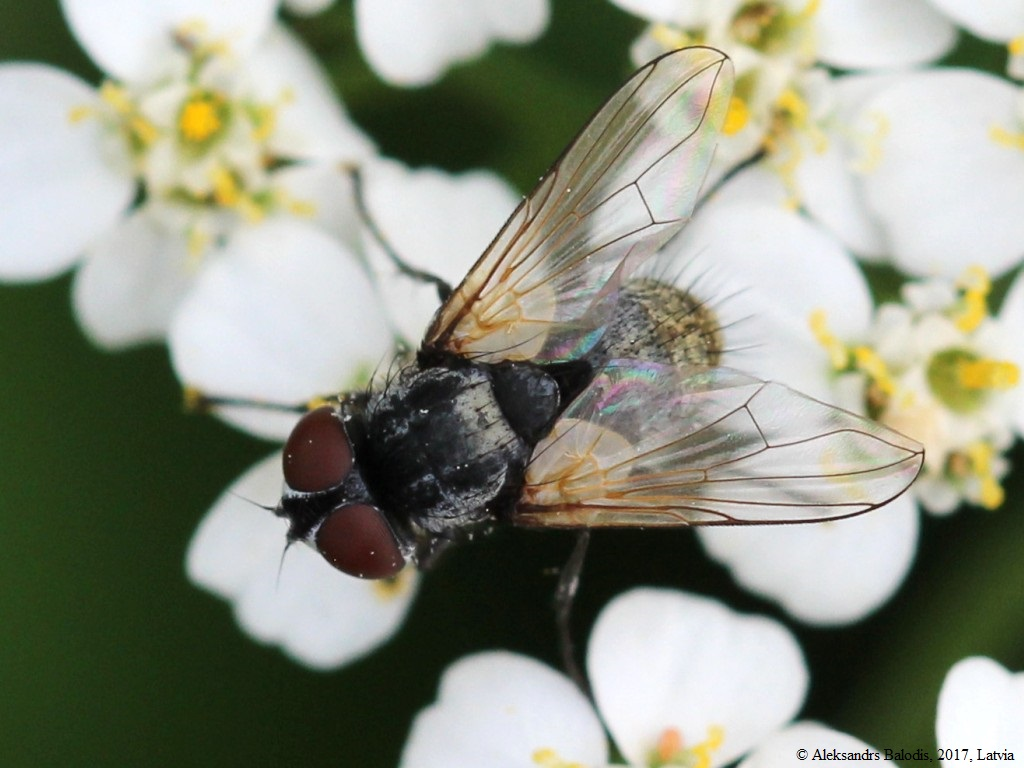
- Strongygaster triangulifera

Scientific classification
- Kingdom: Animalia
- Phylum: Arthropoda
- Class: Insecta
- Order: Diptera
- Family: Tachinidae
- Subfamily: Phasiinae
- Tribe: Strongygastrini
- Genus: Strongygaster
- Species: S. triangulifera

Binomial name
- Strongygaster triangulifera (Loew, 1863)

Synonyms
- Hyalomyia triangulifer Loew, 1863; Hyalomyodes weedii Townsend, 1893

= Strongygaster triangulifera =

Species of fly

Strongygaster triangulifera is a species of bristle fly in the family Tachinidae. It is a generalist parasitoid of adult insects, including Coleoptera from over 10 families, as well as Dermaptera, Hemiptera, Lepidoptera, and Orthoptera.

== Distribution ==
Canada, United States, Mexico, Argentina, Chile
