= Gymnoclytia hirticollis =

Scientific classification
- Kingdom: Animalia
- Phylum: Arthropoda
- Class: Insecta
- Order: Diptera
- Family: Tachinidae
- Subfamily: Phasiinae
- Tribe: Gymnosomatini
- Genus: Gymnoclytia
- Species: G. hirticollis

Binomial name
- Gymnoclytia hirticollis (Wulp, 1892)

Synonyms
- Cistogaster hirticollis Wulp, 1892

Species of fly

Gymnoclytia hirticollis is a North American species of tachinid flies in the genus Gymnoclytia of the family Tachinidae .
