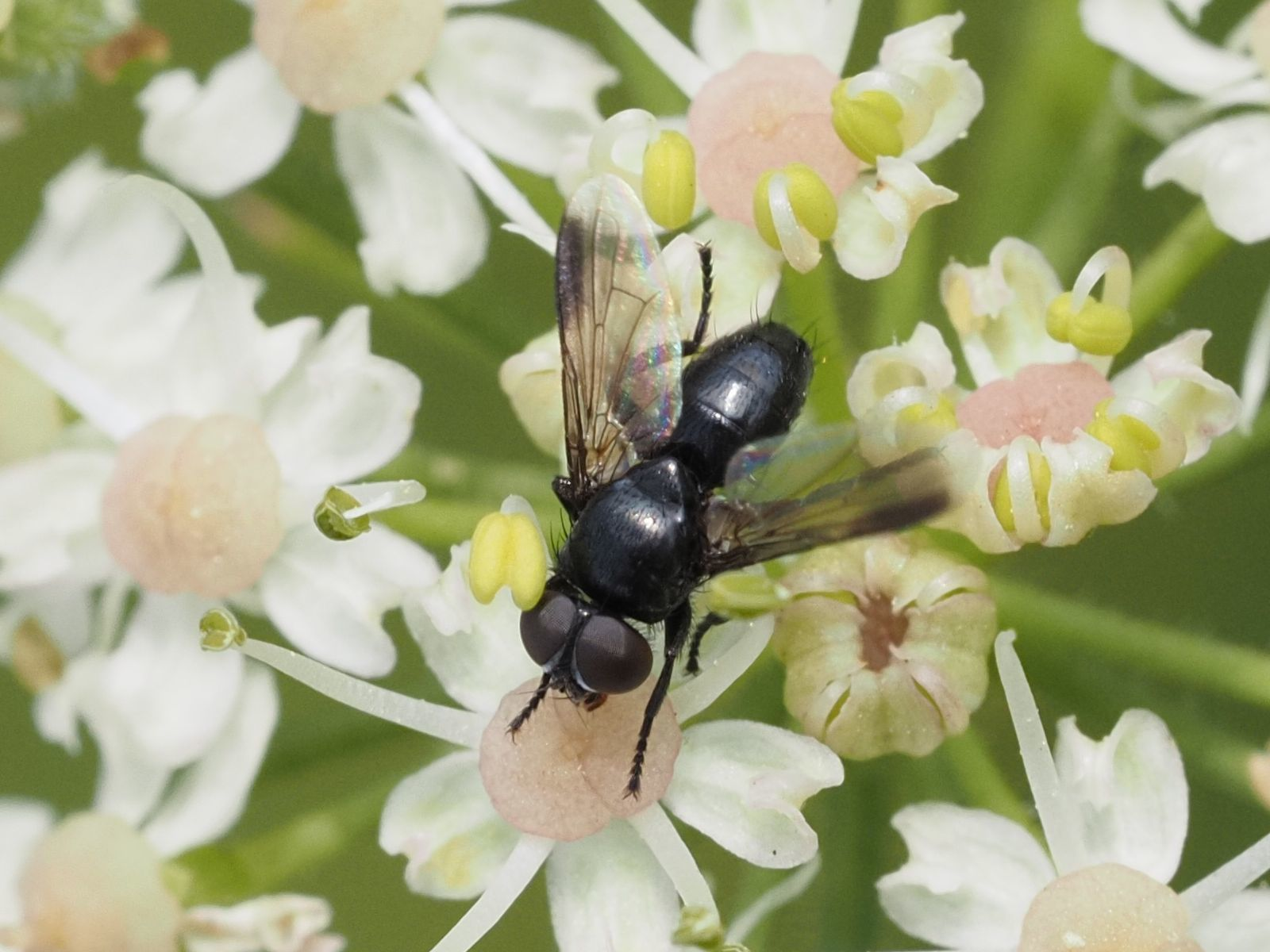
- Catharosia pygmaea, Austria

Scientific classification
- Kingdom: Animalia
- Phylum: Arthropoda
- Class: Insecta
- Order: Diptera
- Family: Tachinidae
- Subfamily: Phasiinae
- Tribe: Catharosiini
- Genus: Catharosia
- Species: C. pygmaea

Binomial name
- Catharosia pygmaea (Fallén, 1815)

Synonyms
- Thereva pygmaea Fallén, 1815; Thereva nana Fallén, 1815; Tachina limbata Meigen, 1824; Leucostoma nigrisquama Zetterstedt, 1859; Peleteria sordida Aldrich, 1934

= Catharosia pygmaea =

Species of fly

Catharosia pygmaea is a species of bristle fly in the family Tachinidae.

== Distribution ==
British Isles, Czech Republic, Estonia, Hungary, Lithuania, Poland, Romania, Ukraine, Denmark, Finland, Norway, Sweden, Andorra, Bulgaria, Croatia, Greece, Italy, Malta, Portugal, Slovenia, Spain, Turkey, Austria, Belgium, France, Germany, Netherlands, Switzerland, Iran, Israel, Palestine, Mongolia, Russia, Transcaucasia.
