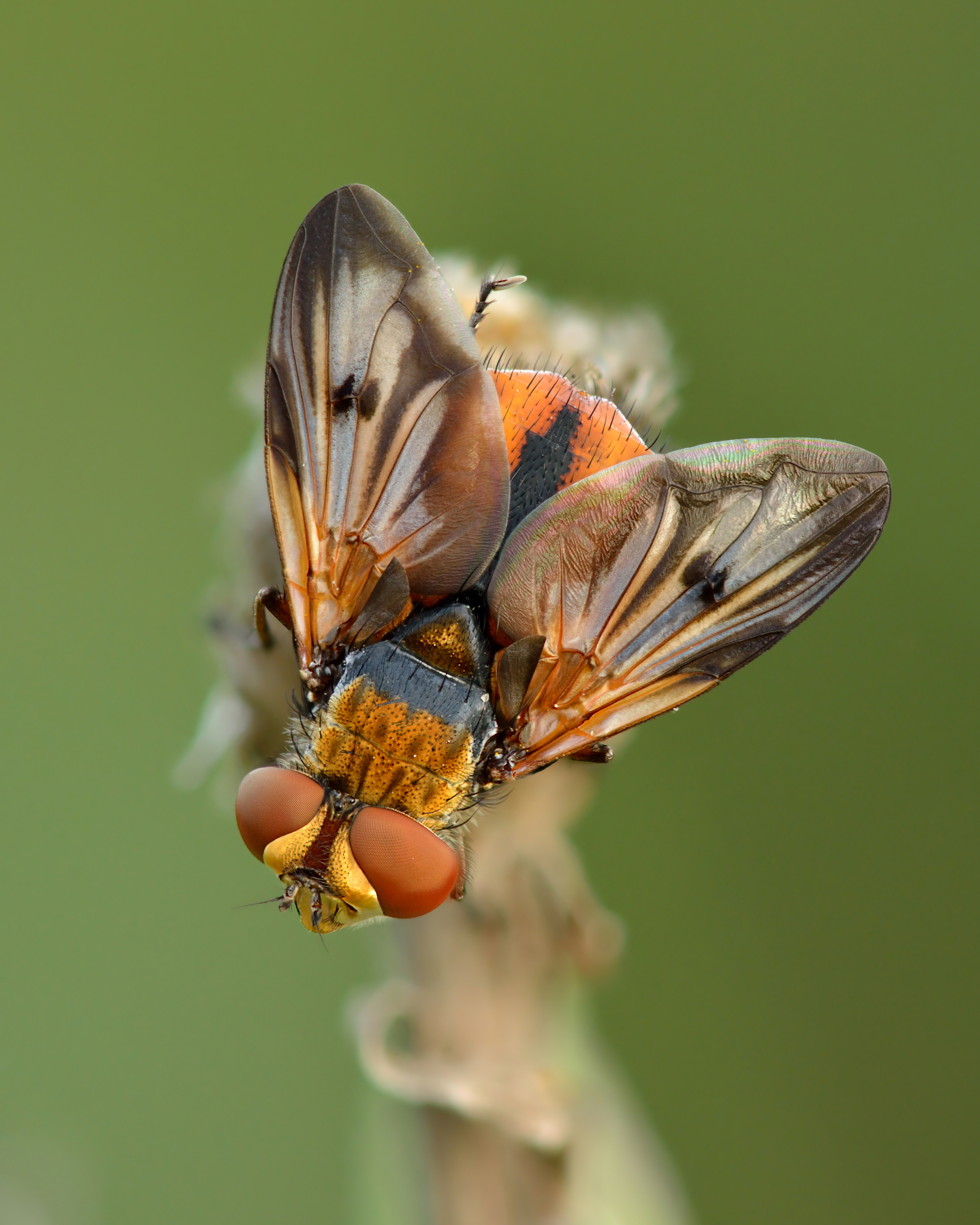
- Ectophasia crassipennis, male
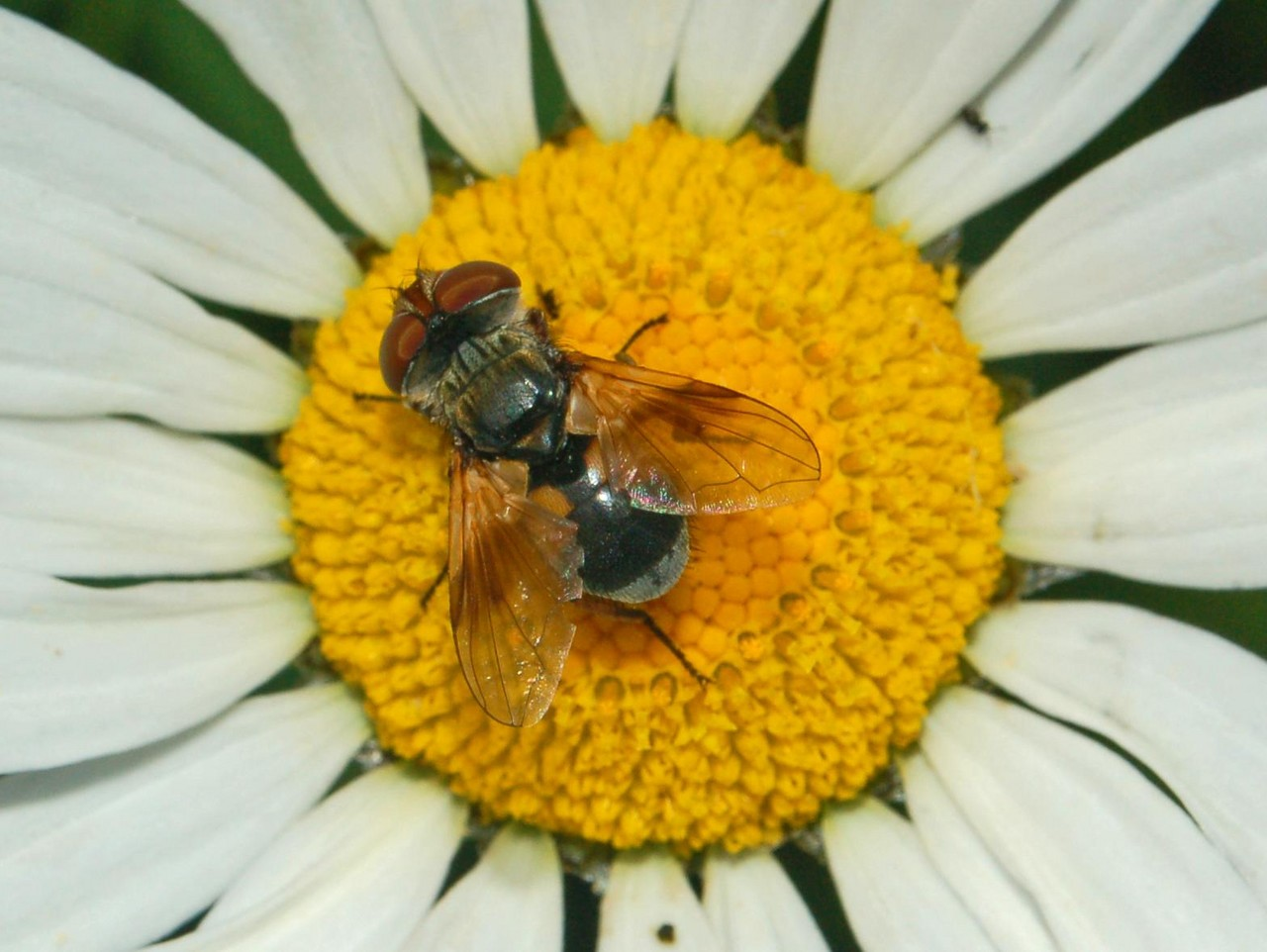
- Ectophasia crassipennis, female

Scientific classification
- Kingdom: Animalia
- Phylum: Arthropoda
- Clade: Pancrustacea
- Class: Insecta
- Order: Diptera
- Family: Tachinidae
- Genus: Ectophasia
- Species: E. crassipennis

Binomial name
- Ectophasia crassipennis (Fabricius, 1794)

Synonyms
- Syrphus crassipennis Fabricius, 1794; Phasia crassipennis (Fabricius, 1794); Phasia nigra Robineau-Desvoidy, 1830

= Ectophasia crassipennis =

Species of fly

Ectophasia crassipennis is a species of parasitic fly in the subfamily Phasiinae of the family Tachinidae.

== Description ==
Adults of Ectophasia crassipennis can reach a length of about 5–9 millimetres (0.20–0.35 in) and exhibit considerable variability in coloration, ranging from blackish to orange-brownish hues. Their large compound eyes are reddish. Notably, the species boasts a broad, flattened abdomen with ventrally folded sternite 7, while its large wings have wide brownish or greyish dots and the cell R5 is opened at the edge. Distinguishing Ectophasia crassipennis from its similar counterpart, Ectophasia oblonga, can pose a challenge due to their morphological similarities.

== Distribution ==
This fly is present in Southern Europe and warmer parts of Central Europe, where it thrives in diverse habitats. It also occurs in Asia in Russia, Japan, and China.

== Biology ==
These flies can mostly be encountered from early August through late September feeding on nectar of flowers (especially of Apiaceae and Asteraceae species).

The larvae are parasitic of Hemiptera (Pentatomidae, Acanthosomatidae, Coreidae and Lygaeidae species).

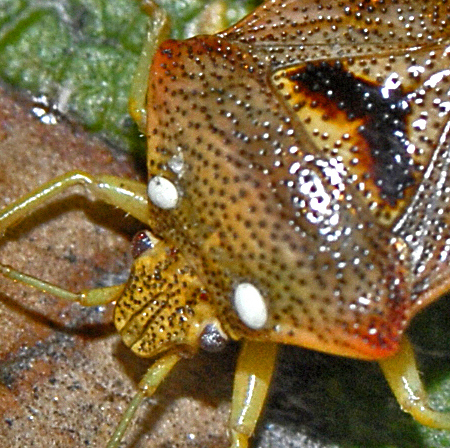
Eggs of Ectophasia crassipennis on Elasmucha grisea

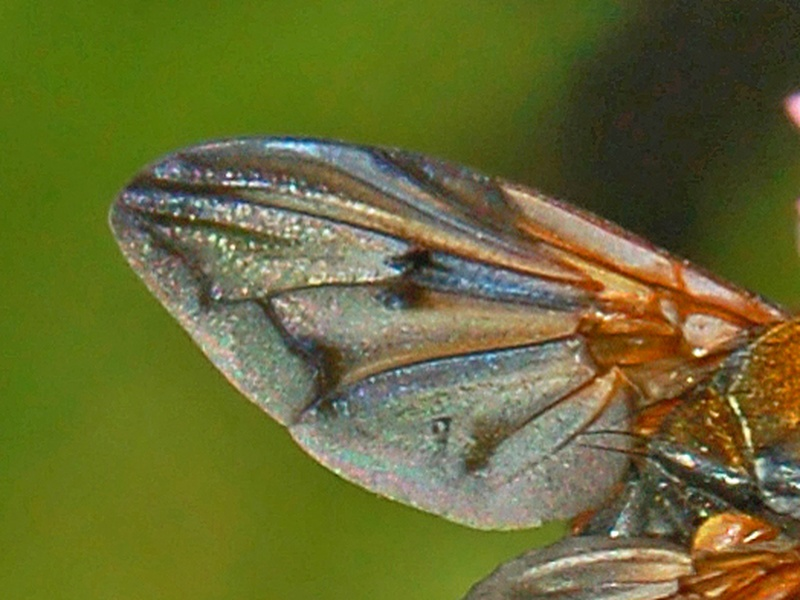
Ectophasia crassipennis, close-up on a wing with detail of veins
