= Leverella =

Scientific classification
- Kingdom: Animalia
- Phylum: Arthropoda
- Class: Insecta
- Order: Diptera
- Family: Tachinidae
- Subfamily: Phasiinae
- Tribe: Zitini
- Genus: Leverella; Baranov, 1934

Type species
- Leverella institutiimperialis Baranov, 1934

Genus of flies

Leverella is a genus of flies in the family Tachinidae.

== Species ==
- Leverella institutiimperialis Baranov, 1934
- Leverella novaeguineae Baranov, 1934
