= Technamyia =

Scientific classification
- Kingdom: Animalia
- Phylum: Arthropoda
- Class: Insecta
- Order: Diptera
- Family: Tachinidae
- Subfamily: Phasiinae
- Tribe: Gymnosomatini
- Genus: Technamyia; Reinhard, 1975

Type species
- Technamyia cinereola Reinhard, 1975

Genus of flies

Technamyia is a genus of flies in the family Tachinidae.

== Species ==
- Technamyia cinereola Reinhard, 1975

== Distribution ==
Mexico.
