= Dallasimyia =

Scientific classification
- Kingdom: Animalia
- Phylum: Arthropoda
- Class: Insecta
- Order: Diptera
- Family: Tachinidae
- Subfamily: Phasiinae
- Tribe: Gymnosomatini
- Genus: Dallasimyia; Blanchard, 1944

Type species
- Dallasimyia bosqi Blanchard, 1944

Genus of flies

Dallasimyia is a genus of flies in the family Tachinidae.

== Species ==
- Dallasimyia bosqi Blanchard, 1944

== Distribution ==
Argentina.
