= Eutrichopoda =

Scientific classification
- Kingdom: Animalia
- Phylum: Arthropoda
- Class: Insecta
- Order: Diptera
- Family: Tachinidae
- Subfamily: Phasiinae
- Tribe: Gymnosomatini
- Genus: Eutrichopoda; Townsend, 1908

Type species
- Eutrichopoda nigra Townsend, 1908

Genus of flies

Eutrichopoda is a genus of flies in the family Tachinidae.

== Species ==
- Eutrichopoda abdominalis Townsend, 1929
- Eutrichopoda flavipenna Dios & Nihei, 2016
- Eutrichopoda melanopus (Robineau-Desvoidy, 1830)
- Eutrichopoda nigra Townsend, 1908
- Eutrichopoda nitidiventris (Wulp, 1892)
- Eutrichopoda pyrrhogaster (Wiedemann, 1830)
- Eutrichopoda tegulata (Townsend, 1897)
