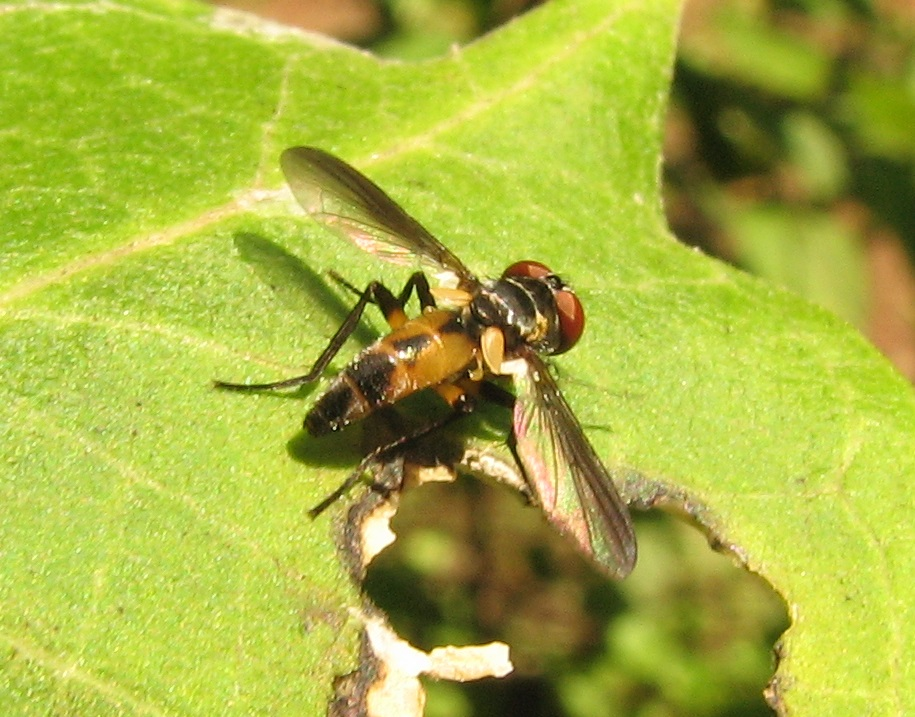

Scientific classification
- Kingdom: Animalia
- Phylum: Arthropoda
- Clade: Pancrustacea
- Class: Insecta
- Order: Diptera
- Family: Tachinidae
- Subfamily: Phasiinae
- Tribe: Gymnosomatini
- Genus: Xanthomelanodes; Townsend, 1892

Type species
- Xanthomelana gracilentus Wulp, 1892

Synonyms
- Xanthomelana Wulp, 1892; Erythrophasia Townsend, 1917

= Xanthomelanodes =

Genus of flies

Xanthomelanodes is a genus of parasitoid flies in the family Tachinidae, comprising 13 described species. Like all members of the subfamily Phasiinae, the larvae are endoparasitoids of true bugs (Heteroptera), developing inside their hosts and ultimately killing them.

The tribe Gymnosomatini, to which Xanthomelanodes belongs, comprises flies specialised as parasitoids of true bugs in the order Hemiptera, particularly Heteroptera.

The genus name Xanthomelana Wulp, 1892, listed as a synonym, was the original name under which the type species was described; Xanthomelanodes was erected by Townsend in 1892 as a replacement name, as Xanthomelana had already been used elsewhere.

== Species ==
- Xanthomelanodes arcuatus (Say, 1829)
- Xanthomelanodes atrifrons (Wiedemann, 1824)
- Xanthomelanodes atripennis (Say, 1829)
- Xanthomelanodes brasiliensis Townsend, 1929
- Xanthomelanodes californicus Townsend, 1908
- Xanthomelanodes diaphanus (Fabricius, 1805)
- Xanthomelanodes dorsalis (Wulp, 1892)
- Xanthomelanodes flavipes (Coquillett, 1897)
- Xanthomelanodes gracilentus (Wulp, 1892)
- Xanthomelanodes mutatus (Wiedemann, 1830)
- Xanthomelanodes pictipes (Bigot, 1889)
- Xanthomelanodes rubicundus (Wulp, 1892)
- Xanthomelanodes trivitatus Reinhard, 1955
