= Clytiomya =

Scientific classification
- Kingdom: Animalia
- Phylum: Arthropoda
- Class: Insecta
- Order: Diptera
- Family: Tachinidae
- Subfamily: Phasiinae
- Tribe: Gymnosomatini
- Genus: Clytiomya; Rondani, 1861

Type species
- Musca continua Panzer, 1798

Synonyms
- Clitiomya Rondani, 1862; Clytiomyia Rondani, 1862; Clytiophasia Dupuis, 1950

Genus of flies

Clytiomya is a genus of flies in the family Tachinidae.

== Species ==
- Clytiomya continua (Panzer, 1798)
- Clytiomya dupuisi Kugler, 1971
- Clytiomya mesnili Kugler, 1968
- Clytiomya sola (Rondani, 1861)
