= Acaulona =

Scientific classification
- Kingdom: Animalia
- Phylum: Arthropoda
- Clade: Pancrustacea
- Class: Insecta
- Order: Diptera
- Family: Tachinidae
- Subfamily: Phasiinae
- Tribe: Gymnosomatini
- Genus: Acaulona; Wulp, 1888

Type species
- Acaulona costata Wulp, 1888

Synonyms
- Forcipophasia Townsend, 1935

Genus of flies

Acaulona is a genus of flies in the family Tachinidae.

== Species ==
- Acaulona brasiliana Townsend, 1937
- Acaulona costata Wulp, 1888
- Acaulona erythropyga Sabrosky, 1950
- Acaulona peruviana Townsend, 1913
