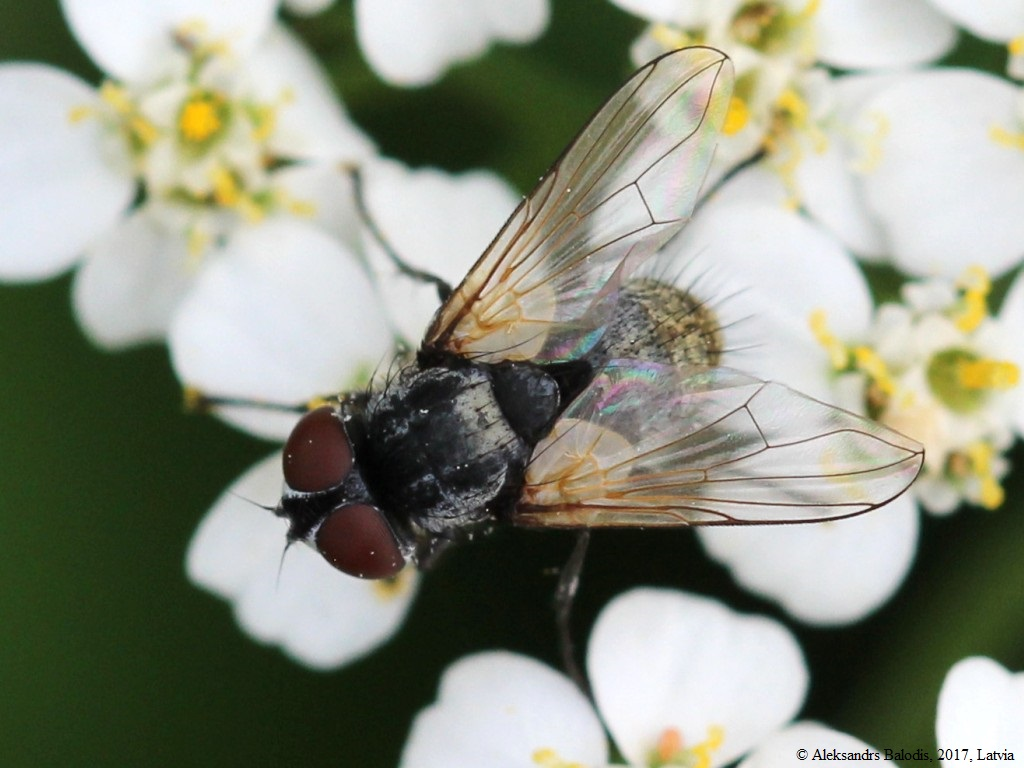
- Image of Strongygaster

Scientific classification
- Kingdom: Animalia
- Phylum: Arthropoda
- Class: Insecta
- Order: Diptera
- Family: Tachinidae
- Subfamily: Phasiinae
- Tribe: Strongygastrini
- Genus: Strongygaster; Macquart, 1834

Synonyms
- Clistomorpha Townsend, 1892; Cristoforia Rondani, 1868; Eratia Robineau-Desvoidy, 1863; Etheria Robineau-Desvoidy, 1863; Hyalomyiodes Bezzi, 1907; Hyalomyodes Townsend, 1893; Strongigaster Rondani, 1868; Strongylogaster Blanchard, 1840; Tamiclea Macquart, 1836

= Strongygaster =

Genus of flies

Strongygaster is a genus of flies in the family Tachinidae.

== Species ==
- Strongygaster argentinensis (Blanchard, 1942)
- Strongygaster brasiliensis (Townsend, 1929)
- Strongygaster californica (Townsend, 1908)
- Strongygaster celer (Meigen, 1838)
- Strongygaster didyma (Loew, 1863)
- Strongygaster globula (Meigen, 1824)
- Strongygaster nishijimai Mesnil, 1957
- Strongygaster robusta (Townsend, 1908)
- Strongygaster triangulifera (Loew, 1863)
- Strongygaster vernalis (Robineau-Desvoidy, 1863)
