= Homogenia =

Scientific classification
- Kingdom: Animalia
- Phylum: Arthropoda
- Clade: Pancrustacea
- Class: Insecta
- Order: Diptera
- Family: Tachinidae
- Subfamily: Phasiinae
- Tribe: Gymnosomatini
- Genus: Homogenia; Wulp, 1892

Synonyms
- Eumogenia Curran, 1934; Euomogenia Townsend, 1908; Trichopododes Townsend, 1893

Genus of flies

Homogenia is a genus of flies in the family Tachinidae.

== Species ==
- Homogenia apicalis (Wiedemann, 1830)
- Homogenia bicolor (Bigot, 1876)
- Homogenia decisa (Walker, 1853)
- Homogenia dysderci (Townsend, 1937)
- Homogenia inconstans (Wiedemann, 1830)
- Homogenia lacteata (Townsend, 1908)
- Homogenia latipennis Wulp, 1892
- Homogenia luteipennis (Wiedemann, 1830)
- Homogenia nigripennis (Bigot, 1876)
- Homogenia nigroscutellata Wulp, 1892
- Homogenia rufipes Wulp, 1892
