= Brasilomyia =

Scientific classification
- Kingdom: Animalia
- Phylum: Arthropoda
- Class: Insecta
- Order: Diptera
- Family: Tachinidae
- Subfamily: Phasiinae
- Tribe: Gymnosomatini
- Genus: Brasilomyia; Özdikmen, 2010

Type species
- Platyphasia similis Townsend, 1935

Synonyms
- Platyphasia Townsend, 1935

Genus of flies

Brasilomyia is a genus of flies in the family Tachinidae.

== Species ==
- Brasilomyia similis (Townsend, 1935)

== Distribution ==
Brazil.
