= Hermyini =

Scientific classification
- Kingdom: Animalia
- Phylum: Arthropoda
- Class: Insecta
- Order: Diptera
- Family: Tachinidae
- Subfamily: Phasiinae
- Tribe: Hermyini

Tribe of flies

Hermyini is a tribe of flies in the family Tachinidae.

== Genera ==
- Formicophania Townsend, 1916
- Hermya Robineau-Desvoidy, 1830
- Paraclara Bezzi, 1908
- Penthosia Wulp, 1892
- Penthosiosoma Townsend, 1926
