= Xanthomelanopsis =

Scientific classification
- Kingdom: Animalia
- Phylum: Arthropoda
- Class: Insecta
- Order: Diptera
- Family: Tachinidae
- Subfamily: Phasiinae
- Tribe: Gymnosomatini
- Genus: Xanthomelanopsis; Townsend, 1917

Type species
- Xanthomelanodes peruanus Townsend, 1911

Genus of flies

Xanthomelanopsis is a genus of flies in the family Tachinidae.

== Species ==
- Xanthomelanopsis articulata (Wulp, 1892)
- Xanthomelanopsis brasiliensis Townsend, 1917
- Xanthomelanopsis peruana (Townsend, 1911)
- Xanthomelanopsis trigonalis (Wulp, 1892)
