= Atrichiopoda =

Scientific classification
- Kingdom: Animalia
- Phylum: Arthropoda
- Class: Insecta
- Order: Diptera
- Family: Tachinidae
- Subfamily: Phasiinae
- Tribe: Gymnosomatini
- Genus: Atrichiopoda; Townsend, 1931

Type species
- Atrichiopoda oviventris Townsend, 1931

Genus of flies

Atrichiopoda is a genus of flies in the family Tachinidae.

== Species ==
- Atrichiopoda oviventris Townsend, 1931

== Distribution ==
Peru.
