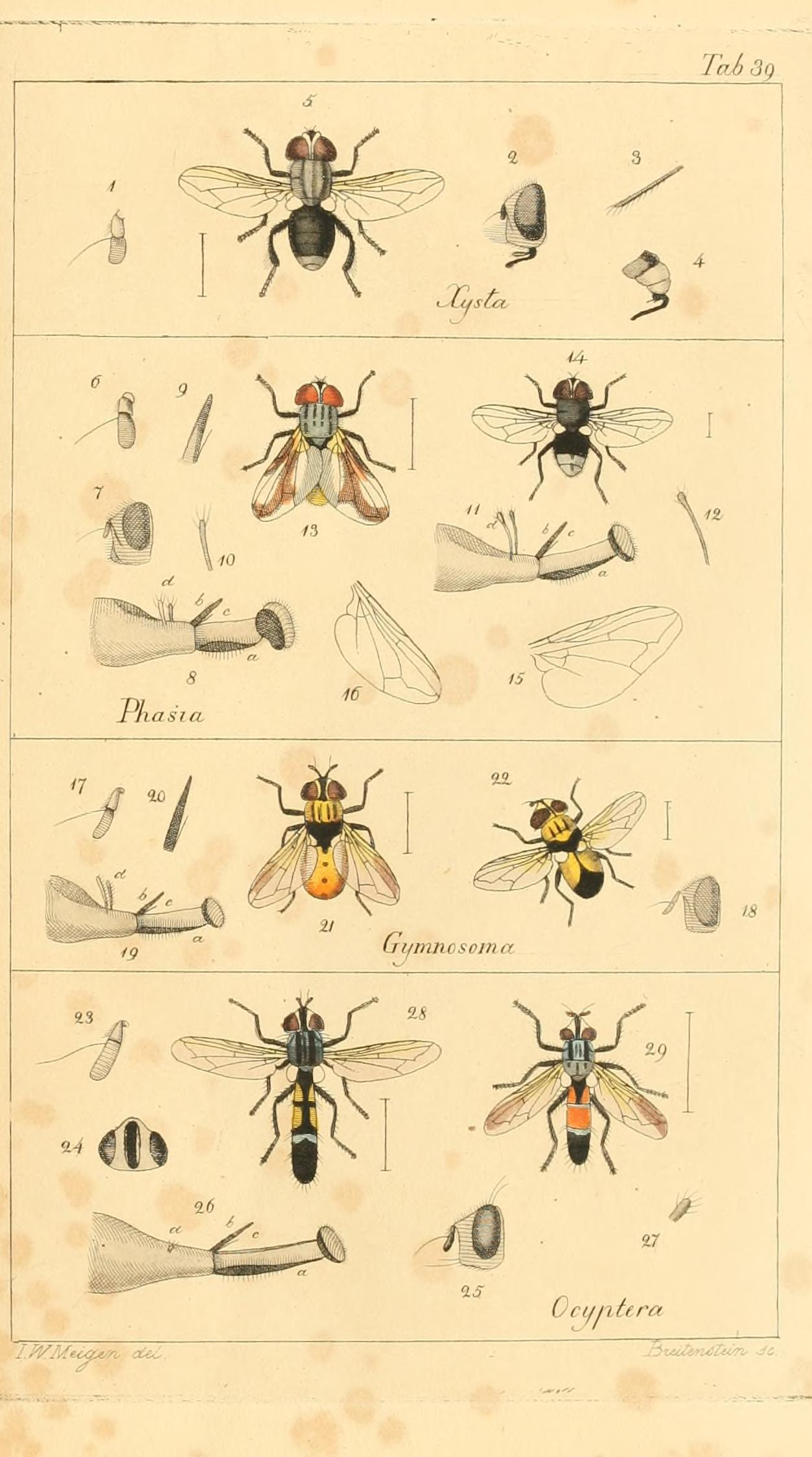
- Xysta in Meigen Systematische Beschreibung der bekannten europäischen zweiflügeligen Insekten 1824

Scientific classification
- Kingdom: Animalia
- Phylum: Arthropoda
- Class: Insecta
- Order: Diptera
- Family: Tachinidae
- Subfamily: Phasiinae
- Tribe: Xystini
- Genus: Xysta; Meigen, 1824

Type species
- Xysta cilipes Meigen, 1824

Synonyms
- Kiritshenkia Zimin, 1926; Xista Rondani, 1856

= Xysta =

Genus of flies

Xysta is a genus of flies in the family Tachinidae.

== Species ==
- Xysta holosericea (Fabricius, 1805)
- Xysta incana Suster, 1929
