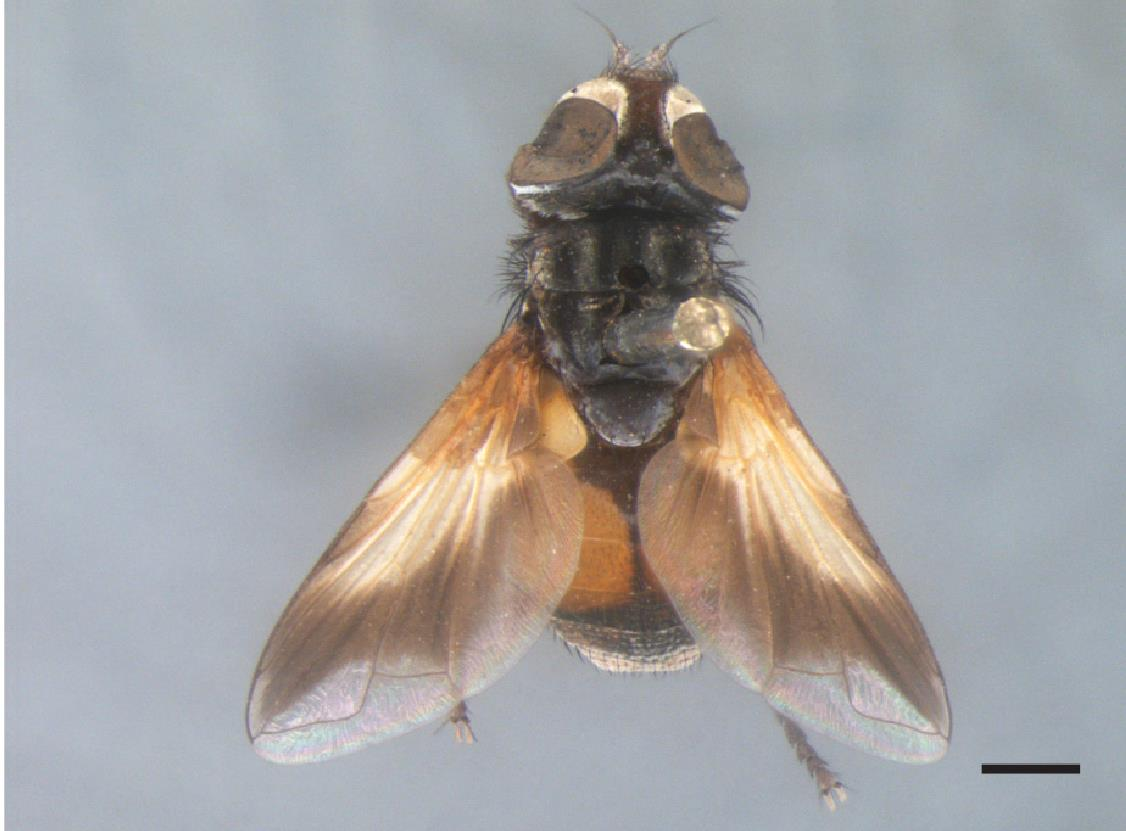

Scientific classification
- Kingdom: Animalia
- Phylum: Arthropoda
- Clade: Pancrustacea
- Class: Insecta
- Order: Diptera
- Family: Tachinidae
- Subfamily: Phasiinae
- Tribe: Gymnosomatini
- Genus: Ectophasiopsis; Townsend, 1915

Type species
- Ectophasiopsis chilensis Townsend, 1915

Synonyms
- Ectophasiops Sabrosky, 1950

= Ectophasiopsis =

Genus of flies

Ectophasiopsis is a genus of flies in the family Tachinidae.

== Species ==
- Ectophasiopsis arcuata (Bigot, 1876)
- Ectophasiopsis gradata (Wiedemann, 1830)
- Ectophasiopsis ypiranga Dios & Nihei, 2017
