= Cylindrophasia =

Scientific classification
- Kingdom: Animalia
- Phylum: Arthropoda
- Class: Insecta
- Order: Diptera
- Family: Tachinidae
- Subfamily: Phasiinae
- Tribe: Gymnosomatini
- Genus: Cylindrophasia; Townsend, 1916

Type species
- Ocyptera similima Fabricius, 1805

Genus of flies

Cylindrophasia is a genus of flies in the family Tachinidae.

== Species ==
- Cylindrophasia lateralis (Walker, 1849)
- Cylindrophasia obscura (Bigot, 1876)
- Cylindrophasia simillima (Fabricius, 1805)
- Cylindrophasia tehuantepeca (Townsend, 1908)
