= Euacaulona =

Scientific classification
- Kingdom: Animalia
- Phylum: Arthropoda
- Class: Insecta
- Order: Diptera
- Family: Tachinidae
- Subfamily: Phasiinae
- Tribe: Gymnosomatini
- Genus: Euacaulona; Townsend, 1908

Type species
- Euacaulona sumichrasti Townsend, 1908

Genus of flies

Euacaulona is a genus of flies in the family Tachinidae.

== Species ==
- Euacaulona sumichrasti Townsend, 1908

== Distribution ==
Mexico, Brazil, Guyana, Paraguay.
