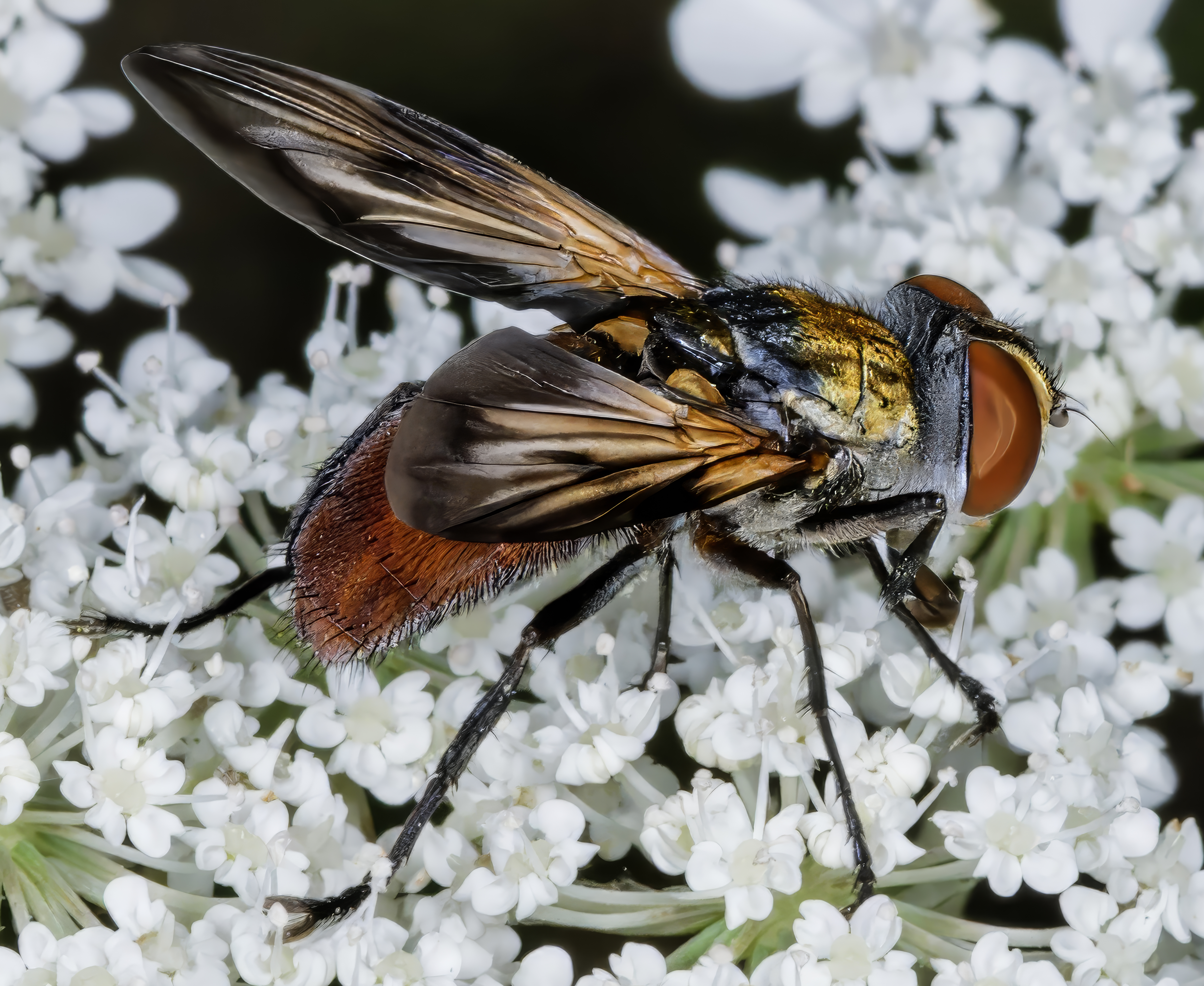
- Ectophasia crassipennis on Ammis majus

Scientific classification
- Kingdom: Animalia
- Phylum: Arthropoda
- Clade: Pancrustacea
- Class: Insecta
- Order: Diptera
- Family: Tachinidae
- Subfamily: Phasiinae
- Tribe: Gymnosomatini
- Genus: Ectophasia; Townsend, 1912

Type species
- Syrphus crassipennis Fabricius, 1794

Synonyms
- Ochrophasia Townsend, 1927

= Ectophasia =

Genus of flies

Ectophasia is a genus of flies in the family Tachinidae.

Ectophasia sp.

== Species ==
- Ectophasia atripennis (Townsend, 1927)
- Ectophasia basalis (Meigen, 1838)
- Ectophasia crassipennis (Fabricius, 1794)
- Ectophasia leucoptera (Rondani, 1865)
- Ectophasia oblonga (Robineau-Desvoidy, 1830)
- Ectophasia platymesa (Walker, 1858)
- Ectophasia rotundiventris (Loew, 1858)
- Ectophasia sinensis Villeneuve, 1933
