= Perigymnosoma =

Scientific classification
- Kingdom: Animalia
- Phylum: Arthropoda
- Class: Insecta
- Order: Diptera
- Family: Tachinidae
- Subfamily: Phasiinae
- Tribe: Phasiini
- Genus: Perigymnosoma; Villeneuve, 1929

Type species
- Perigymnosoma globulum Villeneuve, 1929

Genus of flies

Perigymnosoma is a genus of flies in the family Tachinidae.

== Species ==
- Perigymnosoma globulum Villeneuve, 1929
- Perigymnosoma rubidum Mesnil, 1953
