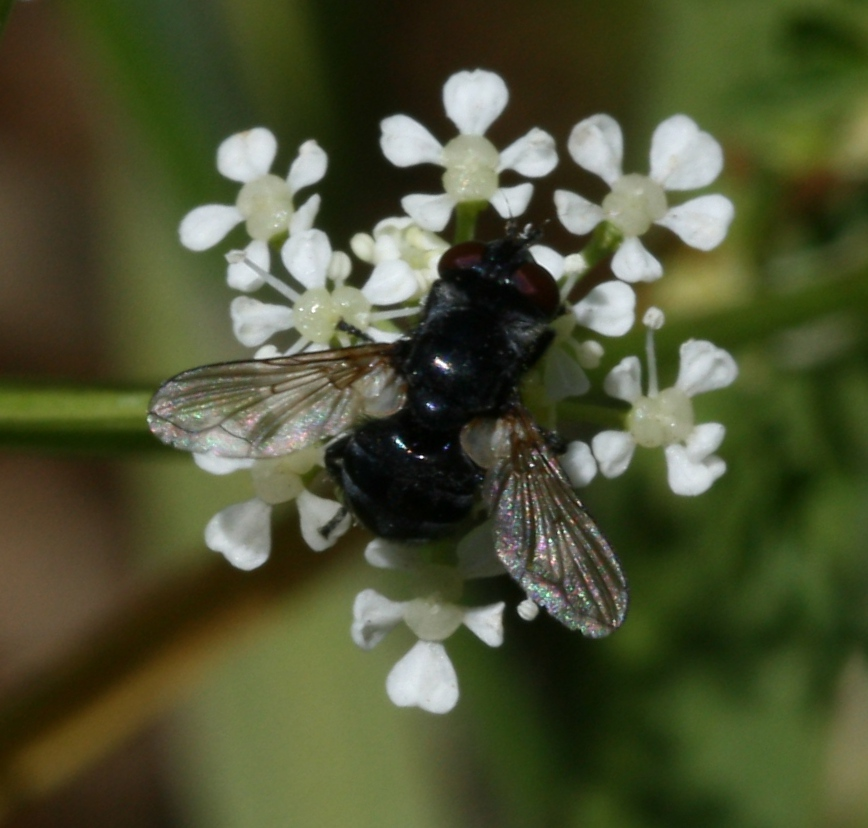

Scientific classification
- Kingdom: Animalia
- Phylum: Arthropoda
- Clade: Pancrustacea
- Class: Insecta
- Order: Diptera
- Family: Tachinidae
- Subfamily: Phasiinae
- Tribe: Gymnosomatini
- Genus: Gymnoclytia; Brauer & von Berganstamm, 1893

Type species
- Cistogaster divisa (=Gymnosoma occidua Walker, 1849) Loew, 1863

Synonyms
- Procistogaster Townsend, 1934; Siphopallasia Brooks, 1946

= Gymnoclytia =

Genus of flies

Gymnoclytia is a genus of flies in the family Tachinidae.

== Species ==
- Gymnoclytia dubia (West, 1925)
- Gymnoclytia ferruginosa (Wulp, 1892)
- Gymnoclytia griseonigra (Wulp, 1892)
- Gymnoclytia hirticollis (Wulp, 1892)
- Gymnoclytia immaculata (Macquart, 1844)
- Gymnoclytia melanosoma (Wulp, 1892)
- Gymnoclytia minuta Brooks, 1946
- Gymnoclytia occidentalis Townsend, 1908
- Gymnoclytia occidua (Walker, 1849)
- Gymnoclytia paulista Townsend, 1929
- Gymnoclytia propinqua (Wulp, 1892)
- Gymnoclytia subpetiolata (Wulp, 1892)
- Gymnoclytia unicolor (Brooks, 1946)
- Gymnoclytia variegata (Wulp, 1892)

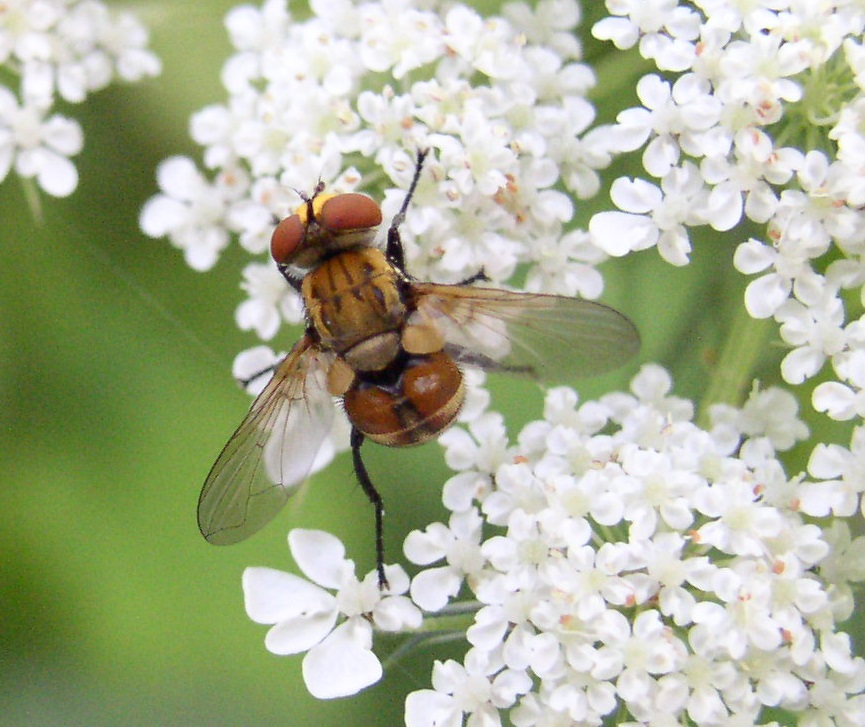
Male Gymnoclytia
