= Urucurymyia =

Scientific classification
- Kingdom: Animalia
- Phylum: Arthropoda
- Class: Insecta
- Order: Diptera
- Family: Tachinidae
- Subfamily: Phasiinae
- Tribe: Gymnosomatini
- Genus: Urucurymyia; Townsend, 1934

Type species
- Urucurymyia urna Townsend, 1934

Genus of flies

Urucurymyia is a genus of flies in the family Tachinidae.

== Species ==
- Urucurymyia urna Townsend, 1934

== Distribution ==
Brazil.
