= Vanderwulpella =

Scientific classification
- Kingdom: Animalia
- Phylum: Arthropoda
- Class: Insecta
- Order: Diptera
- Family: Tachinidae
- Subfamily: Phasiinae
- Tribe: Strongygastrini
- Genus: Vanderwulpella; Townsend, 1919

Type species
- Xanthomelana anceps Wulp, 1892

Genus of flies

Vanderwulpella is a genus of flies in the family Tachinidae.

== Species ==
- Vanderwulpella anceps (Wulp, 1892)

== Distribution ==
Mexico.
