= Paraclara =

Scientific classification
- Kingdom: Animalia
- Phylum: Arthropoda
- Class: Insecta
- Order: Diptera
- Family: Tachinidae
- Subfamily: Phasiinae
- Tribe: Hermyini
- Genus: Paraclara; Bezzi, 1908

Synonyms
- Clara Brauer & von Berganstamm, 1889

Genus of flies

Paraclara is a genus of flies in the family Tachinidae.

== Species ==
- Paraclara dimidiata (Brauer & von Berganstamm, 1889)
- Paraclara magnifica Bezzi, 1908
