= Parerigone =

Scientific classification
- Kingdom: Animalia
- Phylum: Arthropoda
- Class: Insecta
- Order: Diptera
- Family: Tachinidae
- Subfamily: Phasiinae
- Tribe: Parerigonini
- Genus: Parerigone; Brauer, 1898

Type species
- Parerigone aurea Brauer, 1898

Synonyms
- Parerigonesis Chao & Sun, 1990

Genus of flies

Parerigone is a genus of flies in the family Tachinidae.

== Species ==
- Parerigone atrisetosa Wang, Zhang & Wang, 2015
- Parerigone aurea Brauer, 1898
- Parerigone brachyfurca Chao & Zhou, 1990
- Parerigone eristaloides Mesnil, 1953
- Parerigone flava Wang, Zhang & Wang, 2015
- Parerigone flavipes Shima, 2012
- Parerigone flavisquama Wang, Zhang & Wang, 2015
- Parerigone huangshanensis (Chao & Sun, 1990)
- Parerigone laxifrons Wang, Zhang & Wang, 2015
- Parerigone macrophthalma Herting, 1981
- Parerigone malaisei Mesnil, 1957
- Parerigone nigrocauda (Chao & Sun, 1990)
- Parerigone takanoi Mesnil, 1957
- Parerigone tianmushana Chao & Sun, 1990
- Parerigone wangi Wang, Zhang & Wang, 2015
