= Parerigonini =

Scientific classification
- Kingdom: Animalia
- Phylum: Arthropoda
- Class: Insecta
- Order: Diptera
- Family: Tachinidae
- Subfamily: Phasiinae
- Tribe: Parerigonini

Tribe of flies

Parerigonini is a tribe of flies in the family Tachinidae.

== Genera ==
- Parerigone Brauer, 1898
- Paropesia Mesnil, 1970
- Zambesomima Mesnil, 1967
