= Melastrongygaster =

Scientific classification
- Kingdom: Animalia
- Phylum: Arthropoda
- Class: Insecta
- Order: Diptera
- Family: Tachinidae
- Subfamily: Phasiinae
- Tribe: Strongygastrini
- Genus: Melastrongygaster; Shima, 2015

Type species
- Melastrongygaster atrata Shima, 2015

Genus of flies

Melastrongygaster is a genus of flies in the family Tachinidae.

== Species ==
- Melastrongygaster atrata Shima, 2015
- Melastrongygaster chaoi Shima, 2015
- Melastrongygaster fuscipennis Shima, 2015
- Melastrongygaster kambaitiana Shima, 2015
- Melastrongygaster orbitalis Shima, 2015
