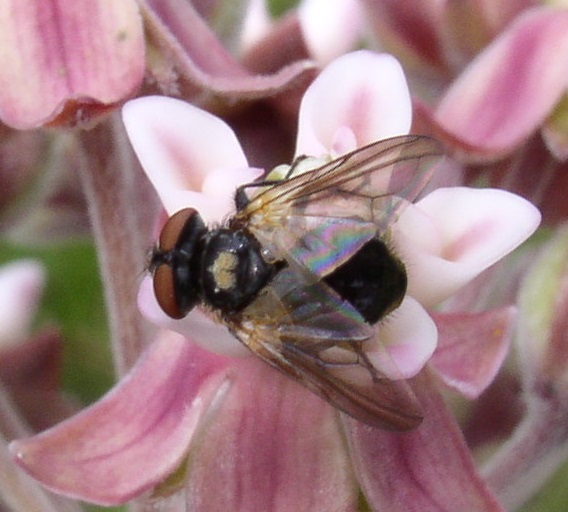
- Phasia aurulans on common milkweed

Scientific classification
- Kingdom: Animalia
- Phylum: Arthropoda
- Class: Insecta
- Order: Diptera
- Family: Tachinidae
- Subfamily: Phasiinae
- Tribe: Phasiini

= Phasiini =

Tribe of flies

Phasiini is a tribe of flies in the family Tachinidae. As a result of phylogenetic research, most members of this tribe were transferred to other tribes in the subfamily, leaving only the two genera Elomya and Phasia.

== Genera ==
- Compsoptesis Villeneuve, 1915
- Elomya Robineau-Desvoidy, 1830
- Euscopoliopteryx Townsend, 1917
- Perigymnosoma Villeneuve, 1929
- Phasia Latreille, 1804
- Saralba Walker, 1865
- Subclytia Pandellé, 1894
