= Zitini =

Scientific classification
- Kingdom: Animalia
- Phylum: Arthropoda
- Class: Insecta
- Order: Diptera
- Family: Tachinidae
- Subfamily: Phasiinae
- Tribe: Zitini

Tribe of flies

Zitini is a tribe of flies in the family Tachinidae.

== Genera ==
- Leverella Baranov, 1934
- Zita Curran, 1927
