= Formicophania =

Scientific classification
- Kingdom: Animalia
- Phylum: Arthropoda
- Class: Insecta
- Order: Diptera
- Family: Tachinidae
- Subfamily: Phasiinae
- Tribe: Hermyini
- Genus: Formicophania; Townsend, 1916

Type species
- Formicophania elegans Townsend, 1916

Genus of flies

Formicophania is a genus of flies in the family Tachinidae.

== Species ==
- Formicophania elegans Townsend, 1916

== Distribution ==
Malaysia, Thailand.
