= Syringosoma =

Scientific classification
- Kingdom: Animalia
- Phylum: Arthropoda
- Clade: Pancrustacea
- Class: Insecta
- Order: Diptera
- Family: Tachinidae
- Subfamily: Phasiinae
- Tribe: Gymnosomatini
- Genus: Syringosoma; Townsend, 1917

Type species
- Syringosoma pennipes Townsend, 1917

Genus of flies

Syringosoma is a genus of flies in the family Tachinidae.

== Species ==
- Syringosoma pennipes Townsend, 1917

== Distribution ==
Syringosoma is known only from Brazil.
