= Penthosiosoma =

Scientific classification
- Kingdom: Animalia
- Phylum: Arthropoda
- Class: Insecta
- Order: Diptera
- Family: Tachinidae
- Subfamily: Phasiinae
- Tribe: Hermyini
- Genus: Penthosiosoma; Townsend, 1926

Type species
- Penthosiosoma picitipenne Townsend, 1926

Genus of flies

Penthosiosoma is a genus of flies in the family Tachinidae.

== Species ==
- Penthosiosoma picitipenne Townsend, 1926

== Distribution ==
Laos, Malaysia.
