= Elomya =

- Elomya lateralis

Scientific classification
- Kingdom: Animalia
- Phylum: Arthropoda
- Clade: Pancrustacea
- Class: Insecta
- Order: Diptera
- Family: Tachinidae
- Subfamily: Phasiinae
- Tribe: Phasiini
- Genus: Elomya; Robineau-Desvoidy, 1830

Type species
- Elodia claripennis Robineau-Desvoidy, 1830

Synonyms
- Elomyia Macquart, 1834; Ananta Meigen, 1838; Helomyia Meigen, 1838

Genus of flies

Elomya is a genus of flies in the family Tachinidae.

== Species ==
- Elomya lateralis (Meigen, 1824)
- Elomya rubida Robineau-Desvoidy, 1863
