= Euclytia =

Scientific classification
- Kingdom: Animalia
- Phylum: Arthropoda
- Clade: Pancrustacea
- Class: Insecta
- Order: Diptera
- Family: Tachinidae
- Subfamily: Phasiinae
- Tribe: Gymnosomatini
- Genus: Euclytia; Townsend, 1908

Type species
- Clytia flava Townsend, 1891

Genus of flies

Euclytia is a genus of flies in the family Tachinidae.

== Species ==
- Euclytia flava (Townsend, 1891)

== Distribution ==
Canada, United States.
