= Compsoptesis =

Scientific classification
- Kingdom: Animalia
- Phylum: Arthropoda
- Class: Insecta
- Order: Diptera
- Family: Tachinidae
- Subfamily: Phasiinae
- Tribe: Phasiini
- Genus: Compsoptesis; Villeneuve, 1915

Type species
- Compsoptesis phoenix Villeneuve, 1915

Synonyms
- Tetrapteromyia Malloch, 1930

Genus of flies

Compsoptesis is a genus of flies in the family Tachinidae.

== Species ==
- Compsoptesis klossi (Malloch, 1930)
- Compsoptesis phoenix Villeneuve, 1915
- Compsoptesis rufula Villeneuve, 1915
