= Bibiomima =

Scientific classification
- Kingdom: Animalia
- Phylum: Arthropoda
- Class: Insecta
- Order: Diptera
- Family: Tachinidae
- Subfamily: Phasiinae
- Tribe: Gymnosomatini
- Genus: Bibiomima; Brauer & von Berganstamm, 1889

Type species
- Bibiomima handlirschi Brauer & von Berganstamm, 1889

Genus of flies

Bibiomima is a genus of flies in the family Tachinidae.

== Species ==
- Bibiomima handlirschi Brauer & von Berganstamm, 1889

== Distribution ==
Costa Rica, Panama, Brazil.
