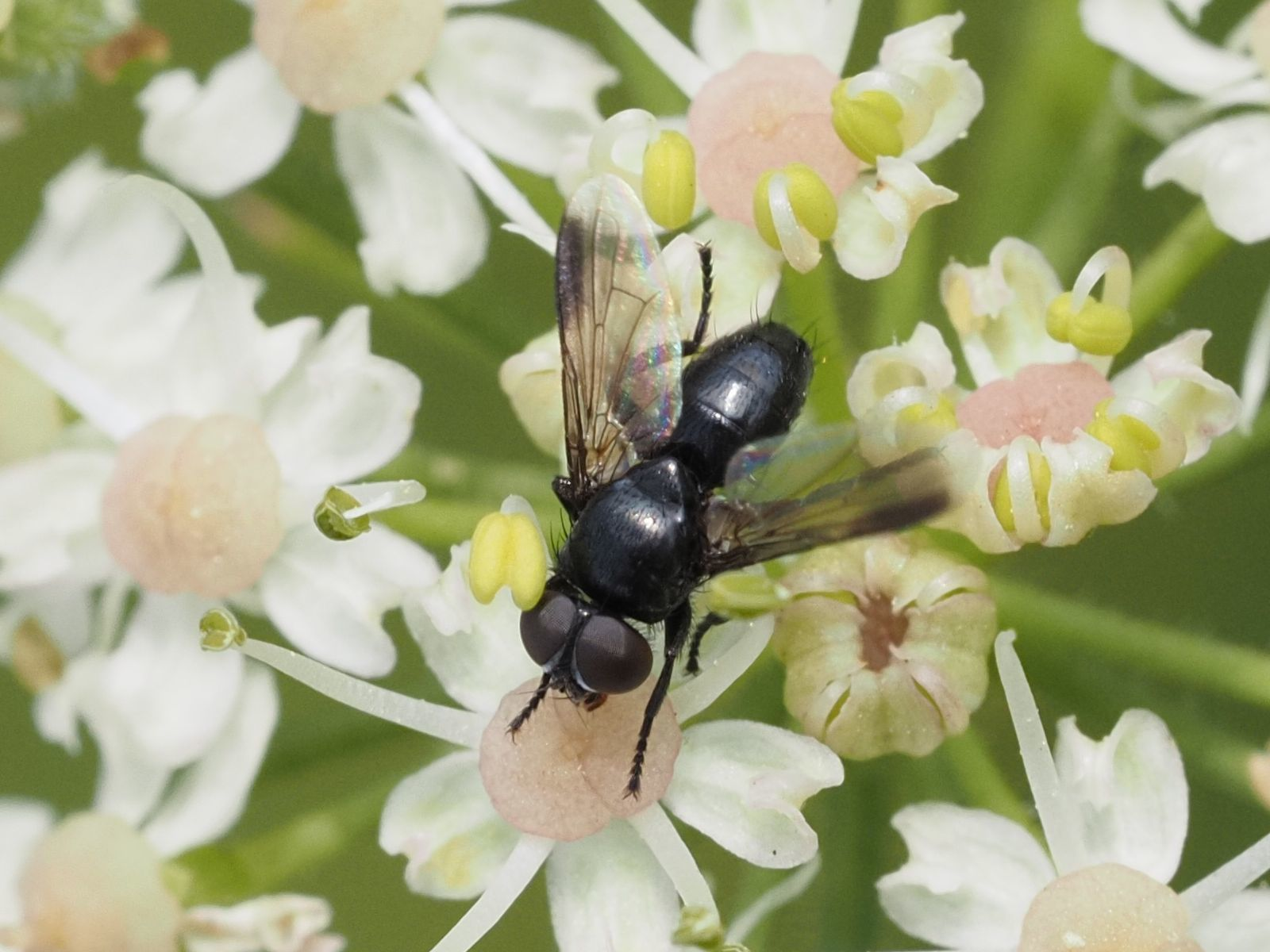
- Catharosia pygmaea, Austria

Scientific classification
- Kingdom: Animalia
- Phylum: Arthropoda
- Class: Insecta
- Order: Diptera
- Family: Tachinidae
- Subfamily: Phasiinae
- Tribe: Catharosiini
- Genus: Catharosia; Rondani, 1868

Type species
- Thereva pygmaea Fallén, 1815

Synonyms
- Alitophasia Townsend, 1934; Archiphania Emden, 1945; Microsciasma Townsend, 1915; Petia Coquillett, 1910; Procatharosia Villeneuve, 1924; Sciasma Coquillett, 1897

= Catharosia =

Genus of flies

Catharosia is a genus of flies in the family Tachinidae.

== Species ==
- Catharosia albisquama (Villeneuve, 1932)
- Catharosia alutacea (Emden, 1945)
- Catharosia calva (Coquillett, 1910)
- Catharosia capensis Verbeke, 1970
- Catharosia claripennis Kugler, 1977
- Catharosia flavicornis (Zetterstedt, 1859)
- Catharosia frontalis (Smith, 1917)
- Catharosia lustrans (Reinhard, 1944)
- Catharosia minuta (Townsend, 1915)
- Catharosia nebulosa (Coquillett, 1897)
- Catharosia pygmaea (Fallén, 1815)
- Catharosia valescens Villeneuve, 1942
