= Paropesia =

Scientific classification
- Kingdom: Animalia
- Phylum: Arthropoda
- Class: Insecta
- Order: Diptera
- Family: Tachinidae
- Subfamily: Phasiinae
- Tribe: Parerigonini
- Genus: Paropesia; Mesnil, 1970

Type species
- Paropesia nigra Mesnil, 1970

Genus of flies

Paropesia is a genus of flies in the family Tachinidae.

== Species ==
- Paropesia discalis Shima, 2014
- Paropesia grisea Shima, 2014
- Paropesia nigra Mesnil, 1970
- Paropesia tessellata Shima, 2014
