= Shannonomyiella =

Scientific classification
- Kingdom: Animalia
- Phylum: Arthropoda
- Class: Insecta
- Order: Diptera
- Family: Tachinidae
- Subfamily: Phasiinae
- Genus: Shannonomyiella; Townsend, 1939

Type species
- Shannonomyiella ortalidoptera Townsend, 1939

Genus of flies

Shannonomyiella is a genus of flies in the family Tachinidae.

== Species ==
- Shannonomyiella ortalidoptera Townsend, 1939

== Distribution ==
Brazil.
