= Rondaniooestrus =

Scientific classification
- Kingdom: Animalia
- Phylum: Arthropoda
- Class: Insecta
- Order: Diptera
- Family: Tachinidae
- Subfamily: Phasiinae
- Tribe: Strongygastrini
- Genus: Rondaniooestrus; Villeneuve, 1916

Type species
- Rondaniooestrus apivorus Villeneuve, 1916

Genus of flies

Rondaniooestrus is a genus of flies in the family Tachinidae.

== Species ==
- Rondaniooestrus apivorus Villeneuve, 1916

== Distribution ==
Kenya, South Africa, Tanzania, Uganda.
