= Zita (fly) =

Scientific classification
- Kingdom: Animalia
- Phylum: Arthropoda
- Clade: Pancrustacea
- Class: Insecta
- Order: Diptera
- Family: Tachinidae
- Subfamily: Phasiinae
- Tribe: Zitini
- Genus: Zita; Curran, 1927

Type species
- Zita aureopyga Curran, 1927

Genus of flies

Zita is a genus of flies in the family Tachinidae.

== Species ==
- Zita aureopyga Curran, 1927

== Distribution ==
Australia.
