= Mahauiella =

Scientific classification
- Kingdom: Animalia
- Phylum: Arthropoda
- Clade: Pancrustacea
- Class: Insecta
- Order: Diptera
- Family: Tachinidae
- Subfamily: Phasiinae
- Tribe: Gymnosomatini
- Genus: Mahauiella; Toma, 2003

Type species
- Mahauiella nayrae Toma, 2003

Genus of flies

Mahauiella is a genus of flies in the family Tachinidae.

== Species ==
- Mahauiella nayrae Toma, 2003
- Mahauiella sforcini Toma, 2003
