= Bogosia =

- Bogosia bequaerti

Scientific classification
- Kingdom: Animalia
- Phylum: Arthropoda
- Clade: Pancrustacea
- Class: Insecta
- Order: Diptera
- Family: Tachinidae
- Subfamily: Phasiinae
- Tribe: Gymnosomatini
- Genus: Bogosia; Rondani, 1873

Type species
- Bogosia antinorii Rondani, 1873

Synonyms
- Engelobogosia Townsend, 1933; Epineura Brauer & von Berganstamm, 1891

Genus of flies

Bogosia is a genus of flies in the family Tachinidae.

== Species ==
- Bogosia antinorii Rondani, 1873
- Bogosia argentea Barraclough, 1985
- Bogosia bequaerti Villeneuve, 1913
- Bogosia curvaverpa Barraclough, 1985
- Bogosia grahami Barraclough, 1985
- Bogosia helva (Wiedemann, 1818)
- Bogosia minor (Villeneuve, 1913)
- Bogosia rogezensis Barraclough, 1985
- Bogosia taeniata (Wiedemann, 1824)
