= Saralba =

Scientific classification
- Kingdom: Animalia
- Phylum: Arthropoda
- Class: Insecta
- Order: Diptera
- Family: Tachinidae
- Subfamily: Phasiinae
- Tribe: Phasiini
- Genus: Saralba; Walker, 1865

Type species
- Saralba ocypteroides Walker, 1865

Synonyms
- Pseudotrichopoda Malloch, 1933

Genus of flies

Saralba is a genus of flies in the family Tachinidae.

== Species ==
- Saralba ocypteroides Walker, 1865

== Distribution ==
Australia, Indonesia, Papua New Guinea.
