= Stackelbergomyia =

Scientific classification
- Kingdom: Animalia
- Phylum: Arthropoda
- Class: Insecta
- Order: Diptera
- Family: Tachinidae
- Subfamily: Phasiinae
- Tribe: Catharosiini
- Genus: Stackelbergomyia; Rohdendorf, 1948

Type species
- Stackelbergomyia arenaria Rohdendorf, 1948

Genus of flies

Stackelbergomyia is a genus of flies in the family Tachinidae.

== Species ==
- Stackelbergomyia arenaria Rohdendorf, 1948

== Distribution ==
Turkmenistan, Russia.
