= Xystini =

Scientific classification
- Kingdom: Animalia
- Phylum: Arthropoda
- Class: Insecta
- Order: Diptera
- Family: Tachinidae
- Subfamily: Phasiinae
- Tribe: Xystini

Tribe of flies

Xystini is a tribe of flies in the family Tachinidae.

== Genera ==
- Xysta Meigen, 1824
