= Zambesomima =

Scientific classification
- Kingdom: Animalia
- Phylum: Arthropoda
- Class: Insecta
- Order: Diptera
- Family: Tachinidae
- Subfamily: Phasiinae
- Tribe: Parerigonini
- Genus: Zambesomima; Mesnil, 1967

Type species
- Zambesomima hirsuta Mesnil, 1967

Genus of flies

Zambesomima is a genus of flies in the family Tachinidae.

== Species ==
- Zambesomima flava Wang, Wang & Zhang, 2014
- Zambesomima hirsuta Mesnil, 1967
