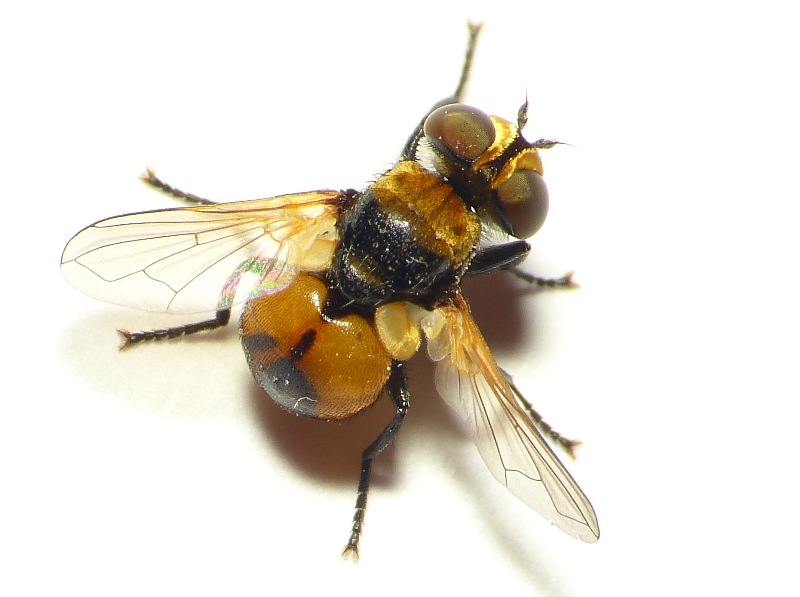
- Cistogaster globosa

Scientific classification
- Kingdom: Animalia
- Phylum: Arthropoda
- Clade: Pancrustacea
- Class: Insecta
- Order: Diptera
- Family: Tachinidae
- Subfamily: Phasiinae
- Tribe: Gymnosomatini
- Genus: Cistogaster; Latreille, 1829

Type species
- Syrphus globosa Fabricius, 1775

Synonyms
- Pallasia Robineau-Desvoidy, 1830; Palasia Rondani, 1862; Clistogaster Neuhaus, 1886; Clitogaster Neuhaus, 1886; Clystogaster Neuhaus, 1886; Cystogaster Bezzi & Stein, 1907

= Cistogaster =

Genus of flies

Cistogaster is a genus of tachinid flies in the family Tachinidae. Known hosts are Hemiptera of the genus Aelia sp. (family Pentatomidae).

== Species ==
- Cistogaster acuta (Zimin, 1966)
- Cistogaster agata (Zimin, 1966)
- Cistogaster dominica Curran, 1927
- Cistogaster globosa (Fabricius, 1775)
- Cistogaster insularis Williston, 1896
- Cistogaster mesnili (Zimin, 1966)
- Cistogaster sinuata (Zimin, 1966)
