= Pentatomophaga =

Scientific classification
- Kingdom: Animalia
- Phylum: Arthropoda
- Class: Insecta
- Order: Diptera
- Family: Tachinidae
- Subfamily: Phasiinae
- Tribe: Gymnosomatini
- Genus: Pentatomophaga; Meijere, 1917

Type species
- Pentatomophaga bicincta Meijere, 1917

Genus of flies

Pentatomophaga is a genus of flies in the family Tachinidae.

== Species ==
- Pentatomophaga bicincta Meijere, 1917
- Pentatomophaga latifascia (Villeneuve, 1932)
