= Pennapoda =

Scientific classification
- Kingdom: Animalia
- Phylum: Arthropoda
- Class: Insecta
- Order: Diptera
- Family: Tachinidae
- Subfamily: Phasiinae
- Tribe: Gymnosomatini
- Genus: Pennapoda; Townsend, 1897

Type species
- Trichopoda phasiana Townsend, 1897

Genus of flies

Pennapoda is a genus of flies in the family Tachinidae.

== Species ==
- Pennapoda phasiana (Townsend, 1897)

== Distribution ==
Mexico.
