= Euscopoliopteryx =

Scientific classification
- Kingdom: Animalia
- Phylum: Arthropoda
- Class: Insecta
- Order: Diptera
- Family: Tachinidae
- Subfamily: Phasiinae
- Tribe: Phasiini
- Genus: Euscopoliopteryx; Townsend, 1917

Type species
- Euscopoliopteryx nebulosa Townsend, 1917

Genus of flies

Euscopoliopteryx is a genus of flies in the family Tachinidae.

== Species ==
- Euscopoliopteryx externa (Fabricius, 1805)

== Distribution ==
Costa Rica, Brazil, Guyana, Suriname.
