= Cesaperua =

Scientific classification
- Kingdom: Animalia
- Phylum: Arthropoda
- Class: Insecta
- Order: Diptera
- Family: Tachinidae
- Subfamily: Phasiinae
- Tribe: Gymnosomatini
- Genus: Cesaperua; Koçak & Kemal, 2010

Type species
- Xenophasia xanthomelanodes Townsend, 1934

Synonyms
- Xenophasia Townsend, 1934

Genus of flies

Cesaperua is a genus of flies in the family Tachinidae.

== Species ==
- Cesaperua articulata (Wulp, 1892)
- Cesaperua xanthomelanodes (Townsend, 1934)
