= Penthosia =

Scientific classification
- Kingdom: Animalia
- Phylum: Arthropoda
- Clade: Pancrustacea
- Class: Insecta
- Order: Diptera
- Family: Tachinidae
- Subfamily: Phasiinae
- Tribe: Hermyini
- Genus: Penthosia; Wulp, 1892

Type species
- Scopolia satanica Bigot, 1889

Genus of flies

Penthosia is a genus of flies in the family Tachinidae.

== Distribution ==
Mexico.

== Species ==
- Penthosia satanica (Bigot, 1889)
