= Hermya =

Scientific classification
- Kingdom: Animalia
- Phylum: Arthropoda
- Class: Insecta
- Order: Diptera
- Family: Tachinidae
- Subfamily: Phasiinae
- Tribe: Hermyini
- Genus: Hermya; Robineau-Desvoidy, 1830

Type species
- Hermya afra Robineau-Desvoidy, 1830

Synonyms
- Deuteroclara Villeneuve, 1915; Liancosmia Speiser, 1910; Makilingimyia Townsend, 1928; Orectocera Wulp, 1881; Paraphania Brauer & von Berganstamm, 1889; Pseudorectocera Townsend, 1928

Genus of flies

Hermya is a genus of flies in the family Tachinidae.

== Species ==
- Hermya albifacies Curran, 1941
- Hermya albomicans Malloch, 1931
- Hermya armiventris Malloch, 1931
- Hermya beelzebul (Wiedemann, 1830)
- Hermya confusa Curran, 1941
- Hermya cristata Malloch, 1931
- Hermya diabolus (Wiedemann, 1819)
- Hermya ditissima (Speiser, 1910)
- Hermya formosana Villeneuve, 1939
- Hermya melanoptera (Townsend, 1928)
- Hermya micans (Wulp, 1881)
- Hermya minor Malloch, 1931
- Hermya nigra Sun, 1994
- Hermya nitida Curran, 1941
- Hermya regalis (Villeneuve, 1915)
- Hermya surstylis Sun, 1994
- Hermya varipes Malloch, 1931
- Hermya vittata Curran, 1941
- Hermya yaanna Sun, 1994
