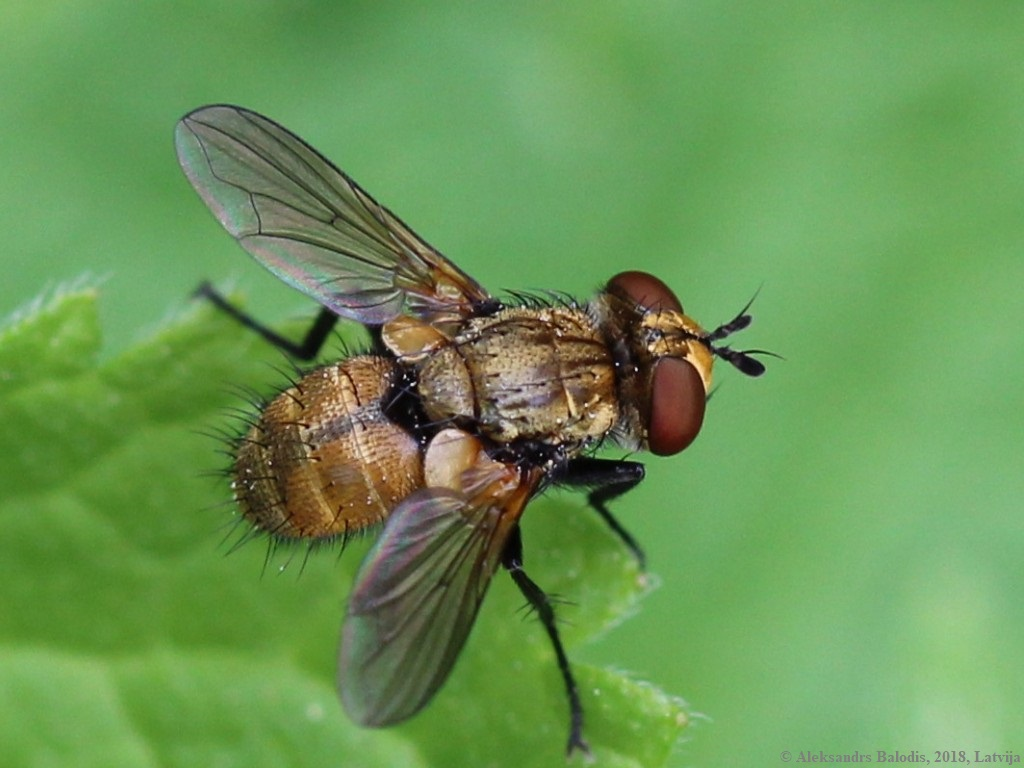
- Eliozeta pellucens

Scientific classification
- Kingdom: Animalia
- Phylum: Arthropoda
- Clade: Pancrustacea
- Class: Insecta
- Order: Diptera
- Family: Tachinidae
- Subfamily: Phasiinae
- Tribe: Gymnosomatini
- Genus: Eliozeta; Rondani, 1856

Type species
- Tachina pellucens Fallén, 1820

Synonyms
- Chryseria Robineau-Desvoidy, 1863; Eliozetta Lioy, 1864; Heliozeta Bezzi, 1907; Phanigaster Lioy, 1864

= Eliozeta =

Genus of flies

Eliozeta is a genus of flies in the family Tachinidae.

== Species ==
- Eliozeta helluo (Fabricius, 1805)
- Eliozeta pellucens (Fallén, 1820)
