= Bogosiella =

Scientific classification
- Kingdom: Animalia
- Phylum: Arthropoda
- Class: Insecta
- Order: Diptera
- Family: Tachinidae
- Subfamily: Phasiinae
- Tribe: Gymnosomatini
- Genus: Bogosiella; Villeneuve, 1923

Type species
- Bogosiella pomeroyi Villeneuve, 1923

Genus of flies

Bogosiella is a genus of flies in the family Tachinidae.

== Species ==
- Bogosiella pomeroyi Villeneuve, 1923

== Distribution ==
Ivory Coast, D.R. Congo, Ghana, Kenya, Malawi, Nigeria, Sierra Leone, South Africa, Sudan, Uganda, Zimbabwe.
