= Tarassus =

Scientific classification
- Kingdom: Animalia
- Phylum: Arthropoda
- Clade: Pancrustacea
- Class: Insecta
- Order: Diptera
- Family: Tachinidae
- Subfamily: Phasiinae
- Tribe: Gymnosomatini
- Genus: Tarassus; Aldrich, 1933

Genus of flies

Tarassus is a genus of flies in the family Tachinidae.

== Species ==
- Tarassus shannoni Aldrich, 1933

== Distribution ==
Brazil.
