= SMS Arcona =

Three cruising vessels of the Prussian Navy and later Imperial German Navy have been named SMS Arcona

- SMS Arcona (1858), a frigate launched in 1858
- SMS Arcona (1885), a steam corvette launched in 1885
- SMS Arcona (1902), a light cruiser launched in 1902

== See also ==
- SS Cap Arcona, a passenger liner requisitioned by the Kriegsmarine during World War II
