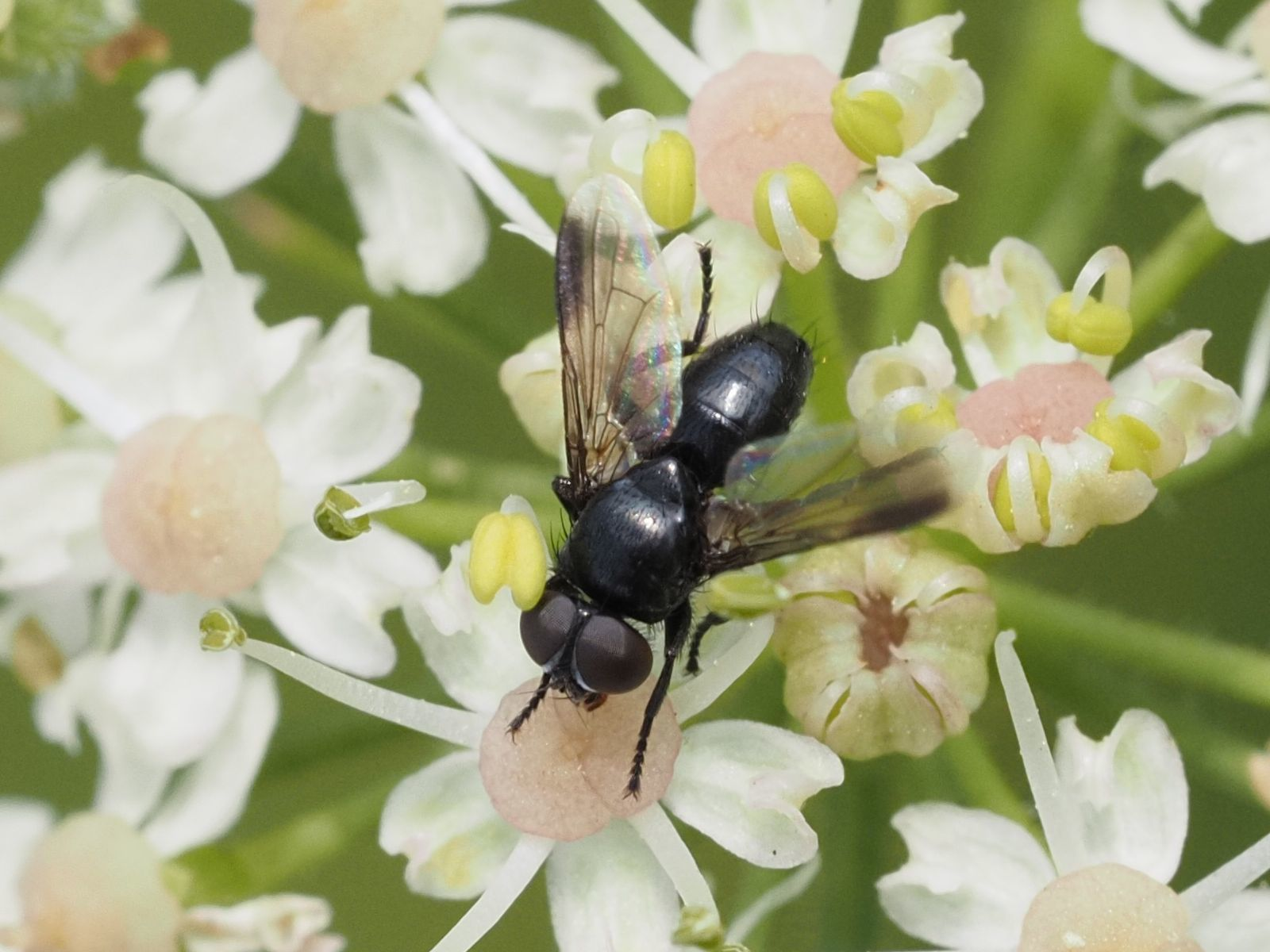
- Catharosia pygmaea, Austria

Scientific classification
- Kingdom: Animalia
- Phylum: Arthropoda
- Class: Insecta
- Order: Diptera
- Superfamily: Oestroidea
- Family: Tachinidae
- Subfamily: Phasiinae
- Tribe: Catharosiini

= Catharosiini =

Tribe of flies

Catharosiini is a tribe of flies in the family Tachinidae, containing two genera. Catharosia is a genus of small flies, less than 2 mm in length, and contains about 12 species. Stackelbergomyia is a monotypic genus found in the Palearctic.

== Genera ==
- Catharosia Rondani, 1868
- Stackelbergomyia Rohdendorf, 1948
