= Arcona (fly) =

Scientific classification
- Kingdom: Animalia
- Phylum: Arthropoda
- Class: Insecta
- Order: Diptera
- Family: Tachinidae
- Subfamily: Phasiinae
- Tribe: Strongygastrini
- Genus: Arcona; Richter, 1988

Type species
- Arcona amuricola Richter, 1988

Genus of flies

Arcona is a genus of flies in the family Tachinidae.

== Species ==
- Arcona amuricola Richter, 1988
- Arcona nishijimai (Mesnil, 1957)
