= Strongygastrini =

Scientific classification
- Kingdom: Animalia
- Phylum: Arthropoda
- Class: Insecta
- Order: Diptera
- Family: Tachinidae
- Subfamily: Phasiinae
- Tribe: Strongygastrini

Tribe of flies

Strongygastrini is a tribe of flies in the family Tachinidae.

== Genera ==
- Arcona Richter, 1988
- Melastrongygaster Shima, 2015
- Opesia Robineau-Desvoidy, 1863
- Rondaniooestrus Villeneuve, 1916
- Strongygaster Macquart, 1834
- Vanderwulpella Townsend, 1919
