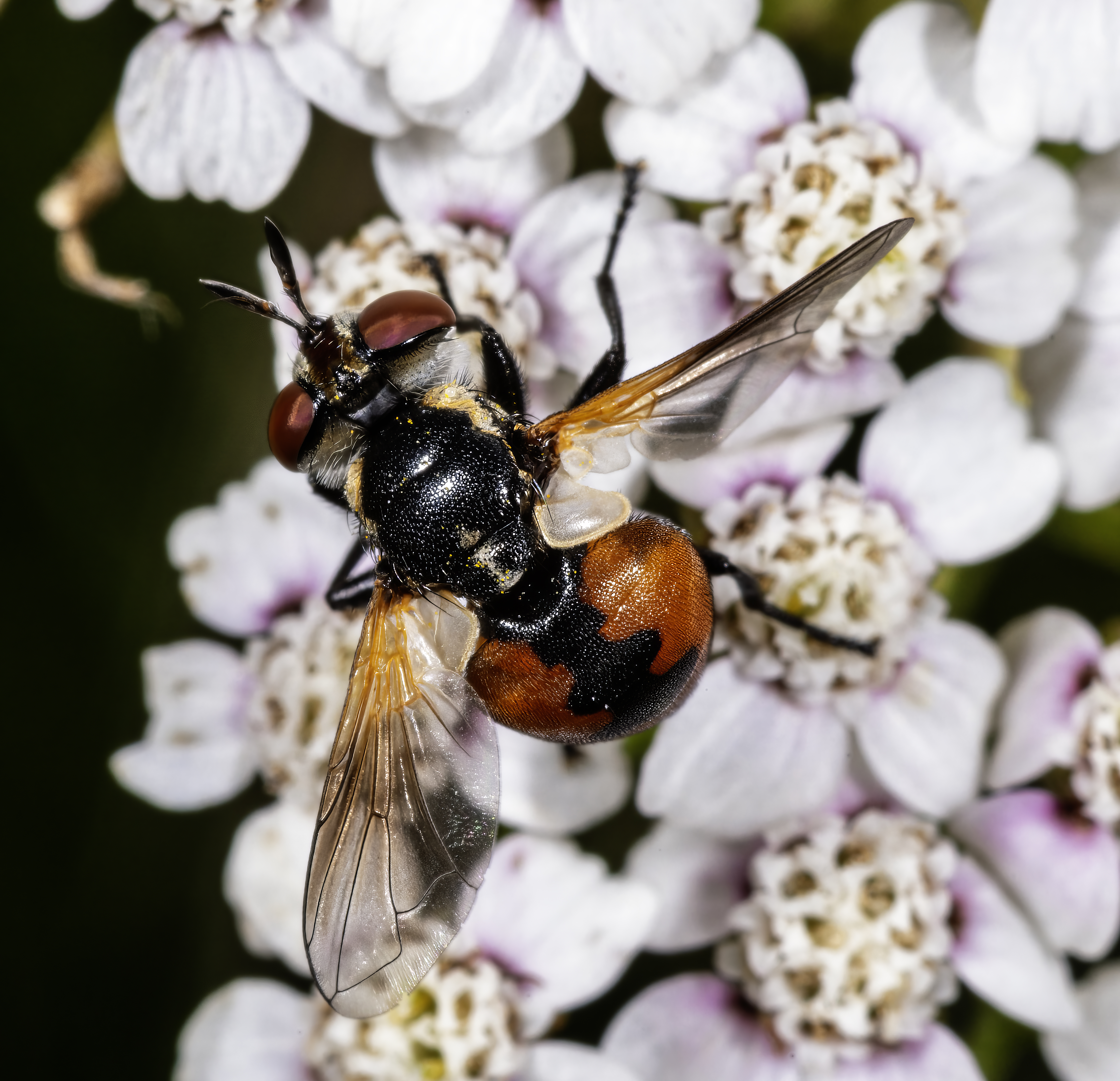
- Gymnosoma nudifrons

Scientific classification
- Kingdom: Animalia
- Phylum: Arthropoda
- Clade: Pancrustacea
- Class: Insecta
- Order: Diptera
- Family: Tachinidae
- Subfamily: Phasiinae
- Tribe: Gymnosomatini

Synonyms
- Trichopodini

= Gymnosomatini =

Tribe of flies

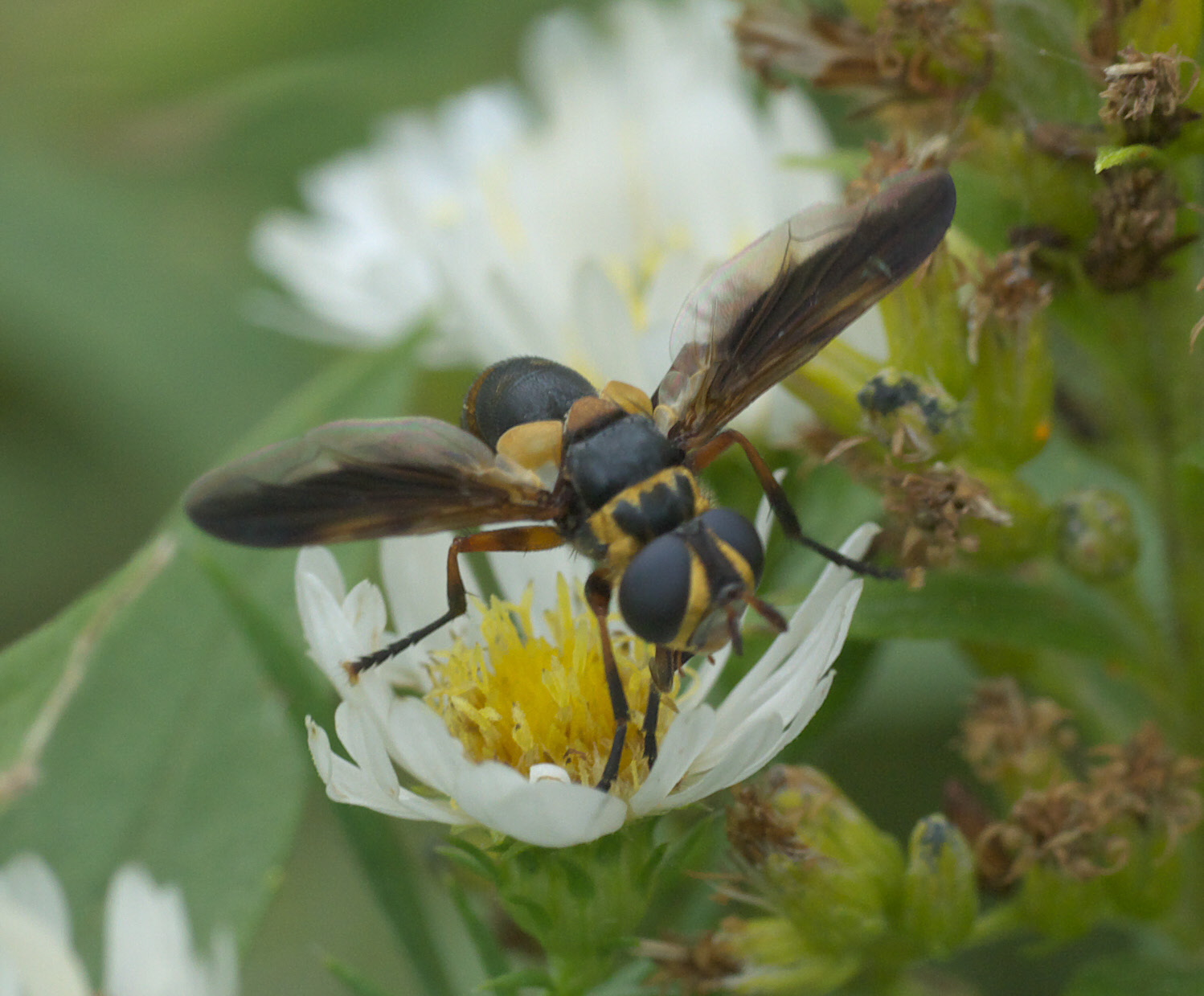
Trichopoda plumipes

Gymnosomatini is a tribe of bristle flies in the family Tachinidae. There are more than 30 genera and 200 described species in Gymnosomatini.

== Genera ==
- Acaulona Wulp, 1884
- Atrichiopoda Townsend, 1931
- Bibiomima Brauer & von Bergenstamm, 1889
- Bogosia Rondani, 1873
- Bogosiella Villeneuve, 1923
- Brasilomyia Özdikmen, 2010
- Cesaperua Koçak & Kemal, 2010
- Cistogaster Latreille, 1829
- Clytiomya Rondani, 1861
- Cylindrophasia Townsend, 1916
- Dallasimyia Blanchard, 1944
- Ectophasia Townsend, 1912
- Ectophasiopsis Townsend, 1915
- Eliozeta Rondani, 1856
- Euacaulona Townsend, 1908
- Euclytia Townsend, 1908
- Eutrichopoda Townsend, 1908
- Gymnoclytia Brauer & von Bergenstamm, 1893
- Gymnosoma Meigen, 1803
- Homogenia Wulp, 1892
- Itaxanthomelana Townsend, 1927
- Mahauiella Toma, 2003
- Melanorophasia Townsend, 1934
- Pennapoda Townsend, 1897
- Pentatomophaga Meijere, 1917
- Syringosoma Townsend, 1917
- Tapajosia Townsend, 1934
- Tarassus Aldrich, 1933
- Technamyia Reinhard, 1975
- Trichopoda Berthold, 1827 (feather-legged flies)
- Urucurymyia Townsend, 1934
- Xanthomelanodes Townsend, 1892
- Xanthomelanopsis Townsend, 1917
