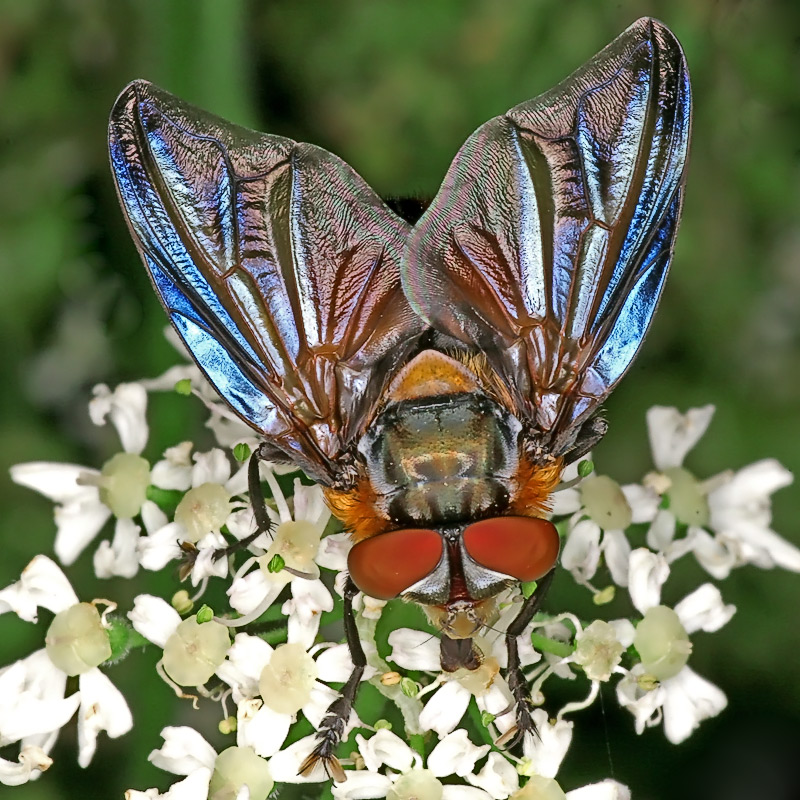
- Phasia hemiptera

Scientific classification
- Kingdom: Animalia
- Phylum: Arthropoda
- Clade: Pancrustacea
- Class: Insecta
- Order: Diptera
- Superfamily: Oestroidea
- Family: Tachinidae
- Subfamily: Phasiinae

= Phasiinae =

Subfamily of flies

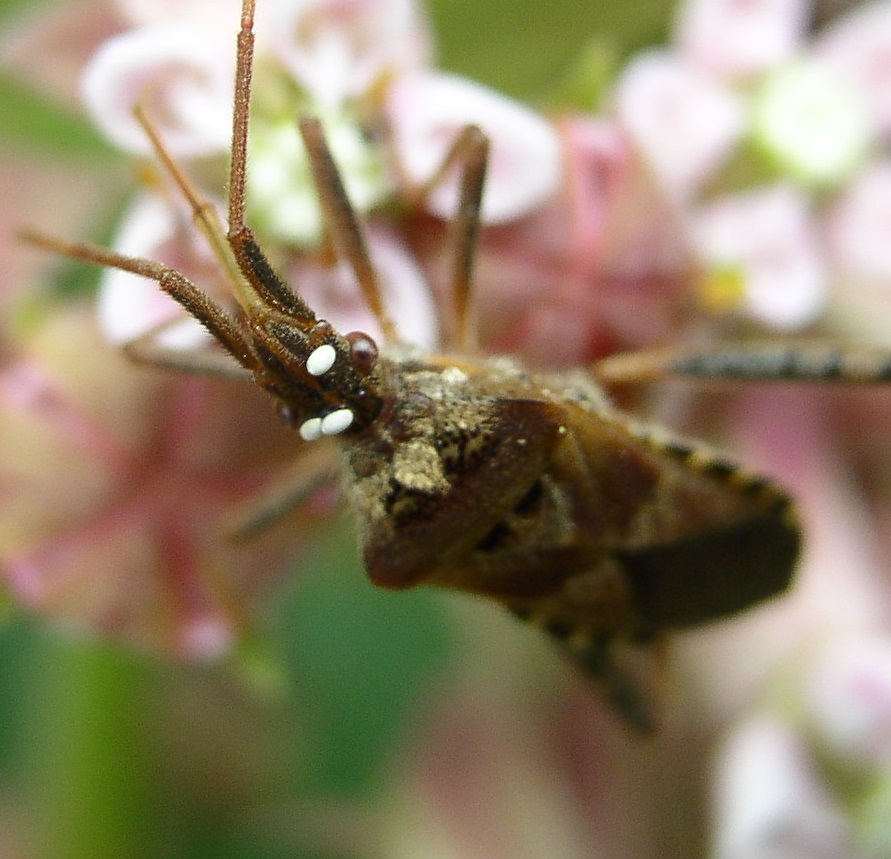
Tachinid eggs on Leptoglossus occidentalis

Phasiinae is a subfamily of flies in the family Tachinidae. Except for the small tribe Strongygastrini members of this subfamily attack only Heteroptera.

== Tribes & genera ==
The subfamily Phasiinae contains the following tribes and genera:

Tribe Catharosiini
- Catharosia Rondani, 1868
- Stackelbergomyia Rohdendorf, 1948
Tribe Cylindromyiini
- Australotachina Curran, 1834
- Bellina Robineau-Desvoidy, 1863
- Besseria Robineau-Desvoidy, 1830
- Catapariprosopa Townsend, 1927
- Cylindromyia Meigen, 1803
- Hemyda Robineau-Desvoidy, 1830
- Huttonobesseria Curran, 1927
- Lophosia Meigen, 1824
- Mesniletta Herting, 1979
- Neobrachelia Townsend, 1931
- Neolophosia Townsend, 1939
- Phania Meigen, 1824
- Phasiocyptera Townsend, 1927
- Polistiopsis Townsend, 1915
- Polybiocyptera Guimarães, 1979
- Pygidimyia Crosskey, 1967
Tribe Gymnosomatini
- Acaulona Wulp, 1884
- Atrichiopoda Townsend, 1931
- Bibiomima Brauer & von Bergenstamm, 1889
- Bogosia Rondani, 1873
- Bogosiella Villeneuve, 1923
- Brasilomyia Özdikmen, 2010
- Cesaperua Koçak & Kemal, 2010
- Cistogaster Latreille, 1829
- Clytiomya Rondani, 1861
- Cylindrophasia Townsend, 1916
- Dallasimyia Blanchard, 1944
- Ectophasia Townsend, 1912
- Ectophasiopsis Townsend, 1915
- Eliozeta Rondani, 1856
- Euacaulona Townsend, 1908
- Euclytia Townsend, 1908
- Eutrichopoda Townsend, 1908
- Gymnoclytia Brauer & von Bergenstamm, 1893
- Gymnosoma Meigen, 1803
- Homogenia Wulp, 1892
- Itaxanthomelana Townsend, 1927
- Mahauiella Toma, 2003
- Melanorophasia Townsend, 1934
- Pennapoda Townsend, 1897
- Pentatomophaga Meijere, 1917
- Syringosoma Townsend, 1917
- Tapajosia Townsend, 1934
- Tarassus Aldrich, 1933
- Technamyia Reinhard, 1975
- Trichopoda Berthold, 1827 (feather-legged flies)
- Urucurymyia Townsend, 1934
- Xanthomelanodes Townsend, 1892
- Xanthomelanopsis Townsend, 1917
Tribe Hermyini
- Formicophania Townsend, 1916
- Hermya Robineau-Desvoidy, 1830
- Paraclara Bezzi, 1908
- Penthosia Wulp, 1892
- Penthosiosoma Townsend, 1926
Tribe Leucostomatini
- Apomorphomyia Crosskey, 1984
- Brullaea Robineau-Desvoidy, 1863
- Cahenia Verbeke, 1960
- Calyptromyia Villeneuve, 1915
- Cinochira Zetterstedt, 1844
- Clairvillia Robineau-Desvoidy, 1830
- Clairvilliops Mesnil, 1959
- Clelimyia Herting, 1981
- Dionaea Robineau-Desvoidy, 1830
- Dionomelia Kugler, 1978
- Eulabidogaster Belanovsky, 1951
- Labigastera Macquart, 1834
- Leucostoma Meigen, 1803
- Oblitoneura Mesnil, 1975
- Periostoma Cortés, 1986
- Pradocania Tschorsnig, 1997
- Psalidoxena Villeneuve, 1941
- Pseudobrullaea Mesnil, 1957
- Takanoella Baranov, 1935
- Truphia Malloch, 1930
- Weberia Robineau-Desvoidy, 1830
Tribe Parerigonini
- Parerigone Brauer, 1898
- Paropesia Mesnil, 1970
- Zambesomima Mesnil, 1967
Tribe Phasiini
- Compsoptesis Villeneuve, 1915/
- Elomya Robineau-Desvoidy, 1830
- Euscopoliopteryx Townsend, 1917
- Perigymnosoma Villeneuve, 1929
- Phasia Latreille, 1804
- Saralba Walker, 1865
- Subclytia Pandellé, 1894
Tribe Strongygastrini
- Arcona Richter, 1988
- Melastrongygaster Shima, 2015
- Opesia Robineau-Desvoidy, 1863
- Rondaniooestrus Villeneuve, 1916
- Strongygaster Macquart, 1834
- Vanderwulpella Townsend, 1919
Tribe Xystini
- Xysta Meigen, 1924
Tribe Zitini
- Leverella Baranov, 1934
- Zita Curran, 1927
Unplaced genus of Phasiinae
- Shannonomyiella Townsend, 1939
