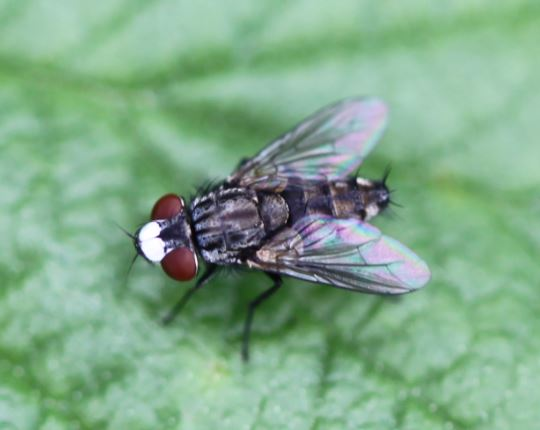
- Metopia argyrocephala

Scientific classification
- Kingdom: Animalia
- Phylum: Arthropoda
- Class: Insecta
- Order: Diptera
- Family: Sarcophagidae
- Subfamily: Miltogramminae
- Genus: Metopia; Meigen, 1803

= Metopia =

Genus of flies

Metopia is a genus of satellite flies in the family Sarcophagidae. There are at least 50 described species in Metopia.

== Species ==
These 51 species belong to the genus Metopia:

- M. albifrons (Linnaeus, 1761)^{c g}
- M. argentata Macquart, 1851^{c g}
- M. argyrocephala (Meigen, 1824)^{c g i b}
- M. aurigans Pape, 1987^{c g}
- M. auripulvera Chao & Zhang, 1988^{c g}
- M. benoiti Zumpt, 1961^{c g}
- M. biseriata (Macquart, 1851)^{c g}
- M. brasiliana (Townsend, 1929)^{c g}
- M. brincki Zumpt, 1959^{c g}
- M. campestris (Fallén, 1810)^{c g}
- M. convexinevris (Macquart, 1851)^{c g}
- M. crassarista Pape, 1986^{c g}
- M. cubitosetigera Pape, 1987^{c g}
- M. deficiens Villeneuve, 1936^{c g}
- M. fastuosa (Meigen, 1824)^{c g}
- M. flava Pape, 1987^{c g}
- M. frontalis (Latreille, 1802)^{c g}
- M. grandii Venturi, 1953^{c g}
- M. grisea (Robineau-Desvoidy, 1830)^{c g}
- M. hispidimana Pape, 1987^{c g}
- M. inermis Allen, 1926^{c g}
- M. italiana Pape, 1985^{c g}
- M. juquiana (Townsend, 1934)^{c g}
- M. krombeini Sabrosky, 1953^{c g}
- M. labiata (Fabricius, 1787)^{c g}
- M. lateralis (Macquart, 1848)^{c g}
- M. lateropili Allen, 1926^{c g}
- M. lucipeda Reinhard, 1961^{c g}
- M. malgache Zumpt, 1964^{c g}
- M. monunguis Pape, 1986^{c g}
- M. natalensis (Zumpt, 1961)^{c g}
- M. nudibasis (Malloch, 1930)^{c g}
- M. opaca Allen, 1926^{c g i}
- M. palliceps (Bigot, 1881)^{c g}
- M. pauciseta Dodge, 1966^{c g}
- M. perpendicularis Wulp, 1890^{c g}
- M. pilosarista Pape, 1986^{c g}
- M. polita (Townsend, 1935)^{c g}
- M. pollenia Chao & Zhang, 1988^{c g}
- M. pulverulenta Pape, 1987^{c g}
- M. rubricornis (Macquart, 1851)^{c g}
- M. sauteri (Townsend, 1933)^{c g}
- M. sinensis Pape, 1986^{c g}
- M. sinipalpis Allen, 1926^{c g}
- M. sinuata (Macquart, 1851)^{c g}
- M. staegerii Rondani, 1859^{c g}
- M. suifenhoensis Fan, 1965^{c g}
- M. togashii Kurahashi, 2004^{c g}
- M. tshernovae Rohdendorf, 1955^{c g}
- M. yunnanica Chao & Zhang, 1988^{c g}
- M. zenigoi Kurahashi, 1970^{c g}

Data sources: i = ITIS, c = Catalogue of Life, g = GBIF, b = Bugguide.net
