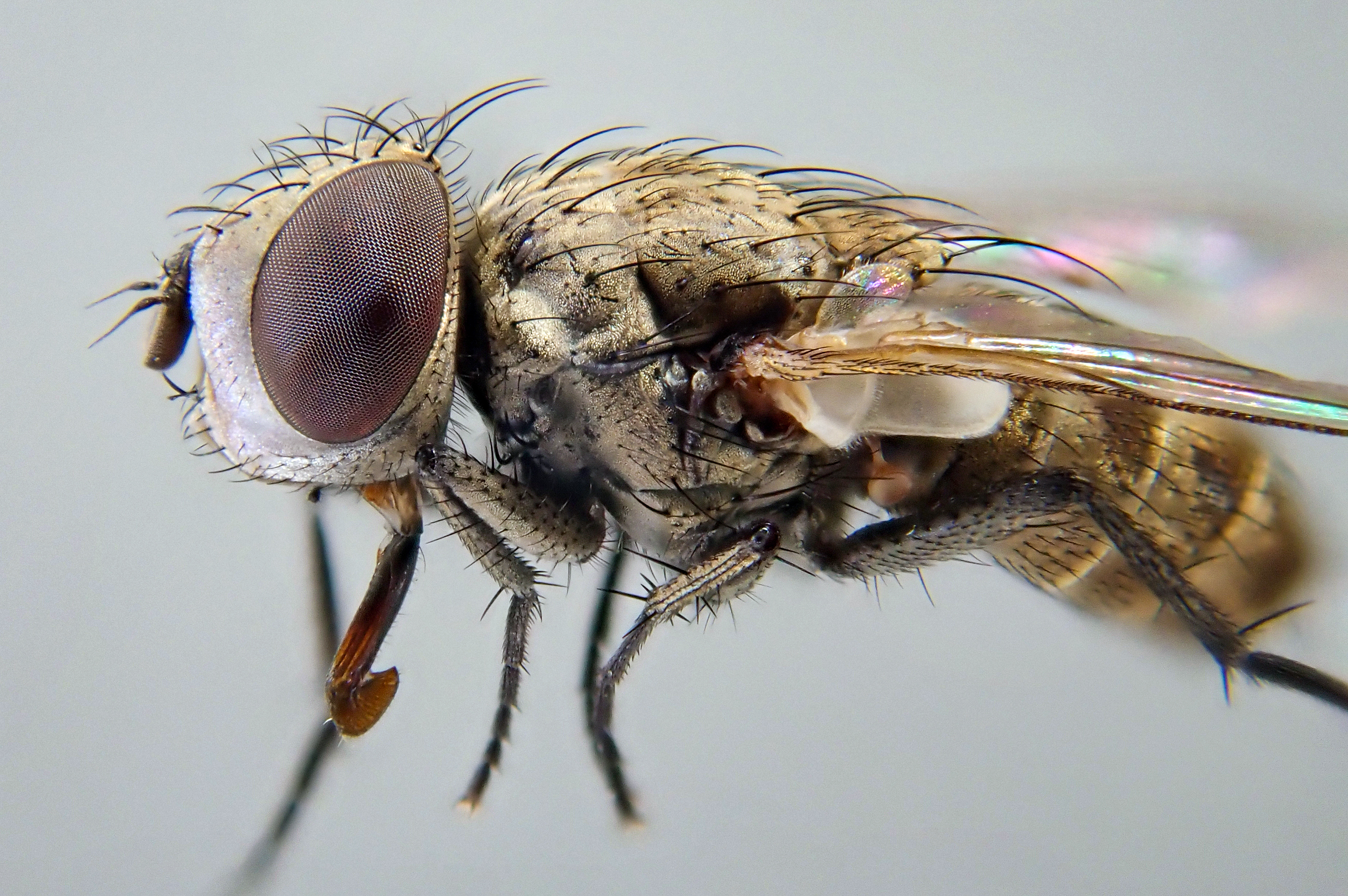
- Image of a female Senotainia conica

Scientific classification
- Kingdom: Animalia
- Phylum: Arthropoda
- Clade: Pancrustacea
- Class: Insecta
- Order: Diptera
- Family: Sarcophagidae
- Subfamily: Miltogramminae
- Genus: Senotainia; Macquart, 1846

Type species
- Senotainia rubriventris Macquart, 1846

Synonyms
- Megaera Robineau-Desvoidy, 1830; Megoera Macquart, 1834; Senetainia Macquart, 1846; Senotaina Macquart, 1846; Sphixapata Rondani, 1859; Sphyxapata Bigot, 1881; Arrenopus Brauer & von Bergenstamm, 1891; Araenopus Williston, 1896; Stenotaenia Bezzi, 1906; Arrhenopus Bezzi & Stein, 1907; Euselenomyia Townsend, 1912; Eusenotainia Townsend, 1915; Microsenotainia Townsend, 1916; Nyctella Zimin, 1928; Myiapis Séguy, 1929; Chaetometopia Malloch, 1930; Nannosetulia Enderlein, 1934; Pariogymnia Enderlein, 1934; Poecilonychia Enderlein, 1934; Afrosenotainia Rohdendorf, 1935; Sphecopata Jacentkovský, 1936; Pariogymnia Enderlein, 1936; Plionychia Enderlein, 1936; Sphegapata Kloet & Hincks, 1945; Noditermitomyia Séguy, 1953

= Senotainia =

Genus of flies

Senotainia is a genus of satellite flies in the family Sarcophagidae. There are more than 70 described species in Senotainia.

== Species ==
These 76 species belong to the genus Senotainia:

- S. aegyptiaca Rohdendorf, 1935
- S. albifrons (Rondani, 1859)
- S. anamalaica Verves, 1988
- S. angolae Zumpt, 1976
- S. arabops (Séguy, 1953)
- S. arenicola Reinhard, 1963
- S. armenica Rohdendorf, 1935
- S. barchanica Rohdendorf, 1935
- S. beludzhistanica Rohdendorf, 1961
- S. brasiliensis (Townsend, 1929)
- S. caffra (Macquart, 1846)
- S. caspica Rohdendorf, 1935
- S. chivica Rohdendorf, 1935
- S. conica (Fallén, 1810)
- S. currani Zumpt, 1961
- S. cuthbertsoni Zumpt, 1952
- S. deemingi Zumpt, 1970
- S. deserta Rohdendorf, 1935
- S. dubiosa Zumpt, 1961
- S. efflatouni (Rohdendorf, 1935)
- S. egregia (Zimin, 1928)
- S. fani Verves, 1994
- S. fera (Robineau-Desvoidy, 1830)
- S. flavicornis (Townsend, 1891)
- S. fulvicornis (Wulp, 1890)
- S. fuscula Zumpt, 1976
- S. grisea (Villeneuve, 1916)
- S. himalayica Rohdendorf, 1966
- S. inyoensis Reinhard, 1955
- S. iranica Rohdendorf, 1961
- S. irwini Zumpt, 1973
- S. kansensis (Townsend, 1892)
- S. kozlovi Rohdendorf & Verves, 1980
- S. litoralis Allen, 1924
- S. mongolica Rohdendorf & Verves, 1980
- S. morula Zumpt, 1976
- S. murgabica Rohdendorf, 1935
- S. nana Coquillett, 1897
- S. navigatrix (Meijere, 1910)
- S. nigeriensis Zumpt, 1970
- S. nitidula (Bigot, 1881)
- S. nuda Zumpt, 1952
- S. opiparis Reinhard, 1955
- S. patersoni Zumpt, 1961
- S. pollenia (Curran, 1936)
- S. pretoria (Curran, 1936)
- S. puncticornis (Zetterstedt, 1859)
- S. ravilla Zumpt, 1961
- S. repetek Pape, 1996
- S. richteri (Rohdendorf, 1961)
- S. rognesi Verves, 1995
- S. rossica Rohdendorf, 1935
- S. rubriventris Macquart, 1846
- S. rufiventris (Coquillett, 1897)
- S. schaeuffelei (Rohdendorf, 1961)
- S. setulicosta Allen, 1926
- S. sibirica Rohdendorf, 1935
- S. similis (Townsend, 1891)
- S. sinopis Reinhard, 1955
- S. smithersi Zumpt, 1961
- S. stackelbergi Verves, 1979
- S. syczewskajae Rohdendorf & Verves, 1980
- S. tanzaniae Zumpt, 1976
- S. tedzhenica Verves, 1979
- S. tricuspis (Meigen, 1838)
- S. trifida Pape, 1989
- S. trilineata (Wulp, 1890)
- S. turkmenica Rohdendorf, 1935
- S. ulukitkani Kolomiets, 1979
- S. vigilans Allen, 1924
- S. wilkini Zumpt, 1961
- S. xizangensis Fan, 1981
- S. zaitzevi Verves, 1984
- S. zimini (Rohdendorf, 1961)
