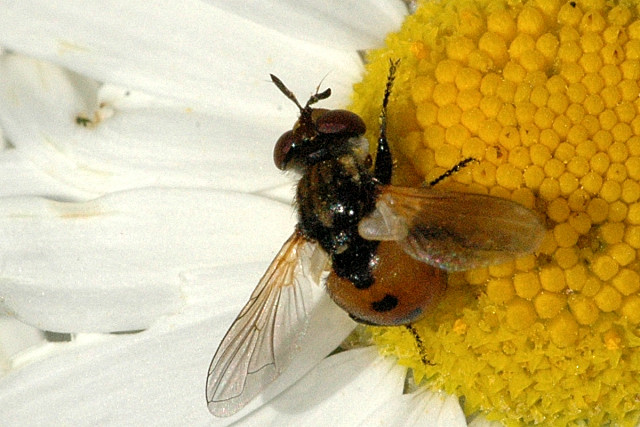
- Gymnosoma nudifrons male

Scientific classification
- Kingdom: Animalia
- Phylum: Arthropoda
- Clade: Pancrustacea
- Class: Insecta
- Order: Diptera
- Family: Tachinidae
- Subfamily: Phasiinae
- Tribe: Gymnosomatini
- Genus: Gymnosoma
- Species: G. nudifrons

Binomial name
- Gymnosoma nudifrons Herting, 1966

= Gymnosoma nudifrons =

Species of fly

Gymnosoma nudifrons is a species of fly in the family Tachinidae.

== Distribution ==
This Palaearctic species is present in most of Europe, Kazakhstan, Transcaucasia, Russia (to Far East) and China.

== Habitat ==
These flies mainly inhabit hedge rows, wet meadows and roadsides.

== Description ==
Gymnosoma nudifrons can reach a length of 5–7.5 millimetres (0.20–0.30 in). These parasitic flies have a black thorax and a spherical yellowish-red abdomen with reduced bristles and black markings, often large and triangle-shaped, sometimes touching. On the inner side of the eyes there are black stripes. The males of this species have yellowish dusting on the first part of the thorax. This species is very similar to Gymnosoma rotundatum.

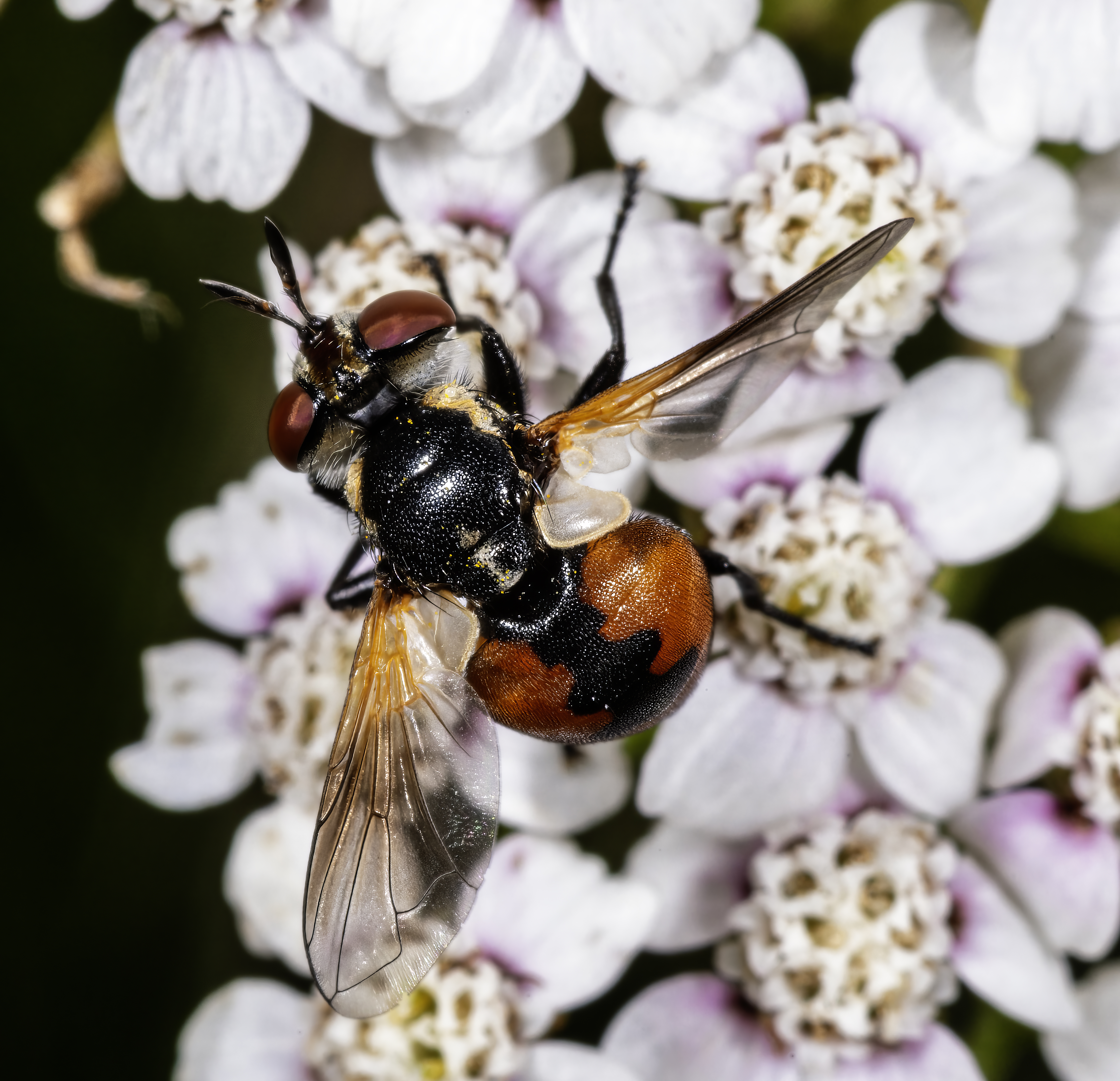
Female of Gymnosoma nudifrons on Viburnum tinus

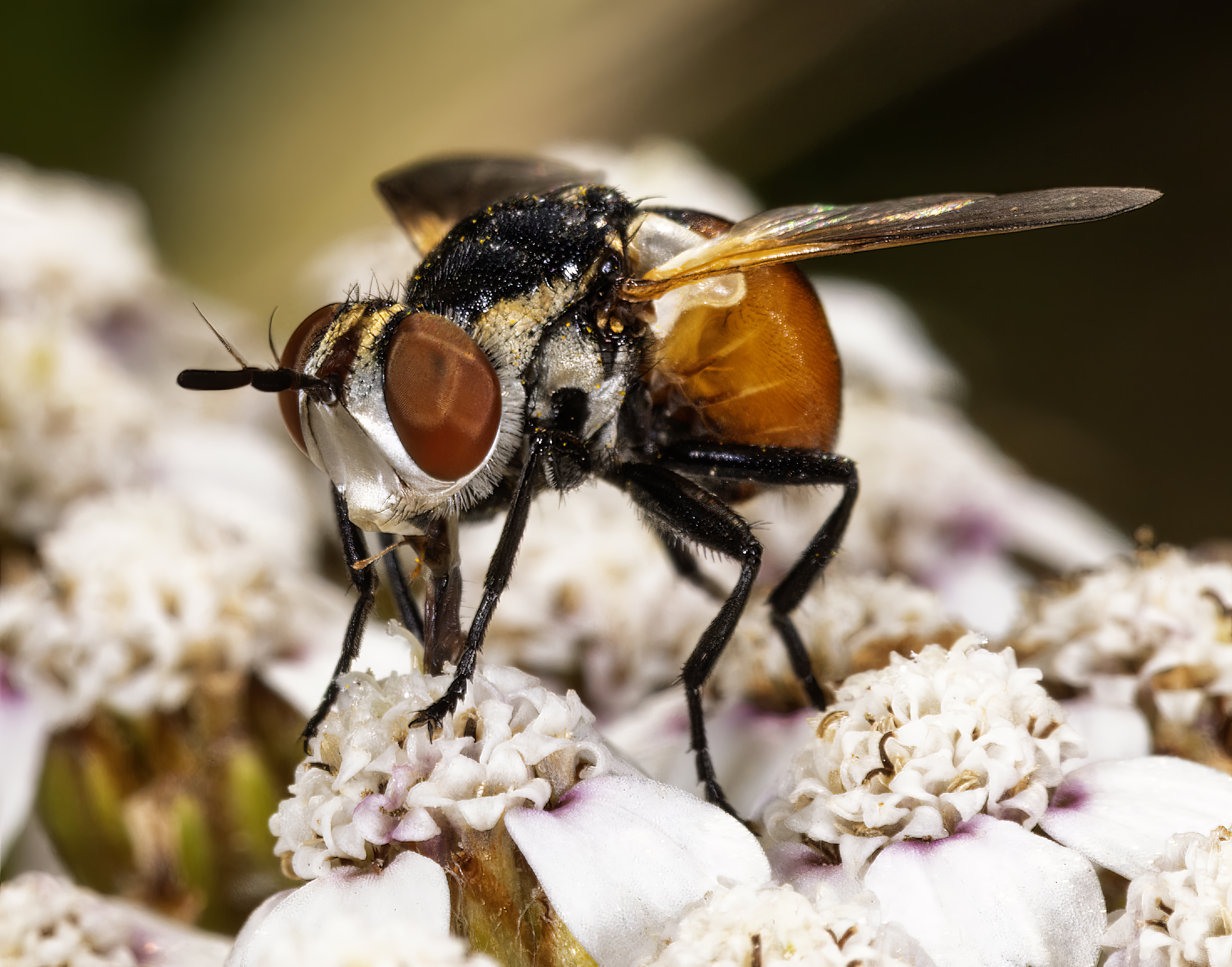
Female portrait

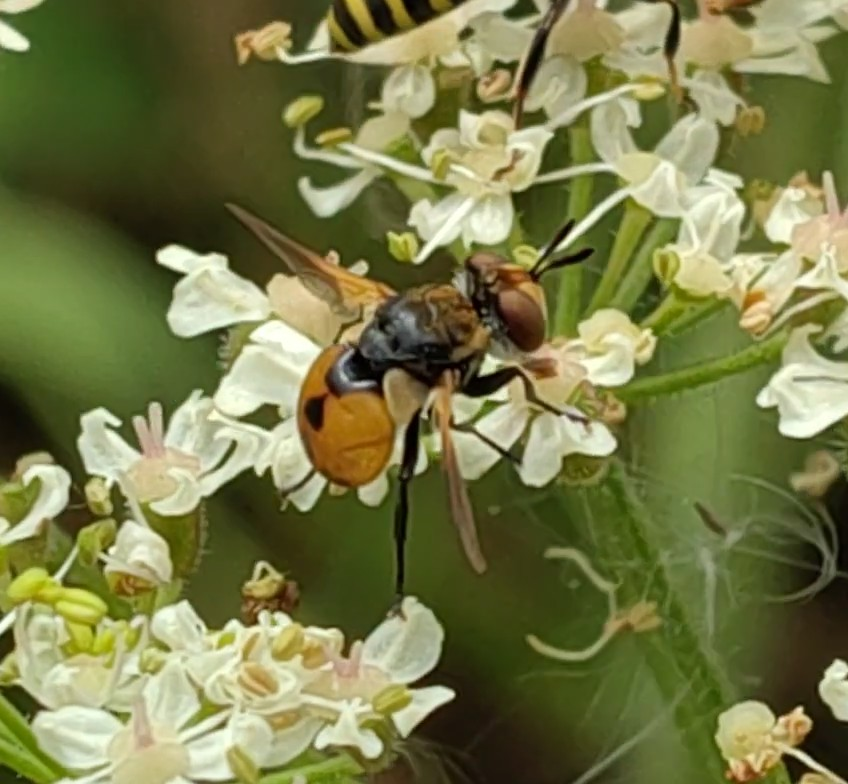
Gymnosoma nudifrons ♂

== Biology ==
Adults can be found from May to September. They feed on nectar and pollen of various flowers, especially of Angelica sylvestris, Tripleurospermum inodorum and Anthriscus species. Larvae feed on Pentatomidae.
