= G. maxima =

G. maxima may refer to:

- Gallotia maxima, an extinct lizard
- Glyceria maxima, a perennial grass
- Gonepteryx maxima, an Asian butterfly
- Gymnosoma maxima, a tachina fly
