= Cosmina =

Cosmina may refer to:

- Cosmina, a genus of flies
- Cosmina Dușa, Romanian footballer
- Cosmina Stratan, Romanian actress
- Cosmina de Jos and Cosmina de Sus, villages in Cosminele Commune, Prahova County, Romania
- Cosmina (river), Prahova County, Romania
