= Stegosoma =

Stegosoma may refer to:

- Stegosoma (fly), a genus of flies in the family Rhiniidae
- Stegosoma, a genus of tunicates in the family Oikopleuridae; synonym of Caudostegosoma
- Stegosoma, a genus of arachnids in the unknown family, described in 1873 by Cambridge
