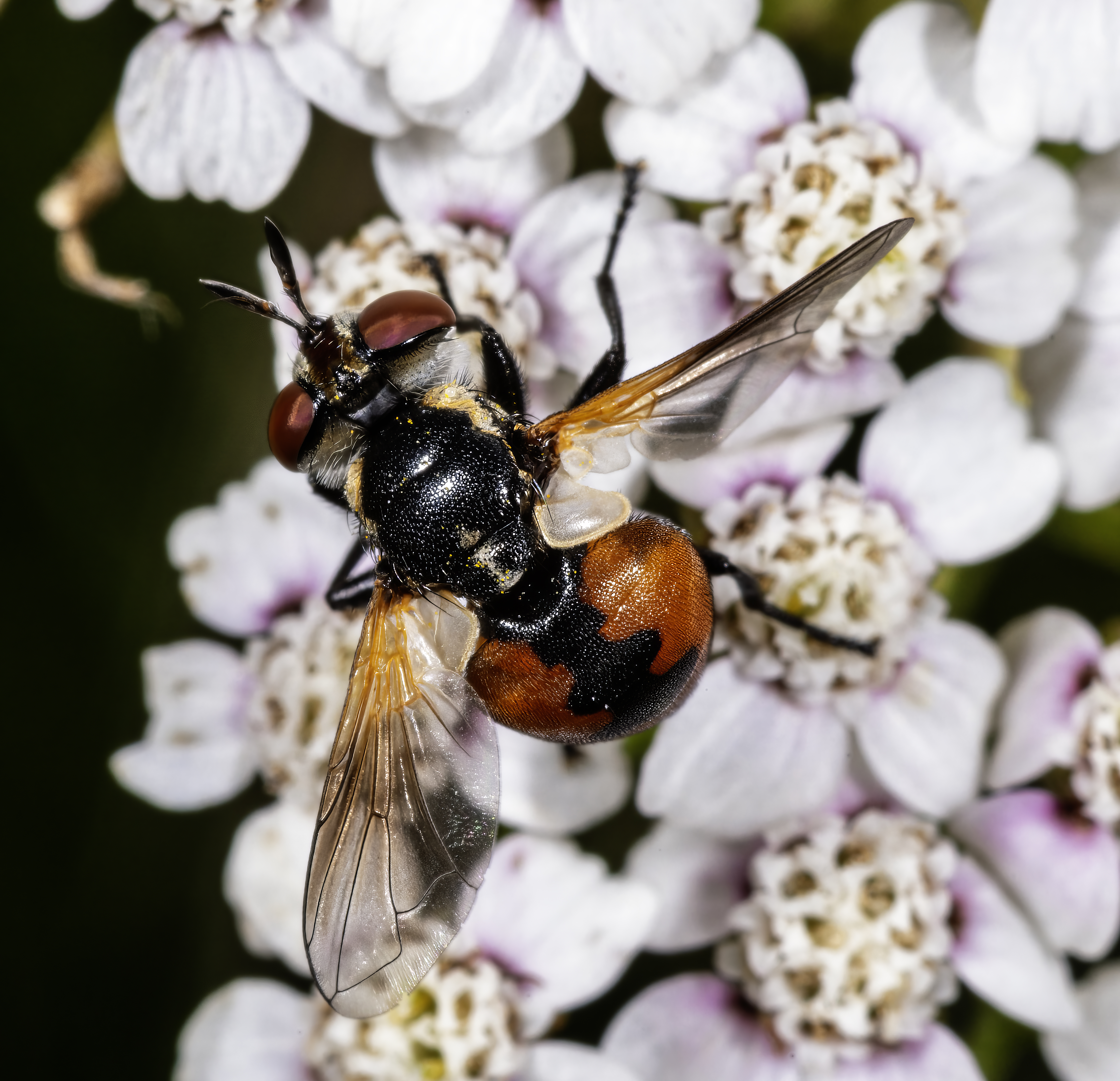
- Gymnosoma nudifrons

Scientific classification
- Kingdom: Animalia
- Phylum: Arthropoda
- Clade: Pancrustacea
- Class: Insecta
- Order: Diptera
- Family: Tachinidae
- Subfamily: Phasiinae
- Tribe: Gymnosomatini
- Genus: Gymnosoma; Meigen, 1803

Type species
- Musca rotundata Linnaeus, 1758

Synonyms
- Gimnosoma Rondani, 1862; Rhodogyne Meigen, 1800; Strawinskiomyia Dupuis, 1951; Stylogymnomyia Brauer, 1891

= Gymnosoma =

Genus of flies

Gymnosoma is a genus of flies in the family Tachinidae.

The name "Gymnosoma" literally translates as "naked body", and presumably refers to the fact that some species in the genus are less conspicuously bristly than most species of flies in the family Tachinidae.

== Species ==
- Gymnosoma acrosterni Kugler, 1971
- Gymnosoma amplifrons (Brooks, 1946)
- Gymnosoma brachypeltae Dupuis, 1961
- Gymnosoma brevicorne Villeneuve, 1929
- Gymnosoma canadense (Brooks, 1946)
- Gymnosoma carpocoridis Dupuis, 1961
- Gymnosoma clavatum (Rohdendorf, 1947)
- Gymnosoma costatum (Panzer, 1800)
- Gymnosoma desertorum (Rohdendorf, 1947)
- Gymnosoma dolycoridis Dupuis, 1961
- Gymnosoma emdeni (Mesnil, 1950)
- Gymnosoma filiola Loew, 1872
- Gymnosoma fuliginosa Robineau-Desvoidy, 1830
- Gymnosoma fuscohalteratum Emden, 1945
- Gymnosoma hamiense Dupuis, 1966
- Gymnosoma hemisphaericum (Geoffroy, 1785)
- Gymnosoma indicum Walker, 1853
- Gymnosoma inornatum Zimin, 1966
- Gymnosoma iranicum (Zimin, 1966)
- Gymnosoma majae (Zimin, 1966)
- Gymnosoma maxima Dupuis, 1966
- Gymnosoma neotropicale Cortés & Campos, 1971
- Gymnosoma nitens Meigen, 1824
- Gymnosoma nudifrons Herting, 1966
- Gymnosoma occidentale Curran, 1927
- Gymnosoma par Walker, 1849
- Gymnosoma persica (Mesnil, 1952)
- Gymnosoma philippinense (Townsend, 1928)
- Gymnosoma rotundatum (Linnaeus, 1758)
- Gymnosoma ruficornis (Wulp, 1892)
- Gymnosoma rungsi (Mesnil, 1952)
- Gymnosoma sicula Dupuis & Genduso, 1981
- Gymnosoma sylvatica Zimin, 1966
