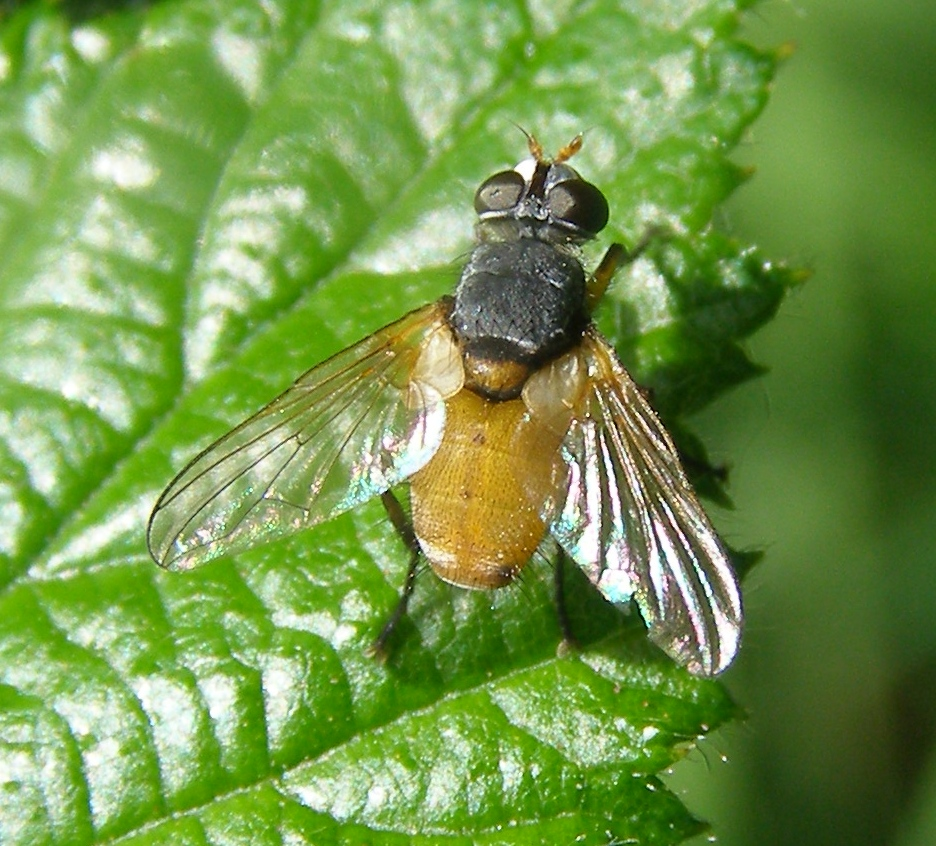
- Subclytia rotundiventris

Scientific classification
- Kingdom: Animalia
- Phylum: Arthropoda
- Class: Insecta
- Order: Diptera
- Family: Tachinidae
- Subfamily: Phasiinae
- Tribe: Phasiini
- Genus: Subclytia; Pandellé, 1894

Type species
- Tachina rotundiventris Fallén, 1820

Synonyms
- Borisia Rohdendorf, 1924

= Subclytia =

Genus of flies

Subclytia is a genus of flies in the family Tachinidae.

== Species ==
- Subclytia rotundiventris (Fallén, 1820)

== Distribution ==
British Isles, Czech Republic, Estonia, Hungary, Poland, Romania, Slovakia, Denmark, Finland, Norway, Sweden, Bulgaria, Italy, Austria, Belgium, France, Germany, Netherlands, Switzerland, Japan, Iran, Mongolia, Russia, Transcaucasia, China.
