= Senotainia rubriventris =

Scientific classification
- Kingdom: Animalia
- Phylum: Arthropoda
- Class: Insecta
- Order: Diptera
- Family: Sarcophagidae
- Subfamily: Miltogramminae
- Genus: Senotainia
- Species: S. rubriventris

Binomial name
- Senotainia rubriventris (Macquart, 1846)

Synonyms
- Miltogramma decisa Townsend, 1892; Sarcophaga rubriventris Macquart, 1851; Senotainia rubiventris Greathead, 1963; Setulia rubriventris Villeneuve, 1913

Species of fly

Senotainia rubriventris is a species of satellite flies (insects in the family Sarcophagidae).

== Distribution ==
Canada, United States, Bahamas, Jamaica, Puerto Rico.
