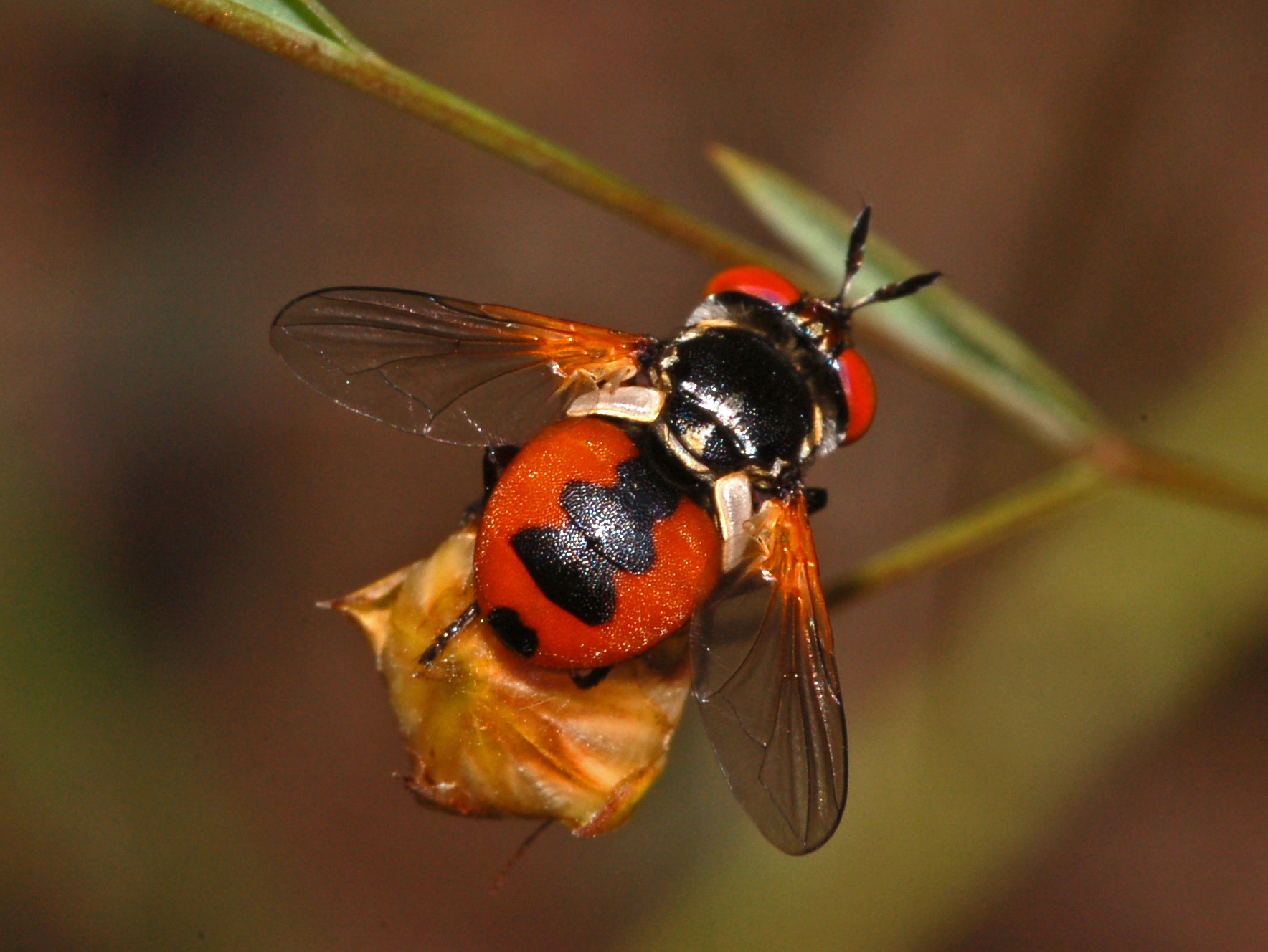
- Female of Gymnosoma clavatum

Scientific classification
- Kingdom: Animalia
- Phylum: Arthropoda
- Class: Insecta
- Order: Diptera
- Family: Tachinidae
- Tribe: Gymnosomatini
- Genus: Gymnosoma
- Species: G. clavatum

Binomial name
- Gymnosoma clavatum Rohdendorf, 1947

Synonyms
- Rhodogyne clavata Rohdendorf, 1947; Rhodogyne verbekei Mesnil, 1952

= Gymnosoma clavatum =

Species of fly

Gymnosoma clavatum is a species of tachinid flies in the genus Gymnosoma of the family Tachinidae.

== Distribution ==
Turkmenistan, Uzbekistan, China, Belarus, Czech Republic, Estonia, Hungary, Lithuania, Moldova, Poland, Romania, Slovakia, Ukraine, Denmark, Finland, Norway, Sweden, Albania, Andorra, Bulgaria, Corsica, Croatia, Cyprus, Greece, Italy, Macedonia, Portugal, Serbia, Slovenia, Spain, Turkey, Austria, Belgium, Channel Islands, France, Germany, Netherlands, Switzerland, Iran, Israel, Canary Islands, Russia, Azerbaijan.

It is not present in the United Kingdom.

== Description ==
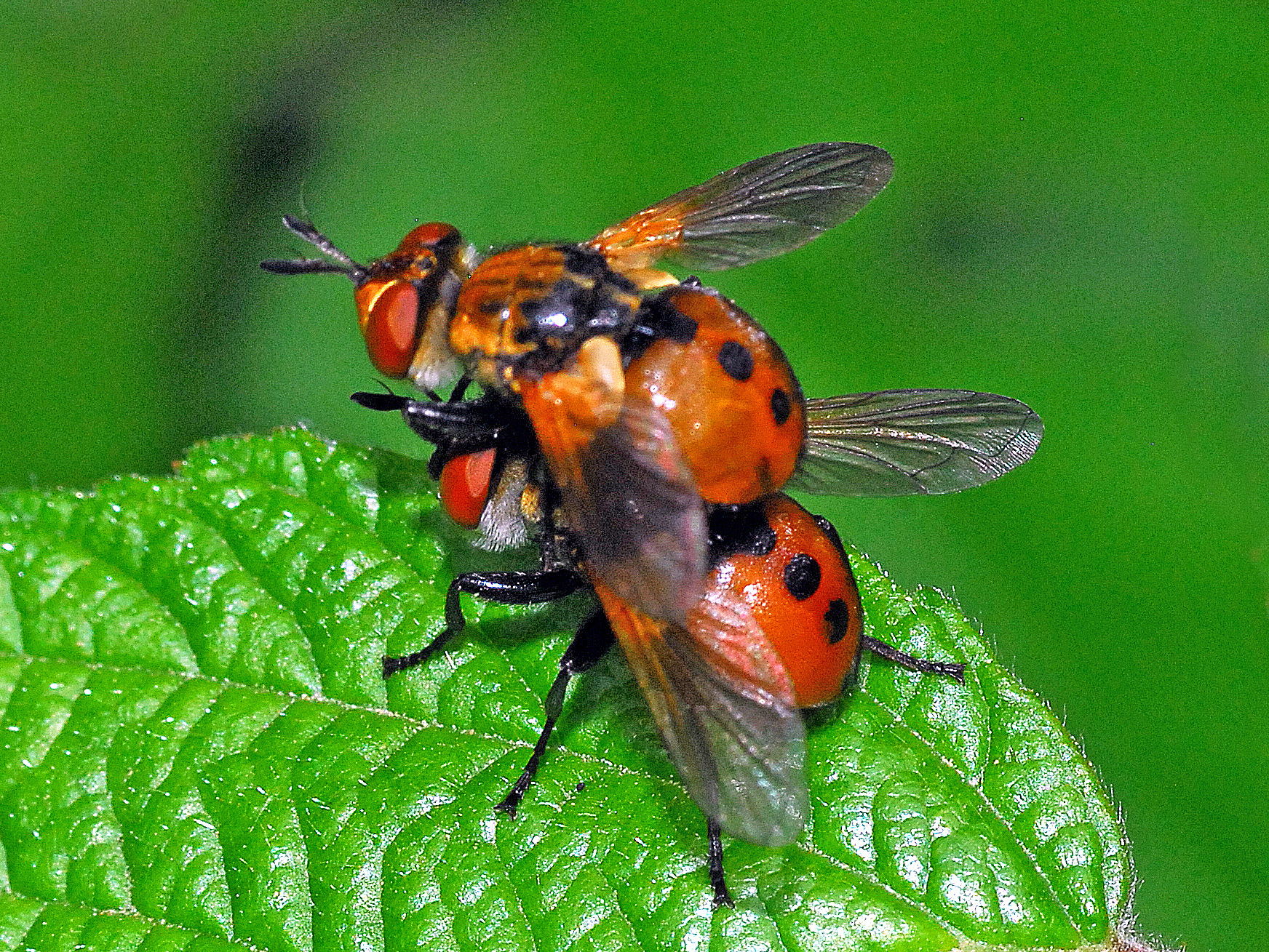
Mating couple

Gymnosoma clavatum can reach a length of 6–8 millimetres (0.24–0.31 in). These flies have a black thorax, but males have a mesonotum with golden pruinosity up to the transverse suture. Scutellum is black with two pairs of marginal setae and a quite characteristic red sub-globular abdomen, without setae but with large black markings in the middle. In the females thorax before the scutellum has three spots of dusting. Abdominal tergites are completely fused. The compound eyes are red. Antennae are black. Wings are slightly darkened, with yellow basicostae. Femora and tibiae are black.

== Biology ==
Adults can be found from May to October. These flies are endoparasites of various Pentatomidae species, on which the females lay their eggs. Larvae will develop inside them. Known larval hosts of these parasitic flies are Ancyrosoma leucogrammes, Carpocoris pudicus, Cydnus aterrimus, Dolycoris baccarum, Eurygaster integriceps, Nezara viridula, Palomena prasina, Piezodorus lituratus.
