= Senotainia litoralis =

Scientific classification
- Kingdom: Animalia
- Phylum: Arthropoda
- Class: Insecta
- Order: Diptera
- Family: Sarcophagidae
- Subfamily: Miltogramminae
- Genus: Senotainia
- Species: S. litoralis

Binomial name
- Senotainia litoralis Allen, 1924

Species of fly

Senotainia litoralis is a species of satellite flies (insects in the family Sarcophagidae).
