= Gymnosoma desertorum =

Scientific classification
- Kingdom: Animalia
- Phylum: Arthropoda
- Clade: Pancrustacea
- Class: Insecta
- Order: Diptera
- Family: Tachinidae
- Tribe: Gymnosomatini
- Genus: Gymnosoma
- Species: G. desertorum

Binomial name
- Gymnosoma desertorum Rohdendorf, 1947

Synonyms
- Rhodogyne desertorum Rohdendorf, 1947; Gymnosoma desertorum ssp. plesiomorpha Zimin, 1966

Species of fly

Gymnosoma desertorum is a Palaearctic species of fly in the family Tachinidae.

== Distribution ==
Turkmenistan, Uzbekistan, China, Belarus, Poland, Ukraine, Bulgaria, Cyprus, Italy, Serbia, Turkey, Kazakhstan, Iran, Mongolia, Russia, Armenia, Pakistan.
