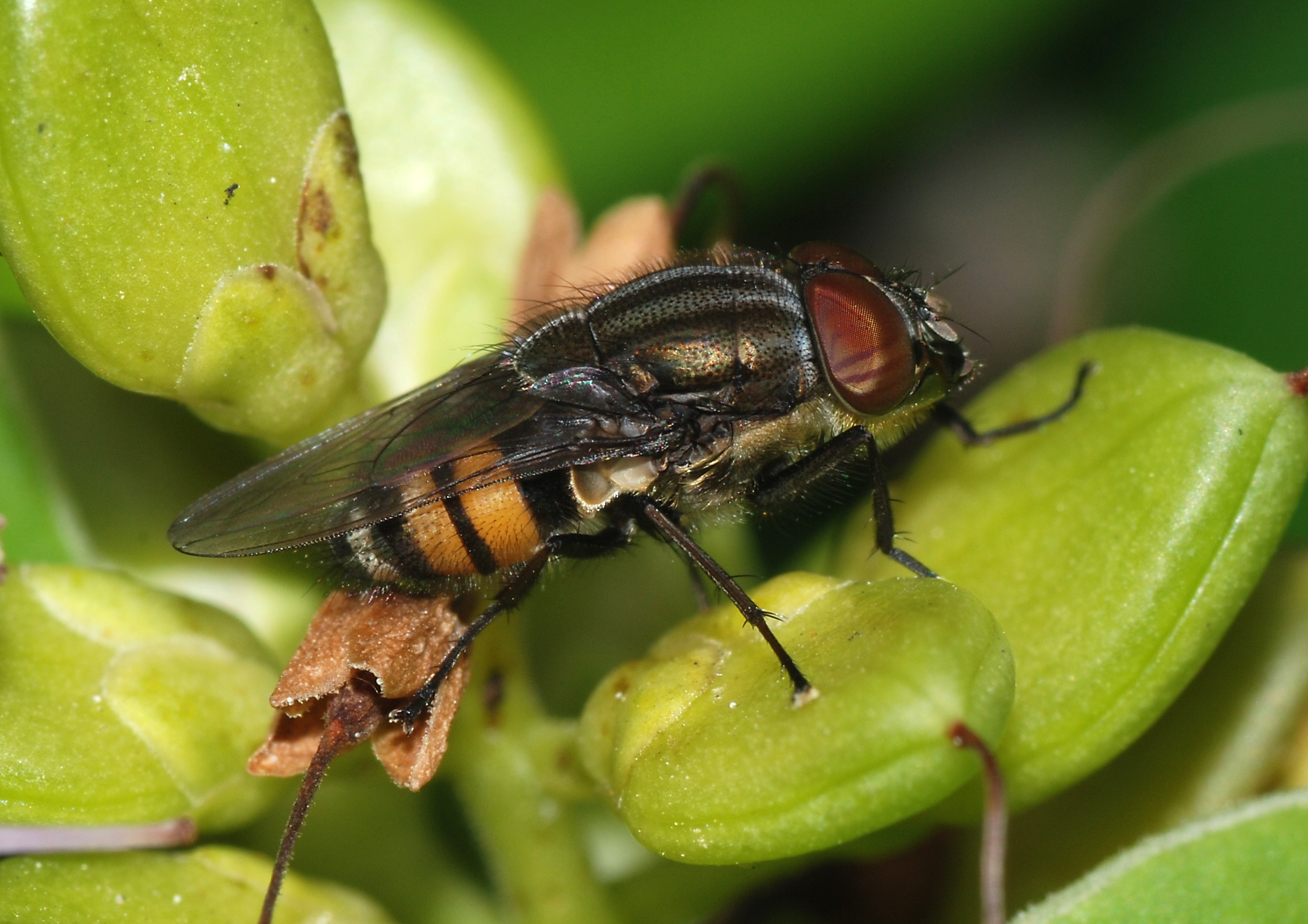
- Male

Scientific classification
- Kingdom: Animalia
- Phylum: Arthropoda
- Class: Insecta
- Order: Diptera
- Family: Rhiniidae
- Genus: Stomorhina
- Species: S. lunata

Binomial name
- Stomorhina lunata (Fabricius, 1805)

Synonyms
- Stomorhina selgae Lehrer, 1979

= Stomorhina lunata =

Species of fly

Stomorhina lunata is a species of fly in the family Rhiniidae first described by Johan Christian Fabricius in 1805.

== Distribution and habitat ==
This species is present in most of Europe, the Afrotropical realm, the eastern Palearctic realm, the Near East and North Africa, the Indomalayan realm, and the Nearctic realm. These flies usually inhabit meadows.

== Description ==
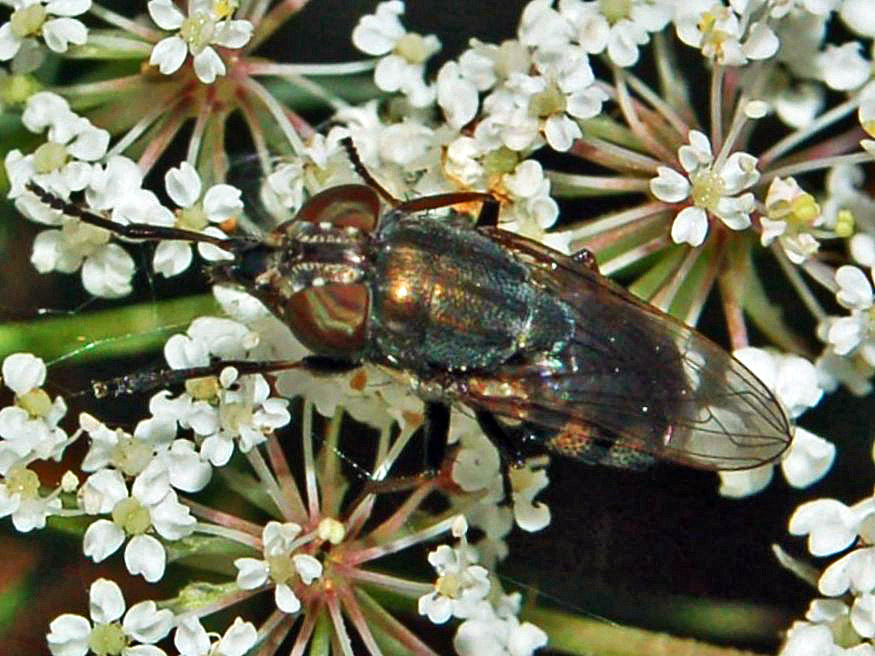
Stomorhina lunata, Dorsal view

Stomorhina lunata can reach a length of 5–9 millimetres (0.20–0.35 in) and a wingspan of 13–16 millimetres (0.51–0.63 in). These distinctive, medium-sized blowflies are rather similar to the house flies, but they have a characteristic prominent proboscis, a longitudinally striped thorax and an abdomen with yellow and black bands. Males have large orange patches on the sides of tergites 3 and 4, while females only show grey dust patches.

This distinctively marked species is often misidentified because of the unusual band pattern in the abdomen, typical of hoverflies.

Video clip. Female visiting flowers.

== Biology ==
Stomorhina lunata is an important egg predator of some major African agricultural pests, the South African brown locust (Locustana pardalina), the more widespread desert locust (Schistocerca gregaria), and the migratory locust (Locustana migratoria).

Adults are migratory and are present from July to October. They can usually be found feeding on nectar and pollen of umbellifer flowers (Apiaceae) and of Asteraceae species (mainly Scorzoneroides autumnalis, Tanacetum vulgare, Anthriscus sylvestris, Erysimum cheiranthoides, Filipendula ulmaria).
