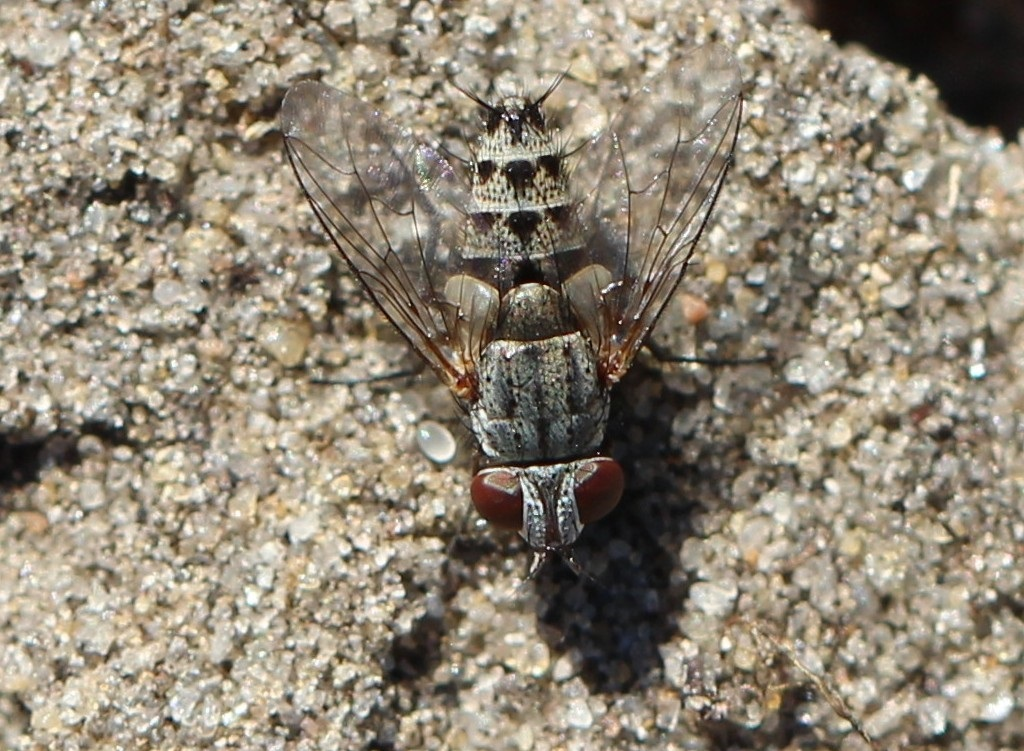
- Taxigramma heteroneurum

Scientific classification
- Domain: Eukaryota
- Kingdom: Animalia
- Phylum: Arthropoda
- Class: Insecta
- Order: Diptera
- Family: Sarcophagidae
- Subfamily: Miltogramminae
- Genus: Taxigramma; Perris, 1852

= Taxigramma =

Genus of flies

Taxigramma is a genus of satellite flies in the family Sarcophagidae. There are about 18 described species in Taxigramma.

== Species ==
These 18 species belong to the genus Taxigramma:

- T. albina (Rohdendorf, 1935)^{c g}
- T. aperta Rohdendorf, 1935^{c g}
- T. armeniaca Verves, 1980^{c g}
- T. biseta (Villeneuve, 1915)^{c g}
- T. elegantula (Zetterstedt, 1844)^{c g}
- T. gussakovskiji Rohdendorf, 1935^{c g}
- T. heteroneura (Meigen, 1830)^{i c g b}
- T. hilarella (Zetterstedt, 1844)^{b}
- T. jagnobica Rohdendorf, 1935^{c g}
- T. karakulensis (Enderlein, 1933)^{c g}
- T. kovalevi Verves, 1980^{c g}
- T. multipunctata (Rondani, 1859)^{c g}
- T. pluriseta (Pandellé, 1895)^{c g}
- T. pluton Verves, 1984^{c g}
- T. pseudaperta Séguy, 1941^{c g}
- T. richteri (Rohdendorf, 1961)^{c g}
- T. stictica (Meigen, 1830)^{c g}
- T. zimini Rohdendorf, 1935^{c g}

Data sources: i = ITIS, c = Catalogue of Life, g = GBIF, b = Bugguide.net
