= Senotainia caffra =

Scientific classification
- Kingdom: Animalia
- Phylum: Arthropoda
- Class: Insecta
- Order: Diptera
- Family: Sarcophagidae
- Subfamily: Miltogramminae
- Genus: Senotainia
- Species: S. caffra

Binomial name
- Senotainia caffra (Macquart, 1846)

Synonyms
- Lamprometopia caffra Macquart, 1846

Species of fly

Senotainia caffra is a species of satellite flies (insects in the family Sarcophagidae).

== Distribution ==
South Africa.
