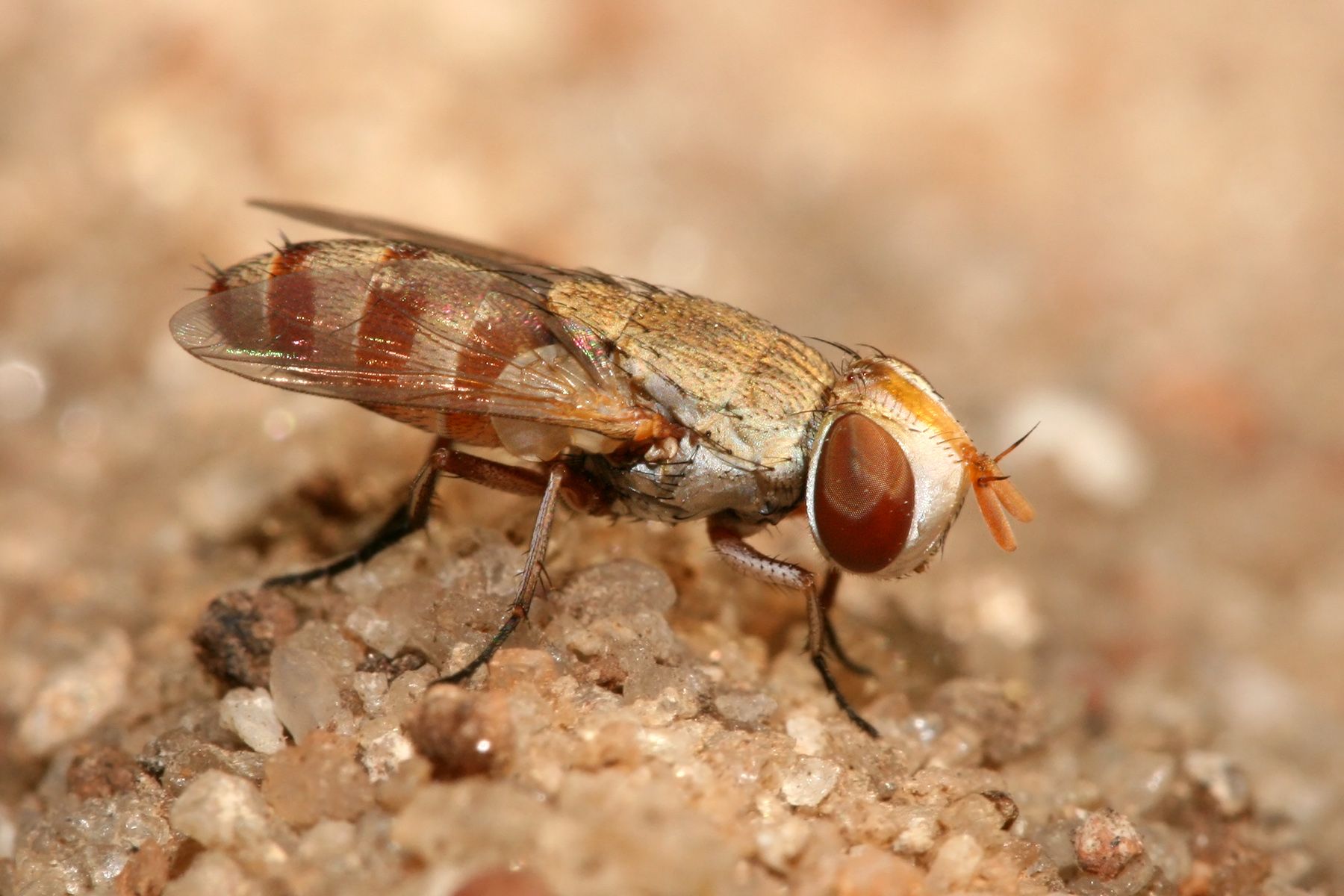
- Craticulina seriata

Scientific classification
- Domain: Eukaryota
- Kingdom: Animalia
- Phylum: Arthropoda
- Class: Insecta
- Order: Diptera
- Family: Sarcophagidae
- Subfamily: Miltogramminae
- Genus: Craticulina; Bezzi, 1906

Type species
- Nyctia frontale Pandellé, 1895

Synonyms
- Craticula Pandellé, 1895; Crataculina Schembri, Gatt & Schembri, 199; Craticulina Bezzi, 1906; Cratunculina Steyskal & El-Bialy, 1968

= Craticulina =

Genus of flies

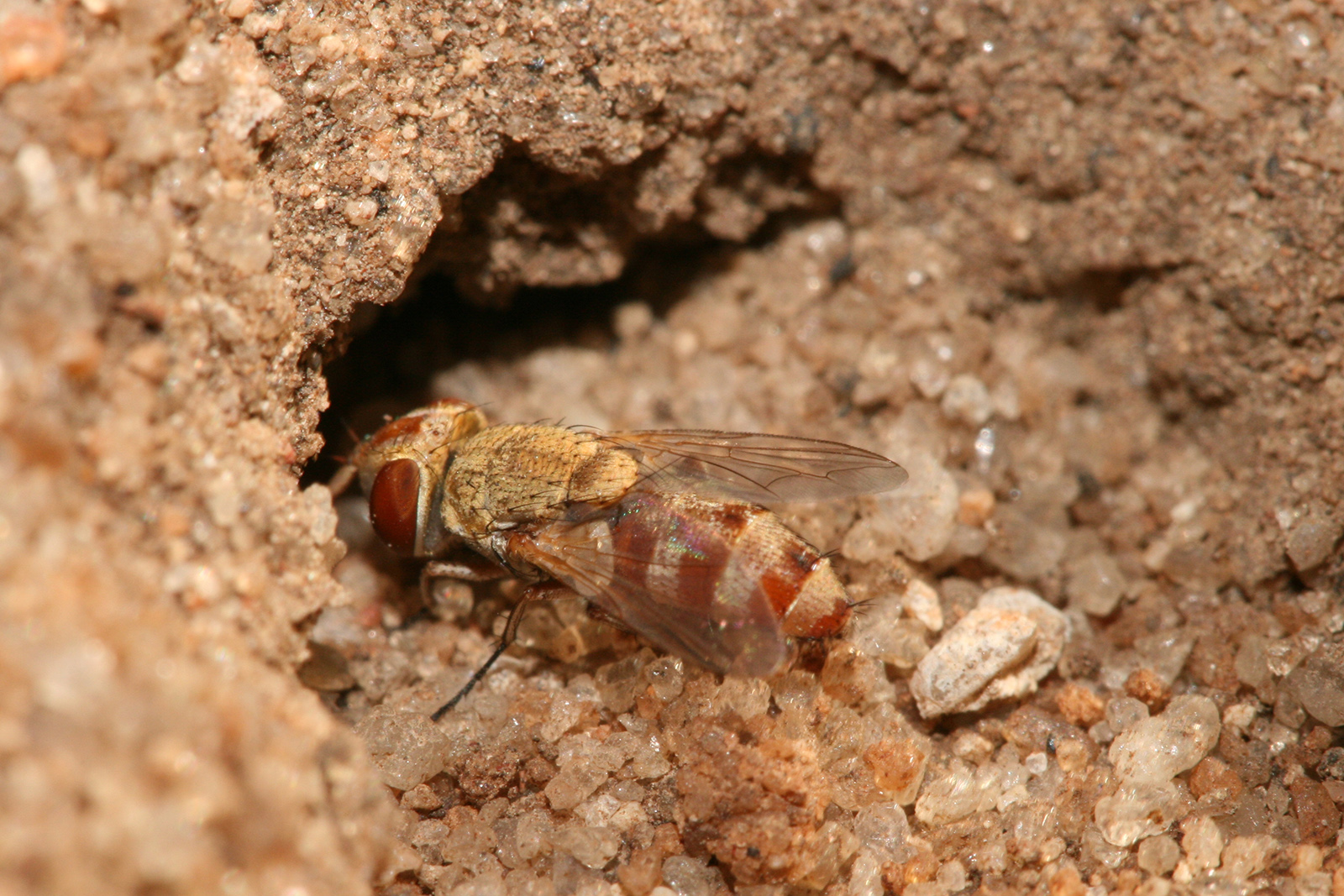
A Craticulina which has found the lair of a sand wasp

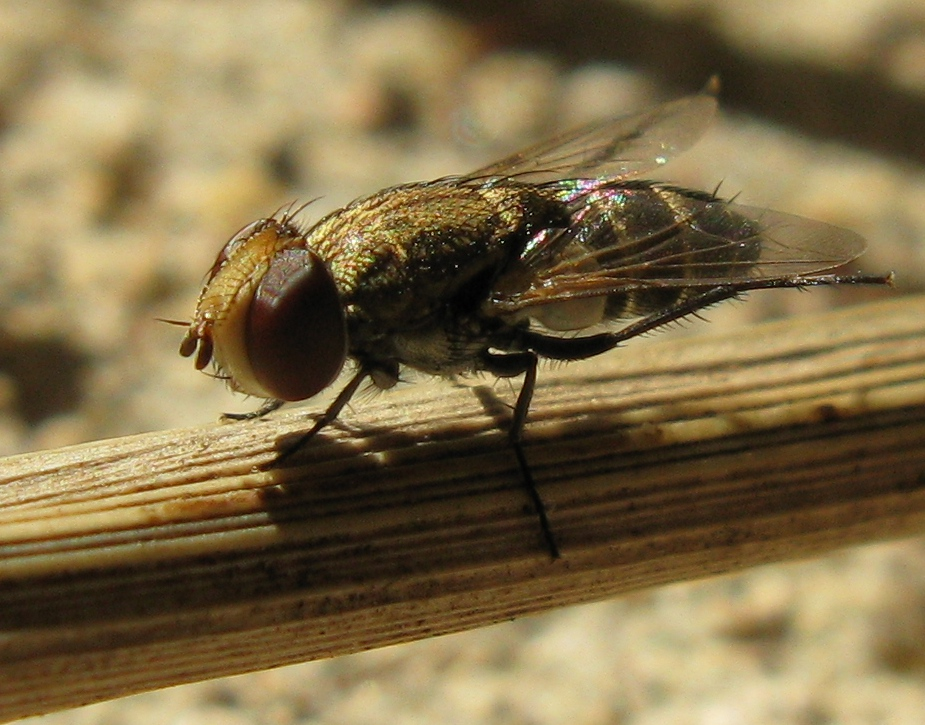
South African species of Craticulina, kleptoparasite of Philanthus, grooming with hind legs while awaiting host

Craticulina is a genus of true flies in the family Sarcophagidae. They are cleptoparasites of various species of sand wasps. They are ovoviviparous, laying larvae instead of eggs. The larvae share the prey of the sand wasp, and though they are much smaller than the wasps, many fly larvae may be present in each wasp larva, causing food to run short. Sometimes the fly larvae also attack the wasp larvae while they are small, especially if too many fly larvae and too little food are present.

The flies are sand coloured, which no doubt helps camouflage them, but at least some species of hosts take evasive action when Craticulina species are present, though it is not clear how effectively.

== Species ==
- C. antachates (Séguy, 1949)
- C. barbifera (Pandellé, 1895)
- C. bequaerti Venturi, 1958
- C. diffusa Villeneuve, 1934
- C. digressum Séguy, 1953
- C. fimbriata Bezzi, 1911
- C. genesae Verves, 2000
- C. gussakovskii Verves, 1993
- C. tabaniformis (Fabricius, 1805)
- C. transvaalensis Zumpt, 1961
- C. zimini Verves, 1993
