= Gymnosoma nitens =

Scientific classification
- Kingdom: Animalia
- Phylum: Arthropoda
- Clade: Pancrustacea
- Class: Insecta
- Order: Diptera
- Family: Tachinidae
- Subfamily: Phasiinae
- Tribe: Gymnosomatini
- Genus: Gymnosoma
- Species: G. nitens

Binomial name
- Gymnosoma nitens Meigen, 1824

Synonyms
- Gymnosoma latifrons Rondani, 1865

Species of fly

Gymnosoma nitens is a Palaearctic species of fly in the family Tachinidae.

== Distribution ==
Tajikistan, British Isles, Czech Republic, Estonia, Hungary, Lithuania, Poland, Romania, Slovakia, Ukraine, Andorra, Bulgaria, Corsica, Croatia, Greece, Italy, Portugal, Slovenia, Spain, Turkey, Austria, Belgium, France, Germany, Netherlands, Switzerland, Mongolia, Russia, Transcaucasia.
