= Gymnosoma hemisphaericum =

Scientific classification
- Kingdom: Animalia
- Phylum: Arthropoda
- Clade: Pancrustacea
- Class: Insecta
- Order: Diptera
- Family: Tachinidae
- Subfamily: Phasiinae
- Tribe: Gymnosomatini
- Genus: Gymnosoma
- Species: G. hemisphaericum

Binomial name
- Gymnosoma hemisphaericum (Geoffroy, 1785)

Synonyms
- Musca hemisphaerica Geoffroy, 1785

Species of fly

Gymnosoma hemisphaericum is a species of fly in the family Tachinidae.

== Distribution ==
France
