= Gymnosoma persica =

Scientific classification
- Kingdom: Animalia
- Phylum: Arthropoda
- Clade: Pancrustacea
- Class: Insecta
- Order: Diptera
- Family: Tachinidae
- Subfamily: Phasiinae
- Tribe: Gymnosomatini
- Genus: Gymnosoma
- Species: G. persica

Binomial name
- Gymnosoma persica (Mesnil, 1952)

Synonyms
- Rhodogyne persicum Mesnil, 1952; Gymnosoma desertorum f. pulchra Zimin, 1966

Species of fly

Gymnosoma persica is a Palaearctic species of fly in the family Tachinidae.

== Distribution ==
Turkmenistan, Iran.
