= Gymnosoma indicum =

Scientific classification
- Kingdom: Animalia
- Phylum: Arthropoda
- Clade: Pancrustacea
- Class: Insecta
- Order: Diptera
- Family: Tachinidae
- Subfamily: Phasiinae
- Tribe: Gymnosomatini
- Genus: Gymnosoma
- Species: G. indicum

Binomial name
- Gymnosoma indicum Walker, 1853

Species of fly

Gymnosoma indicum is an Asian species of fly in the family Tachinidae.

== Distribution ==
India, Taiwan.
