= Metallea =

Scientific classification
- Kingdom: Animalia
- Phylum: Arthropoda
- Clade: Pancrustacea
- Class: Insecta
- Order: Diptera
- Family: Rhiniidae
- Genus: Metallea; Wulp, 1880

Genus of flies

Metallea is a genus of flies.

== Species ==
Metallea contains the following species:

- Metallea albifacies
- Metallea ciliilunula
- Metallea clausa
- Metallea dispar
- Metallea erinacea
- Metallea flavibasis
- Metallea incisuralis
- Metallea insularis
- Metallea major
- Metallea minuta
- Metallea nigripilosa
- Metallea notata
- Metallea papua
- Metallea producta
- Metallea robusta
- Metallea setiventris
- Metallea setosa
