= Macronychia =

Scientific classification
- Domain: Eukaryota
- Kingdom: Animalia
- Phylum: Arthropoda
- Class: Insecta
- Order: Diptera
- Family: Sarcophagidae
- Subfamily: Miltogramminae
- Genus: Macronychia; Rondani, 1859

Genus of flies

Macronychia is a genus of satellite flies in the family Sarcophagidae. There are at least 20 described species in Macronychia.

== Species ==
These 21 species belong to the genus Macronychia:

- M. agrestis (Fallén, 1810)^{c g}
- M. agrestris ^{g}
- M. alpestris (Rondani, 1865)^{c g}
- M. aurata (Coquillett, 1902)^{i c g b}
- M. aurifrons Hall, 1937^{c g}
- M. auromaculata (Townsend, 1915)^{c g}
- M. confundens (Townsend, 1915)^{i c g}
- M. dolini Verves, 2005^{c g}
- M. griseola (Fallén, 1820)^{c g}
- M. kanoi Kurahashi, 1972^{c g}
- M. lemariei Jacentkovsky, 1941^{c g}
- M. lopesi Verves, 1983^{c g}
- M. malayana Kurahashi & Pape, 1996^{c g}
- M. ornata (Townsend, 1917)^{c}
- M. polyodon (Meigen, 1824)^{c g}
- M. richterae Verves, 2005^{c g}
- M. seguyi Verves & Richet, 2009^{g}
- M. striginervis (Zetterstedt, 1844)^{i c g}
- M. substriginervis Verves, 2005^{c g}
- M. townsendi Verves, 1983^{i c g}
- M. xuei Verves, 2005^{c g}

Data sources: i = ITIS, c = Catalogue of Life, g = GBIF, b = Bugguide.net
