= Gymnosoma amplifrons =

Scientific classification
- Kingdom: Animalia
- Phylum: Arthropoda
- Clade: Pancrustacea
- Class: Insecta
- Order: Diptera
- Family: Tachinidae
- Subfamily: Phasiinae
- Tribe: Gymnosomatini
- Genus: Gymnosoma
- Species: G. amplifrons

Binomial name
- Gymnosoma amplifrons (Brooks, 1946)

Synonyms
- Pallasia amplifrons Brooks, 1946

Species of fly

Gymnosoma amplifrons is a Nearctic species of fly in the family Tachinidae.

== Distribution ==
Canada, United States.
