= Macronychia aurata =

Scientific classification
- Domain: Eukaryota
- Kingdom: Animalia
- Phylum: Arthropoda
- Class: Insecta
- Order: Diptera
- Family: Sarcophagidae
- Genus: Macronychia
- Species: M. aurata

Binomial name
- Macronychia aurata (Coquillett, 1902)

Synonyms
- Amobia aurata Coquillett, 1902

Species of fly

Macronychia aurata is a species of satellite fly in the family Sarcophagidae.
