= Gymnosoma dolycoridis =

Scientific classification
- Kingdom: Animalia
- Phylum: Arthropoda
- Clade: Pancrustacea
- Class: Insecta
- Order: Diptera
- Family: Tachinidae
- Subfamily: Phasiinae
- Tribe: Gymnosomatini
- Genus: Gymnosoma
- Species: G. dolycoridis

Binomial name
- Gymnosoma dolycoridis Dupuis, 1961

Synonyms
- Gymnosoma dolycoridis f. meridionalis Zimin, 1966; Gymnosoma dolycoridis f. orientalis Zimin, 1966

Species of fly

Gymnosoma dolycoridis is a Palaearctic species of fly in the family Tachinidae.

== Distribution ==
Czech Republic, Hungary, Lithuania, Moldova, Poland, Romania, Slovakia, Ukraine, Finland, Sweden, Albania, Bulgaria, Croatia, Greece, Italy, Malta, Portugal, Spain, Austria, Belgium, France, Germany, Netherlands, Switzerland, Kazakhstan, South Korea, Russia, Transcaucasia, China, Pakistan.
