= Gymnosoma emdeni =

Scientific classification
- Kingdom: Animalia
- Phylum: Arthropoda
- Clade: Pancrustacea
- Class: Insecta
- Order: Diptera
- Family: Tachinidae
- Subfamily: Phasiinae
- Tribe: Gymnosomatini
- Genus: Gymnosoma
- Species: G. emdeni

Binomial name
- Gymnosoma emdeni (Mesnil, 1950)

Synonyms
- Rhodogyne emdeni Mesnil, 1950

Species of fly

Gymnosoma emdeni is a Palaearctic species of fly in the family Tachinidae.

== Distribution ==
Zimbabwe, Ethiopia, Kenya, Tanzania, Uganda.
