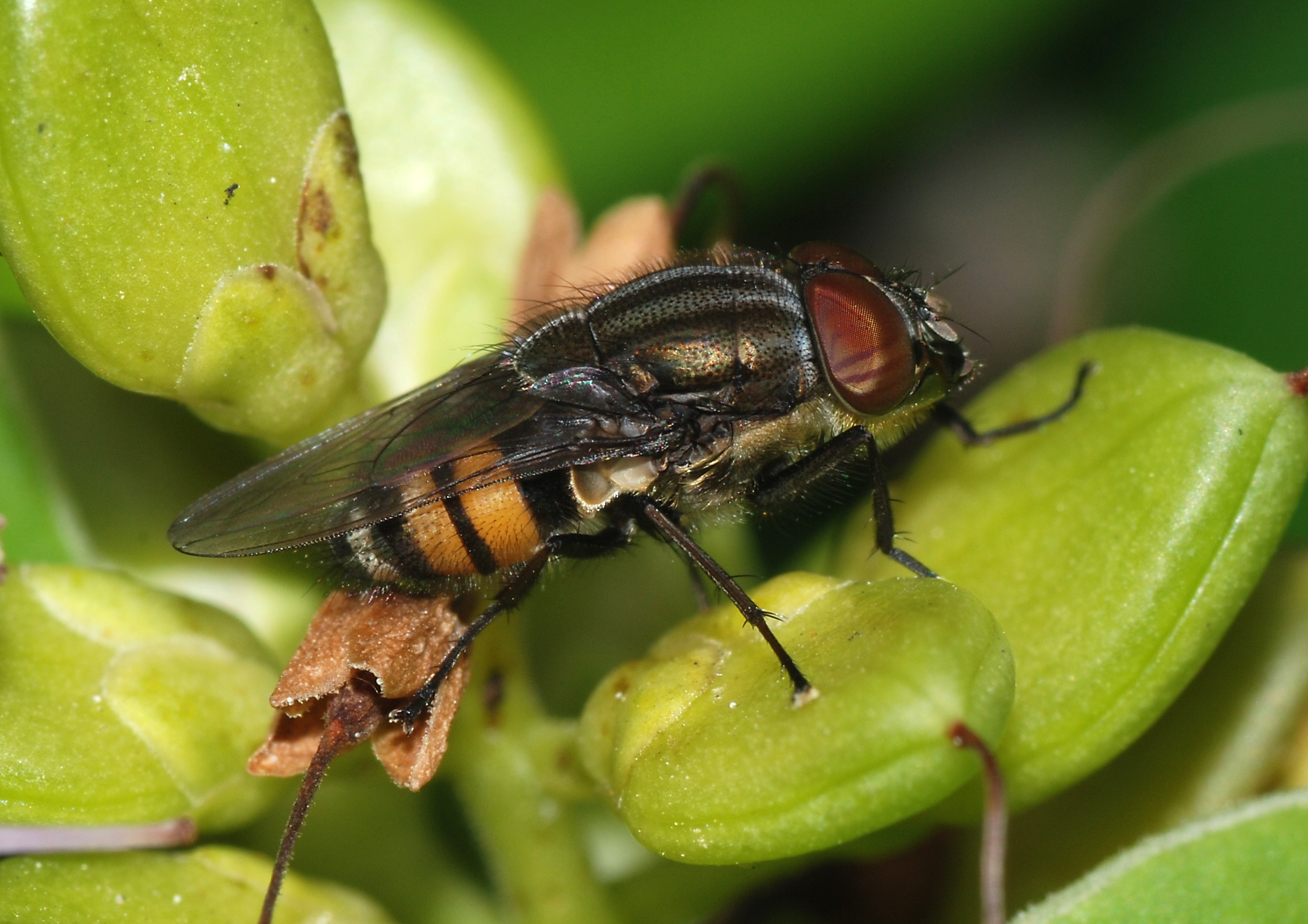
- Male Stomorhina lunata

Scientific classification
- Kingdom: Animalia
- Phylum: Arthropoda
- Clade: Pancrustacea
- Class: Insecta
- Order: Diptera
- Family: Rhiniidae
- Genus: Stomorhina; Rondani, 1861

Type species
- Musca lunata Fabricius, 1805

Synonyms
- Idia Wiedemann, 1820

= Stomorhina =

Genus of flies

Stomorhina (often misspelled as "Stomorrhina") is a genus of flies in the family Rhiniidae.

== Species ==
- Stomorhina apta Curran, 1931
- Stomorhina chapini Curran, 1931
- Stomorhina discolor (Fabricius, 1794)
- Stomorhina guttata Villeneuve, 1914
- Stomorhina lilitha Lehrer, 2007
- Stomorhina lunata (Fabricius, 1805)
- Stomorhina melastoma (Wiedemann, 1830)
- Stomorhina mulanjenia Lehrer, 2007
- Stomorhina neali Kurahashi & Magpayo, 2000
- Stomorhina norrisi Dear, 1977
- Stomorhina obsoleta (Wiedemann, 1830)
- Stormorhina pallida Malloch, 1927
- Stormorhina pollinosa Dear, 1977
- Stomorhina subapicalis (Macquart, 1847)
- Stomorhina townsendi Kurahashi, 1997
- Stomorhina veterana Villeneuve, 1927
- Stomorhina xanthogaster (Wiedemann, 1820)
