= Gymnosoma rungsi =

Scientific classification
- Kingdom: Animalia
- Phylum: Arthropoda
- Clade: Pancrustacea
- Class: Insecta
- Order: Diptera
- Family: Tachinidae
- Subfamily: Phasiinae
- Tribe: Gymnosomatini
- Genus: Gymnosoma
- Species: G. rungsi

Binomial name
- Gymnosoma rungsi (Mesnil, 1952)

Synonyms
- Rhodogyne rungsi Mesnil, 1952

Species of fly

Gymnosoma rungsi is a Palaearctic species of fly in the family Tachinidae.

== Distribution ==
Tajikistan, Turkmenistan, Uzbekistan, Belarus, Hungary, Romania, Ukraine, Bulgaria, Corsica, Croatia, Cyprus, Greece, Italy, Portugal, Spain, Turkey, France, Morocco, Russia, Transcaucasia.
