= Gymnosoma brachypeltae =

Scientific classification
- Kingdom: Animalia
- Phylum: Arthropoda
- Clade: Pancrustacea
- Class: Insecta
- Order: Diptera
- Family: Tachinidae
- Subfamily: Phasiinae
- Tribe: Gymnosomatini
- Genus: Gymnosoma
- Species: G. brachypeltae

Binomial name
- Gymnosoma brachypeltae Dupuis, 1961

Species of fly

Gymnosoma brachypeltae is a Palaearctic species of fly in the family Tachinidae.

== Distribution ==
Slovakia, France, Germany, Iran.
