= Gymnosoma iranicum =

Scientific classification
- Kingdom: Animalia
- Phylum: Arthropoda
- Clade: Pancrustacea
- Class: Insecta
- Order: Diptera
- Family: Tachinidae
- Subfamily: Phasiinae
- Tribe: Gymnosomatini
- Genus: Gymnosoma
- Species: G. iranicum

Binomial name
- Gymnosoma iranicum (Zimin, 1966)

Synonyms
- Stylogymnomyia iranica Zimin, 1966

Species of fly

Gymnosoma iranicum is a Palaearctic species of fly in the family Tachinidae.

== Distribution ==
Turkey, Iran.
