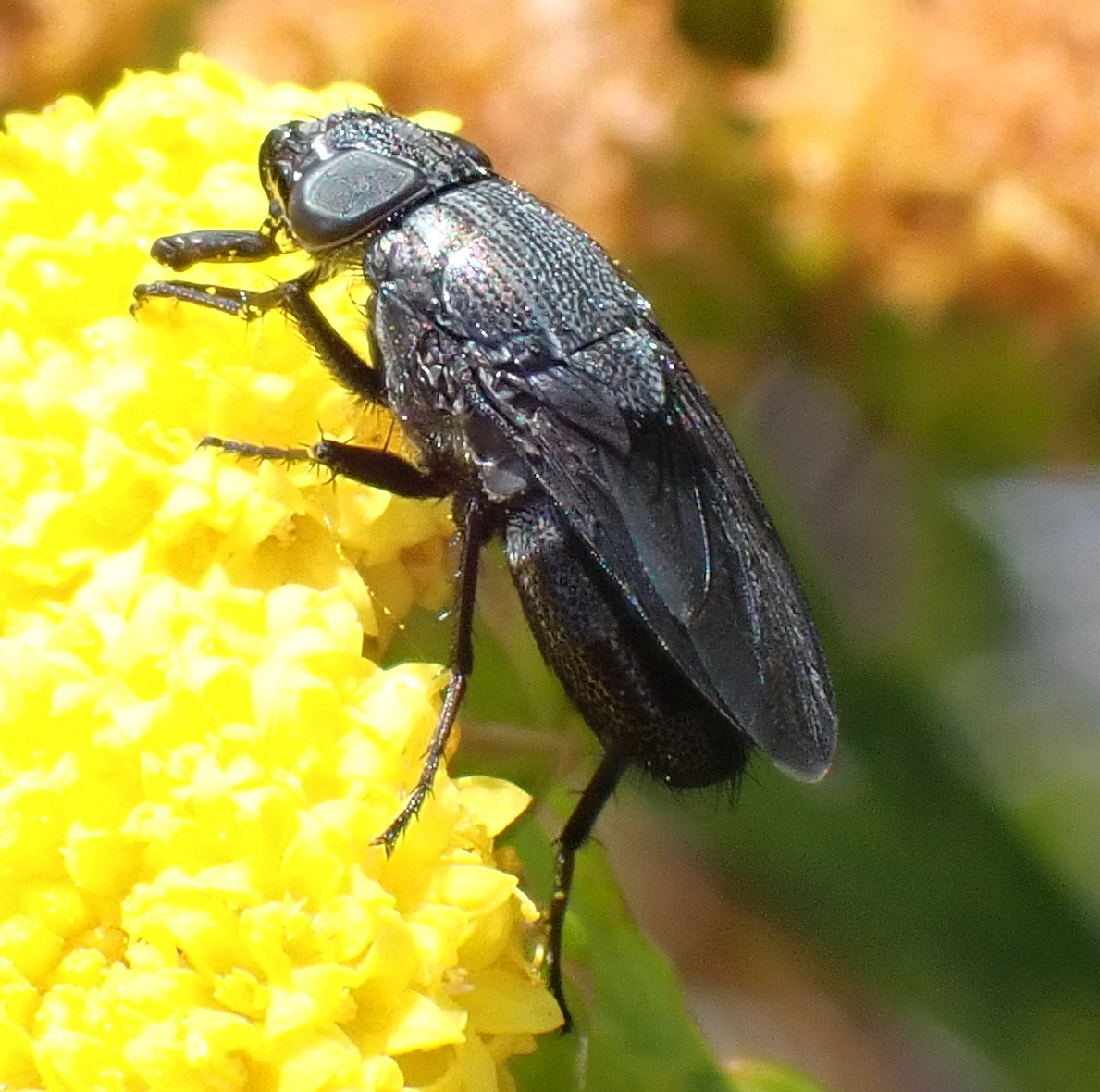
- Cosmina fuscipennis

Scientific classification
- Kingdom: Animalia
- Phylum: Arthropoda
- Clade: Pancrustacea
- Class: Insecta
- Order: Diptera
- Family: Rhiniidae
- Genus: Cosmina; Robineau-Desvoidy, 1830

Type species
- Cosmina fuscipennis Robineau-Desvoidy, 1830

= Cosmina (fly) =

Genus of flies

Cosmina is a genus of flies in the family Rhiniidae.

== Species ==
- C. acoma Séguy, 1958
- C. aenea (Fabricius, 1805)
- C. aethiopissa Séguy, 1958
- C. arabica Robineau-Desvoidy, 1830
- C. aucheri Séguy, 1946
- C. bagdadensis Mawlood & Abdul-Rassoul, 2008
- C. bezziana Villeneuve, 1932
- C. biplumosa (Senior-White, 1924)
- C. calida Bezzi, 1923
- C. claripennis Robineau-Desvoidy, 1830
- C. confusa Malloch, 1929
- C. coomani Séguy, 1946
- C. ebejeri Deeming, 1996
- C. fishelsohni Rognes, 2002
- C. fuscipennis Robineau-Desvoidy, 1830
- C. gracilis Curran, 1927
- C. griseoviridis (Bezzi, 1914)
- C. hainanensis Fang & Fan, 1988
- C. limbipennis (Macquart, 1848)
- C. madagascariensis (Zumpt, 1962)
- C. maindroni Séguy, 1946
- C. margaritae Peris, 1952
- C. maroccana Séguy, 1949
- C. metallina Becker, 1912
- C. nepalica Kurahashi & Thapa, 1994
- C. nigrocoerulea Malloch, 1926
- C. nipae Kurahashi, 1995
- C. par Zumpt, 1956
- C. petiolata Malloch, 1926
- C. pinangiana Bigot, 1874
- C. prasina (Brauer & von Bergenstamm, 1889)
- C. pseudoprasina Becker, 1912
- C. punctulata Malloch, 1926
- C. similans Becker, 1912
- C. simplex (Walker, 1858)
- C. testaceipes Peris, 1956
- C. thailandica Kurahashi, 1995
- C. undulata Malloch, 1926
- C. upembae Zumpt, 1967
- C. vanidae Kurahashi, 1995
- C. villiersi (Zumpt, 1964)
- C. viridia (Townsend, 1917)
- C. viridis (Townsend, 1917)
