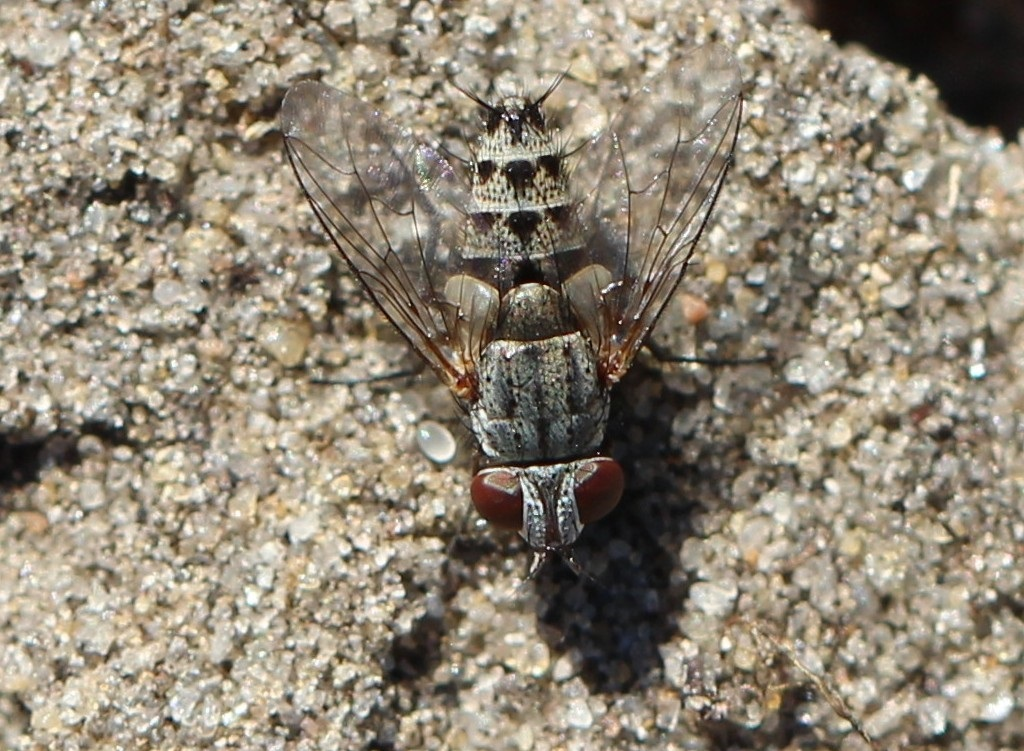

Scientific classification
- Domain: Eukaryota
- Kingdom: Animalia
- Phylum: Arthropoda
- Class: Insecta
- Order: Diptera
- Family: Sarcophagidae
- Genus: Taxigramma
- Species: T. heteroneura

Binomial name
- Taxigramma heteroneura (Meigen, 1830)

Synonyms
- Heteropterina nasoni Coquillett, 1895; Miltogramma heteroneura Meigen, 1830

= Taxigramma heteroneura =

Species of fly

Taxigramma heteroneura is a species of satellite fly in the family Sarcophagidae. It is found in Europe.
