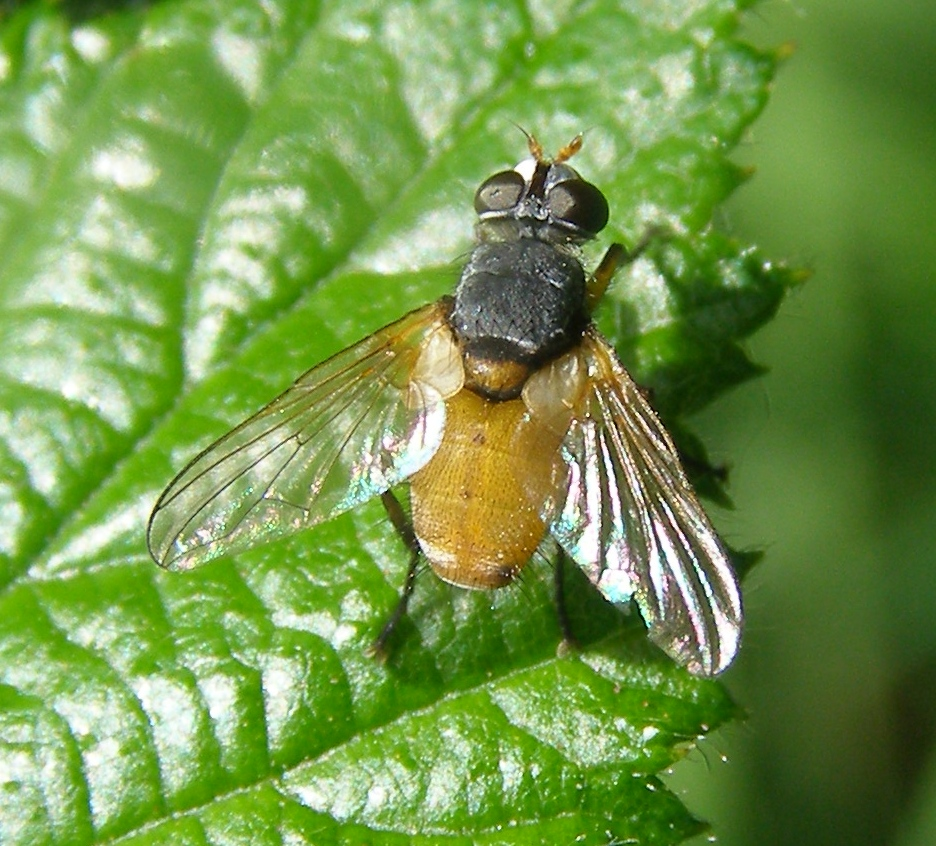
- Subclytia rotundiventris

Scientific classification
- Kingdom: Animalia
- Phylum: Arthropoda
- Clade: Pancrustacea
- Class: Insecta
- Order: Diptera
- Family: Tachinidae
- Subfamily: Phasiinae
- Tribe: Phasiini
- Genus: Subclytia
- Species: S. rotundiventris

Binomial name
- Subclytia rotundiventris Fallén, 1820

Synonyms
- Tachina rotundiventris Fallén, 1820; Clytia rotundicollis Robineau-Desvoidy, 1863

= Subclytia rotundiventris =

Species of fly

Subclytia rotundiventris is a European species of fly in the family Tachinidae.

== Distribution ==
British Isles, Czech Republic, Estonia, Hungary, Poland, Romania, Slovakia, Denmark, Finland, Norway, Sweden, Bulgaria, Italy, Austria, Belgium, France, Germany, Netherlands, Switzerland, Japan, Iran, Mongolia, Russia, Transcaucasia, China.
