= Gymnosoma ruficornis =

Scientific classification
- Kingdom: Animalia
- Phylum: Arthropoda
- Clade: Pancrustacea
- Class: Insecta
- Order: Diptera
- Family: Tachinidae
- Subfamily: Phasiinae
- Tribe: Gymnosomatini
- Genus: Gymnosoma
- Species: G. ruficornis

Binomial name
- Gymnosoma ruficornis (Wulp, 1892)

Synonyms
- Cistogaster ruficornis Wulp, 1892

Species of fly

Gymnosoma ruficorne is a Palaearctic species of fly in the family Tachinidae.

== Distribution ==
Mexico.
