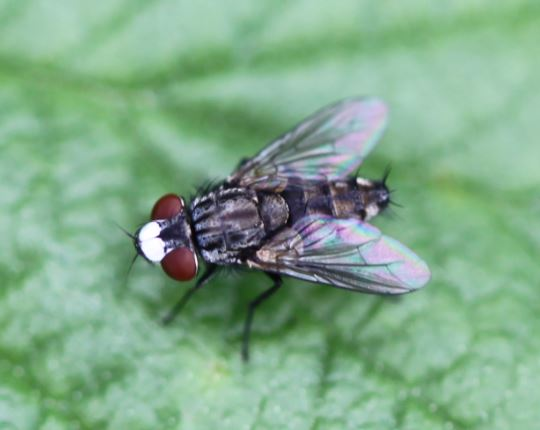

Scientific classification
- Domain: Eukaryota
- Kingdom: Animalia
- Phylum: Arthropoda
- Class: Insecta
- Order: Diptera
- Family: Sarcophagidae
- Genus: Metopia
- Species: M. argyrocephala

Binomial name
- Metopia argyrocephala (Meigen, 1824)

Synonyms
- Metopia luggeri Townsend, 1892; Musca leucocephala Rossi, 1790; Tachina argyrocephala Meigen, 1824

= Metopia argyrocephala =

Species of fly

Metopia argyrocephala is a species of satellite flies in the family Sarcophagidae. It is unusual among kleptoparasitic flies in that the larvae develop in nests of both bees and wasps.
