= Gymnosoma brevicorne =

Scientific classification
- Kingdom: Animalia
- Phylum: Arthropoda
- Clade: Pancrustacea
- Class: Insecta
- Order: Diptera
- Family: Tachinidae
- Subfamily: Phasiinae
- Tribe: Gymnosomatini
- Genus: Gymnosoma
- Species: G. brevicorne

Binomial name
- Gymnosoma brevicorne Villeneuve, 1929

Species of fly

Gymnosoma brevicorne is a species of fly in the family Tachinidae.

== Distribution ==
China, Taiwan.
