= Gymnosoma siculum =

Scientific classification
- Kingdom: Animalia
- Phylum: Arthropoda
- Clade: Pancrustacea
- Class: Insecta
- Order: Diptera
- Family: Tachinidae
- Subfamily: Phasiinae
- Tribe: Gymnosomatini
- Genus: Gymnosoma
- Species: G. siculum

Binomial name
- Gymnosoma siculum Dupuis & Genduso, 1981

Species of fly

Gymnosoma siculum is a Palaearctic species of fly in the family Tachinidae.

== Distribution ==
Italy.
