= Gymnosoma neotropicale =

Scientific classification
- Kingdom: Animalia
- Phylum: Arthropoda
- Clade: Pancrustacea
- Class: Insecta
- Order: Diptera
- Family: Tachinidae
- Subfamily: Phasiinae
- Tribe: Gymnosomatini
- Genus: Gymnosoma
- Species: G. neotropicale

Binomial name
- Gymnosoma neotropicale Cortés & Campos, 1971

Species of fly

Gymnosoma neotropicale is an Neotropical species of fly in the family Tachinidae.

== Distribution ==
Chile, Peru.
