= Gymnosoma inornatum =

Scientific classification
- Kingdom: Animalia
- Phylum: Arthropoda
- Clade: Pancrustacea
- Class: Insecta
- Order: Diptera
- Family: Tachinidae
- Subfamily: Phasiinae
- Tribe: Gymnosomatini
- Genus: Gymnosoma
- Species: G. inornatum

Binomial name
- Gymnosoma inornatum Zimin, 1966

Synonyms
- Gymnosoma inornata form agchista Zimin, 1966

Species of fly

Gymnosoma inornatum is a Palaearctic species of fly in the family Tachinidae.

== Distribution ==
Hungary, Poland, Romania, Ukraine, Albania, Bulgaria, Croatia, Greece, Italy, Malta, Serbia, Spain, Japan, South Korea, Russia, Azerbaijan, China.
