= Gymnosoma costatum =

Scientific classification
- Kingdom: Animalia
- Phylum: Arthropoda
- Clade: Pancrustacea
- Class: Insecta
- Order: Diptera
- Family: Tachinidae
- Tribe: Gymnosomatini
- Genus: Gymnosoma
- Species: G. costatum

Binomial name
- Gymnosoma costatum (Panzer, 1800)

Synonyms
- Musca costata Panzer, 1800; Gymnosoma intermedia Loew, 1869

Species of fly

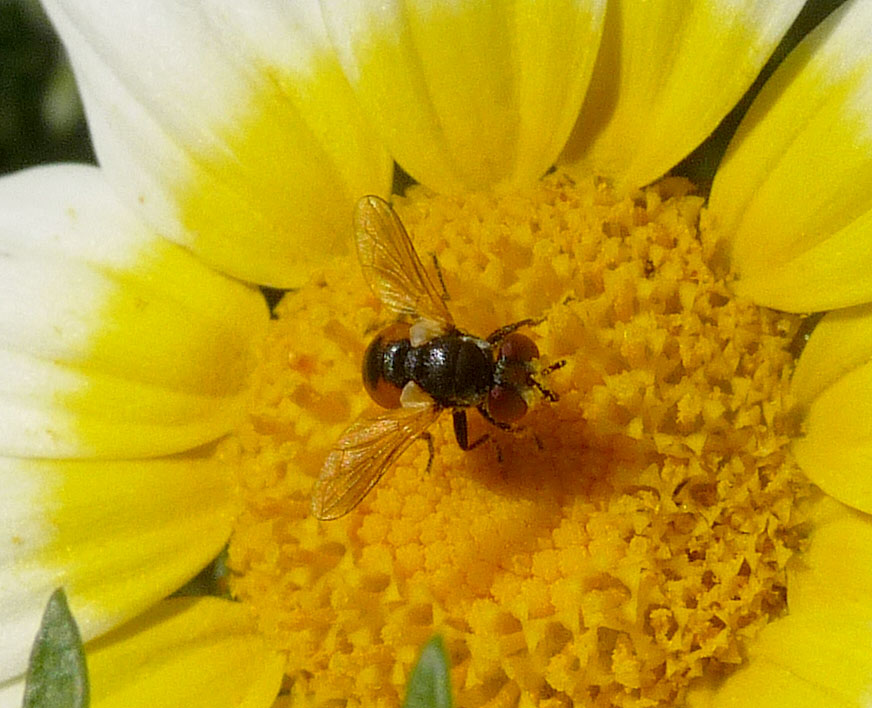
Gymnosoma Costatum

Gymnosoma costatum is a Palaearctic species of fly in the family Tachinidae.

== Distribution ==
Czech Republic, Hungary, Poland, Romania, Slovakia, Bulgaria, Croatia, Greece, Italy, Serbia, Slovenia, Austria, Belgium, France, Germany, Liechtenstein, Netherlands, Switzerland.
