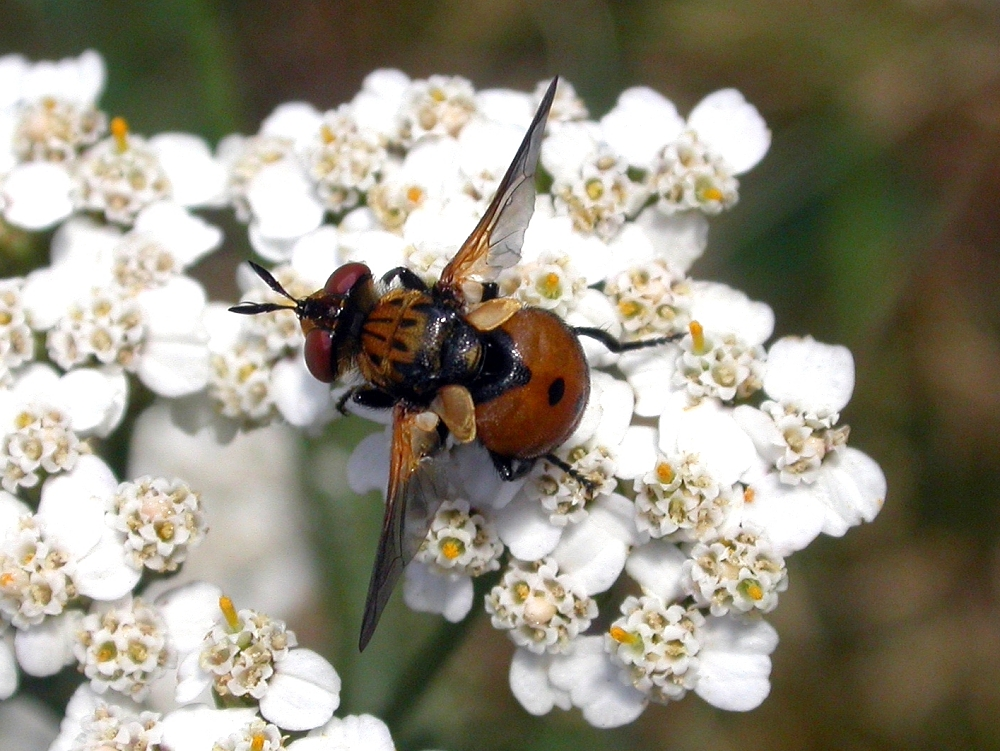
- Gymnosoma rotundatum

Scientific classification
- Kingdom: Animalia
- Phylum: Arthropoda
- Clade: Pancrustacea
- Class: Insecta
- Order: Diptera
- Family: Tachinidae
- Subfamily: Phasiinae
- Tribe: Gymnosomatini
- Genus: Gymnosoma
- Species: G. rotundatum

Binomial name
- Gymnosoma rotundatum (Linnaeus, 1758)

Synonyms
- Gymnosoma cerinum (Harris, 1776); Musca cerina Harris, 1776; Musca rotundata Linnaeus, 1758; Gymnosoma kuramanum Matsumura, 1916

= Gymnosoma rotundatum =

Species of fly

Gymnosoma rotundatum is a parasitoid fly found in Europe and Asia.

== Description ==
Gymnosoma rotundatum, sometimes referred to as a ladybird fly, is a small 5-6mm long fly. It has a dark thorax, golden in males, and a globular orange abdomen decorated with dark rounded markings along the midline. The base of the wings are yellow-brown.

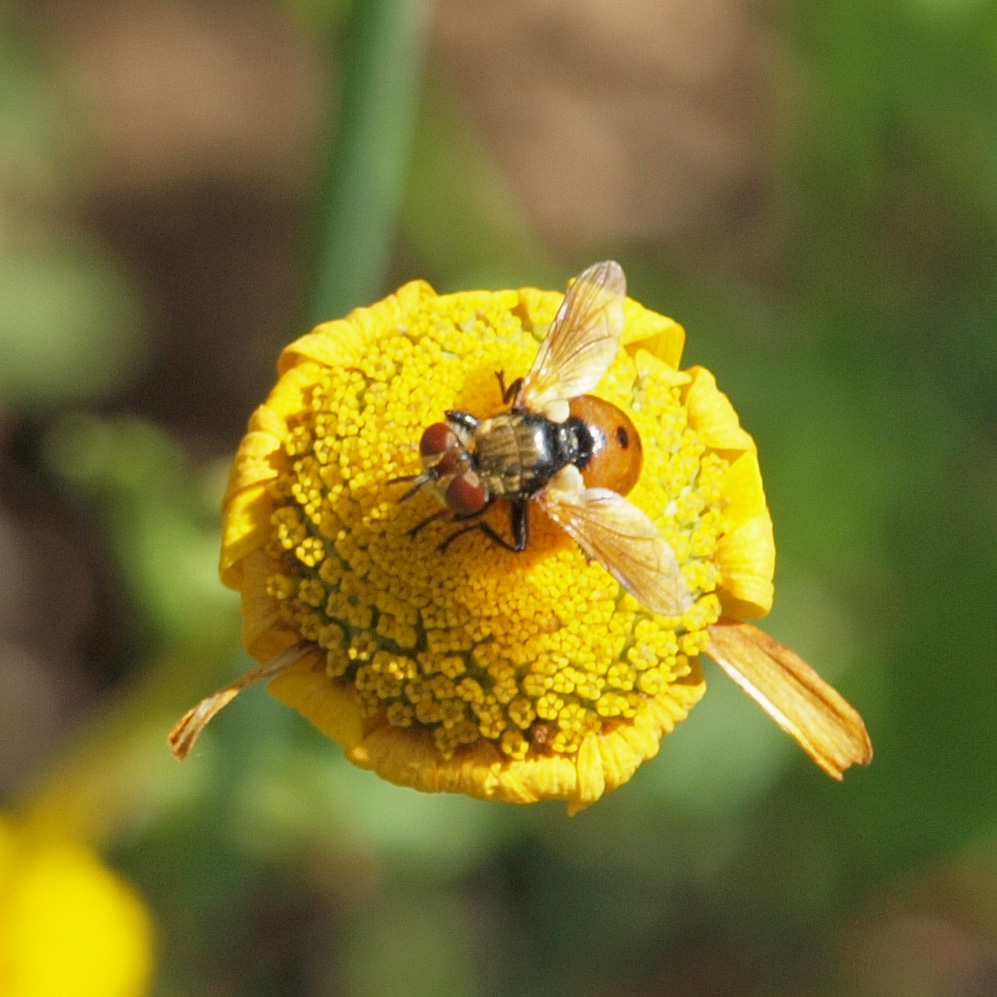

== Behaviour ==
The larvae grow as parasites of shield bugs in the Pentatomidae family. In Britain, the species is often recorded in warm dry sites, where it visits a range of open shallow flowers.

== Distribution ==
British Isles, Belarus, Czech Republic, Hungary, Latvia, Lithuania, Moldova, Poland, Romania, Slovakia, Ukraine, Denmark, Albania, Andorra, Bosnia and Herzegovina, Bulgaria, Corsica, Croatia, Greece, Italy, Macedonia, Malta, Portugal, Serbia, Slovenia, Spain, Turkey, Austria, Belgium, France, Germany, Netherlands, Switzerland, Japan, South Korea, Iran, Russia, Transcaucasia, China, Japan, Taiwan.
