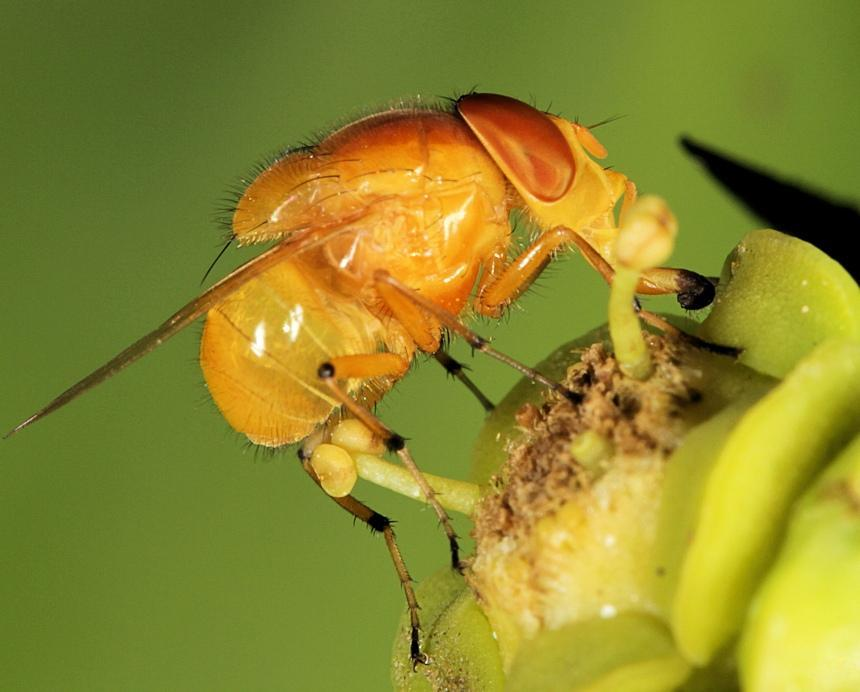
- Stegosoma vinculatum

Scientific classification
- Domain: Eukaryota
- Kingdom: Animalia
- Phylum: Arthropoda
- Class: Insecta
- Order: Diptera
- Family: Rhiniidae
- Genus: Stegosoma; Loew, 1863

= Stegosoma (fly) =

Genus of insects

Stegosoma is a genus of flies belonging to the family Rhiniidae.

The species of this genus are found in Africa.

Species:

- Stegosoma bowdeni Peris, 1951
- Stegosoma vinculatum Loew, 1863
