= Gymnosoma maxima =

Scientific classification
- Kingdom: Animalia
- Phylum: Arthropoda
- Class: Insecta
- Order: Diptera
- Family: Tachinidae
- Subfamily: Phasiinae
- Tribe: Gymnosomatini
- Genus: Gymnosoma
- Species: G. maxima

Binomial name
- Gymnosoma maxima Dupuis, 1966

Species of fly

Gymnosoma maxima is a species of tachinid flies in the genus Gymnosoma of the family Tachinidae.

== Distribution ==
Kazakhstan.
