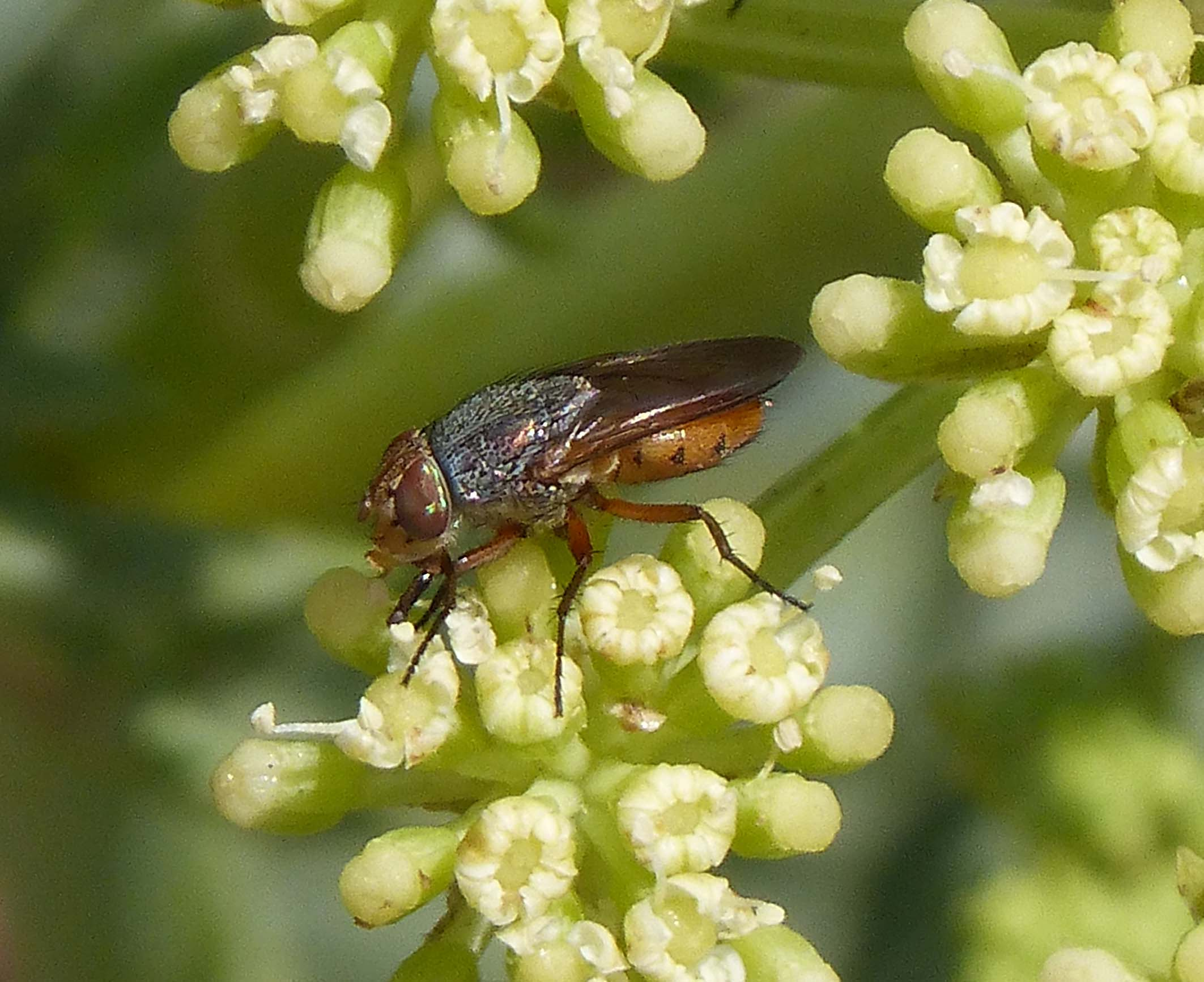
- Rhyncomya columbina, Spain

Scientific classification
- Missing taxonomy template (fix): Rhiniinae

= Rhiniinae =

Family of flies

Rhiniinae is a subfamily of flies in the order Diptera, and formerly included in the Calliphoridae, or later considered its own family Rhiniidae. There are around 30 genera and 370 described species in the group.

== Genera ==
These genera belong to the family Rhiniinae:

- Albaredaya Peris, 1956
- Alikangiella Villeneuve, 1927
- Arrhinidia Brauer & Bergenstamm, 1892
- Borbororhinia Townsend, 1917
- Cameranda Lehrer, 2007
- Chlororhinia Townsend, 1917
- Cosmina Robineau-Desvoidy, 1830
- Ethioporhina Lehrer, 2007
- Eurhyncomyia Malloch, 1926
- Fainia Zumpt, 1958
- Idiella Brauer & Bergenstamm, 1889
- Idiellopsis Townsend, 1917
- Isomyia Walker, 1926
- Malayomyza Malloch, 1928
- Metallea Wulp, 1880
- Metalliopsis Townsend, 1917
- Pararhynchomyia Becker, 1910
- Perisiella Zumpt, 1958
- Pseudorhyncomyia Peris, 1952
- Rhinia Robineau-Desvoidy, 1830
- Rhyncomya Robineau-Desvoidy, 1830
- Stegosoma Loew, 1863
- Stomorhina Rondani, 1861
- Strongyloneura Bigot, 1886
- Sumatria Malloch, 1926
- Thoracites Brauer & Bergenstamm, 1891
- Trichoberia Townsend, 1933
- Vanemdenia Peris, 1951
- Villeneuviella Austen, 1914
- Zumba Peris, 1951
