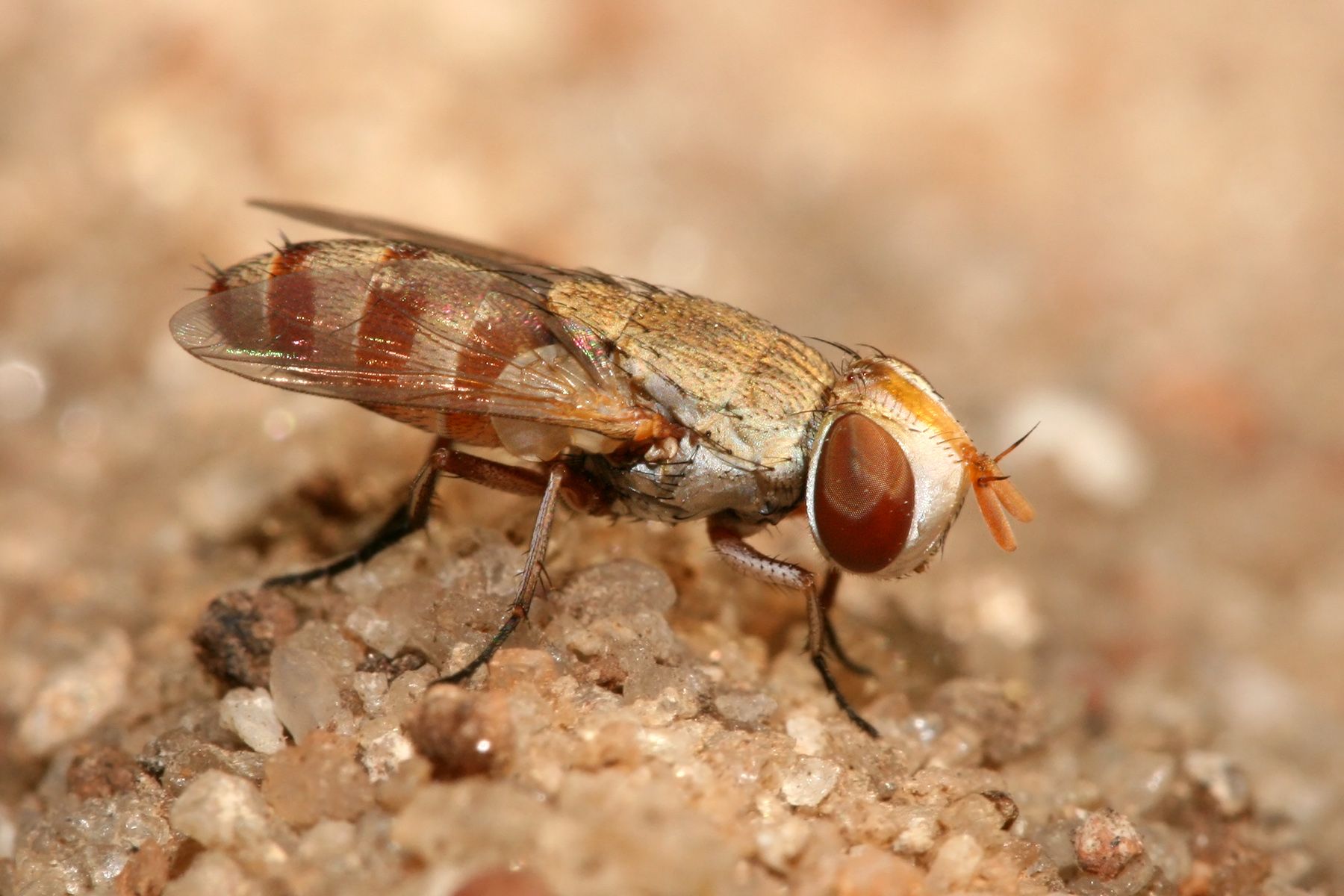
- Craticulina seriata

Scientific classification
- Domain: Eukaryota
- Kingdom: Animalia
- Phylum: Arthropoda
- Class: Insecta
- Order: Diptera
- Family: Sarcophagidae
- Subfamily: Miltogramminae

Synonyms
- Miltogrammatinae; Macronychiinae

= Miltogramminae =

Subfamily of flies

The Miltogramminae are a subfamily of the family Sarcophagidae. They are kleptoparasites of solitary bees and solitary wasps (not eusocial species).

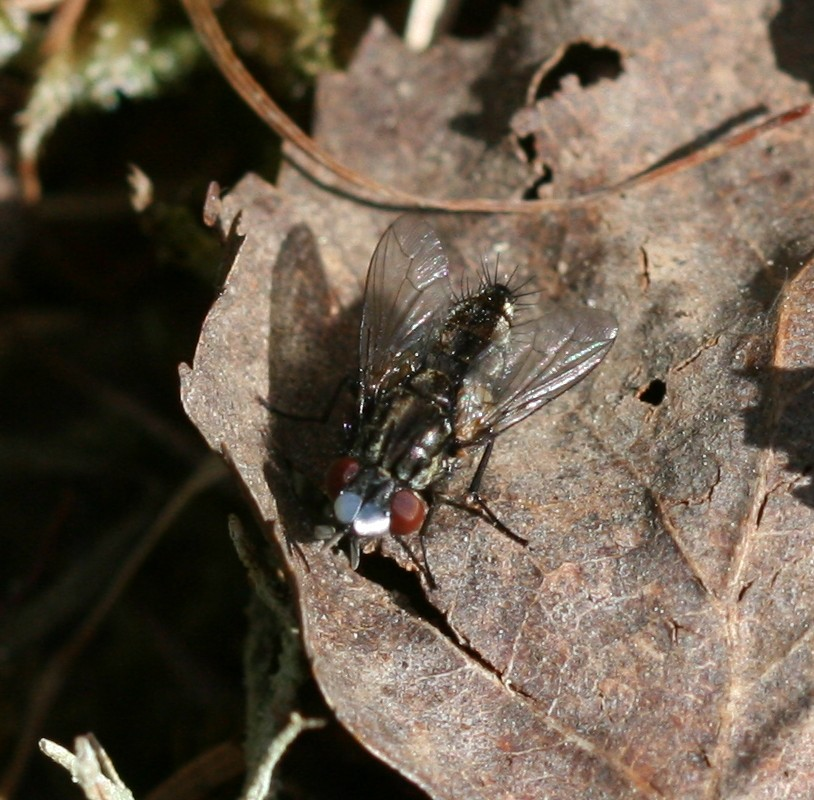
Metopia sp.

== Genera ==
- Aenigmetopia Malloch, 1930
- Alusomyia Villeneuve, 1933
- Ambouya Villeneuve, 1935
- Amobia Robineau-Desvoidy, 1830
- Apodacra Macquart, 1854
- Beludzhia Rohdendorf, 1935
- Chaetapodacra Rohdendorf, 1935
- Chivamyia Pape, 1996
- Chorezmomyia Rohdendorf, 1935
- Craticulina Bezzi, 1906
- Dolichotachina Villeneuve, 1913
- Eremasiomyia Rohdendorf, 1927
- Eumacronychia Townsend, 1892
- Euphyto Townsend, 1908
- Gymnoprosopa Townsend, 1892
- Gymnopsidia Shewell, 1987
- Hoplacephala Macquart, 1846
- Khowaba Pape, 1991
- Lamprometopia Macquart, 1846
- Macronychia Rondani, 1859
- Medomyia Rohdendorf, 1926
- Mesomelena Rondani, 1859
- Metopia Meigen, 1803
- Metopodia Brauer & von Bergenstamm, 1889
- Miltogramma Meigen, 1803
- Oebalia Robineau-Desvoidy, 1863
- Opsidia Coquillett, 1895
- Phrosinella Robineau-Desvoidy, 1863
- Phylloteles Loew, 1844
- Protomiltogramma Townsend, 1912
- Pterella Robineau-Desvoidy, 1863
- Senotainia Macquart, 1846
- Sphecapatoclea Villeneuve, 1909
- Sphecapatodes Villeneuve, 1912
- Sphenometopa Townsend, 1908
- Taxigramma Perris, 1852
- Xiphidiella Zumpt, 1852
