= Fritz Konrad Ernst Zumpt =

German entomologist

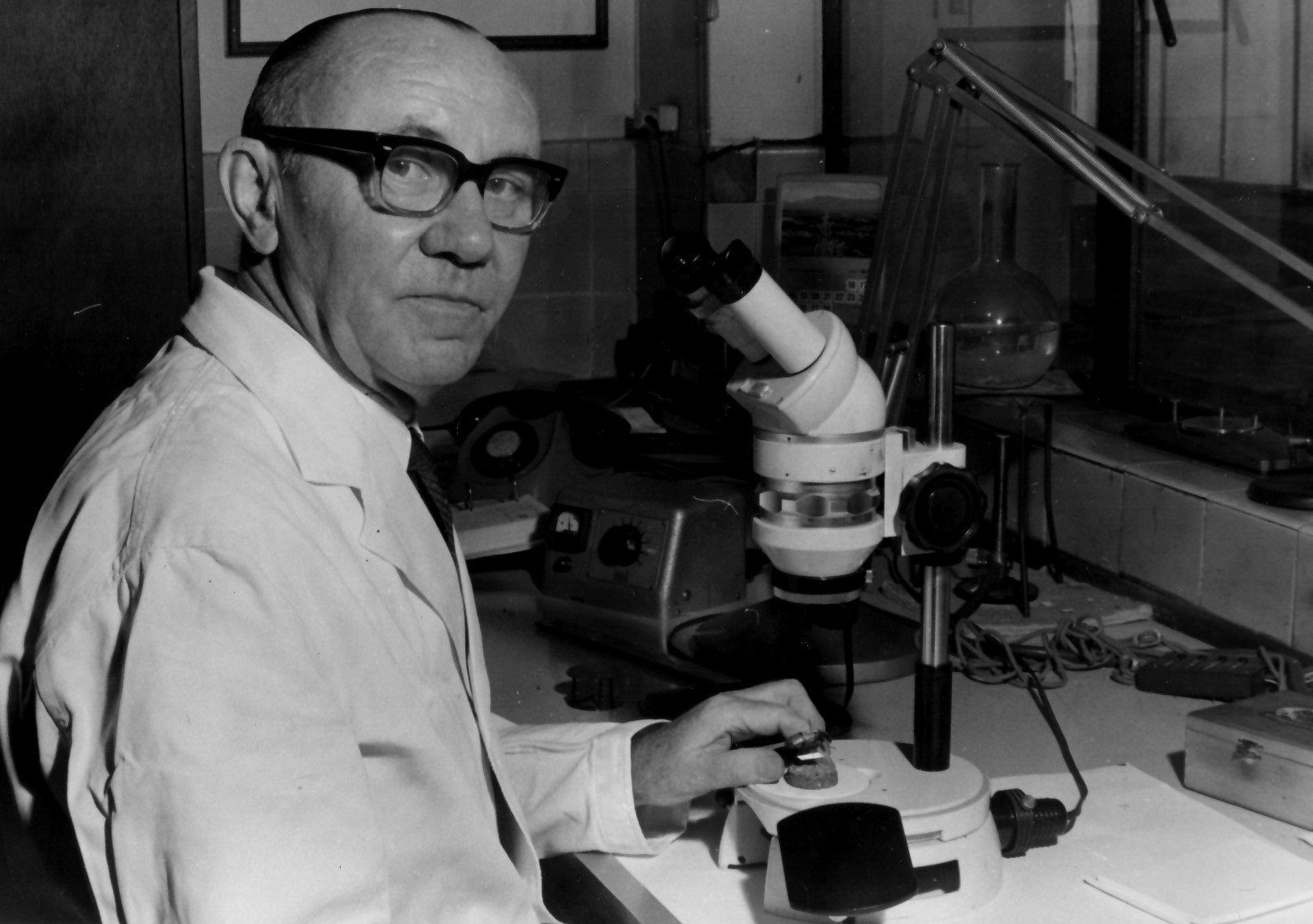
Dr Fritz Konrad Ernst Zumpt 65 years 11 May 1973

Fritz Konrad Ernst Zumpt (11 May 1908 – 25 October 1985) was a German entomologist who worked mainly in Ethiopia, but also to a lesser extent in Uganda, Ghana and Mozambique. He is best known for his work on Diptera and the associations between insects and African mammals, as well as for his work on myiasis.

Amongst Zumpt’s works are:

- Descriptions of three new Sarcophaga species from the Ethiopian region (Diptera: Calliphoridae). Proc. R. Ent. Soc. Lond. 19: 80-84(1950)
- Remarks on the classification of the Ethiopian Sarcophaginae with descriptions of new genera and species. Proc. R. Ent. Soc. Lond. 21: 1-18 (1952).
- New Sarcophaga species from the Ethiopian Region (Diptera: Calliphoridae). J. Entomol. Soc. S. Afr. 14: 171-99. (1951).
- Calliphorinae. Fliegen Palaearkt. Reg. 64i, 140 p. (1956)
- Calliphoridae (Diptera Cyclorrhapha)Calliphorini and Chrysomyiini. Exploration du Parc National Albert, Mission G.F. de Witte (1933-1935)(1956).
- Insekten als Krankheitserreger und Krankheitsüberträger. Kosmos Verlag. Stuttgart. (1956).
- What is Sarcophaga binodosa Curran? Proc. R. Ent. Soc. Lond. 31: 151-154(1962).
- Myiasis in man and animals in the Old World London: Butterworth (1965).
- Two new species of Sacrophagidae (diptera) from the Madagascan region. Bull. Ann. Soc. R. Ent. Belg. 105: 74-78(1969).
- Phumosia colei n.sp. (Diptera: Sarcophagidae) from Ghana. Novos taxa entomologicos (Suppl. Revista de Entomologia de Mocambique) No. 75 (1970).
- Phumosia spangleri, a new species from Uganda and re-description of Phumosia lesnei (Seguy) from Mozambique (Diptera: Sarcophagidae: Calliphoridae). Novos taxa entomologicos (Suppl. Revista de Entomologia de Mocambique) No. 81 (1970).
- With Baurisbhene, E. Notes on the genus Phumosia Robineau-Desvoidy in the Ethiopian geographical region, with description of a new species. (Diptera: Sarcophagidae: Calliphoridae). Bull. Ann. Soc. R. Ent. Belg. 108: 262-271 (1970).
