= Boris Rohdendorf =

Soviet entomologist (1904–1977)

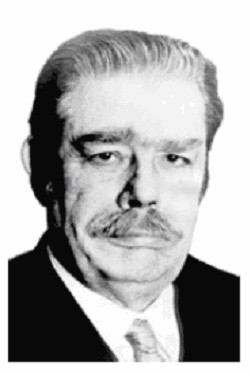
Boris von Rohdendorf

Boris Borisovich Rohdendorf (Russian: Борис Борисович Родендорф, 12 July 1904, Saint Petersburg – 21 November 1977, Moscow) was a Soviet entomologist and curator at the Zoological Museum at the Moscow University. He attained the position of head of the Laboratory of Arthropods, Paleontological Institute, Russian Academy of Sciences, Academy of Sciences of the Soviet Union in Moscow. A student of Andrey Martynov, he was a prolific taxonomist who described numerous new taxa, including fossil Diptera, and published important syntheses on fossil insects. His work was a basis for many Russian paleoentomologists.

Rohdendorf was born near St. Petersburg where his father was an army man. He studied at the natural science department of the Moscow University and from 1921 he worked as a taxonomist at the zoological museum of the university. He took a special interest in the Diptera, examining the Tachinidae, Phasiidae, Calliphoridae and Sarcophagidae. In 1923 he described a new Phasiinae from Turkmenistan. He graduated from University in 1925 and began to work on the Palearctic Sarcophagidae. He went on collecting expeditions into central Asia and the Caucasus. He worked for some time on cotton pests at the experimental station in Tashkent. He then examined the dipteran parasites of the locust Schistocerca gregaria and published his results in 1932. In 1935 he returned to work at the Institute of Zoology at Moscow. In 1936 he examined the fossil material from Kazakhstan. 1937 he published a monograph on the Palearctic Sacophagidae as part of the Fauna of the USSR series. After the death of Martynov in 1938 he became the head of the laboratory and led entomological studies. Nearly 30 genera and species have been named in his honour.

== Partial bibliography ==
- Rohdendorf, B.B. 1937. [Dipteran insects, Vol. 19, No. 1: Fam. Sarcophagidae (Part 1), Fauna of the USSR, New Series,] No. 12 Moscow & Leningrad, 501pp. (In Russian and German)
- Rohdendorf, B.B. 1962. Order Diptera. In B.B. Rohdendorf (editor), Fundamentals of Paleontology, vol. 9, Arthropoda-Tracheata and Chelicerata: 444–502. [1991 English translation of Russian original, Smithsonian Institution Libraries and National Science Foundation]
- Rohdendorf, B.B. 1964. [Historical development of dipterous insects]. Trudy Paleontol. Inst. 100, 311 pp.
  - Rohdendorf, B.B. 1974. The historical development of Diptera. University of Alberta Press, Edmonton. 360 pp. (English translation)
- Rohdendorf, B.B. 1967. [Directions in the historical development of sarcophagids (Diptera, Sarcophagidae)] Moscow, 92pp. (In Russian)
- Rohdendorf, B.B. and Rasnitsyn, A.P. (Editors) 1980. [A historical development of the class of insects] Moscow, 269pp. (In Russian).
