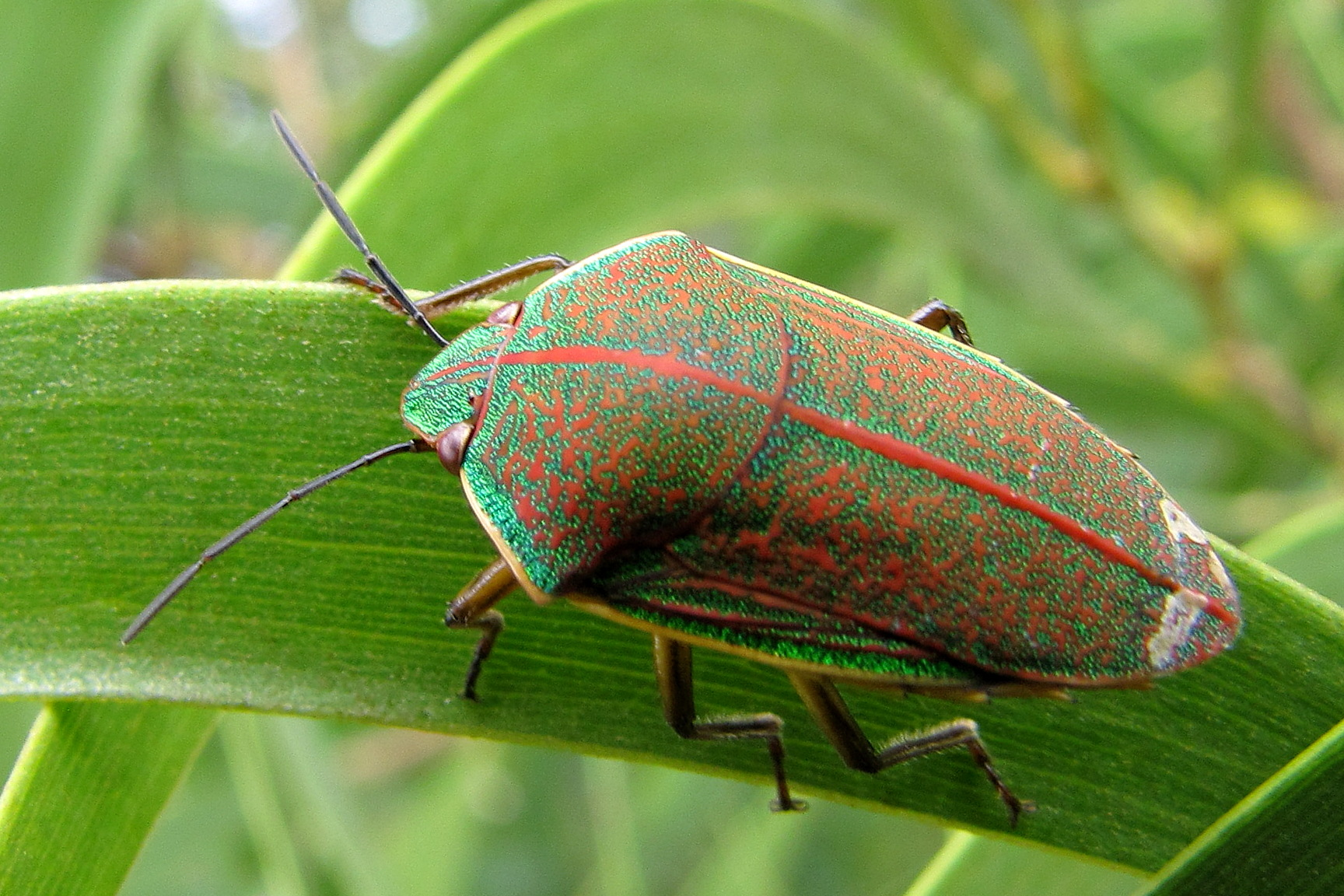

Scientific classification
- Kingdom: Animalia
- Phylum: Arthropoda
- Clade: Pancrustacea
- Class: Insecta
- Order: Hemiptera
- Suborder: Heteroptera
- Family: Scutelleridae
- Genus: Coleotichus
- Species: C. blackburniae

Binomial name
- Coleotichus blackburniae White, 1881

= Coleotichus blackburniae =

Species of true bug

Coleotichus blackburniae is a species of insect in the family Scutelleridae, the jewel bugs. It is commonly known as the Koa bug or the Koa shield bug. It has been dubbed the stinkless stink bug for its lack of the malodorous defensive chemicals present in other heteropterans. It is Hawaii's largest endemic true bug.

== Description ==
The exoskeletons of Koa bugs contain many different iridescent colours.

The eggs hatch approximately 9 days after being laid. They are only a few millimetres wide, and are laid in a tight cluster. They are green in colour at first, and then turn red as they develop.

== Distribution and habitat ==
This insect occurs on all the main islands of Hawaii. They are found on `a`ali`i (Dodonaea viscosa) bushes and koa (Acacia koa) trees.

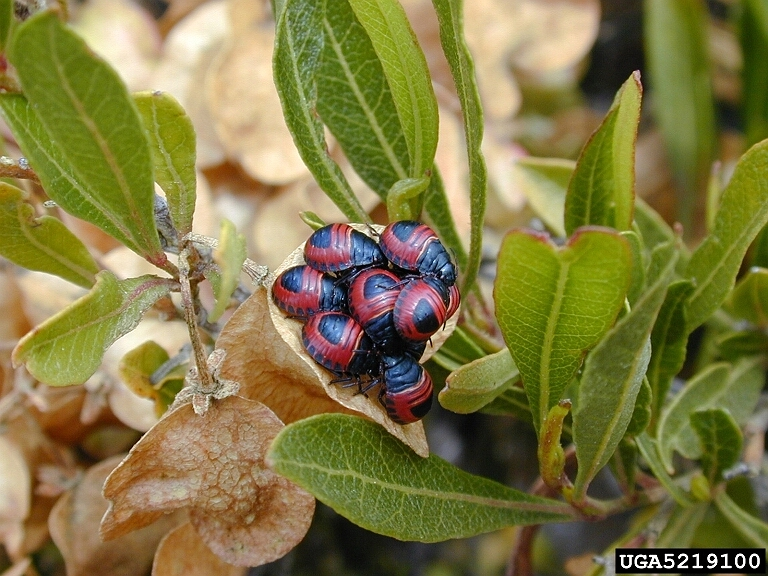
A cluster of nymphs

Also found on Formosan Koa (Acacia confusa) which is native to Southeast Asia. It has been commonly used in Hawaii as an ornamental landscape tree that has been deemed invasive. A. confusa and A. koa both have distinctive phyllodes that differentiate each species but since its introduction C. blackburniae has been recorded to associate with the invasive Formosan koa.

== Behaviour and diet ==
Common to all true bugs, this species has no mouth parts with which to bite, cut, or chew its food. Instead it has a tube-like structure that it uses to suck the contents from the seeds of several types of koa and `a`ali`i plants.

Numbers of this insect were greatly reduced on most of the Hawaiian islands. Two parasitoid insects on hemipterans, Trichopoda pennipes and Trissolcus basalis were introduced with the intention of controlling Nezara viridula, but also attacked the koa bug. While Trissolcus basalis attacked the Koa Bug's eggs, Trichopoda pennipes attacked Koa Bug adults. Today, the Koa Bug is common in only a few areas of the Big Island.
