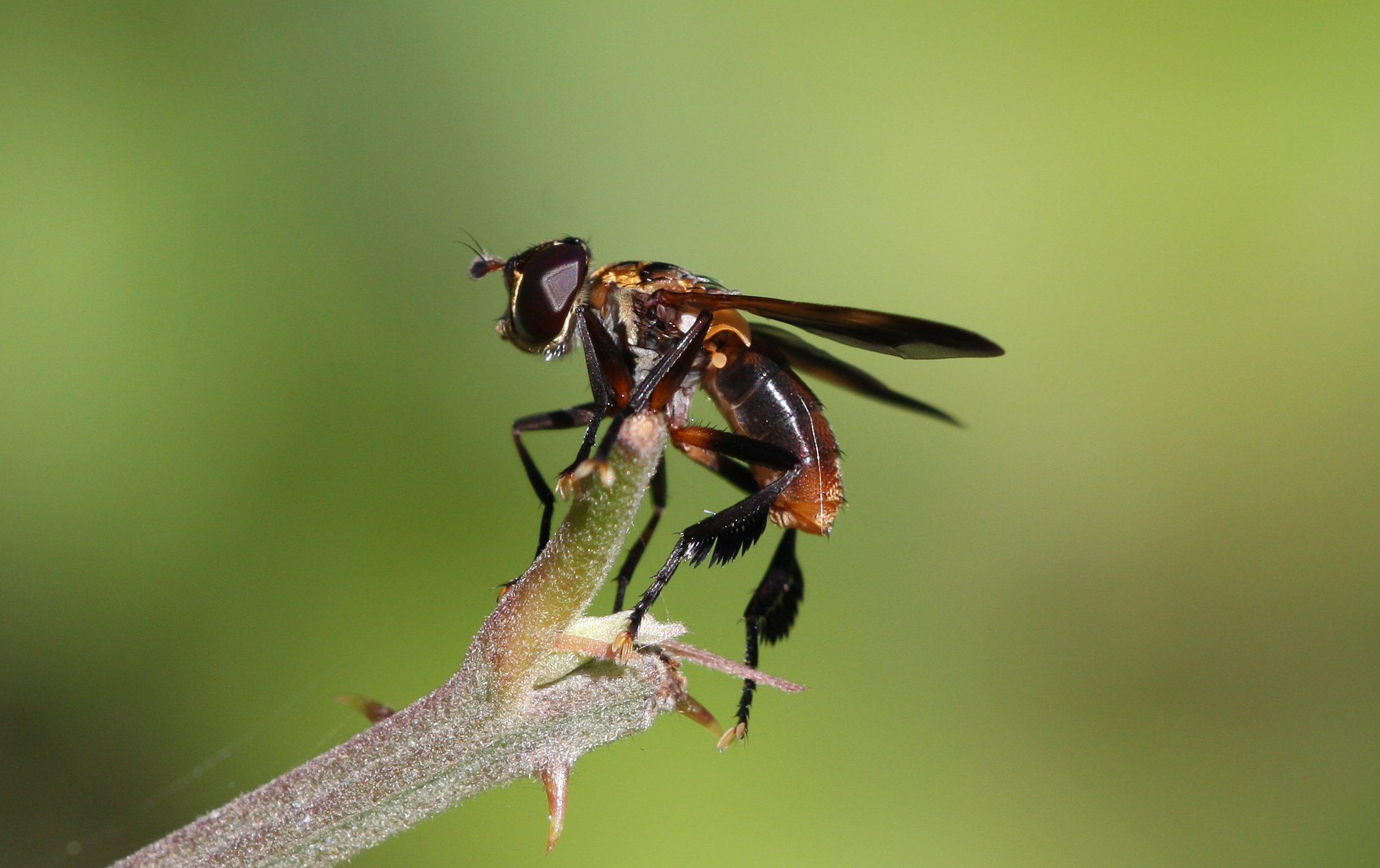
- Trichopoda pennipes

Scientific classification
- Kingdom: Animalia
- Phylum: Arthropoda
- Class: Insecta
- Order: Diptera
- Family: Tachinidae
- Subfamily: Phasiinae
- Tribe: Gymnosomatini
- Genus: Trichopoda; Berthold, 1827

Type species
- Thereva plumipes Fabricius, 1805

Subgenera
- Galactomyia Townsend, 1908; Trichopoda Berthold, 1827

= Trichopoda =

Genus of tachinid flies

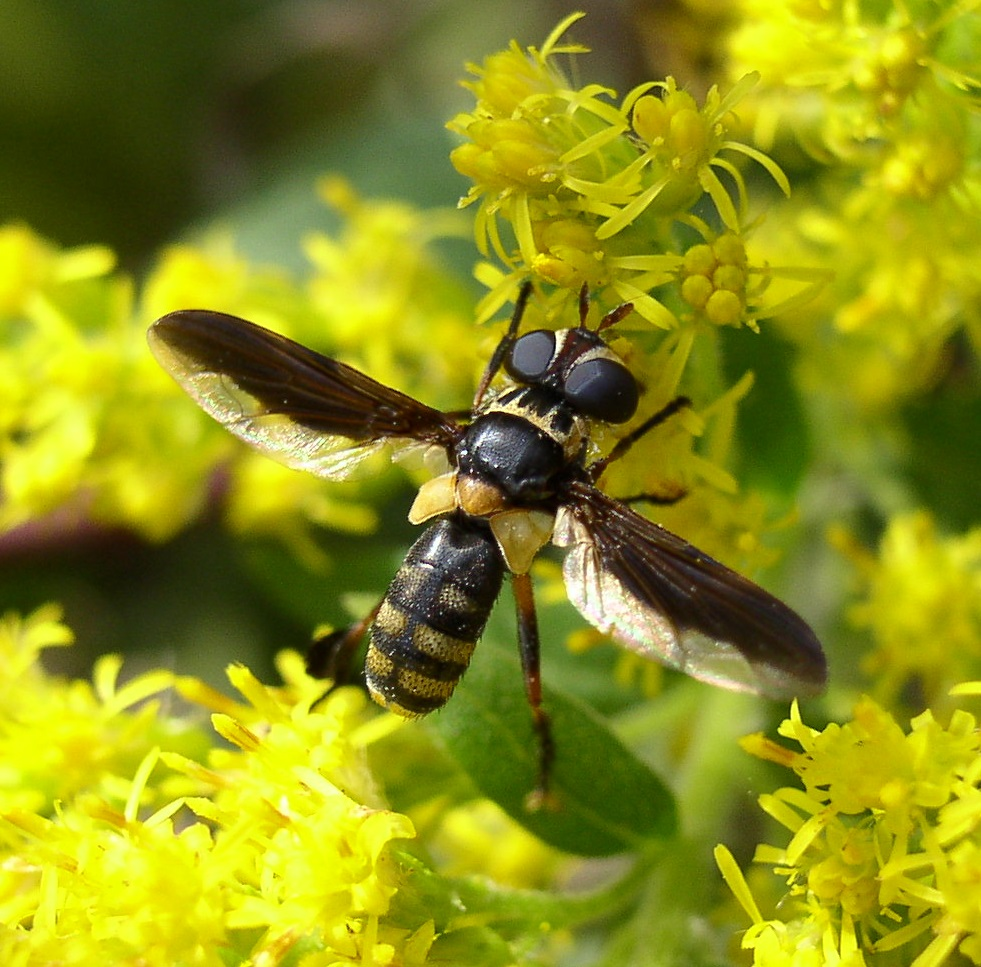
Trichopoda plumipes on goldenrod

squash bug with Tachinid fly eggs attached and a feather-legged tachinid fly, probably Trichopoda pennipes, quickly depositing another egg on it.

Trichopoda is a genus of tachinid flies, commonly known as the feather-legged flies or hairy-legged flies. They are small, brightly coloured flies that congregate on flowers, feeding on nectar. The halteres are covered with yellow scales and there is a fringe of flattened hairs on the hind legs. The larvae are parasitoids of true bugs in the order Hemiptera, including stink bugs in the family Pentatomidae and leaf-footed bugs and squash bugs in the family Coreidae. They are found in North and South America.

== Species ==
- Subgenus Galactomyia Townsend, 1908

- Trichopoda auricauda Dios & Nihei, 2020
- Trichopoda castannea Dios & Nihei, 2020
- Trichopoda curvicercus Dios & Nihei, 2020
- Trichopoda dupuisi Dios & Nihei, 2020
- Trichopoda elongata Dios & Nihei, 2020
- Trichopoda eupilipes Dios & Nihei, 2020
- Trichopoda flava Röder, 1885
- Trichopoda goliana Dios & Nihei, 2020
- Trichopoda lanipes (Fabricius, 1805)
- Trichopoda nigricauda Bigot, 1876
- Trichopoda pennipes Fabricius, 1781
- Trichopoda pictipennis Bigot, 1876
- Trichopoda pilipes (Fabricius, 1805)
- Trichopoda splendida Dios & Nihei, 2020
- Trichopoda subalipes Townsend, 1897
- Trichopoda tenebrosa Dios & Nihei, 2020
- Trichopoda tschorsnigi Dios & Nihei, 2020
- Trichopoda umbra Walker, 1849
- Trichopoda urucurytuba Dios & Nihei, 2020

- Subgenus Trichopoda Berthold, 1827

- Trichopoda alipes Wulp, 1892
- Trichopoda indivisa Townsend, 1897
- Trichopoda plumipes (Fabricius, 1805)
- Trichopoda squamipes Wulp, 1892
- Trichopoda subdivisa (Townsend, 1908)
- Trichopoda sabroskyi Dios & Nihei, 2020
