= Micrurus diutius =

Scientific classification
- Kingdom: Animalia
- Phylum: Chordata
- Class: Reptilia
- Order: Squamata
- Suborder: Serpentes
- Family: Elapidae
- Genus: Micrurus
- Species: M. diutius

Binomial name
- Micrurus diutius Burger, 1955

Synonyms
- Micrurus lemniscatus diutius Burger, 1955

Species of snake

Micrurus diutius, also known commonly as the Trinidad ribbon coral snake, is a species of venomous snake in the family Elapidae. The species is native to Trinidad and northern South America.

== Local common names ==
Common names for Micrurus diutius include coral acintada trinitaria in South American Spanish and cobra coral de faixas de Trinidad in Brazilian Portuguese.

== Description ==
Large for its genus, Micrurus diutius may attain a total length (tail included) of 1 m (3.3 ft) or more. The color pattern consists of rings of red, white, and black, with the black rings in triads.

== Geographic distribution ==
Micrurus diutius is found in Brazil, Guyana, Trinidad, and Venezuela. The type locality is "Tunapuna, Trinidad".

== Habitat ==
The preferred natural habitat of Micrurus diutius is humid forest, but it has also been found in savanna and agricultural areas.

== Diet ==
Micrurus diutius preys upon a variety of poikilotherms, including fishes such as Synbranchus marmoratus; amphisbaenians such as Leposternon polystegum; lizards of the genus Bachia; snakes such as Atractus trilineatus, snakes of the genus Liophis, other coral snakes such as Micrurus circinalis, and even its own species.

== Reproduction ==
Micrurus diutius is oviparous.

== Etymology ==
The specific name, diutius, is Latin for "too long".
