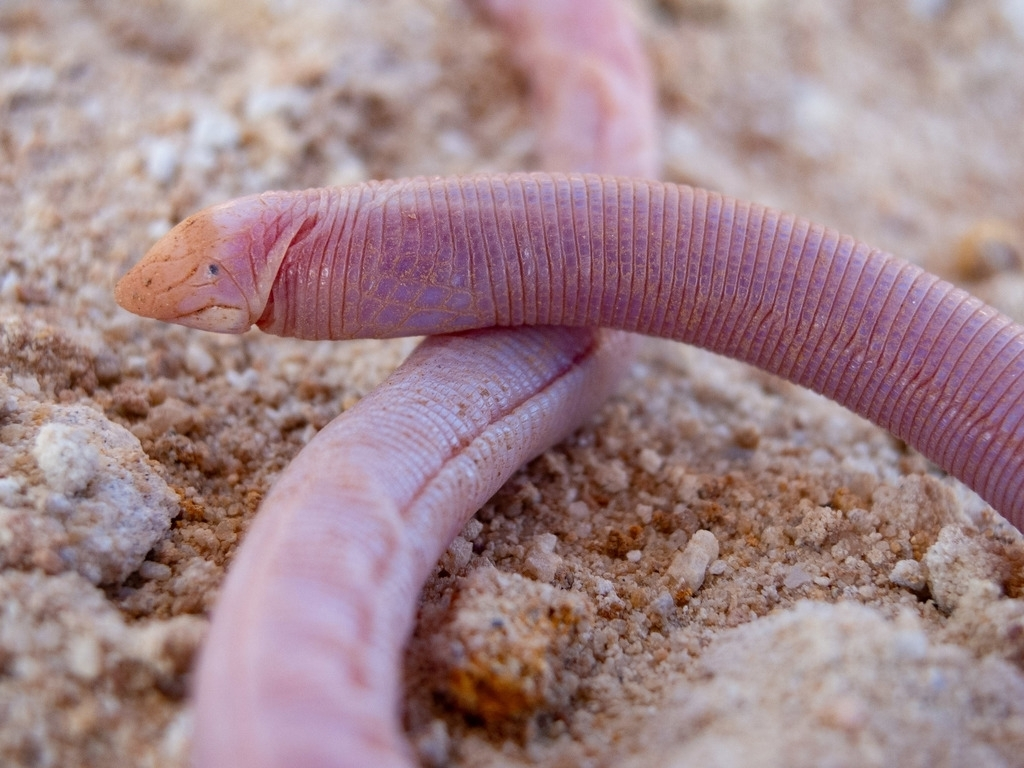
- Leposternon octostegum
- Leposternon microcephalum

Scientific classification
- Kingdom: Animalia
- Phylum: Chordata
- Class: Reptilia
- Order: Squamata
- Clade: Amphisbaenia
- Family: Amphisbaenidae
- Genus: Leposternon; Wagler, 1824

Species
- 11, see text.

= Leposternon =

Genus of amphisbaenianss

Leposternon is a genus of amphisbaenians in the family Amphisbaenidae. Species in the genus are commonly known as worm lizards. 11 species are placed in this genus.

== Species ==
The following species are recognized as being valid.

- Leposternon bagual Ribeiro, Santos Jr. & Zaher, 2015
- Leposternon cerradensis Ribeiro, Vaz-Silva & Santos Jr., 2008
- Leposternon infraorbitale (Berthold, 1859) – Berthold's worm lizard
- Leposternon kisteumacheri Porto, Soares & Caramaschi, 2000
- Leposternon maximus Ribeiro, Nogueira, Cintra, da Silva & Zaher, 2011
- Leposternon microcephalum Wagler, 1824 – smallhead worm lizard
- Leposternon mineiro Ribeiro, Silveira & Santos Jr., 2018
- Leposternon octostegum (A.H.A. Duméril, 1851) – Duméril's worm lizard
- Leposternon polystegum (A.H.A. Duméril, 1851) – Bahia worm lizard
- Leposternon scutigerum (Hemprich), 1820 – shielded worm lizard
- Leposternon wuchereri (W. Peters, 1879) – Wucherer's worm lizard

Nota bene: A binomial authority in parentheses indicates that the species was originally described in a genus other than Leposternon.
