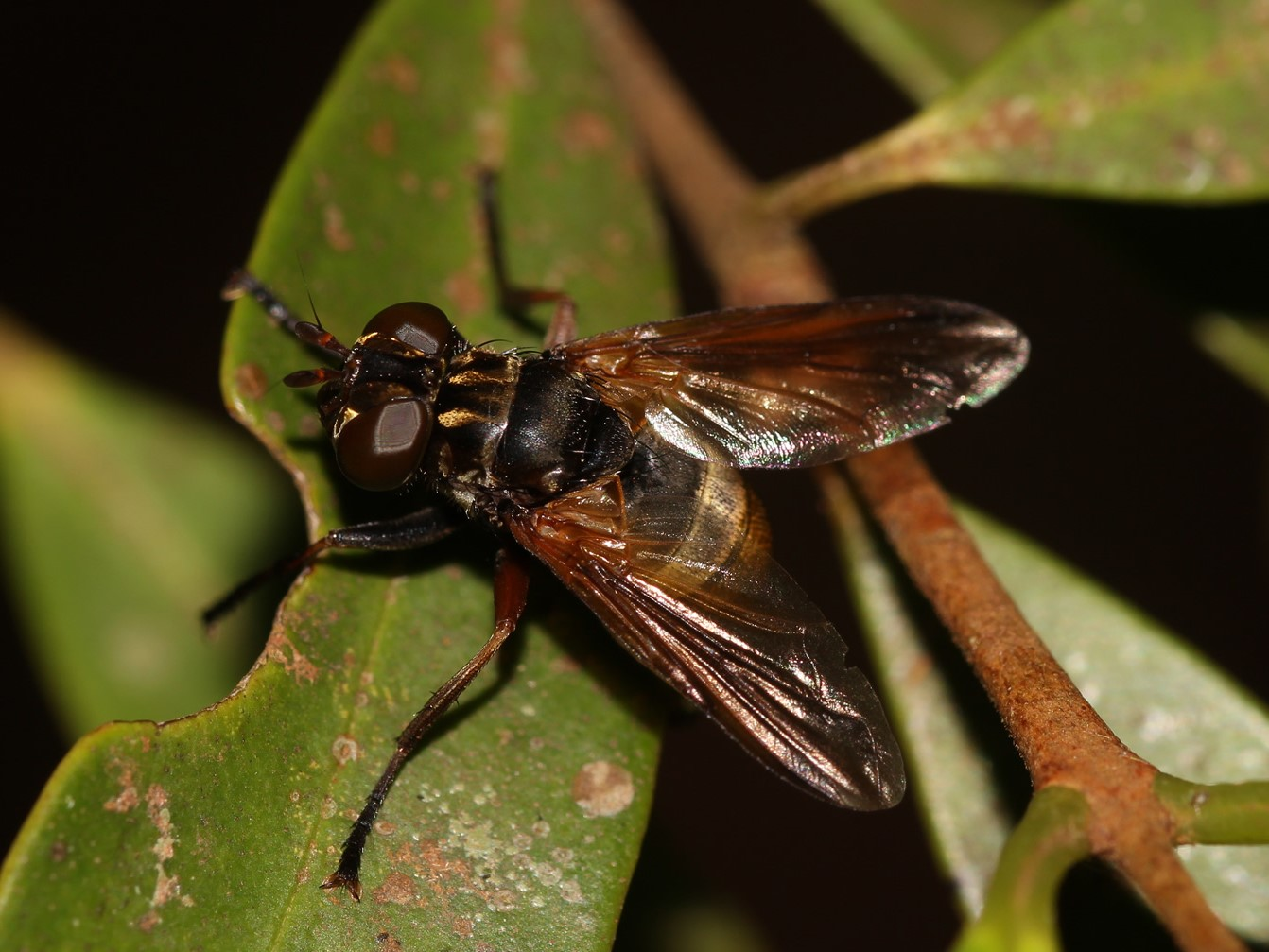
- Trichopoda sabroskyi

Scientific classification
- Kingdom: Animalia
- Phylum: Arthropoda
- Class: Insecta
- Order: Diptera
- Family: Tachinidae
- Subfamily: Phasiinae
- Tribe: Gymnosomatini
- Genus: Trichopoda
- Subgenus: Trichopoda; Berthold, 1827

Type species
- Thereva plumipes Fabricius, 1805

= Trichopoda (subgenus) =

Subgenus of flies

Trichopoda is a subgenus of tachinid flies, commonly known as the feather-legged flies or hairy-legged flies. They are found in North and South America.

== Species ==
- Trichopoda alipes Wulp, 1892
- Trichopoda indivisa Townsend, 1897
- Trichopoda plumipes (Fabricius, 1805)
- Trichopoda squamipes Wulp, 1892
- Trichopoda subdivisa (Townsend, 1908)
- Trichopoda sabroskyi Dios & Nihei, 2020
