= Berthold's worm lizard =

Conservation status
- Least Concern (IUCN 3.1)

Scientific classification
- Kingdom: Animalia
- Phylum: Chordata
- Class: Reptilia
- Order: Squamata
- Clade: Amphisbaenia
- Family: Amphisbaenidae
- Genus: Leposternon
- Species: L. infraorbitale

Binomial name
- Leposternon infraorbitale (Berthold, 1859)

Species of lizard

Berthold's worm lizard (Leposternon infraorbitale) is a worm lizard species in the family Amphisbaenidae. It is endemic to Brazil.
