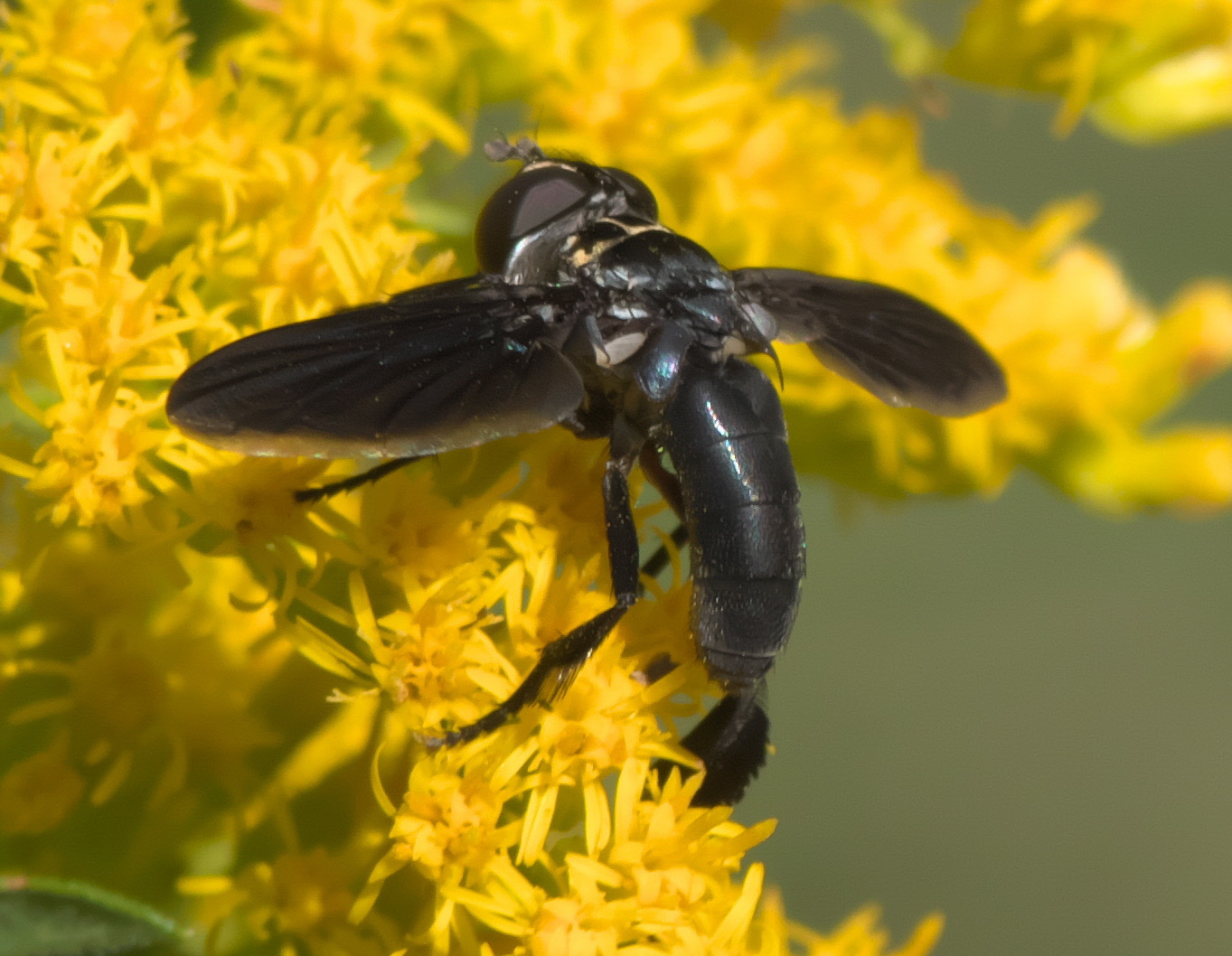
- Trichopoda lanipes

Scientific classification
- Kingdom: Animalia
- Phylum: Arthropoda
- Class: Insecta
- Order: Diptera
- Family: Tachinidae
- Subfamily: Phasiinae
- Tribe: Gymnosomatini
- Genus: Trichopoda
- Subgenus: Galactomyia
- Species: T. lanipes

Binomial name
- Trichopoda lanipes (Fabricius, 1805)

Synonyms
- Thereva lanipes Loew, 1863; Trichopoda formosa Fabricius, 1805; Trichopoda radiata Wiedemann, 1830; Galactomyia tropicalis Townsend, 1908

= Trichopoda lanipes =

Species of fly

Trichopoda lanipes is a species of bristle fly in the family Tachinidae.

== Distribution ==
Canada, United States, Mexico.

== Hosts ==
Acanthocephala femorata, Archimerus alternatus, Nezara viridula, Podisus maculiventris.

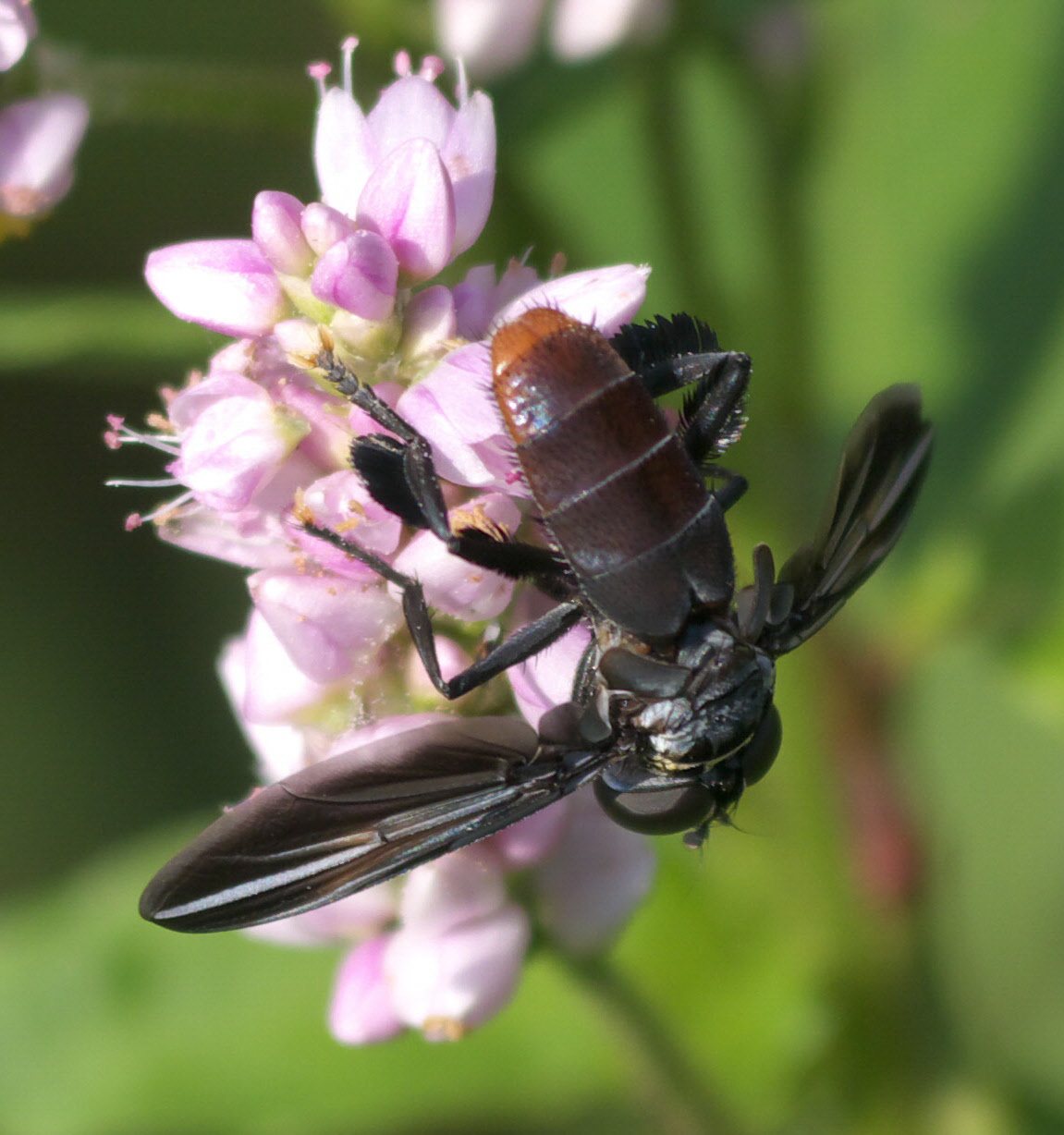
Trichopoda lanipes, Pryor, OK, USA
