= Leposternon maximus =

Conservation status
- Least Concern (IUCN 3.1)

Scientific classification
- Kingdom: Animalia
- Phylum: Chordata
- Class: Reptilia
- Order: Squamata
- Clade: Amphisbaenia
- Family: Amphisbaenidae
- Genus: Leposternon
- Species: L. maximus

Binomial name
- Leposternon maximus (Ribeiro, Nogueira, Cintra, Da Silva, & Zaher, 2011)

Species of lizard

Leposternon maximus is a worm lizard species in the family Amphisbaenidae. It is endemic to Brazil.
