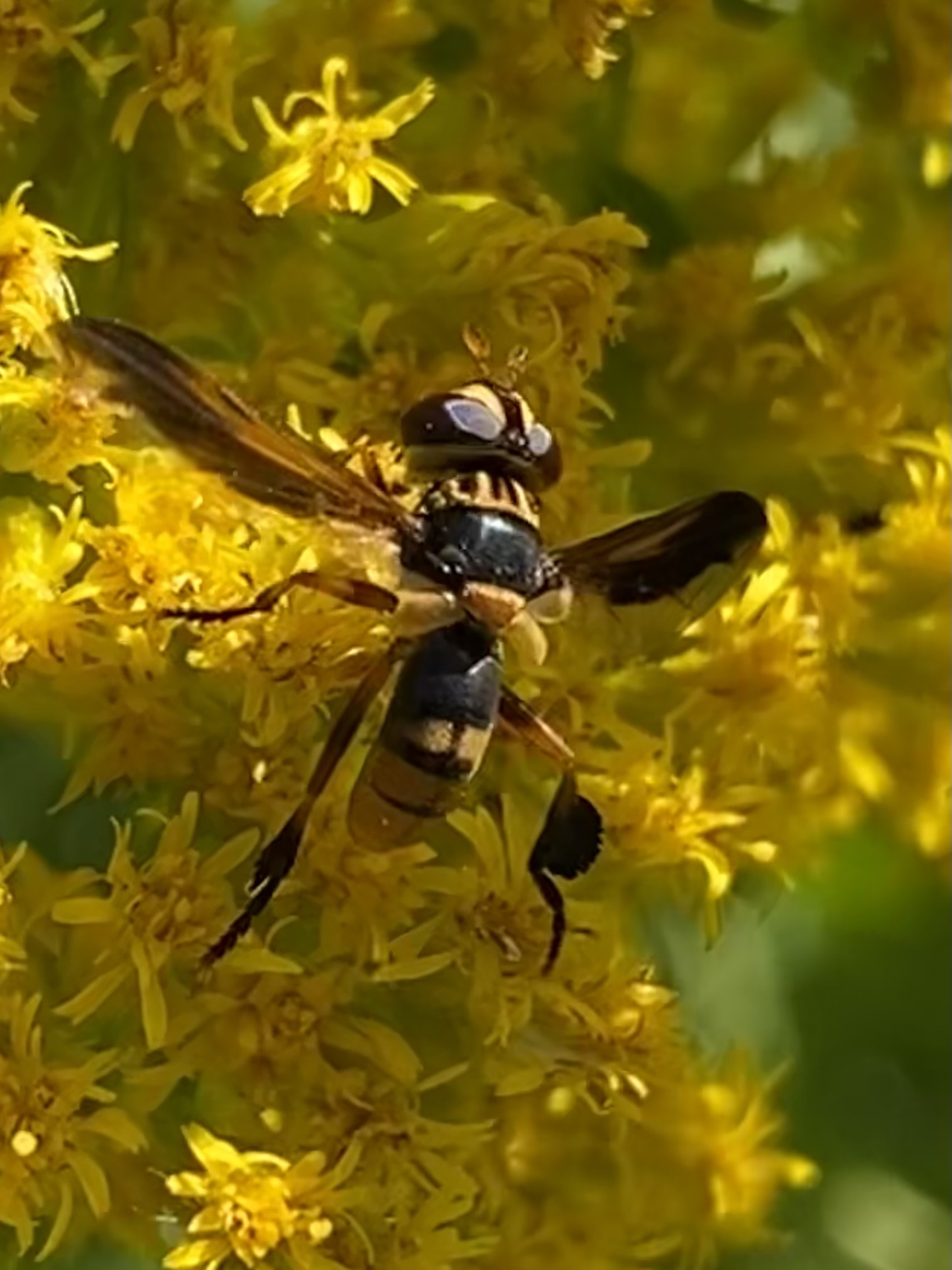

Scientific classification
- Kingdom: Animalia
- Phylum: Arthropoda
- Class: Insecta
- Order: Diptera
- Family: Tachinidae
- Subfamily: Phasiinae
- Tribe: Gymnosomatini
- Genus: Trichopoda
- Subgenus: Trichopoda
- Species: T. indivisa

Binomial name
- Trichopoda indivisa Townsend, 1897

Synonyms
- Trichopoda histrio indivisa Townsend, 1897

= Trichopoda indivisa =

Species of fly

Trichopoda indivisa is a species of feather-legged flies in the family Tachinidae.

== Distribution ==
The species can be found in the United States and Mexico.
