= Leposternon cerradensis =

Scientific classification
- Kingdom: Animalia
- Phylum: Chordata
- Class: Reptilia
- Order: Squamata
- Clade: Amphisbaenia
- Family: Amphisbaenidae
- Genus: Leposternon
- Species: L. cerradensis

Binomial name
- Leposternon cerradensis Ribeiro, Vazsilva, & Santos Jr., 2008

Species of lizard

Leposternon cerradensis is a worm lizard species in the family Amphisbaenidae. It is found in Brazil.
