= Leposternon kisteumacheri =

Conservation status
- Vulnerable (IUCN 3.1)

Scientific classification
- Kingdom: Animalia
- Phylum: Chordata
- Class: Reptilia
- Order: Squamata
- Clade: Amphisbaenia
- Family: Amphisbaenidae
- Genus: Leposternon
- Species: L. kisteumacheri

Binomial name
- Leposternon kisteumacheri Porto, Soares & Caramaschi, 2000

Synonyms
- Amphisbaena kisteumacheri (Porto, Soares & Caramaschi, 2000)

Species of amphisbaenian

Leposternon kisteumacheri is a species of amphisbaenian in the family Amphisbaenidae. The species is endemic to Brazil.

== Common names ==
Common names for L. kisteumacheri, in Brazilian Portuguese, include cobra-de-duas-cabeças (meaning "two-headed snake") and cobra-cega (meaning "blind snake").

== Etymology ==
The specific name, kisteumacheri, is in honor of Brazilian herpetologist Geraldo Kisteumacher.

== Description ==
Dorsally, L. kisteumacheri is bright yellow. Ventrally, it is grayish white. It has five series of large head shields. It lacks supraoculars, preoculars, and infraoculars. It has two precloacal pores.

== Geographic range ==
L. kisteumacheri is found in the Brazilian states of Bahia and Minas Gerais.

== Habitat ==
The preferred natural habitat of L. kisteumacheri is forest with sandy soil.

== Reproduction ==
L. kisteumacheri is oviparous.
