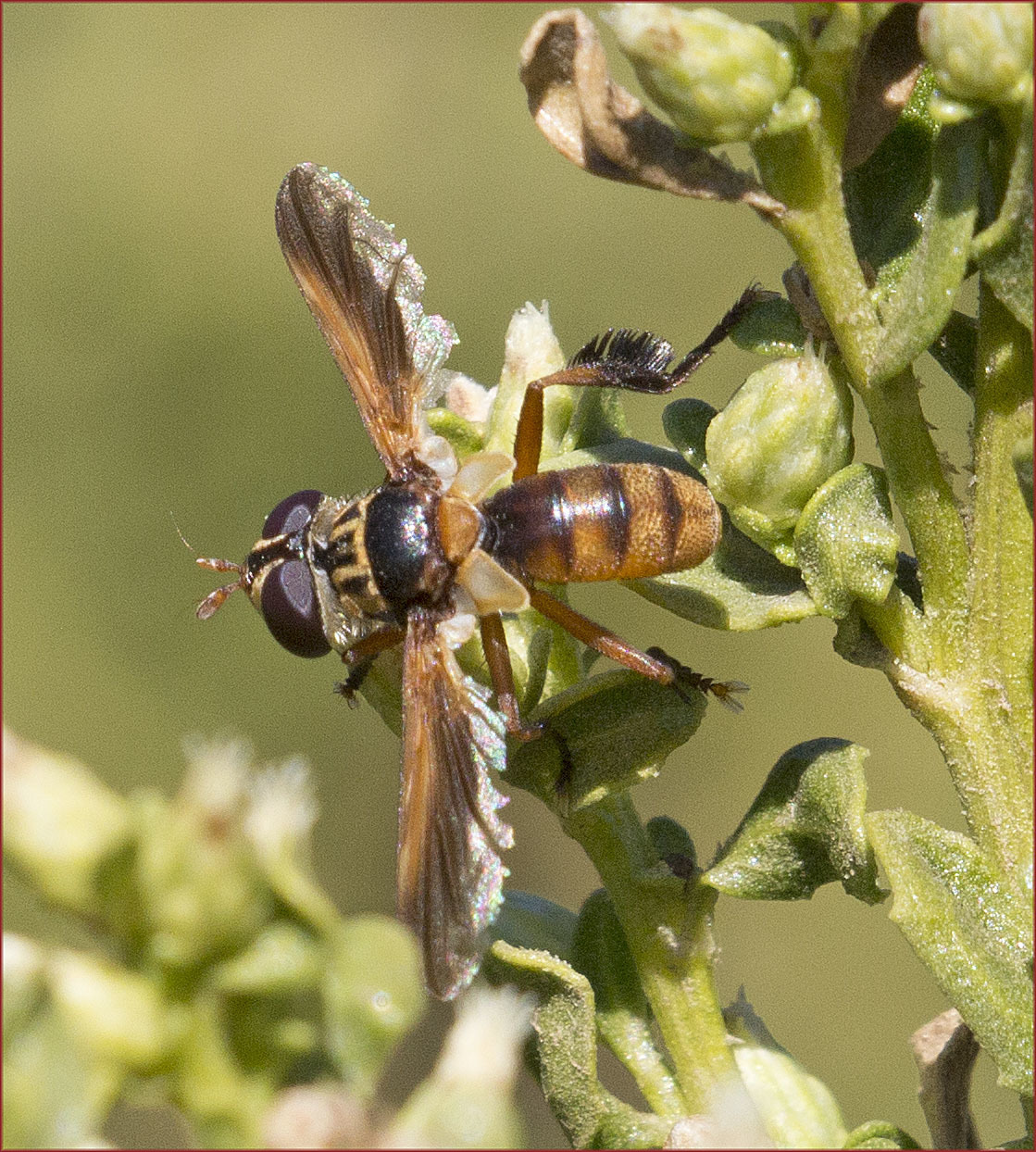

Scientific classification
- Kingdom: Animalia
- Phylum: Arthropoda
- Class: Insecta
- Order: Diptera
- Family: Tachinidae
- Subfamily: Phasiinae
- Tribe: Gymnosomatini
- Genus: Trichopoda
- Subgenus: Trichopoda
- Species: T. subdivisa

Binomial name
- Trichopoda subdivisa (Townsend, 1908)

Synonyms
- Polistomyia subdivisa Townsend, 1908

= Trichopoda subdivisa =

Species of fly

Trichopoda subdivisa, the fringe-legged tachinid fly, is a species of bristle fly in the family Tachinidae.

== Distribution ==
The species can be found in the United States.
