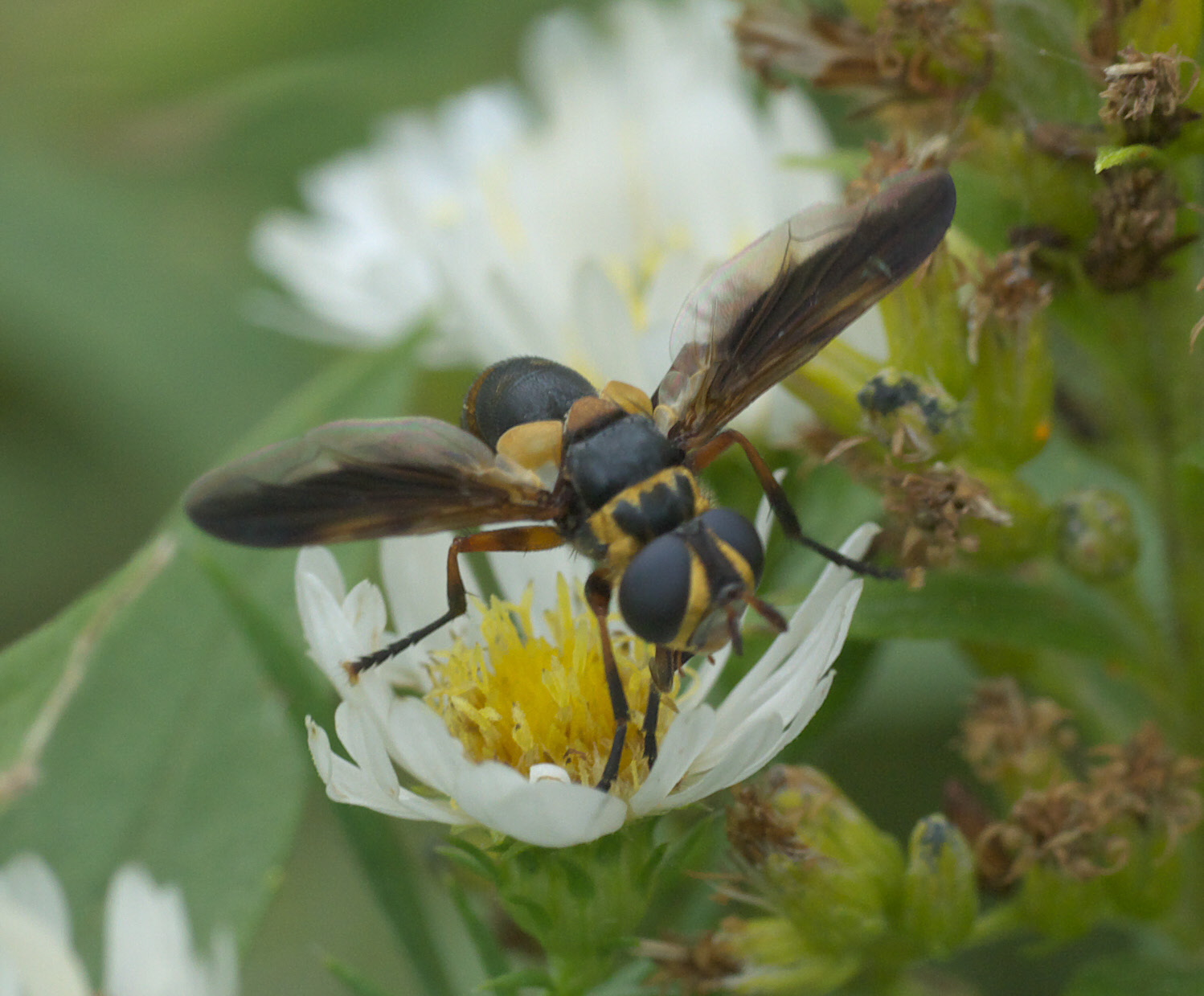

Scientific classification
- Kingdom: Animalia
- Phylum: Arthropoda
- Class: Insecta
- Order: Diptera
- Family: Tachinidae
- Subfamily: Phasiinae
- Tribe: Gymnosomatini
- Genus: Trichopoda
- Subgenus: Trichopoda
- Species: T. plumipes

Binomial name
- Trichopoda plumipes (Fabricius, 1805)

Synonyms
- Thereva plumipes Fabricius, 1805; Trichopoda histrio Walker, 1849; Trichopoda trifasciata Loew, 1863

= Trichopoda plumipes =

Species of fly

Trichopoda plumipes is a species of feather-legged fly in the family Tachinidae. The abdomen is black with pairs of rectangular yellow spots. It parasitizes bugs of the families Pentatomidae, Coreidae and others.

== Distribution ==
The species can be found in the United States and Mexico.
