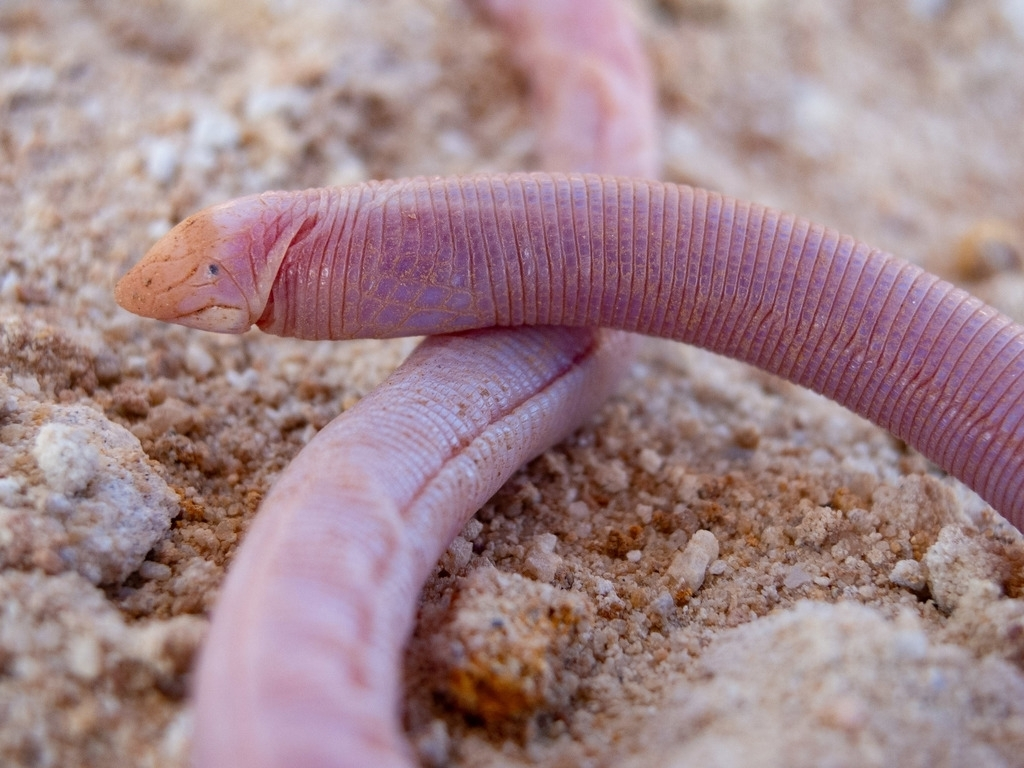

Conservation status
- Endangered (IUCN 3.1)

Scientific classification
- Kingdom: Animalia
- Phylum: Chordata
- Class: Reptilia
- Order: Squamata
- Clade: Amphisbaenia
- Family: Amphisbaenidae
- Genus: Leposternon
- Species: L. octostegum

Binomial name
- Leposternon octostegum (Duméril, 1851)

= Duméril's worm lizard =

Species of lizard

Duméril's worm lizard (Leposternon octostegum) is a worm lizard species in the family Amphisbaenidae. It is endemic to Brazil. The crested caracara is the only predator witnessed consuming this lizard, although it is likely a prey item for other predators. The species is considered endangered in Brazil due to its narrow geographic range.
