= Leposternon bagual =

Scientific classification
- Kingdom: Animalia
- Phylum: Chordata
- Class: Reptilia
- Order: Squamata
- Clade: Amphisbaenia
- Family: Amphisbaenidae
- Genus: Leposternon
- Species: L. bagual

Binomial name
- Leposternon bagual Ribeiro, Santos Jr., & Zaher, 2015

Species of lizard

Leposternon bagual is a worm lizard species in the family Amphisbaenidae. It is found in Argentina.
