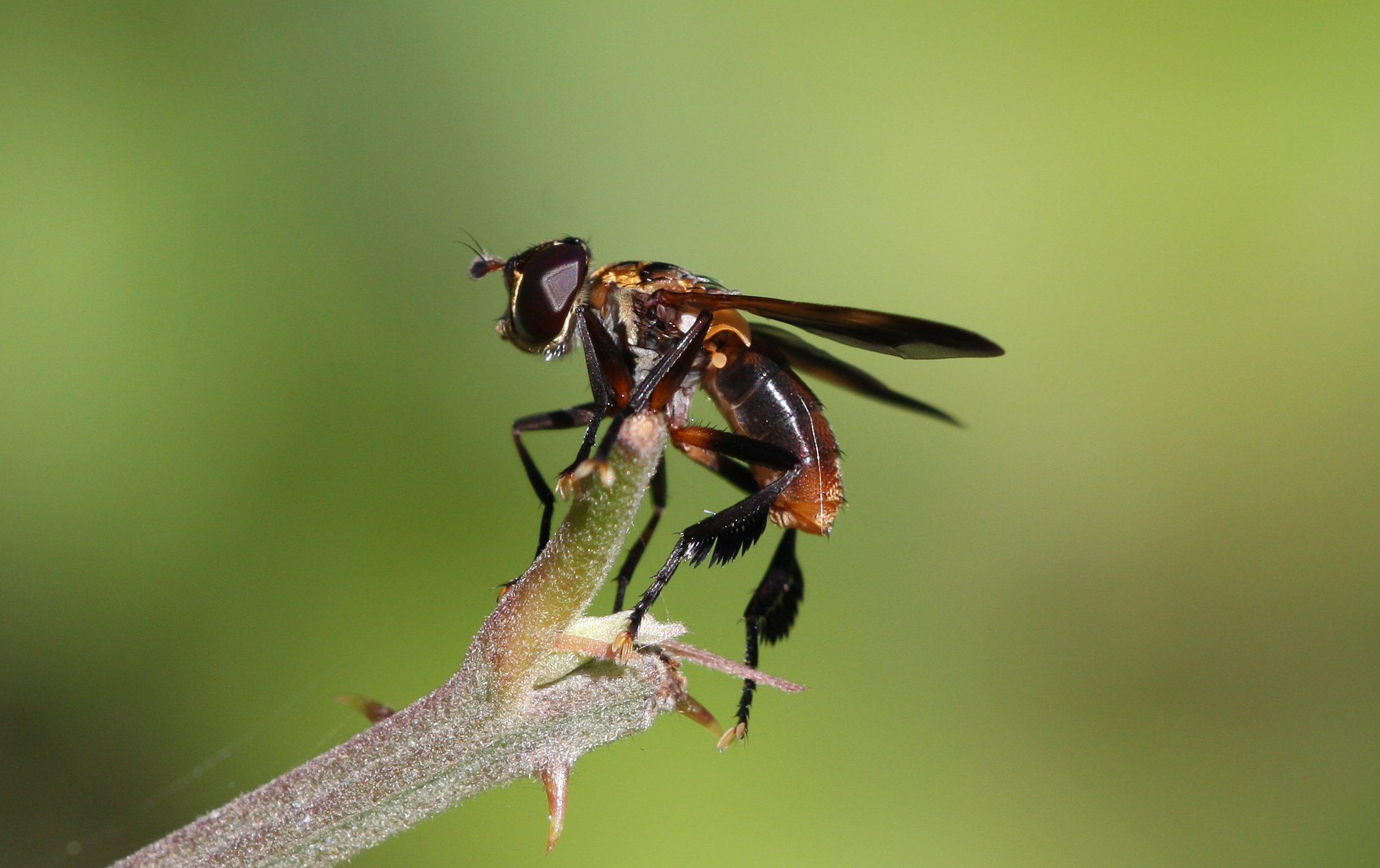
- Trichopoda pennipes

Scientific classification
- Kingdom: Animalia
- Phylum: Arthropoda
- Class: Insecta
- Order: Diptera
- Family: Tachinidae
- Subfamily: Phasiinae
- Tribe: Gymnosomatini
- Genus: Trichopoda
- Subgenus: Galactomyia; Townsend, 1908

Type species
- Trichopoda radiata Loew, 1863

Synonyms
- Trichopodopsis Townsend, 1913; Eutrichopodopsis Blanchard, 1966

= Galactomyia =

Subgenus of flies

squash bug with Tachinid fly eggs attached and a feather-legged tachinid fly, probably Trichopoda pennipes, quickly depositing another egg on it.

Galactomyia (commonly known as the feather-legged fly or hairy-legged fly) is a subgenus of tachinid flies. They are found in North and South America.

== Species ==
- Trichopoda auricauda Dios & Nihei, 2020
- Trichopoda castannea Dios & Nihei, 2020
- Trichopoda curvicercus Dios & Nihei, 2020
- Trichopoda dupuisi Dios & Nihei, 2020
- Trichopoda elongata Dios & Nihei, 2020
- Trichopoda eupilipes Dios & Nihei, 2020
- Trichopoda flava Röder, 1885
- Trichopoda goliana Dios & Nihei, 2020
- Trichopoda lanipes (Fabricius, 1805)
- Trichopoda nigricauda Bigot, 1876
- Trichopoda pennipes Fabricius, 1781
- Trichopoda pictipennis Bigot, 1876
- Trichopoda pilipes (Fabricius, 1805)
- Trichopoda splendida Dios & Nihei, 2020
- Trichopoda subalipes Townsend, 1897
- Trichopoda tenebrosa Dios & Nihei, 2020
- Trichopoda tschorsnigi Dios & Nihei, 2020
- Trichopoda umbra Walker, 1849
- Trichopoda urucurytuba Dios & Nihei, 2020
