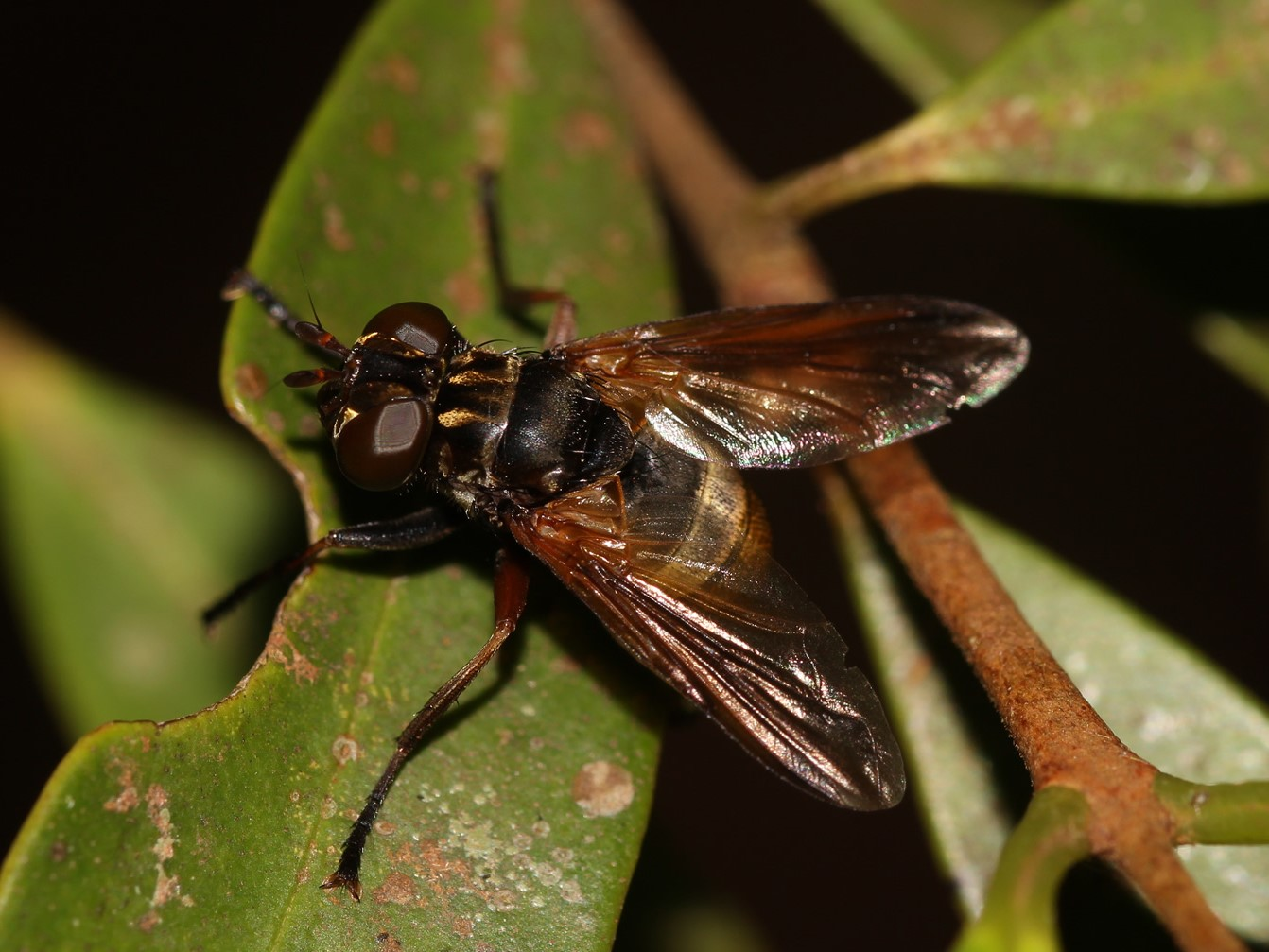

Scientific classification
- Kingdom: Animalia
- Phylum: Arthropoda
- Class: Insecta
- Order: Diptera
- Family: Tachinidae
- Subfamily: Phasiinae
- Tribe: Gymnosomatini
- Genus: Trichopoda
- Subgenus: Trichopoda
- Species: T. sabroskyi

Binomial name
- Trichopoda sabroskyi Dios & Nihei, 2020

= Trichopoda sabroskyi =

Species of fly

Trichopoda sabroskyi, is a species of bristle fly in the family Tachinidae.

== Distribution ==
The species can be found in Brazil.
