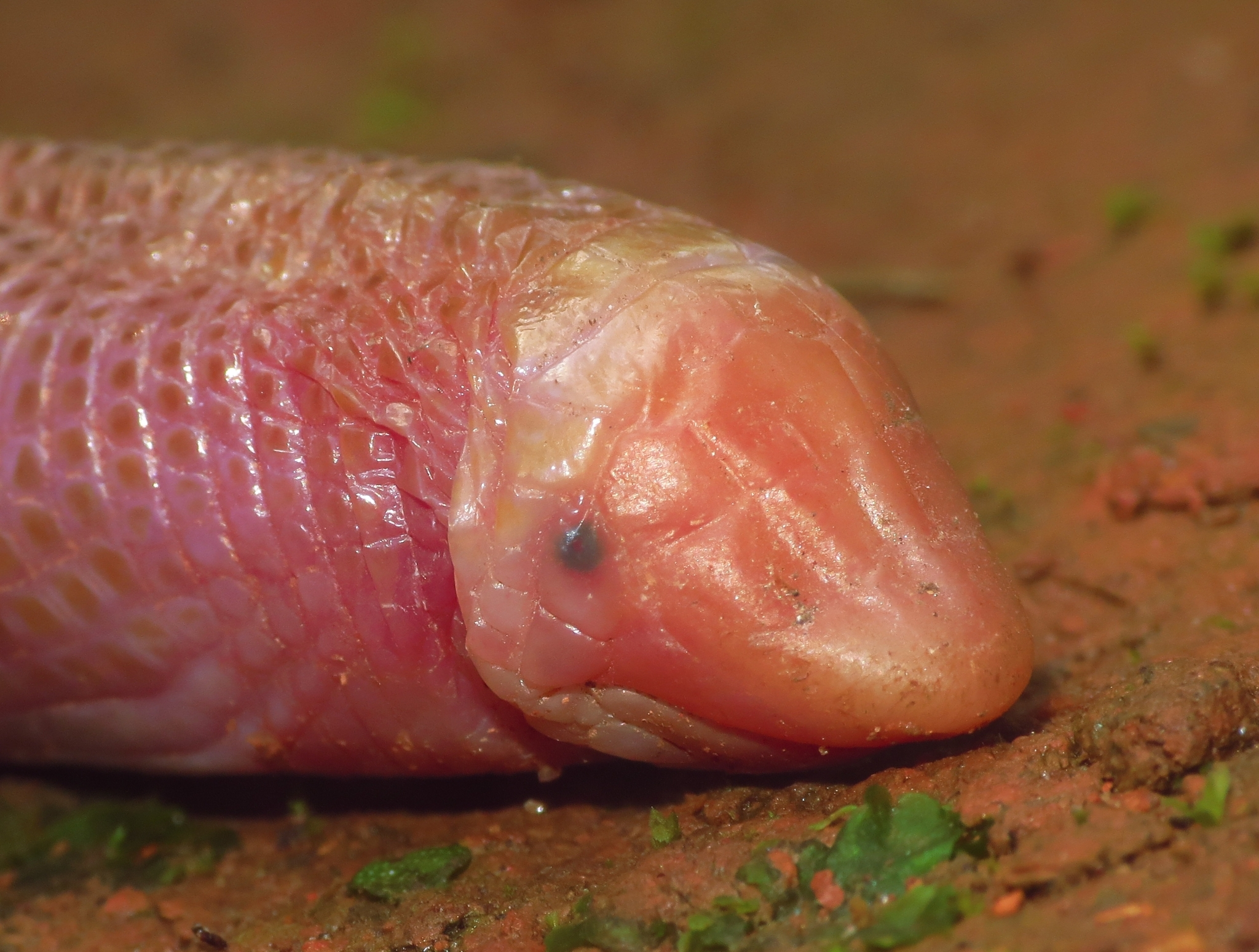
- In Brazil
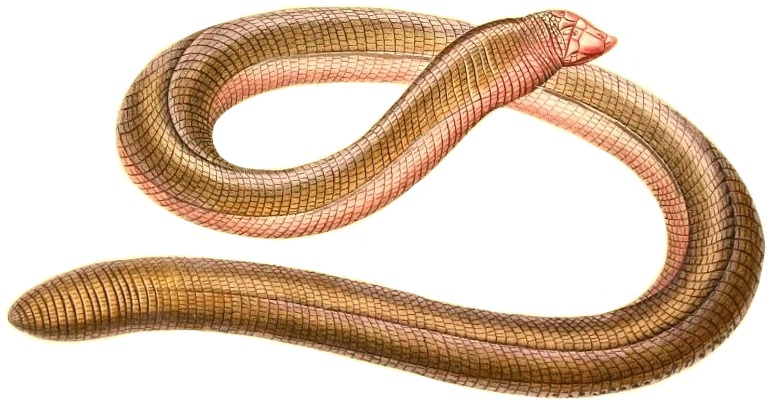
- Illustration

Conservation status
- Least Concern (IUCN 3.1)

Scientific classification
- Kingdom: Animalia
- Phylum: Chordata
- Class: Reptilia
- Order: Squamata
- Clade: Amphisbaenia
- Family: Amphisbaenidae
- Genus: Leposternon
- Species: L. microcephalus

Binomial name
- Leposternon microcephalus Wagler, 1824

Synonyms
- Leposternon microcephalum Wagler, 1824; Lepidosternon microcephalum (Wagler, 1824); Amphisbaena microcephalum (Wagler, 1824); Amphisbaena microcephala (Wagler, 1824); Amphisbaena punctata Wied, 1825; Lepidosternon maximiliani Wiegmann, 1834; Lepidosternon phocaena A.M.C. Duméril & Bibron, 1839; Lepidosternon crassum Strauch, 1881; Lepidosternon güntheri Strauch, 1881; Leposternon guntheri (Strauch, 1881); Lepidosternon petersi Strauch, 1881; Lepidosternum affine Boettger, 1885; Lepidosternum boulengeri Boettger, 1885; Lepidosternum onychocephalum Boettger, 1885; Lepidosternum strauchi Boettger, 1885; Lepidosternon boettgeri Boulenger, 1885; Lepidosternum latifrontale Boulenger, 1894; Lepidosternum borelli Peracca, 1895; Lepidosternum camerani Peracca, 1895; Lepidosternon laticeps Peracca, 1904; Lepidosternon carcani Peracca, 1904; Lepidosternon pfefferi F. Werner, 1910

= Leposternon microcephalum =

Leposternon microcephalus

Species of lizard

Leposternon microcephalus, also known commonly as the smallhead worm lizard, is a species of amphisbaenian in the family Amphisbaenidae in the reptilian order Squamata. The species is endemic to South America.

== Local common names ==
Common names for Leposternon microcephalus in Brazilian Portuguese include cobra de duas cabeças (two headed snake) and cobra cega (blind snake).

== Geographic distribution ==
Leposternon microcephalus is found in southern Brazil, Bolivia, Paraguay, Uruguay, and northern Argentina. It occurs in the Itatiaia National Park between Rio de Janeiro and Minas Gerais in Brazil.

== Habitat ==
The preferred natural habitats of Leposternon microcephalus are grassland, savanna, and forest.

== Behavior ==
Leposternon microcephalus is terrestrial and fossorial.

== Diet ==
Leposternon microcephalus preys predominately upon earthworms.

== Ecology ==
Amphisbaenians have few predators due to their fossorial habits, powerful bite, and defensive tactics. However, some snakes have been found feeding on amphisbaenians including Leposternon microcephalus.

== Reproduction ==
Leposternon microcephalus is oviparous.
