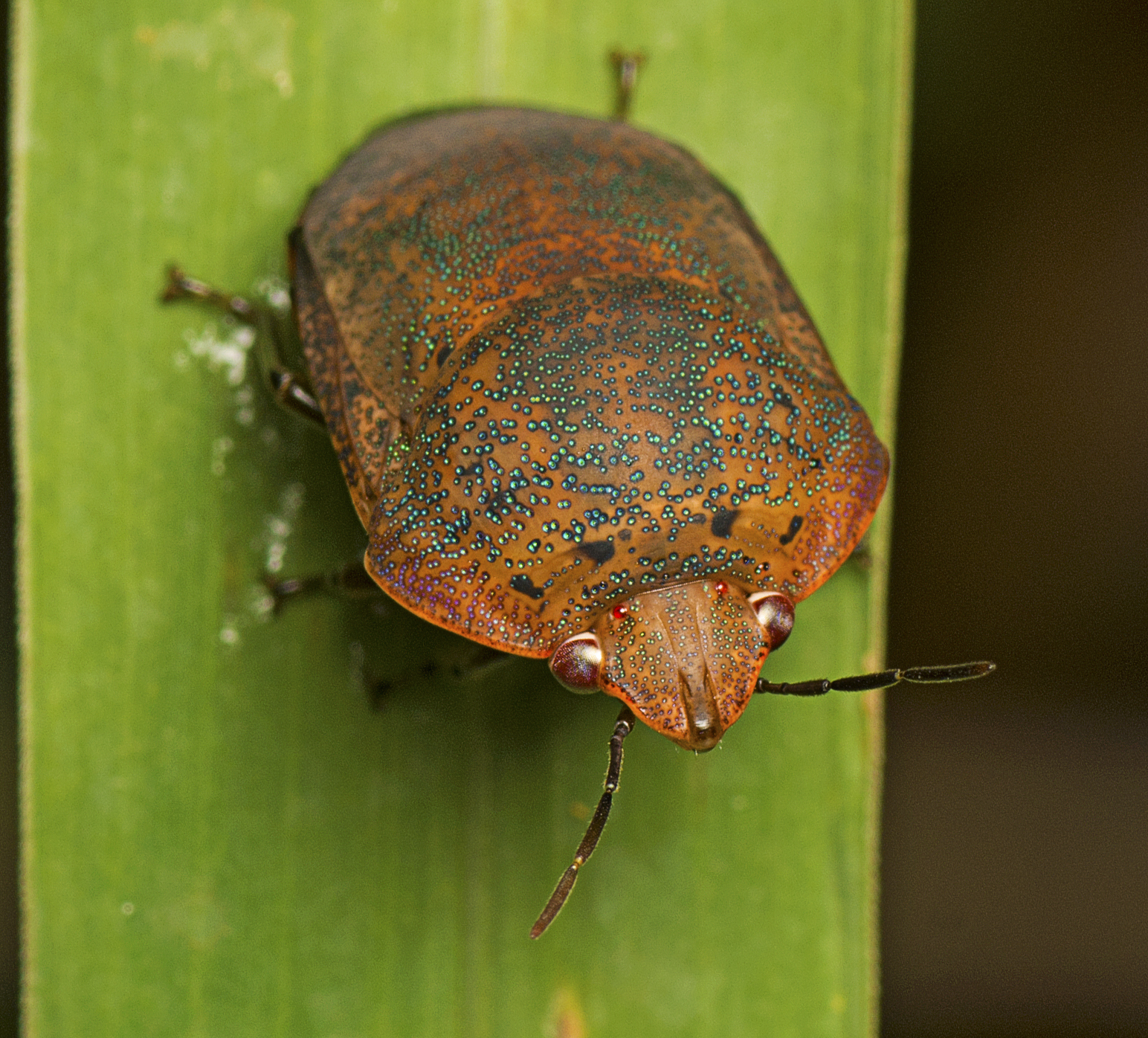
- Coleotichus artensis, Australia

Scientific classification
- Domain: Eukaryota
- Kingdom: Animalia
- Phylum: Arthropoda
- Class: Insecta
- Order: Hemiptera
- Suborder: Heteroptera
- Family: Scutelleridae
- Subfamily: Elvisurinae
- Genus: Coleotichus; White, 1839

= Coleotichus =

Genus of insects

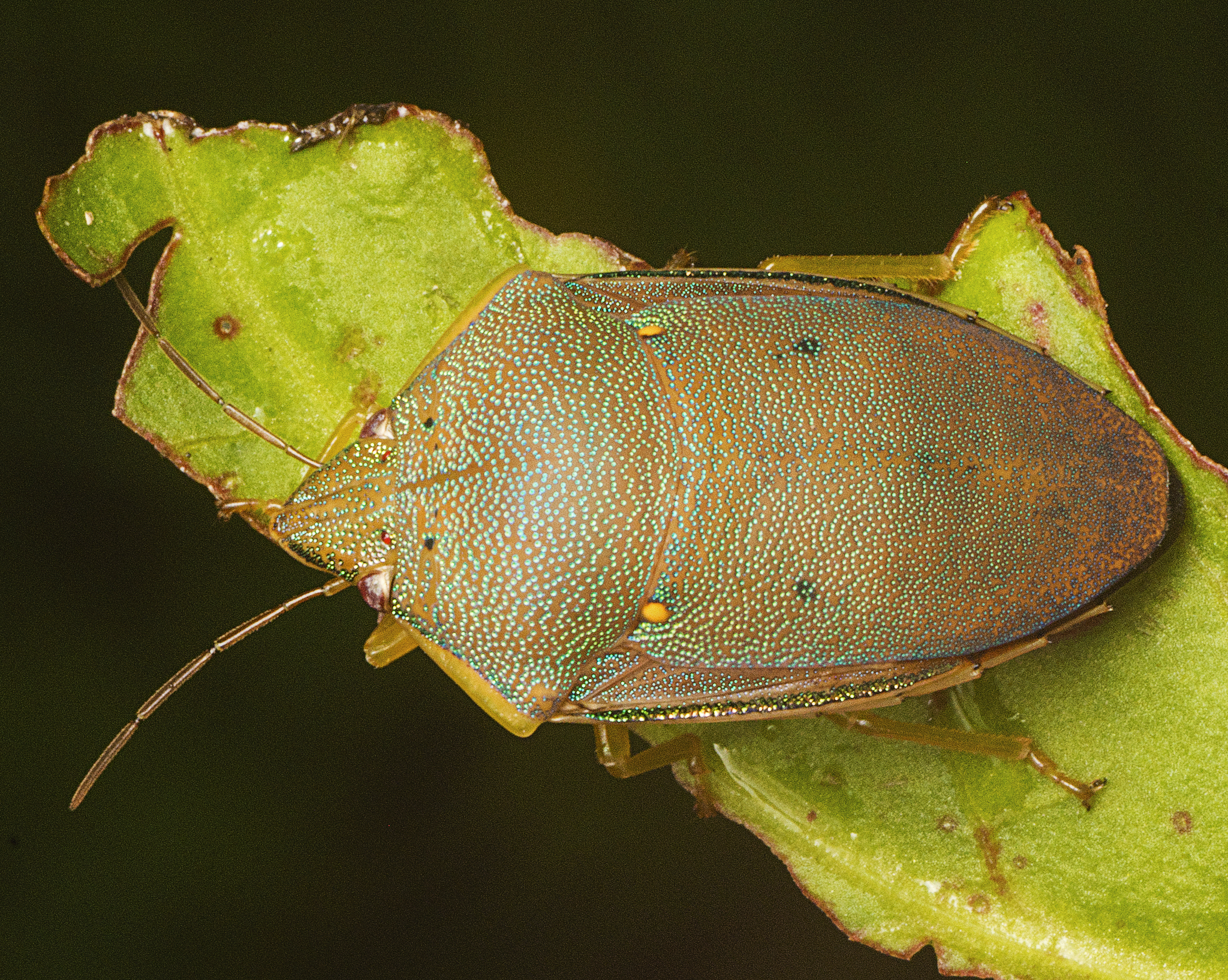
Coleotichus excellens, Australia

Coleotichus is a genus of shield-backed bugs in the family Scutelleridae. Species of Coleotichus can be found in Oceania and Pacific Islands.

== Species ==
The following are included in BioLib.cz:

subgenus Epicoleotichus Schouteden, 1904

1. Coleotichus borealis Distant, 1899
2. Coleotichus marianensis Usinger, 1946

subgenus Paracoleotichus Schouteden, 1904

1. Coleotichus breddini Schouteden, 1905

unplaced species

1. Coleotichus adamsoni Van Duzee, 1932
2. Coleotichus artensis (Montrouzier, 1858)
3. Coleotichus bakeri Taeuber, 1929
4. Coleotichus biroi Schouteden, 1905
5. Coleotichus blackburniae White, 1881
6. Coleotichus bulowi Schouteden, 1905
7. Coleotichus costatus (Fabricius, 1787)
8. Coleotichus excellens Walker, 1867
9. Coleotichus fuscus Vollenhoven, 1863
10. Coleotichus ornamentifer Bergroth, 1915
11. Coleotichus sumatranus Breddin, 1900
