= Shielded worm lizard =

Conservation status
- Endangered (IUCN 3.1)

Scientific classification
- Kingdom: Animalia
- Phylum: Chordata
- Class: Reptilia
- Order: Squamata
- Clade: Amphisbaenia
- Family: Amphisbaenidae
- Genus: Leposternon
- Species: L. scutigerum

Binomial name
- Leposternon scutigerum Hemprich, 1820

Species of lizard

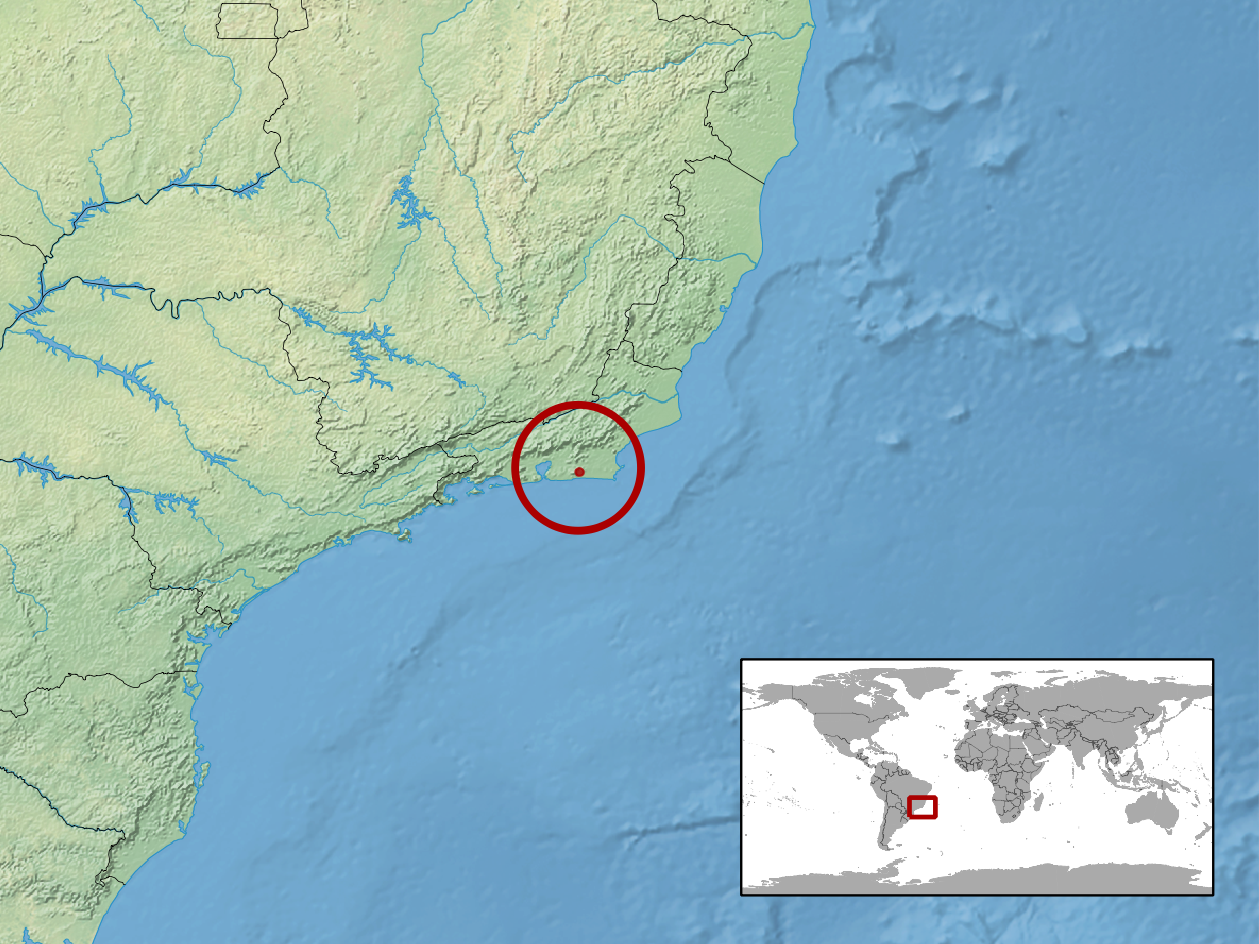

The shielded worm lizard (Leposternon scutigerum) is a worm lizard species in the family Amphisbaenidae. It is endemic to Brazil.
