= Trichopoda splendida =

Scientific classification
- Kingdom: Animalia
- Phylum: Arthropoda
- Class: Insecta
- Order: Diptera
- Family: Tachinidae
- Subfamily: Phasiinae
- Tribe: Gymnosomatini
- Genus: Trichopoda
- Subgenus: Galactomyia
- Species: T. splendida

Binomial name
- Trichopoda splendida Dios & Nihei, 2020

Species of fly

Trichopoda splendida, is a species of bristle fly in the family Tachinidae.

== Distribution ==
The species can be found in Brazil.
