= Leposternon mineiro =

Scientific classification
- Kingdom: Animalia
- Phylum: Chordata
- Class: Reptilia
- Order: Squamata
- Clade: Amphisbaenia
- Family: Amphisbaenidae
- Genus: Leposternon
- Species: L. mineiro

Binomial name
- Leposternon mineiro Ribeiro, Lima-Silveira, & Santos Jr., 2018

Species of lizard

Leposternon mineiro is a worm lizard species in the family Amphisbaenidae. It is found in Brazil.
