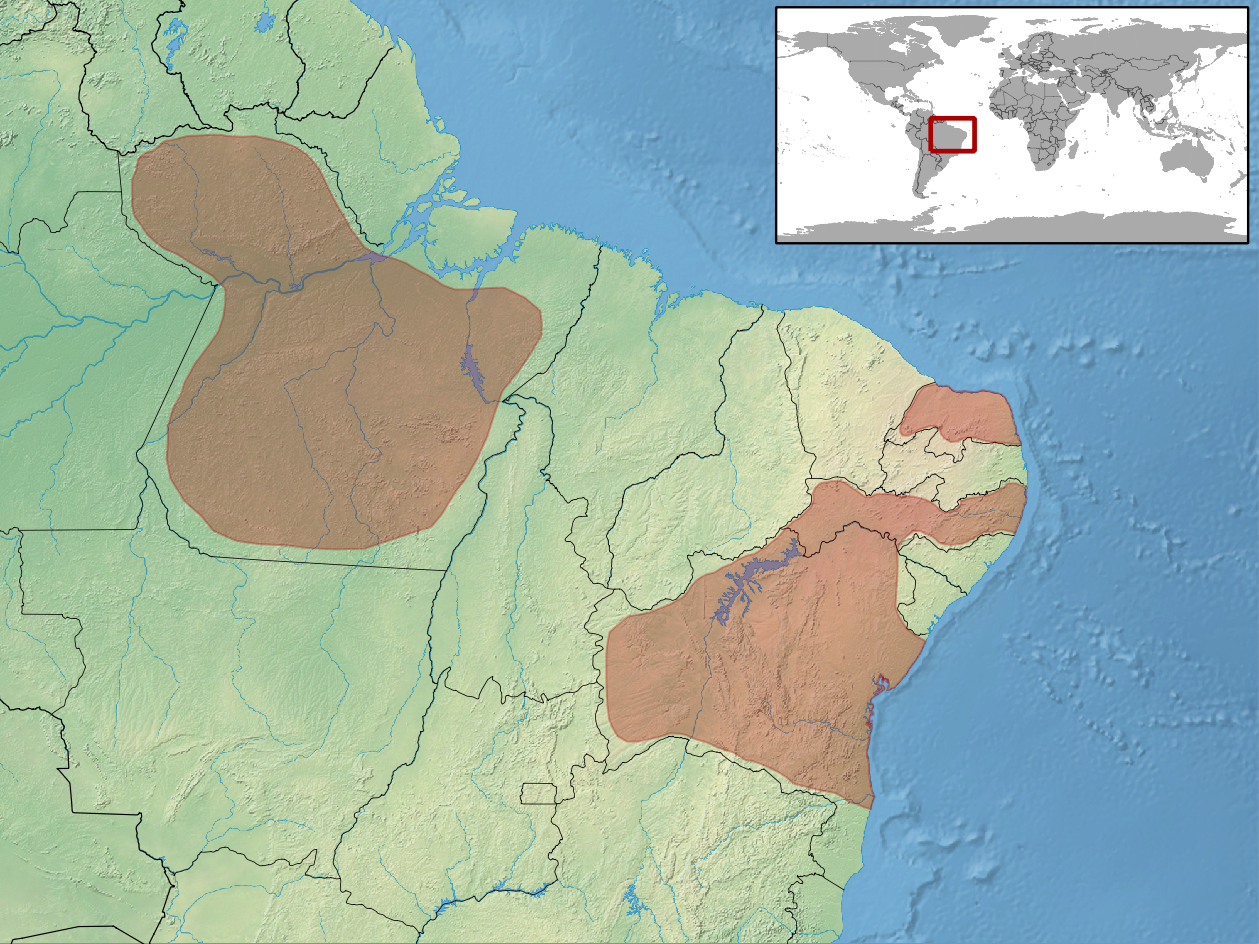
- Geographical distribution of Leposternon polystegum.

Conservation status
- Least Concern (IUCN 3.1)

Scientific classification
- Kingdom: Animalia
- Phylum: Chordata
- Class: Reptilia
- Order: Squamata
- Clade: Amphisbaenia
- Family: Amphisbaenidae
- Genus: Leposternon
- Species: L. polystegum

Binomial name
- Leposternon polystegum (Duméril, 1851)

= Bahia worm lizard =

Species of lizard

The Bahia worm lizard (Leposternon polystegum) is a worm lizard species in the family Amphisbaenidae. It is endemic to Brazil.

This species demonstrates sexual dimorphism with the males having larger, longer bodies than the females.

Its diet generally consists of ants, earthworms, and termites.
