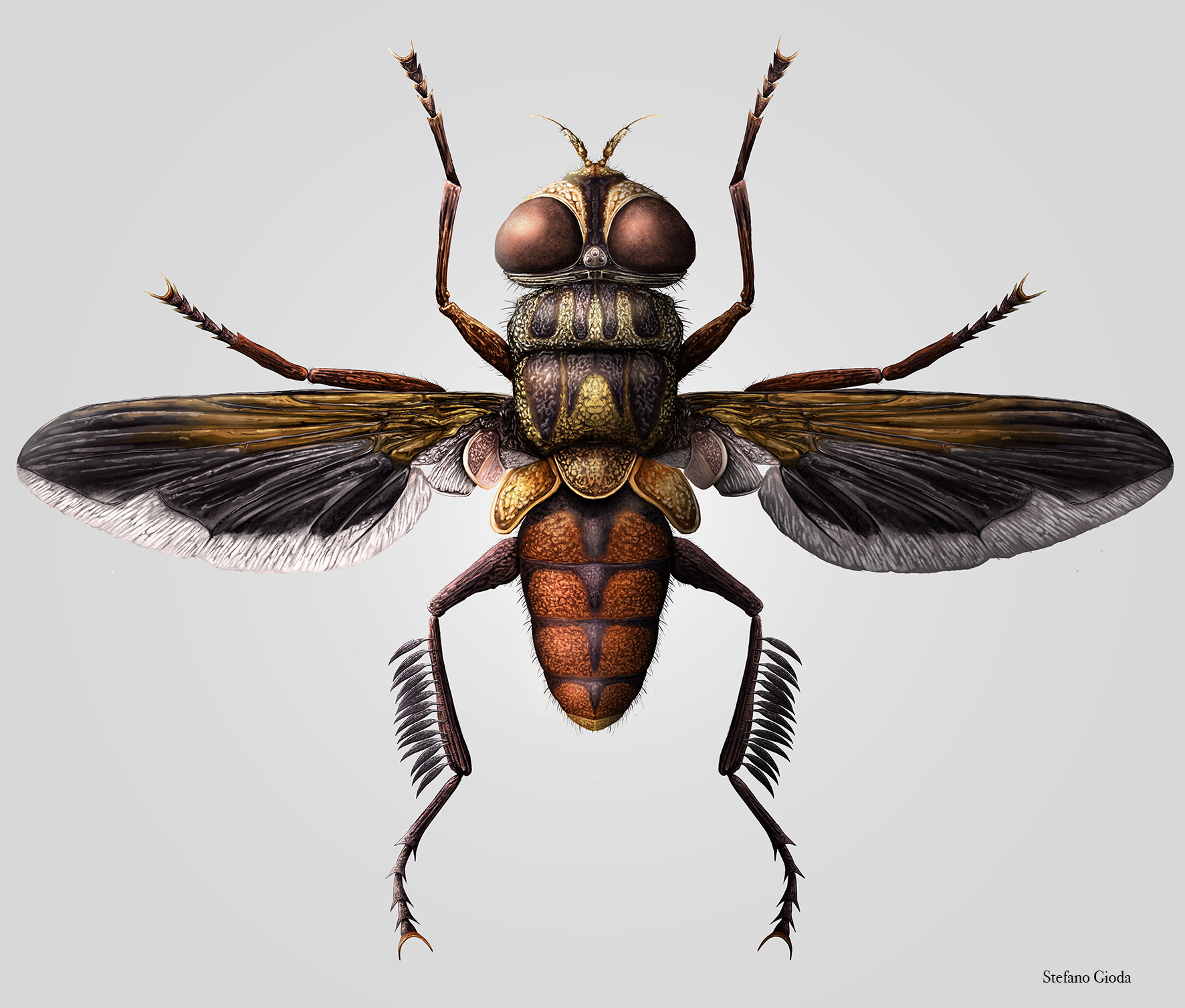
- Trichopoda pennipes

Scientific classification
- Kingdom: Animalia
- Phylum: Arthropoda
- Class: Insecta
- Order: Diptera
- Family: Tachinidae
- Subfamily: Phasiinae
- Tribe: Gymnosomatini
- Genus: Trichopoda
- Subgenus: Galactomyia
- Species: T. pennipes

Binomial name
- Trichopoda pennipes (Fabricius, 1781)

Synonyms
- Musca pennipes Fabricius, 1781; Phasia jugatoria Say, 1829; Thereva hirtipes Fabricius, 1805; Thereva pennipes Fabricius, 1805; Trichopoda cilipes Wiedemann, 1830; Trichopoda flavicornis Robineau-Desvoidy, 1830; Trichopodopsis giacomellii Blanchard, 1966; Eutrichopodopsis funebris Blanchard, 1966; Eutrichopodopsis nitens Blanchard, 1966; Eutrichopodopsis imitans Blanchard, 1966; Eutrichopodopsis similis Blanchard, 1966; Eutrichopodopsis bruchi Blanchard, 1966; Trichopodopsis nigrifrontalis Blanchard, 1966; Trichopodopsis bosqi Blanchard, 1966; Trichopoda gustavoi Mallea, Mácola & García, 1977

= Trichopoda pennipes =

Species of fly

Trichopoda pennipes is a species of feather-legged fly in the dipteran family Tachinidae.

== Distribution ==
This species is native to North America (United States, Mexico), Hawaiian Islands and South America and has been introduced into southern Europe (France, Italy and Spain).

== Habitat ==
This species inhabits grasslands, hedge rows and crops where its key hosts are present.

== Morphology ==
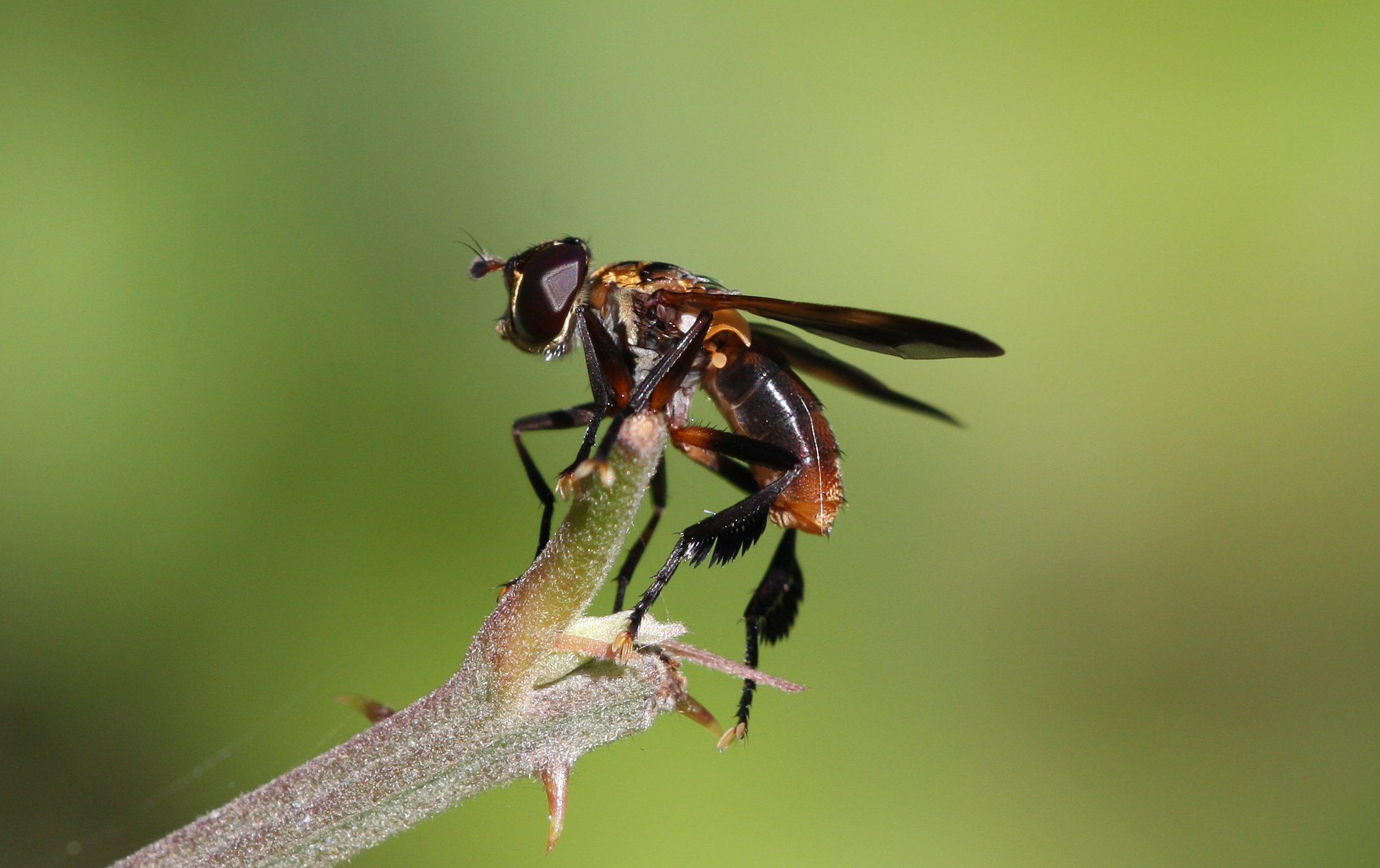
Trichopoda pennipes showing the comb-like fringe of flattened hairs

Trichopoda pennipes can reach a length of 10.5 millimetres (0.41 in), about the size of a large housefly. These medium-sized flies have a velvety, black head. The black or brown thorax shows a few yellow stripes. Eyes are large, brown with yellow between. The color of the slender abdomen varies from bright orange to completely black. Females usually have a dark-tipped abdomen, while males have a dark orange apex. Wings are transparent, smoky with prominent veins. In the females they are evenly dusky, with the posterior margin sub-hyaline. Male flies have a ferrugineous marking on the wings. This fly has huge halteres. Legs are black, with yellow feet. The hind legs bear a prominent feather-like fringe of flattened hairs.

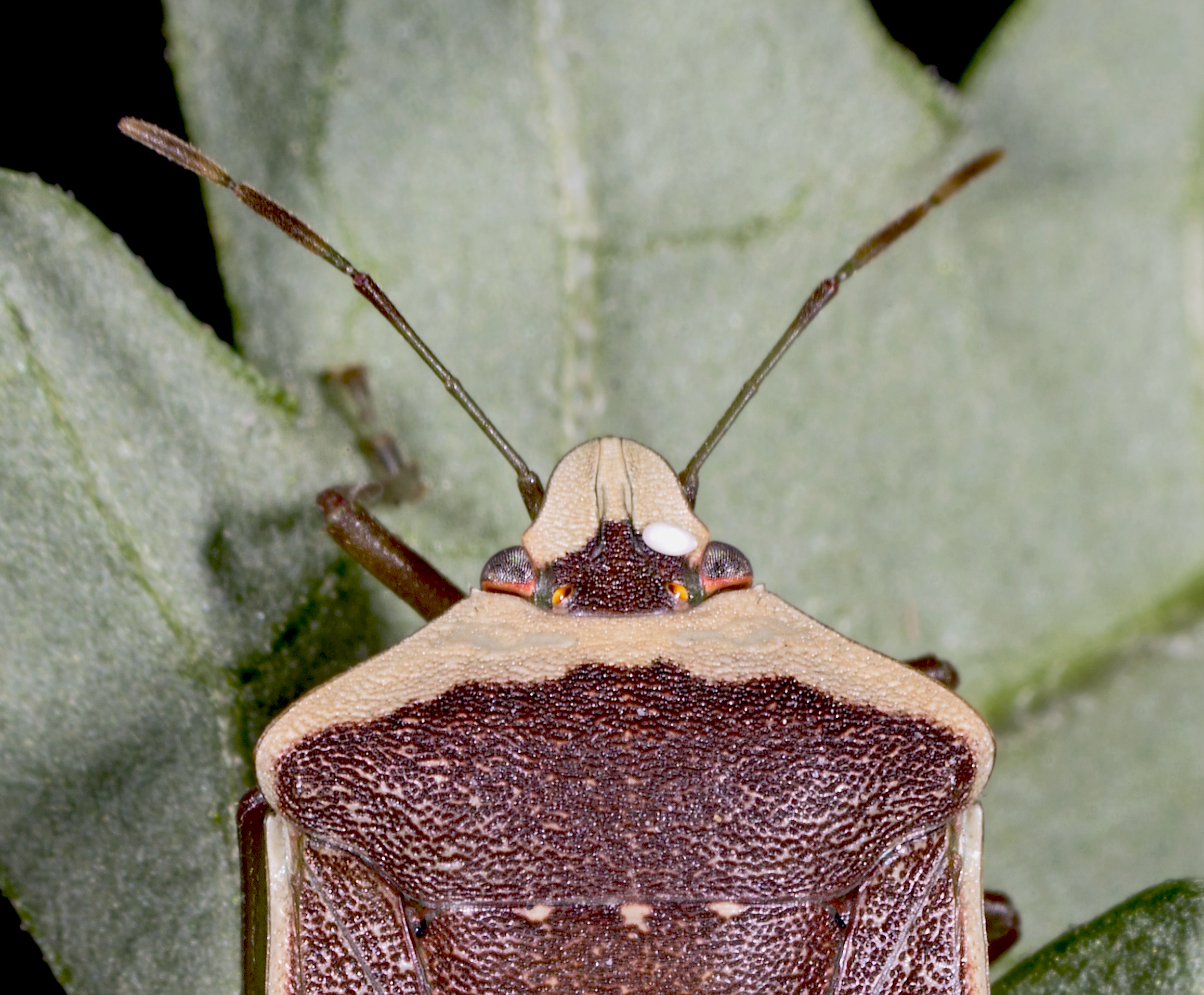
Egg on the head of a green stinkbug (Nezara viridula)

== Life cycle ==
Trichopoda pennipes first appears in the late spring or early summer and feeds on nectar sucked from flowers such as Queen Anne's lace and meadowsweet. It may be seen hovering over other plants in search of suitable bugs on which to lay its eggs, most commonly squash bugs and southern green stinkbugs. The female fly lays several small, pale-coloured, oval eggs on a large nymph or an adult bug. In fact the larvae are parasitoids of several true bugs, particularly squash bugs and leaf-footed bugs in the family Coreidae (including the large-sized Leptoglossus occidentalis), stinkbugs in the family Pentatomidae and other pentatomorph bugs (Largidae and Scutelleridae species).

When the eggs hatch, the larvae burrow into the bug. If there are several larvae in one host, only one survives. After feeding on the bug's tissues, the cream-coloured larva emerges and falls to the ground where it pupates in a reddish-brown puparium formed from the last larval skin. The bug meanwhile dies. After about two weeks, an adult fly emerges from the pupa. After mating, a female fly may lay several hundred eggs in total. There are up to three generations of the fly each year and the parasitoid overwinters as a second instar larva within the body of the overwintering host.

== Use in biological control ==
Trichopoda pennipes is used as a biological control agent for agricultural pests. One of the principal host species for T. pennipes is the southern green stinkbug, Nezara viridula. This is a crop pest that originated in Ethiopia but now has a worldwide distribution and is named for the foul-smelling defensive secretion it exudes from a gland on its thorax. This exudate appears to be fairly effective in preventing predation by birds but is well tolerated by T. pennipes which seems to be highly attracted by an aggregation pheromone produced by the male bugs. This results in a higher proportion of males being parasitised than females.

There seem to be different biotypes across the United States, preying on different hosts in different regions. In northern California, a population of the fly parasitised the bordered plant bug, Largus succinctus, but did not attack the squash bug, Anasa tristis. In an experiment, T. pennipes was collected from squash fields in New York State and released near squash fields in California. The insects targeted the squash bugs and established permanent populations. Their eggs are now found deposited on nearly 50% of the squash bugs in the area but it is unclear how effective this is in controlling the crop pests. On the southern green stink bug, the rate of parasitism can be as high as 93% and up to 80% on the squash bug. However, T. pennipes does not prevent all crop damage as the bugs continue to feed and reproduce after being parasitised, though the reproductive organs begin to atrophy when the parasitoid reaches the second instar stage. Control of the pest is more effective when nymphs are parasitised since half of these die before becoming adults and any that overwinter will die before laying eggs.

== Gallery ==
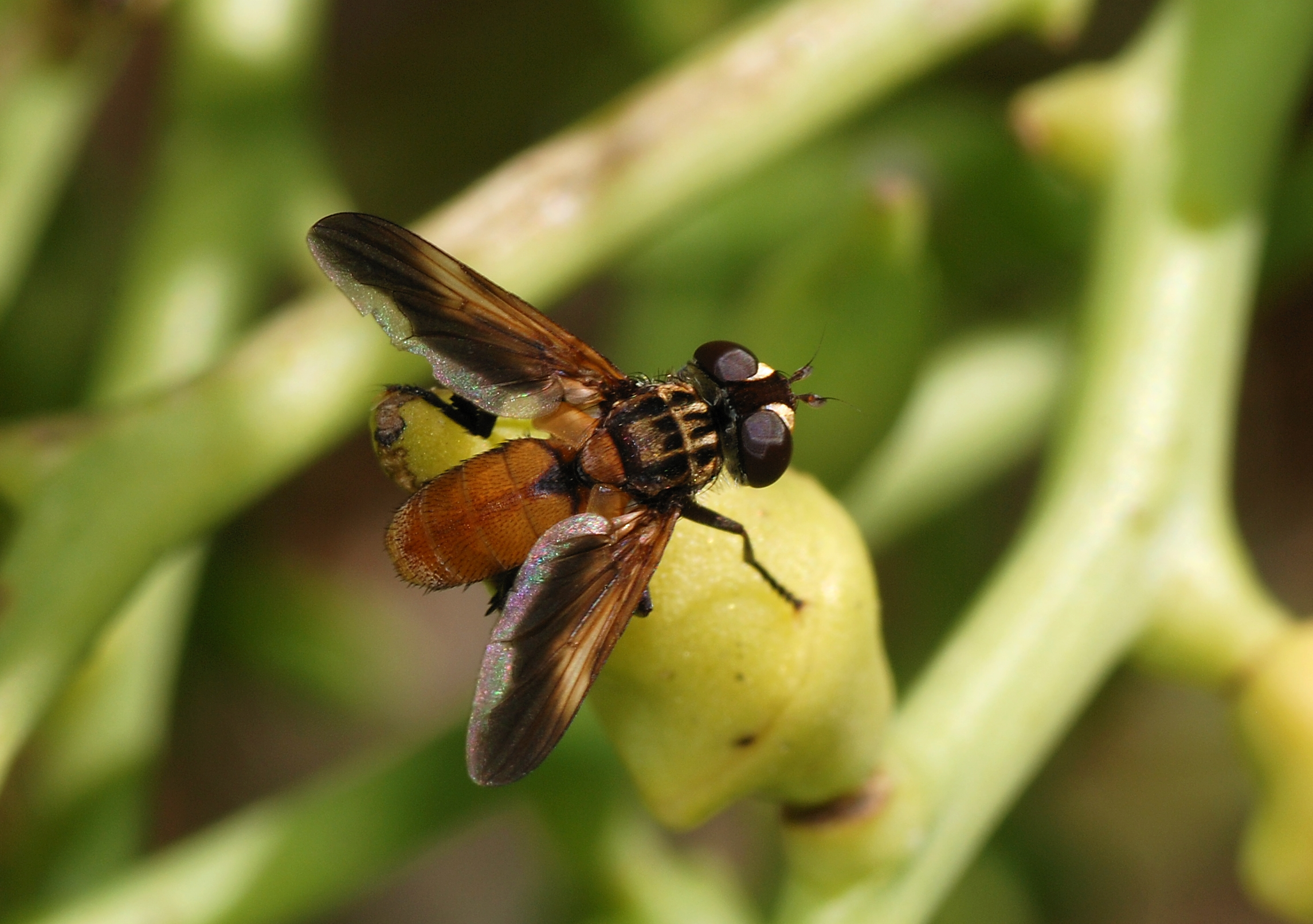
Male, with ferrugineous marking on the wings

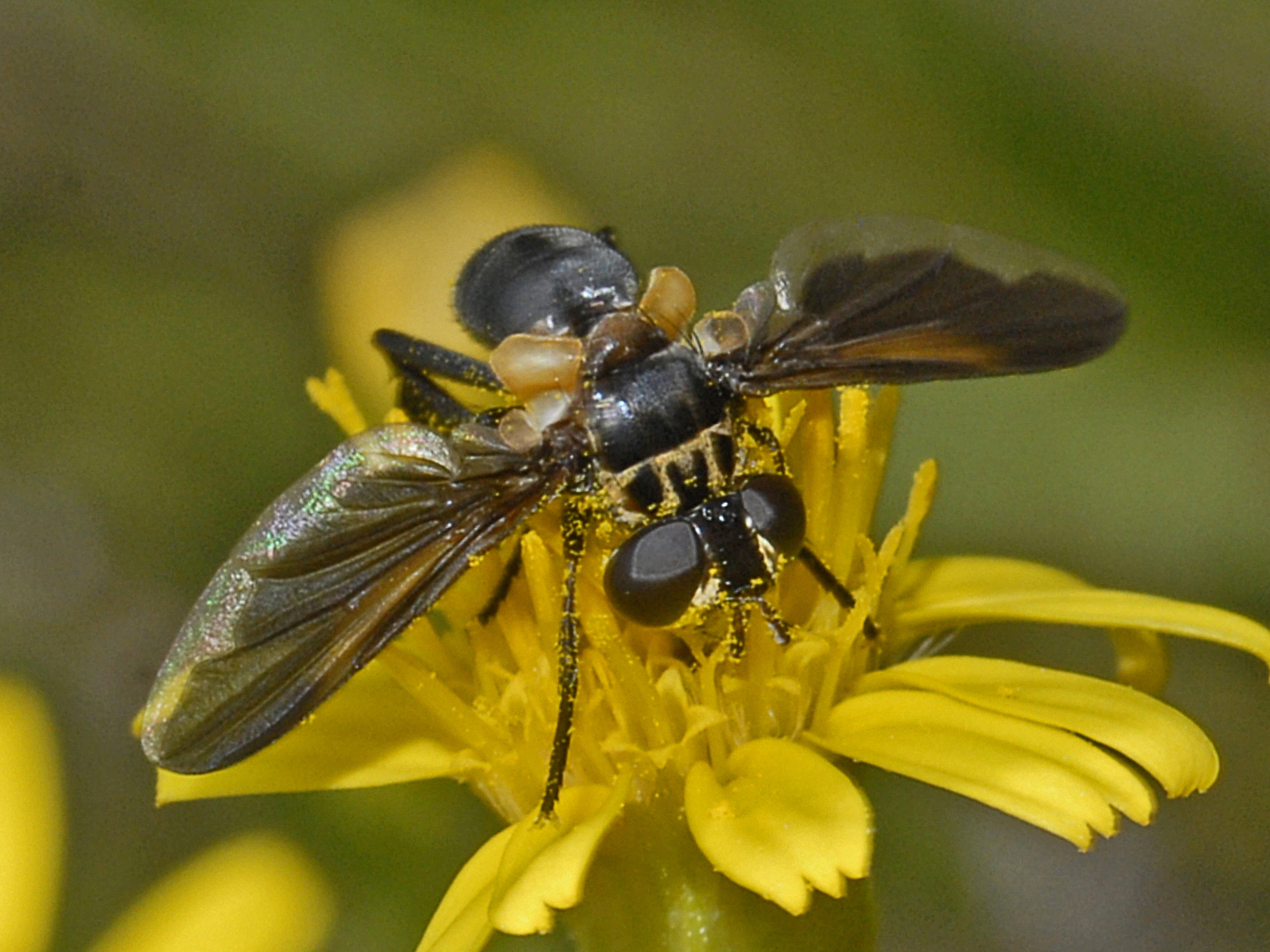
Female with black abdomen and evenly dusky wings, with the posterior margin sub-hyaline

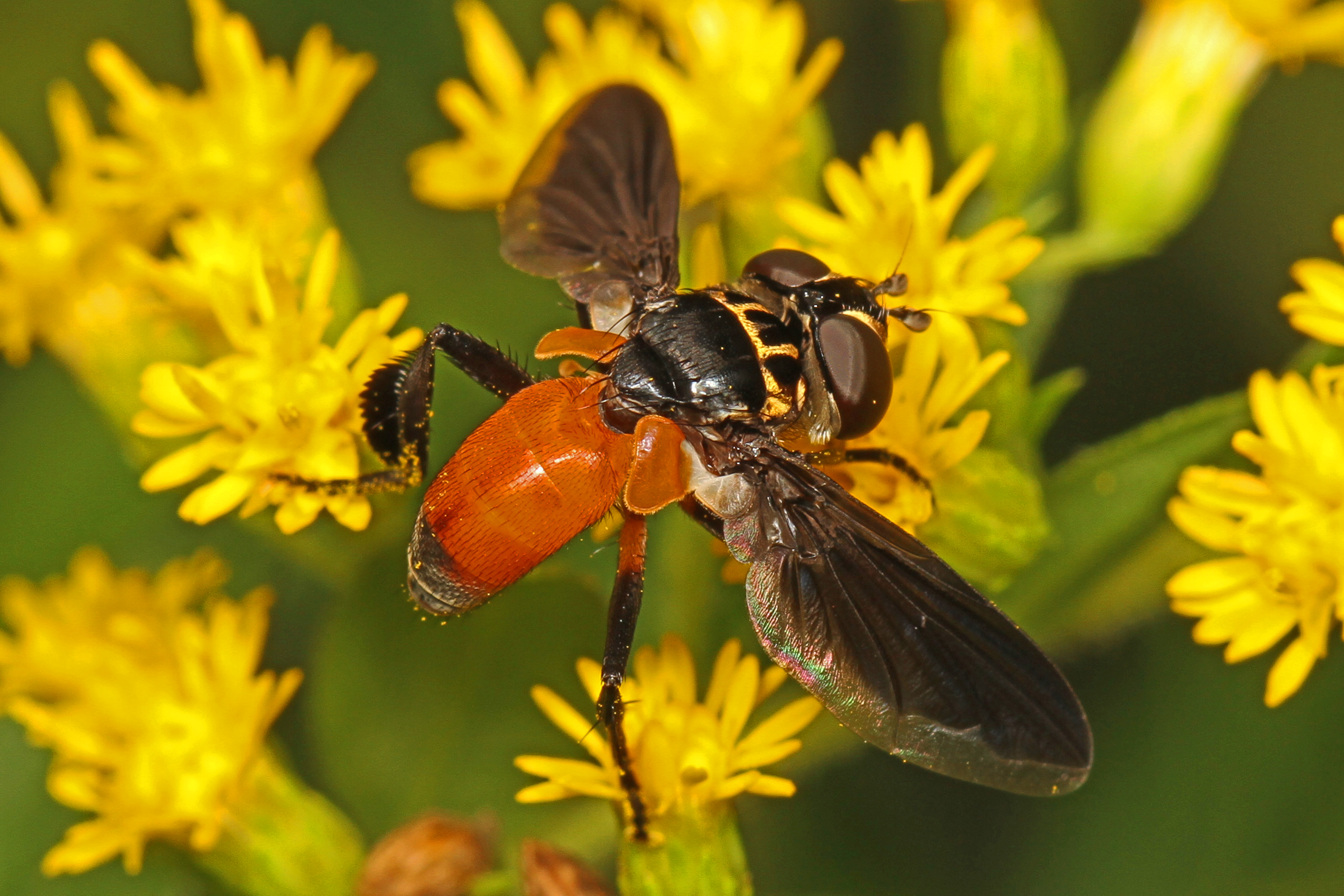
Female with orange black-tipped abdomen

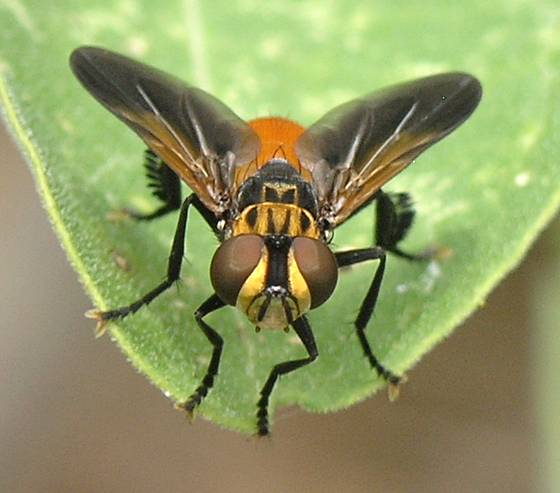
Front view
