= Arnold Adolph Berthold =

German physiologist and zoologist (1803–1861)

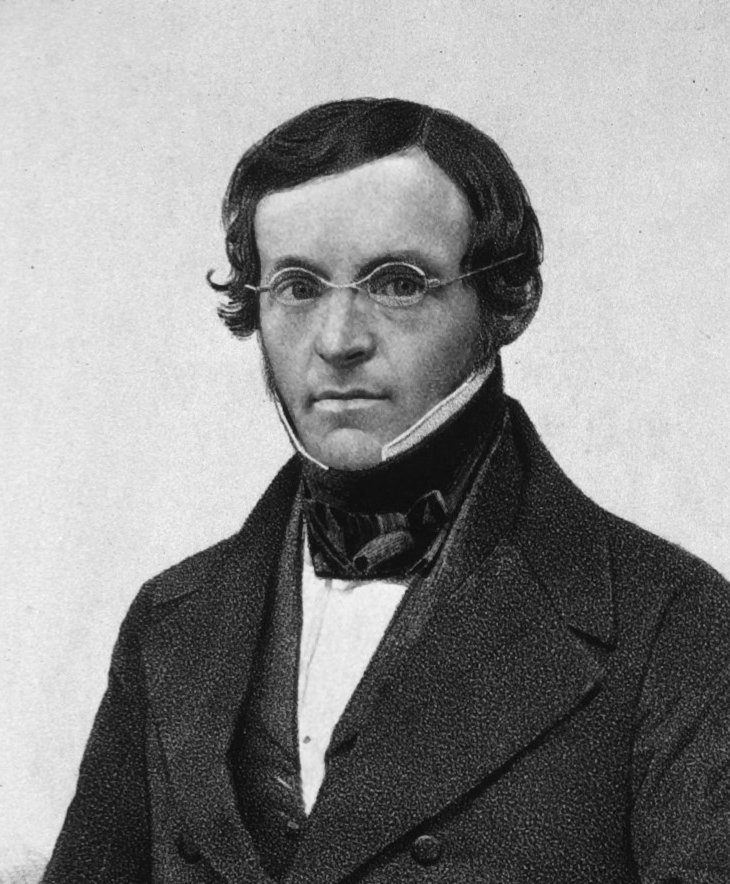
- Born: 26 February 1803; Soest, Germany
- Died: 3 January 1861 (aged 57); Göttingen, Germany
- Citizenship: Germany
- Scientific career
- Fields: Physiology, Zoology, Medicine (Endocrinology)
- Workplaces: University of Göttingen
- Author abbrev. (zoology): Berthold

Arnold Adolph Berthold (also Arnold Adolf Berthold) (26 February 1803, in Soest – 3 January 1861, in Göttingen) was a German scientist, most notably a physiologist and zoologist. He is best known in modern science for his pioneering experiments in the field of endocrinology. He published works on herpetology, ornithology, entomology and chemistry.

== Early life and education ==
Berthold was the second-youngest of six children. His father was a carpenter and his family was not wealthy. He went to the local gymnasium (equivalent to a grammar school) where he studied the classics but was most interested in natural history. He followed his older brother's example to study medicine at University of Göttingen in August 1819. His thesis was under the direction of Johann Friedrich Blumenbach (1752–1840) and he qualified on 10 September 1823.

== Career ==
He remained at Göttingen for a year before doing a tour of other universities and clinics, which included meeting Johann Lukas Schönlein. In 1825, Berthold decided to practise medicine in Berlin and began experimenting on the effects of coal gas and mercury on the body. Unsettled, he continued to tour Germany and Franc, attending the lectures of other contemporary luminaries Georges Cuvier, Étienne Geoffroy Saint-Hilaire and André Marie Constant Duméril. He forwent the idea of private medical practice and wrote a paper on the thyroid gland of the parrot. He returned to his alma mater as a privatdozent in medicine and began to teach physiology; he spent the rest of his career there. He was appointed as an extraordinary professor in 1835 and a full professor in 1836. In 1840, he was made zoological director of the museum.

He published on the topics of the duration of pregnancy, hair growth, myopia and hermaphroditism. In 1829, he published Lehrbuch der Physiologie des Menschen und der Thiere (Textbook on the physiology of humans and animals) which was reprinted a number of times. He collaborated with Robert Bunsen in 1834 to develop the usage of hydrated iron oxide as an antidote for arsenic poisoning. Berthold and K.J.M. Langenbeck assumed, essentially, the leadership of the teaching of anatomy and physiology over the ageing Blumenbach. In 1840, Blumenbach died and his role was taken over by Rudolf Wagner (Berthold wrote a 20-page section on the topic of sexual physiology in a dictionary on physiology that Wagner edited). Berthold taught and encouraged the young Carl Bergmann (anatomist), who became known for experiments on thermoregulation and who coined the terms poikilotherm and homeotherm.

== Experiments in endocrinology ==
Some of Berthold's previous publications were specifically linked to glands. Scientists up until the 19th century had little idea how glands affected the body. Castrati - men who were castrated before puberty - were kept in harems to ensure females remained chaste; from the Middle Ages boys were castrated to keep youthful-sounding singing voices due to the lack of an Adam's apple, but in adulthood they also kept a straight hairline, grew large chests and unusually long limbs. Whole-body effects were similarly clear in animals: castrated cock chickens (capons) did not develop the typical male secondary sexual characteristics, namely aggression, crowing, muscle development, sexual proclivity and most visibly the cockscomb and wattle; they were docile and developed tender flesh, which was considered a delicacy.

On 8 February 1849, Berthold spoke at the Royal Scientific Society in Göttingen. He described how he'd taken six cock chickens and removed the testes from four of them. The two uncastrated birds continued to develop normally. The other birds remained without male characteristics. Crucially, however, Berthold reprised an experiment that he knew John Hunter had tried with unclear results before 1771 with hens. He transplanted testes back into the abdomens of two of the castrated birds but in a different location; the remasculated birds progressed to develop secondary sexual characteristics, indicating that the testes functioned effectively normally.

Upon autopsy, he found that the transplanted testes had grown a new vasculature but no other bodily connection: this finally demonstrated that whatever was controlling the secondary characteristics was transported from the testes via the bloodstream. The prevailing theory, that sexual characteristics were mediated via the nervous system, was thus disproved.

Despite this ground-breaking result, Berthold abandoned completely any further developmental work in this field and his contemporaries also showed little interest. The non-reductionist philosophy prevalent amongst physiologists at Göttingen might have coloured their thinking; Rudolph Wagner repeated the experiment without success, and perhaps this also had an effect. No major progress was made until five decades later with some dramatic successes in the treatment of thyroid-based illnesses by Victor Horsley and, soon after, his student George Murray.

== Legacy ==
Berthold is commemorated in the scientific name of a species of snake, Simoselaps bertholdi.
