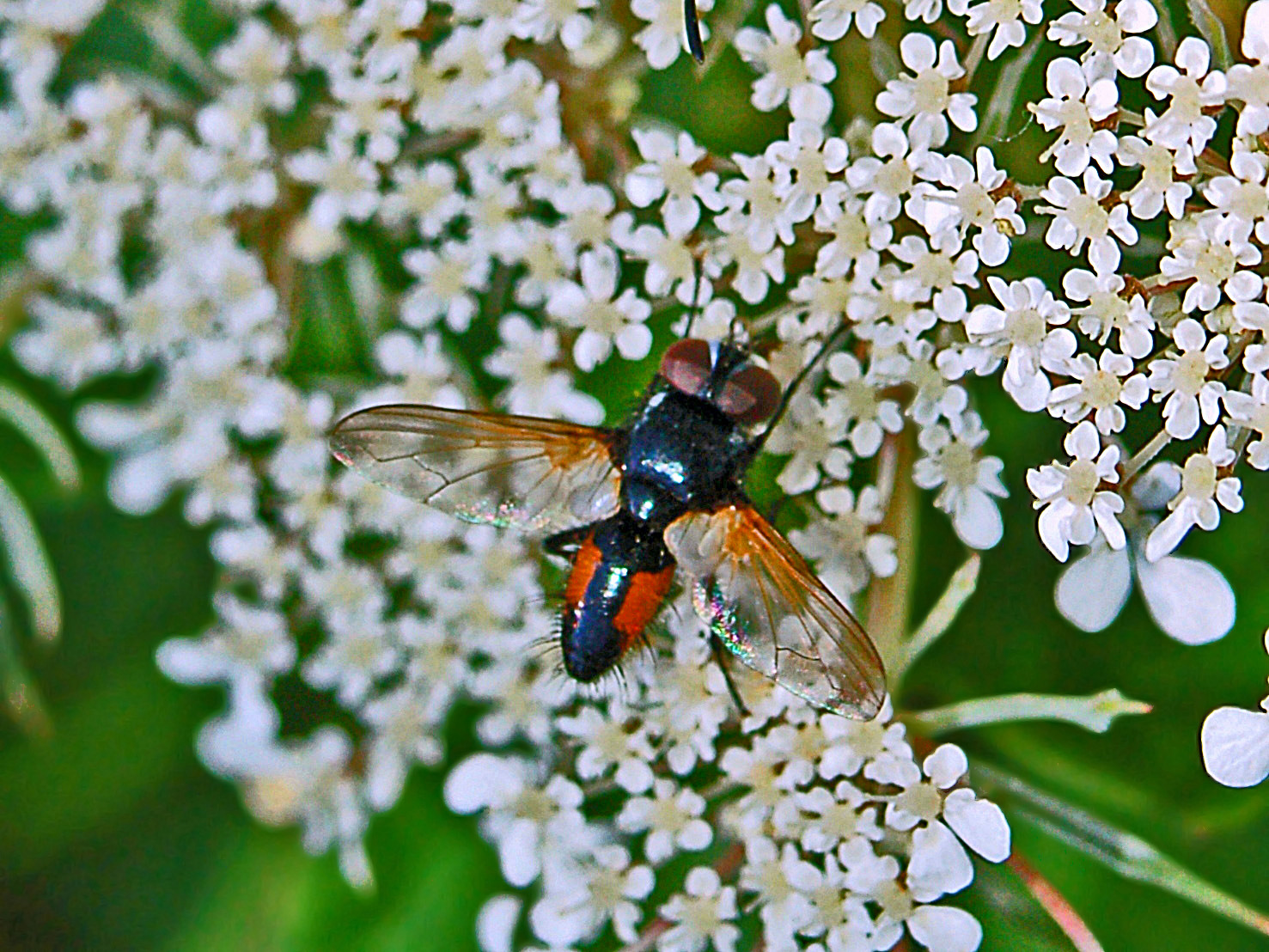
- Male of the C. biguttata species

Scientific classification
- Kingdom: Animalia
- Phylum: Arthropoda
- Clade: Pancrustacea
- Class: Insecta
- Order: Diptera
- Family: Tachinidae
- Subfamily: Phasiinae
- Tribe: Leucostomatini
- Genus: Clairvillia
- Species: C. biguttata

Binomial name
- Clairvillia biguttata (Meigen, 1824)

Synonyms
- Clairvillia dispar Rondani, 1856; Clairvillia flavipalpis Rondani, 1868; Clairvillia forcipata Robineau-Desvoidy, 1863; Clairvillia ocypterina Schiner, 1861; Ocyptera irregularis Loew, 1844; Phanemya musca Robineau-Desvoidy, 1830

= Clairvillia biguttata =

Species of fly

Clairvillia biguttata is a species of fly in the family Tachinidae.

== Description ==
Clairvillia biguttata can reach a length of 5.5–6.5 millimetres (0.22–0.26 in). The thorax is shining black. Also the abdomen is mainly black, but the first three tergites are reddish with a black longitudinal stripe. Males show erect hairs on the dorsal surface of abdominal tergites three and four. These flies are parasites of Coriomeris denticulatus (Coreidae).

== Distribution ==
This species can be found in Albania, Austria, Belgium, Bulgaria, Croatia, Czech Republic, France, Germany, Greece, Hungary, Italy, North Macedonia, Poland, Portugal, Romania, Russia, Spain, Switzerland.
