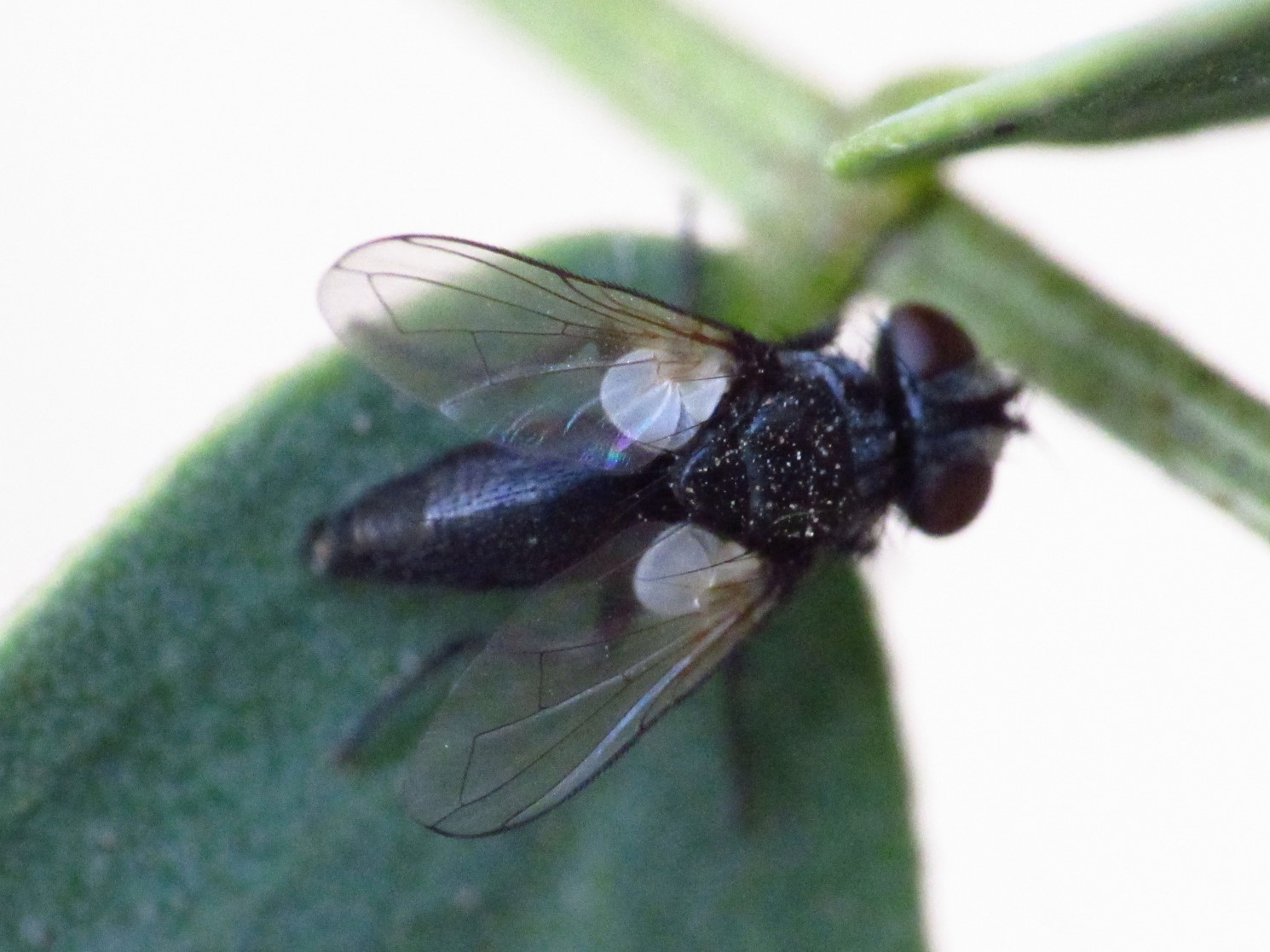

Scientific classification
- Kingdom: Animalia
- Phylum: Arthropoda
- Clade: Pancrustacea
- Class: Insecta
- Order: Diptera
- Family: Tachinidae
- Subfamily: Phasiinae
- Tribe: Leucostomatini
- Genus: Leucostoma
- Species: L. aterrimum

Binomial name
- Leucostoma aterrimum (Villers, 1789)

Synonyms
- Musca aterrima Villers, 1789

= Leucostoma aterrimum =

Species of fly

Leucostoma aterrimum is a European species of fly in the family Tachinidae.

== Distribution ==
Canada, United States (including Puerto Rico and Hawaii (immigrant)), Mexico, Argentina, Chile, Europe.
