= Labigastera forcipata =

Scientific classification
- Kingdom: Animalia
- Phylum: Arthropoda
- Clade: Pancrustacea
- Class: Insecta
- Order: Diptera
- Family: Tachinidae
- Subfamily: Phasiinae
- Tribe: Leucostomatini
- Genus: Labigastera
- Species: L. forcipata

Binomial name
- Labigastera forcipata (Meigen, 1824)

Synonyms
- Tachina forcipata Meigen, 1824; Clairvillia rondanii Pandellé, 1894; Labidogyne grandis Brauer & von Berganstamm, 1889; Labigastera grandis Brauer & von Berganstamm, 1889; Pyragrura uncinatus Rondani, 1861

Species of fly

Labigastera forcipata is a European species of fly in the family Tachinidae.

== Distribution ==
British Isles, Czech Republic, Hungary, Poland, Romania, Slovakia, Ukraine, Bulgaria, Corsica, Italy, Portugal, Serbia, Spain, Austria, Belgium, France, Germany, Netherlands, Switzerland, Russia.
