= Dionaea aurifrons =

Scientific classification
- Kingdom: Animalia
- Phylum: Arthropoda
- Clade: Pancrustacea
- Class: Insecta
- Order: Diptera
- Family: Tachinidae
- Subfamily: Phasiinae
- Tribe: Leucostomatini
- Genus: Dionaea
- Species: D. aurifrons

Binomial name
- Dionaea aurifrons (Meigen, 1824)

Synonyms
- Tachina aurifrons Meigen, 1824; Dionaea aurulans Robineau-Desvoidy, 1830; Dionaea forcipata Robineau-Desvoidy, 1830; Dionaea lineata Robineau-Desvoidy, 1863; Dionaea binotata Robineau-Desvoidy, 1863

Species of fly

Dionaea aurifrons is a European species of fly in the family Tachinidae.

== Distribution ==
British Isles, Czech Republic, Hungary, Poland, Romania, Slovakia, Ukraine, Bulgaria, Croatia, Greece, Italy, Malta, Portugal, Serbia, Spain, Austria, Belgium, France, Germany, Switzerland, Japan, Iran, Israel, Palestine, Russia, Transcaucasia.
