= Calyptromyia barbata =

Scientific classification
- Kingdom: Animalia
- Phylum: Arthropoda
- Clade: Pancrustacea
- Class: Insecta
- Order: Diptera
- Family: Tachinidae
- Subfamily: Phasiinae
- Tribe: Leucostomatini
- Genus: Calyptromyia
- Species: C. barbata

Binomial name
- Calyptromyia barbata Villeneuve, 1915

Synonyms
- Calyptromyia regina Mesnil & Pschorn-Walcher, 1968

Species of fly

Calyptromyia barbata is a species of fly in the family Tachinidae.

== Distribution ==
China, Taiwan, North Vietnam & Japan, North Korea, South Korea, Russia.
