= Clairvillia nitoris =

Scientific classification
- Kingdom: Animalia
- Phylum: Arthropoda
- Class: Insecta
- Order: Diptera
- Family: Tachinidae
- Subfamily: Phasiinae
- Tribe: Leucostomatini
- Genus: Clairvillia
- Species: C. nitoris

Binomial name
- Clairvillia nitoris (Coquillett, 1898)

Synonyms
- Dionaea nitoris Coquillett, 1898

Species of fly

Clairvillia nitoris is a species of bristle fly in the family Tachinidae.

== Distribution ==
Canada, United States.
