= Leucostoma dapsile =

Scientific classification
- Kingdom: Animalia
- Phylum: Arthropoda
- Clade: Pancrustacea
- Class: Insecta
- Order: Diptera
- Family: Tachinidae
- Subfamily: Phasiinae
- Tribe: Leucostomatini
- Genus: Leucostoma
- Species: L. dapsile

Binomial name
- Leucostoma dapsile (Reinhard, 1956)

Synonyms
- Calyptrosomus dapsilis Reinhard, 1956

Species of fly

Leucostoma dapsile is a European species of fly in the family Tachinidae.

== Distribution ==
United States.
