= Leucostoma gravipes =

Scientific classification
- Kingdom: Animalia
- Phylum: Arthropoda
- Clade: Pancrustacea
- Class: Insecta
- Order: Diptera
- Family: Tachinidae
- Subfamily: Phasiinae
- Tribe: Leucostomatini
- Genus: Leucostoma
- Species: L. gravipes

Binomial name
- Leucostoma gravipes Wulp, 1890

Synonyms
- Phyto nigricornis Townsend, 1892; Phyto senilis Townsend, 1892

Species of fly

Leucostoma gravipes is a North American species of fly in the family Tachinidae.

== Distribution ==
Mexico, Canada, United States, Jamaica.
