= Cinochira mitis =

Scientific classification
- Kingdom: Animalia
- Phylum: Arthropoda
- Clade: Pancrustacea
- Class: Insecta
- Order: Diptera
- Family: Tachinidae
- Subfamily: Phasiinae
- Tribe: Leucostomatini
- Genus: Cinochira
- Species: C. mitis

Binomial name
- Cinochira mitis Reinhard, 1957

Synonyms
- Baromyia mitis Reinhard, 1957

Species of fly

Cinochira mitis is a species of fly in the family Tachinidae.

== Distribution ==
United States.
