= Leucostoma politifrons =

Scientific classification
- Kingdom: Animalia
- Phylum: Arthropoda
- Clade: Pancrustacea
- Class: Insecta
- Order: Diptera
- Family: Tachinidae
- Subfamily: Phasiinae
- Tribe: Leucostomatini
- Genus: Leucostoma
- Species: L. politifrons

Binomial name
- Leucostoma politifrons Reinhard, 1975

Species of fly

Leucostoma politifrons is a North American species of fly in the family Tachinidae.

== Distribution ==
United States.
