= Clairvillia timberlakei =

Scientific classification
- Kingdom: Animalia
- Phylum: Arthropoda
- Class: Insecta
- Order: Diptera
- Family: Tachinidae
- Subfamily: Phasiinae
- Tribe: Leucostomatini
- Genus: Clairvillia
- Species: C. timberlakei

Binomial name
- Clairvillia timberlakei (Walton, 1914)

Synonyms
- Dionea timberlakei Walton, 1914

Species of fly

Clairvillia timberlakei is a species of bristle fly in the family Tachinidae.

== Distribution ==
Canada, United States.
