= Dionaea flavisquamis =

Scientific classification
- Kingdom: Animalia
- Phylum: Arthropoda
- Clade: Pancrustacea
- Class: Insecta
- Order: Diptera
- Family: Tachinidae
- Subfamily: Phasiinae
- Tribe: Leucostomatini
- Genus: Dionaea
- Species: D. flavisquamis

Binomial name
- Dionaea flavisquamis Robineau-Desvoidy, 1863

Synonyms
- Dionaea aurlans Dupuis, 1973

Species of fly

Dionaea flavisquamis is a European and Asian species of fly in the family Tachinidae.

== Distribution ==
Albania, Spain, Belgium, France, Germany, Switzerland, Kazakhstan, North Korea, South Korea.
