= Labigastera nitidula =

Scientific classification
- Kingdom: Animalia
- Phylum: Arthropoda
- Clade: Pancrustacea
- Class: Insecta
- Order: Diptera
- Family: Tachinidae
- Subfamily: Phasiinae
- Tribe: Leucostomatini
- Genus: Labigastera
- Species: L. nitidula

Binomial name
- Labigastera nitidula (Meigen, 1824)

Synonyms
- Tachina nitidula Meigen, 1824; Labidigaster algira Macquart, 1844

Species of fly

Labigastera nitidula is a European and North African species of fly in the family Tachinidae.

== Distribution ==
Turkmenistan, Czech Republic, Sweden, Bulgaria, Croatia, Greece, Italy, Portugal, Spain, Turkey, Austria, France, Switzerland, Israel, Algeria.
