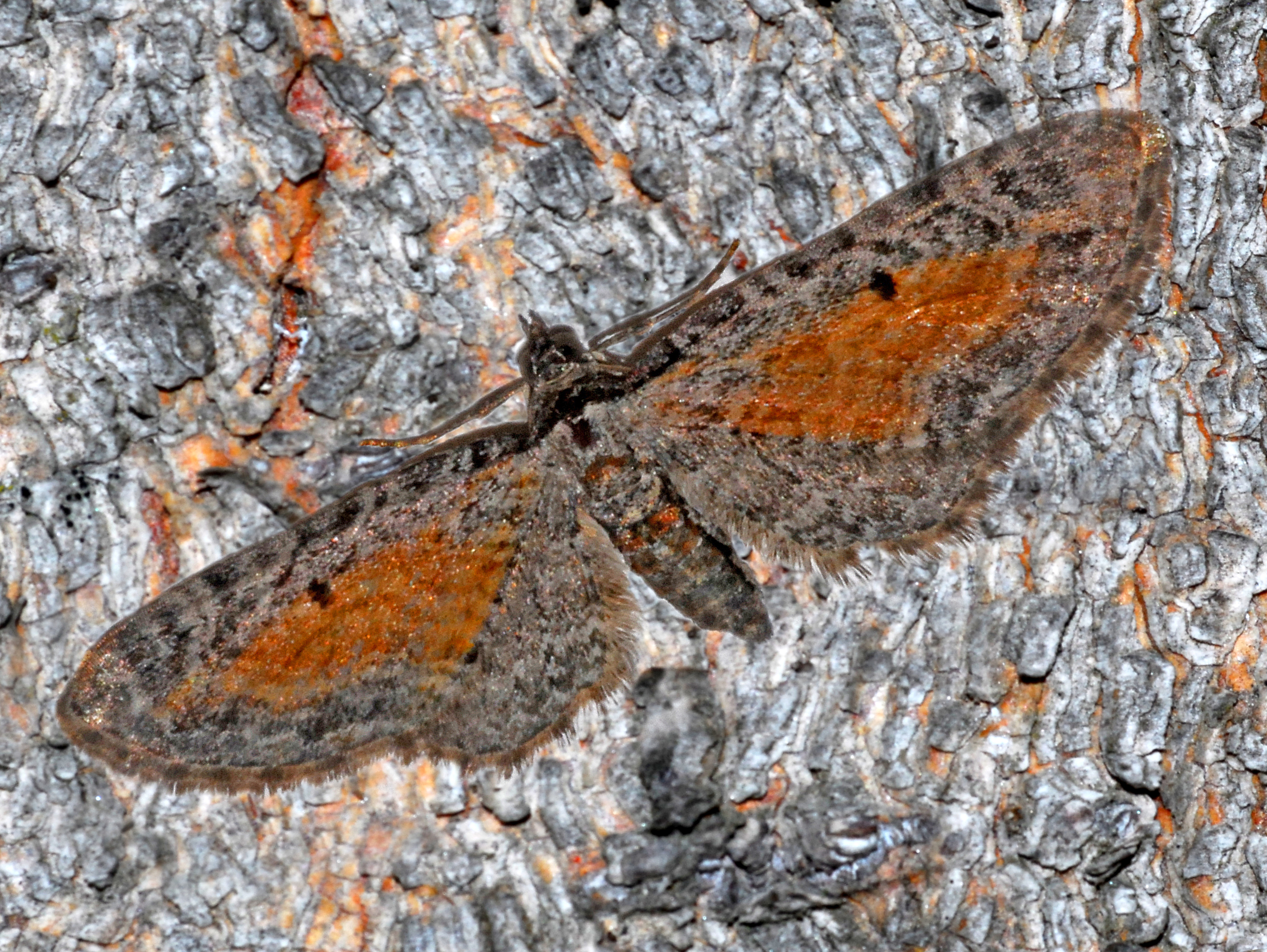
- Adult of Eupithecia icterata f. Subfulvata
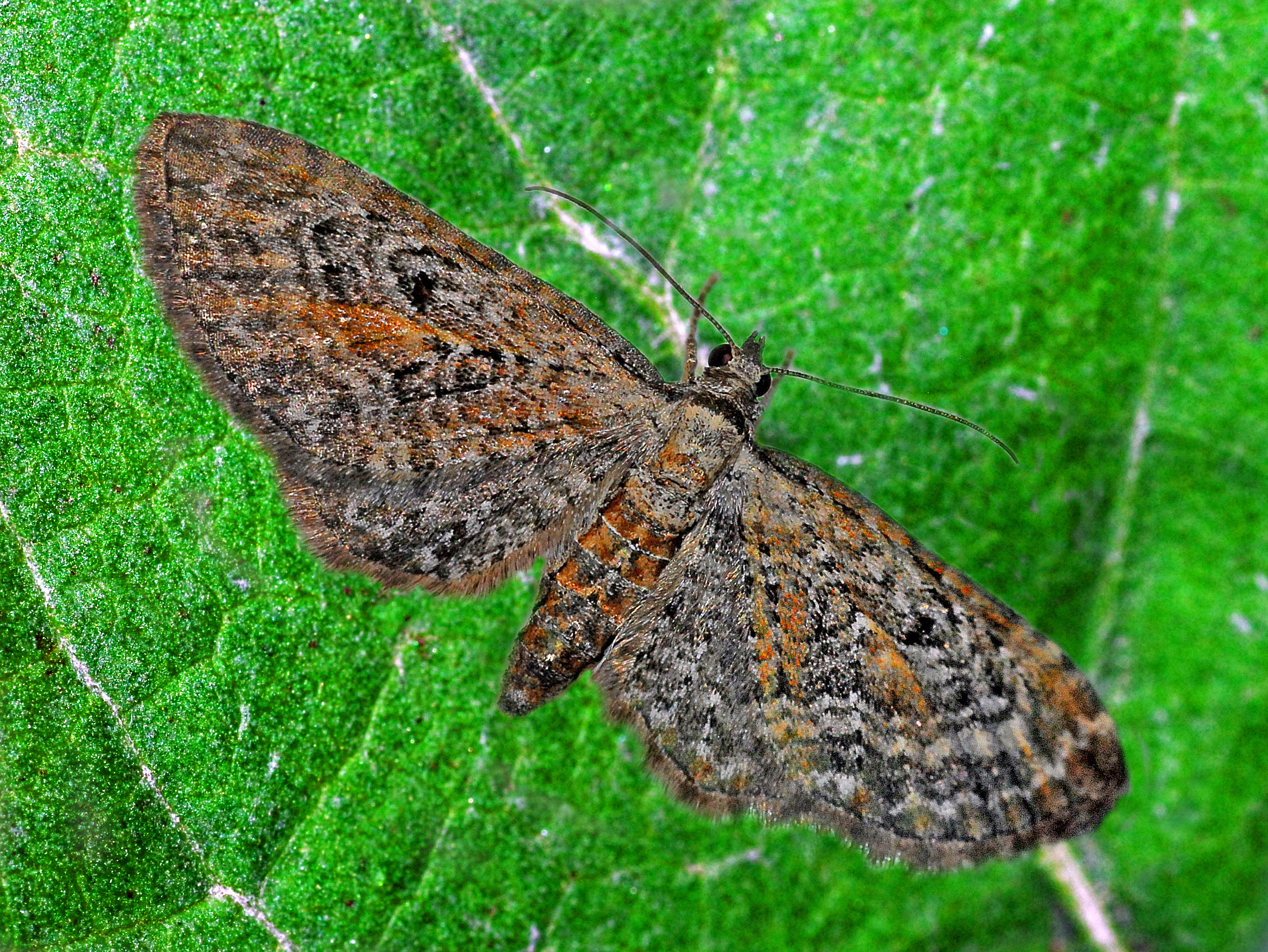
- Eupithecia icterata f. Cognata

Scientific classification
- Kingdom: Animalia
- Phylum: Arthropoda
- Class: Insecta
- Order: Lepidoptera
- Family: Geometridae
- Genus: Eupithecia
- Species: E. icterata

Binomial name
- Eupithecia icterata (de Villers, 1789)

Synonyms
- List: Phalaena icterata Villers, 1789; Eupithecia cognata Stephens, 1831; Eupithecia ferruginata Duponchel, 1842; Eupithecia ligusticata Dietze, 1910; Larentia ligustigata Donzel, 1838; Larentia oxydata Treitschke, 1828; Phalaena subfulvata Haworth, 1809

= Tawny speckled pug =

Species of moth

The tawny speckled pug (Eupithecia icterata) is a moth of the family Geometridae.

== Subspecies and varietas ==
- Eupithecia icterata icterata (Villers, 1789)
- Eupithecia icterata iranata Schutze, 1960 (Iran)
- Eupithecia icterata f. Subfulvata (Haworth, 1809)
- Eupithecia icterata f. Cognata Stephens, 1831

== Distribution ==
This species can be found throughout the Palearctic region, the Near East and North Africa. It occurs in large parts of Europe, but is absent in Portugal, in the northernmost part of Scandinavia, as well as on Iceland and some Mediterranean islands. In the Sierra Nevada it rises to an altitude of 3000 meters. In Asia it can be found in Turkey, the Caucasus, Iran, Kazakhstan and Western Siberia as far as the Altai Mountains. There is also an occurrence in the Atlas Mountains in North Africa.

== Habitat ==
These moths prefer dry mountain meadows, forest edges and parks. It may be present ion areas with host plants on the edges of roads, fields, and bushes, semi-arid grasslands and loosely standing shrubbery and perennial herb fields with warm microclimate.

== Description ==
Eupithecia icterata can reach a wingspan of 20–24 mm. It is among the larger species in the genus. Unlike many pugs these moths are distinctively marked. They come in two color variants. In f. Subfulvata, the basic color of the forewings is light gray to lead gray and shows a two-tone large clear tawny-orange triangular panel from the rear edge upwards, which does not, however, reach the front edge. A black spot stands out in the middle. The f. Cognata lacks this large field. In this variant the reddish area is a more variegated or indistinctly marbled, mixed with gray tones or the reddish area is completely absent. Some light, black-lined wavy lines stand out slightly.

The hindwings of both forms are grayish brown, slightly lighter than the forewings and show a small black central spot. Moreover this species is rather similar to other species belonging to the genus Eupithecia. For example Eupithecia icterata f. Cognata is very similar to Eupithecia millefoliata, but the last is usually paler in color and shows a smaller central spot on the forewings.

The egg initially has a whitish color and later takes on yellowish tints. It has an oval shape and shows depressions in the shell sculpture that are bordered with strips. The adult larvae are slender and purple-gray to brown in color, with a dark diamond-shaped drawing on the back and a pale whitish line down each side.

== Biology ==
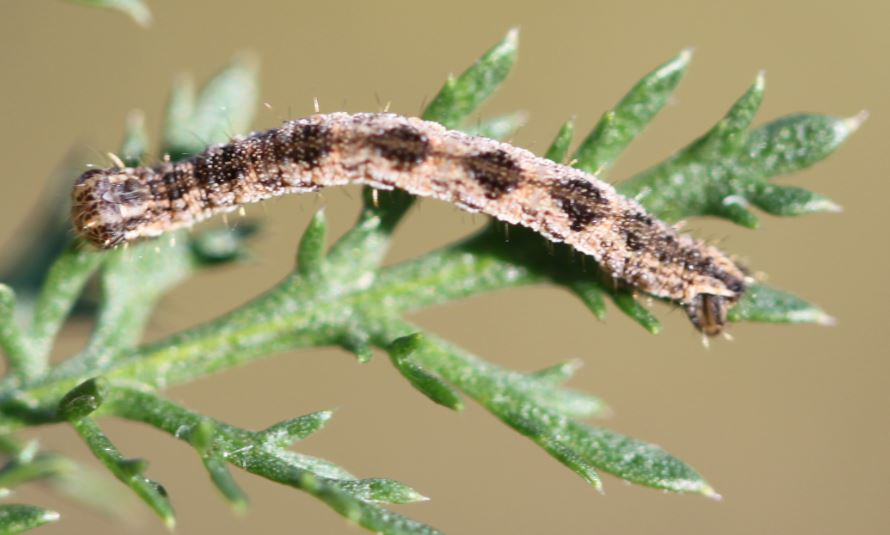
Caterpillar

Eupithecia icterata is usually a single-brooded species (univoltine species. It flies at night from June to September, is attracted to artificial light sources and occasionally it suckles on some flowers, for example on Eupatorium species. The caterpillars live in September and October. They usually feed on the leaves and flowers of yarrow and has also been recorded on Artemisia (Artemisia absinthium, Artemisia vulgaris, Artemisia campestris), Achillea ptarmica and tansy. The species overwinters as a pupa in a thin spin on the ground.

== Bibliography ==
- This article has been expanded using, inter alia, material based on a translation of an article from German Wikipedia, by the same name.
- Antonova E.M. & L.V. Bolshakov - Geometrid Moths (Lepidoptera) of Tula Region. in Actias 2 (1-2): 13-32. 1995
- Chinery, Michael Collins Guide to the Insects of Britain and Western Europe 1986 (Reprinted 1991)
- de Villers, C. (1789): Caroli Linnaei entomologia, faunae suecicae descriptionibus aucta; DD. Scopoli, Geoffroy, de Geer, Fabricii, Schrank, &c. speciebus vel in Systemate non enumeratis, vel nuperrime detectis, vel speciebus Galliae Australis locupleta, generum specierumque rariorum iconibus ornata. Tomus secundus. iii-xvi + 1-656 + 6 pl. Paris (Piestre et Delamilliere).
- Kostjuk, I.Yu in Efetov, K.A. & Yu.I.Budashkin - Geometridae. In: Baboshki Krima - The Lepidoptera of Crimea. in Simferopol, 111 pp.: 86-92. 1990
- Mironov, V. - The Geometrid Moths of Europe, vol. 4 (Larentiinae: Perizomini & Eupitheciini). in Apollo Books, Stenstrup, 464 pp. & 16 color pls. 2003
- Mironov, V. - The Geometrid Moths of Europe, vol. 4 (Larentiinae: Perizomini & Eupitheciini). in Apollo Books, Stenstrup, 464 pp. & 16 color pls. 2003
