= Leucostoma (fly) =

Scientific classification
- Kingdom: Animalia
- Phylum: Arthropoda
- Class: Insecta
- Order: Diptera
- Family: Tachinidae
- Subfamily: Phasiinae
- Tribe: Leucostomatini
- Genus: Leucostoma; Meigen, 1803

Type species
- Ocyptera simplex Fallén, 1820

Synonyms
- Calyptrosomus Reinhard, 1956; Clebia Gobert, 1887; Clelia Robineau-Desvoidy, 1830; Cloelia Agassiz, 1846; Cyclodionaea Townsend, 1915; Leucostomyia Jacentkovský, 1938; Neopsalida Townsend, 1916; Paradionaea Townsend, 1916; Parapsalida Townsend, 1916; Psalida Rondani, 1856; Pseudoleucostoma Jacentkovský, 1938; Siphopsalida Townsend, 1915

Genus of flies

Leucostoma is a genus of flies in the family Tachinidae.

== Species ==
- Leucostoma abbreviatum Herting, 1971
- Leucostoma acirostre Reinhard, 1956
- Leucostoma africanum Villeneuve, 1920
- Leucostoma anthracinum (Meigen, 1824)
- Leucostoma aterrimum (Villers, 1789)
- Leucostoma brasilianum (Townsend, 1938)
- Leucostoma crassum Kugler, 1966
- Leucostoma dapsile (Reinhard, 1956)
- Leucostoma edentatum Kugler, 1978
- Leucostoma effrenatum Reinhard, 1956
- Leucostoma engeddense Kugler, 1966
- Leucostoma fallax Reinhard, 1975
- Leucostoma gravipes Wulp, 1890
- Leucostoma meridianum (Rondani, 1868)
- Leucostoma meridionale (Townsend, 1915)
- Leucostoma neomexicanum Townsend, 1892
- Leucostoma nigricorpuris Mawlood, 2002
- Leucostoma nimirum Reinhard, 1956
- Leucostoma nudifacies Tschorsnig, 1991
- Leucostoma obsidianum (Wiedemann, 1830)
- Leucostoma peccator Reinhard, 1956
- Leucostoma perrarum Reinhard, 1956
- Leucostoma peruvianum Townsend, 1928
- Leucostoma politifrons Reinhard, 1975
- Leucostoma semibarbatum Tschorsnig, 1991
- Leucostoma simplex (Fallén, 1820)
- Leucostoma tetrapterum (Meigen, 1824)
- Leucostoma turonicum Dupuis, 1964
- Leucostoma vapulare Reinhard, 1956
- Leucostoma vegetum Reinhard, 1956
