= Dionaea =

Dionaea is the generic name of two groups of organisms. It can refer to:

- Dionaea (fly), a genus of flies in the family Tachinidae
- Dionaea (plant), a monotypic genus of carnivorous plants in the family Droseraceae
