= Leucostoma engeddense =

Scientific classification
- Kingdom: Animalia
- Phylum: Arthropoda
- Clade: Pancrustacea
- Class: Insecta
- Order: Diptera
- Family: Tachinidae
- Subfamily: Phasiinae
- Tribe: Leucostomatini
- Genus: Leucostoma
- Species: L. engeddense

Binomial name
- Leucostoma engeddense Kugler, 1966

Species of fly

Leucostoma engeddense is an Asian species of fly in the family Tachinidae.

== Distribution ==
Bulgaria, Cyprus, Greece, Malta, Portugal, Spain, Turkey, Iran, Israel, Algeria, Canary Islands, Egypt, South Africa, United Arab Emirates.
