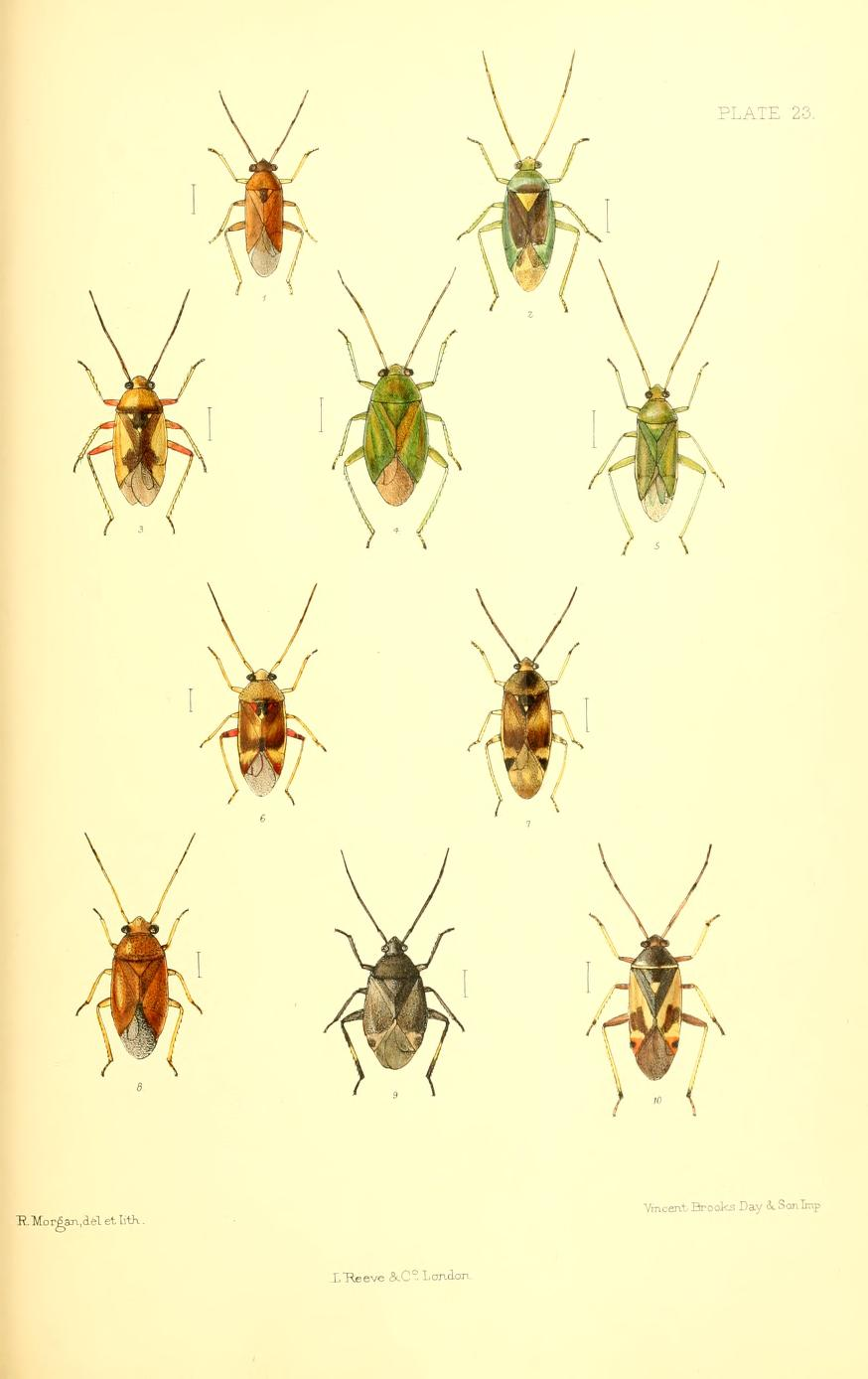
- Camptozygum aequale in Saunders Hemiptera Heteroptera of the British Islands (figure8)

Scientific classification
- Kingdom: Animalia
- Phylum: Arthropoda
- Class: Insecta
- Order: Hemiptera
- Suborder: Heteroptera
- Family: Miridae
- Genus: Camptozygum
- Species: C. aequale

Binomial name
- Camptozygum aequale (Villers, 1789)

Synonyms
- Camptozygum pinastri (Fallén, 1807); Lygaeus pinastri Fallén, 1807

= Camptozygum aequale =

Species of true bug

Camptozygum aequale is a species of plant bug in the family Miridae. It is found in Europe and across the Palearctic (excluding China?) and North America. C. aequale is associated with Pinus sylvestris.
