= Leucostoma edentatum =

Scientific classification
- Kingdom: Animalia
- Phylum: Arthropoda
- Clade: Pancrustacea
- Class: Insecta
- Order: Diptera
- Family: Tachinidae
- Subfamily: Phasiinae
- Tribe: Leucostomatini
- Genus: Leucostoma
- Species: L. edentatum

Binomial name
- Leucostoma edentatum Kugler, 1978

Species of fly

Leucostoma edentatum is an Asian species of fly in the family Tachinidae.

== Distribution ==
Croatia, Italy, and Israel.
