= Leucostoma abbreviatum =

Scientific classification
- Kingdom: Animalia
- Phylum: Arthropoda
- Clade: Pancrustacea
- Class: Insecta
- Order: Diptera
- Family: Tachinidae
- Subfamily: Phasiinae
- Tribe: Leucostomatini
- Genus: Leucostoma
- Species: L. abbreviatum

Binomial name
- Leucostoma abbreviatum Herting, 1971

Species of fly

Leucostoma abbreviatum is a European species of fly in the family Tachinidae.

== Distribution ==
Turkmenistan, Hungary, Bulgaria, Greece, Italy, Spain, Turkey, Austria, France, Germany, Iran, Israel, Morocco.
