= Leucostoma perrarum =

Scientific classification
- Kingdom: Animalia
- Phylum: Arthropoda
- Clade: Pancrustacea
- Class: Insecta
- Order: Diptera
- Family: Tachinidae
- Subfamily: Phasiinae
- Tribe: Leucostomatini
- Genus: Leucostoma
- Species: L. perrarum

Binomial name
- Leucostoma perrarum Reinhard, 1956

Species of fly

Leucostoma perrarum is a European species of fly in the family Tachinidae.

== Distribution ==
United States.
