= Leucostoma simplex =

Scientific classification
- Kingdom: Animalia
- Phylum: Arthropoda
- Clade: Pancrustacea
- Class: Insecta
- Order: Diptera
- Family: Tachinidae
- Subfamily: Phasiinae
- Tribe: Leucostomatini
- Genus: Leucostoma
- Species: L. simplex

Binomial name
- Leucostoma simplex (Fallén, 1815)

Synonyms
- Clelia minor Robineau-Desvoidy, 1830; Clelia rapida Robineau-Desvoidy, 1830; Cyclodionaea acuminata Townsend, 1915; Leucostoma atra Townsend, 1891; Ocyptera simplex Fallén, 1820

Species of fly

Leucostoma simplex is a European species of fly in the family Tachinidae.

== Distribution ==
Canada, United States, Argentina, Chile, Uzbekistan, China, British Isles, Czech Republic, Hungary, Moldova, Poland, Romania, Slovakia, Ukraine, Denmark, Finland, Sweden, Andorra, Bosnia & Herzegovina, Bulgaria, Corsica, Croatia, Greece, Italy, Macedonia, Portugal, Serbia, Slovenia, Spain, Turkey, Austria, Belgium, France, Germany, Netherlands, Switzerland, Kazakhstan, Iran, Mongolia, Russia, Transcaucasia, Cape Verde, Sierra Leone, Australia. Recorded from Hawaii as an immigrant.
