= Calyptromyia stupenda =

Scientific classification
- Kingdom: Animalia
- Phylum: Arthropoda
- Clade: Pancrustacea
- Class: Insecta
- Order: Diptera
- Family: Tachinidae
- Subfamily: Phasiinae
- Tribe: Leucostomatini
- Genus: Calyptromyia
- Species: C. stupenda

Binomial name
- Calyptromyia stupenda Dear, 1981

Species of fly

Calyptromyia stupenda is a species of fly in the family Tachinidae.

== Distribution ==
Madagascar.
