= Cinochira atra =

Scientific classification
- Kingdom: Animalia
- Phylum: Arthropoda
- Clade: Pancrustacea
- Class: Insecta
- Order: Diptera
- Family: Tachinidae
- Subfamily: Phasiinae
- Tribe: Leucostomatini
- Genus: Cinochira
- Species: C. atra

Binomial name
- Cinochira atra Zetterstedt, 1845

Synonyms
- Anthomyza pinguicula Zetterstedt, 1846

Species of fly

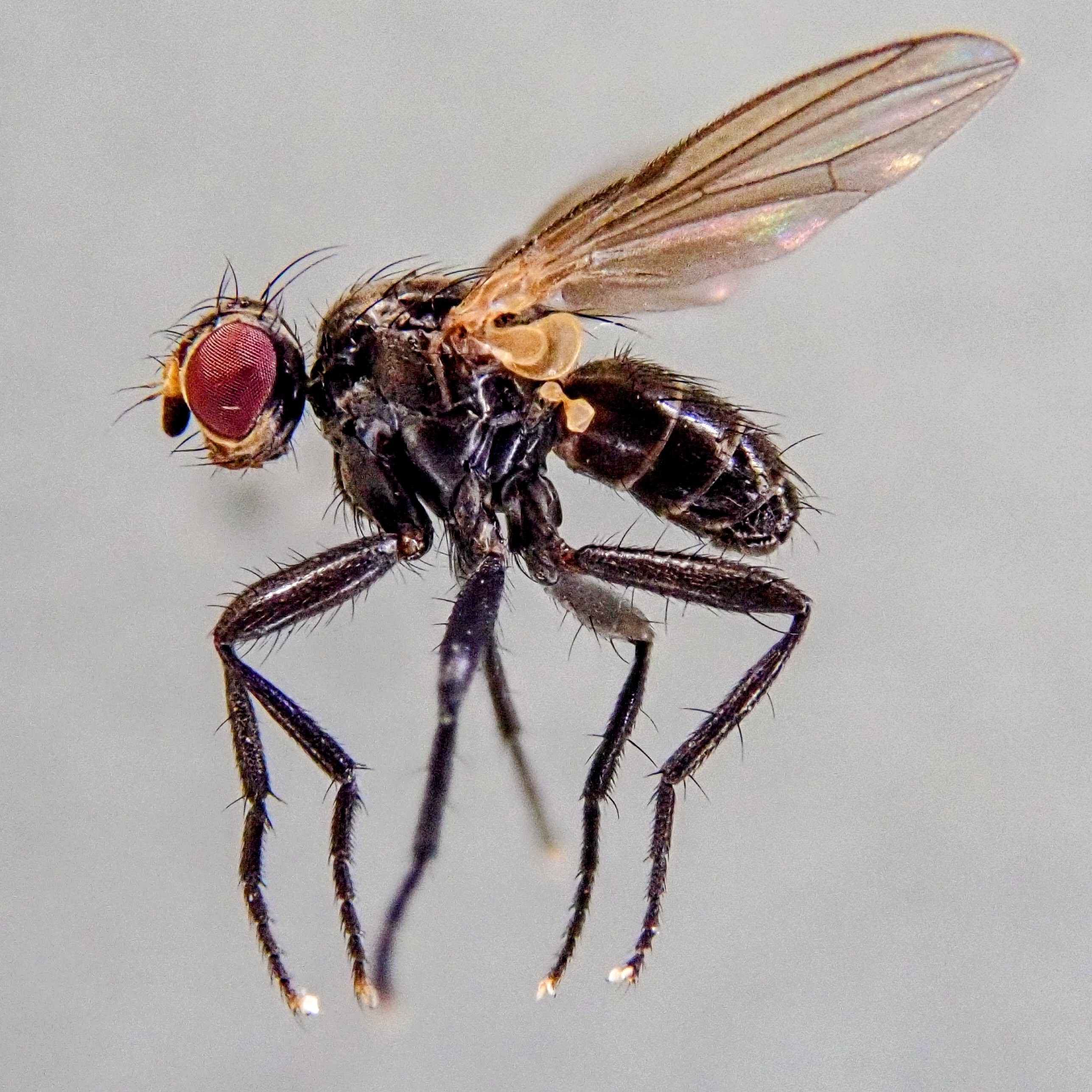
Cinochira atra, Wildlife Garden Natural History Museum, London

Cinochira atra is a species of fly in the family Tachinidae.

== Distribution ==
British Isles, Czech Republic, Hungary, Lithuania, Poland, Romania, Slovakia, Denmark, Norway, Sweden, Italy, Portugal, Austria, France, Germany, Netherlands, Switzerland, Russia.
