= Pradocania =

Scientific classification
- Kingdom: Animalia
- Phylum: Arthropoda
- Class: Insecta
- Order: Diptera
- Family: Tachinidae
- Subfamily: Phasiinae
- Tribe: Leucostomatini
- Genus: Pradocania; Tschorsnig, 1997

Type species
- Pradocania costata Tschorsnig, 1997

Genus of flies

Pradocania is a genus of flies in the family Tachinidae.

== Species ==
- Pradocania costata Tschorsnig, 1997

== Distribution ==
Spain.
