= Clelimyia =

Scientific classification
- Kingdom: Animalia
- Phylum: Arthropoda
- Class: Insecta
- Order: Diptera
- Family: Tachinidae
- Subfamily: Phasiinae
- Tribe: Leucostomatini
- Genus: Clelimyia; Herting, 1981

Type species
- Clelimyia paradoxa Herting, 1981

Genus of flies

Clelimyia is a genus of flies in the family Tachinidae.

== Species ==
- Clelimyia paradoxa Herting, 1981

== Distribution ==
Japan, North Korea, South Korea, Russia, China.
