= Brullaea =

Scientific classification
- Kingdom: Animalia
- Phylum: Arthropoda
- Class: Insecta
- Order: Diptera
- Family: Tachinidae
- Subfamily: Phasiinae
- Tribe: Leucostomatini
- Genus: Brullaea; Robineau-Desvoidy, 1863

Type species
- Brullaea ocypteroidea Robineau-Desvoidy, 1863

Genus of flies

Brullaea is a genus of flies in the family Tachinidae.

== Species ==
- Brullaea ocypteroidea Robineau-Desvoidy, 1863

== Distribution ==
Czech Republic, Hungary, Poland, Romania, Slovakia, Ukraine, Italy, Austria, Belgium, France, Germany, Netherlands, Russia.
