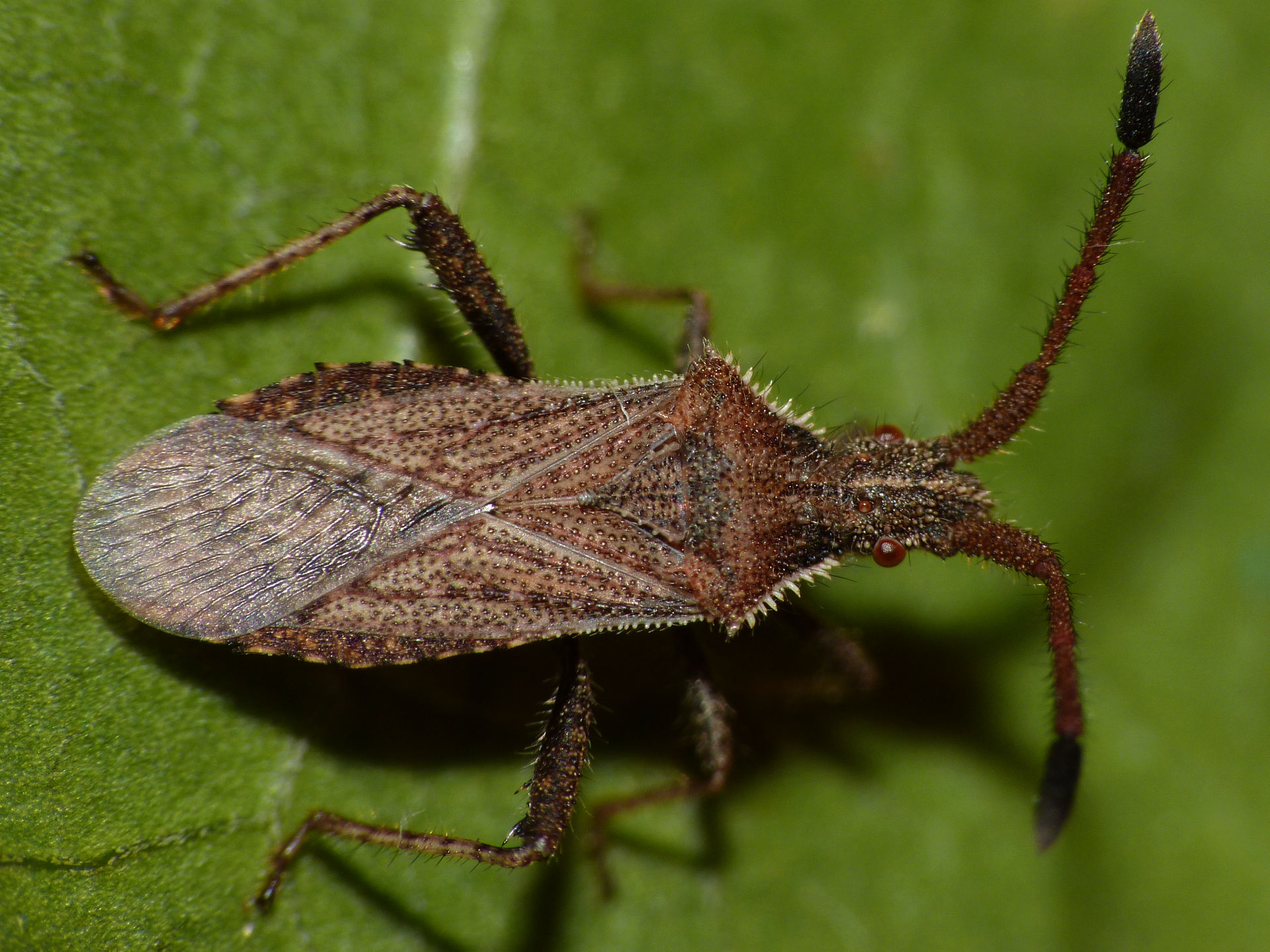
- Coriomeris denticulatus

Scientific classification
- Domain: Eukaryota
- Kingdom: Animalia
- Phylum: Arthropoda
- Class: Insecta
- Order: Hemiptera
- Suborder: Heteroptera
- Family: Coreidae
- Subfamily: Pseudophloeinae
- Tribe: Pseudophloeini
- Genus: Coriomeris; Westwood, 1842

= Coriomeris =

Genus of true bugs

Coriomeris is a genus of leaf-footed bugs in the family Coreidae. There are about 19 described species in Coriomeris.

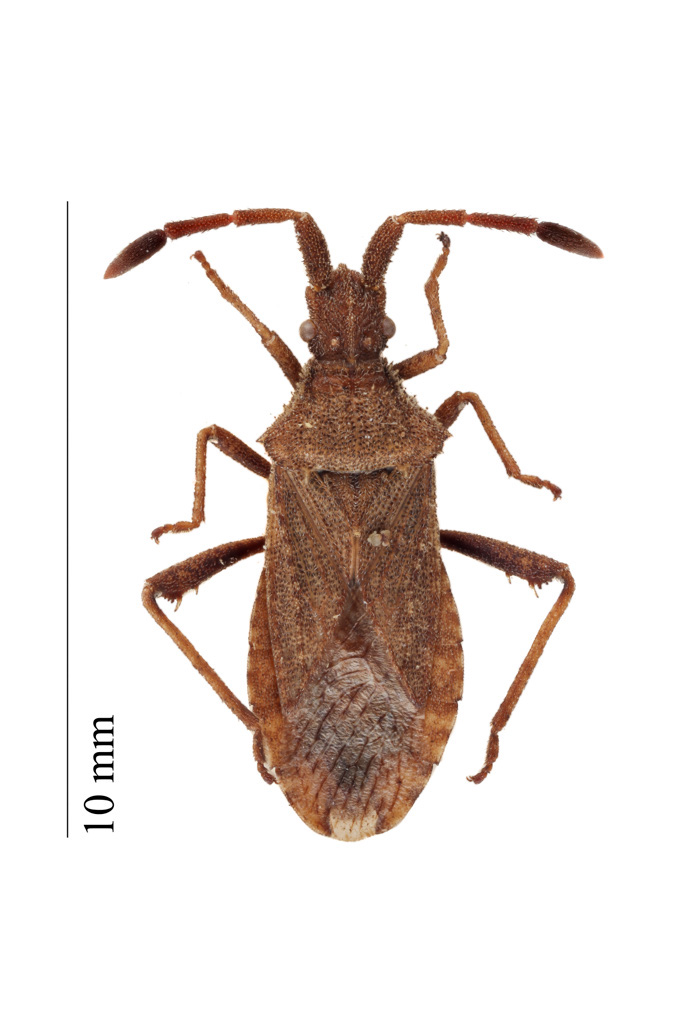
Coriomeris scabricornis

== Species ==
These 19 species belong to the genus Coriomeris:

- Coriomeris affinis (Herrich-Schäffer, 1839)
- Coriomeris alpinus (Horváth, 1895)
- Coriomeris apricus Kiritshenko, 1952
- Coriomeris armeniacus Tshernova, 1978
- Coriomeris bergevini Poppius, 1912
- Coriomeris brevicornis Lindberg, 1923
- Coriomeris denticulatus (Scopoli, 1763)
- Coriomeris echinatus Putshkov, 1968
- Coriomeris hirticornis (Fabricius, 1794)
- Coriomeris humilis (Uhler, 1872)
- Coriomeris insularis Dolling & Yonke, 1976
- Coriomeris integerrimus Jakovlev, 1904
- Coriomeris nigricornis (Stål, 1870)
- Coriomeris occidentalis Dolling & Yonke, 1976
- Coriomeris pallidus Reuter, 1900
- Coriomeris scabricornis (Panzer, 1805)
- Coriomeris subglaber Horváth, 1917
- Coriomeris validicornis Jakovlev, 1904
- Coriomeris vitticollis Reuter, 1900
