= Leucostoma anthracinum =

Scientific classification
- Kingdom: Animalia
- Phylum: Arthropoda
- Clade: Pancrustacea
- Class: Insecta
- Order: Diptera
- Family: Tachinidae
- Genus: Leucostoma
- Species: L. anthracinum

Binomial name
- Leucostoma anthracinum (Meigen, 1824)

Synonyms
- Tachina anthracinum Meigen, 1824; Leucostoma vimmeri Jacentkovsky, 1938

Species of fly

Leucostoma anthracinum is a species of fly in the family Tachinidae, found in Europe.

== Distribution ==
British Isles, Czech Republic, Hungary, Latvia, Poland, Romania, Slovakia, Ukraine, Sweden, Albania, Andorra, Bulgaria, Croatia, Greece, Italy, Malta, Portugal, Spain, Turkey, Austria, Belgium, France, Germany, Switzerland, Iran, Mongolia, Russia, Armenia.
