= Psalidoxena =

Scientific classification
- Kingdom: Animalia
- Phylum: Arthropoda
- Class: Insecta
- Order: Diptera
- Family: Tachinidae
- Subfamily: Phasiinae
- Tribe: Leucostomatini
- Genus: Psalidoxena; Villeneuve, 1941

Type species
- Dionaea transsylvanica Villeneuve, 1929

Genus of flies

Psalidoxena is a genus of flies in the family Tachinidae.

== Species ==
- Psalidoxena transsylvanica (Villeneuve, 1929)

== Distribution ==
Hungary, Romania, Italy, Portugal, Turkey, France.
