= Clairvilliops =

Scientific classification
- Kingdom: Animalia
- Phylum: Arthropoda
- Class: Insecta
- Order: Diptera
- Family: Tachinidae
- Subfamily: Phasiinae
- Tribe: Leucostomatini
- Genus: Clairvilliops; Mesnil, 1959

Type species
- Dionaea (Clairvilliops) inermis Mesnil, 1959

Synonyms
- Paradionaea Baranov in Hennig, 1941

Genus of flies

Clairvilliops is a genus of flies in the family Tachinidae.

== Species ==
- Clairvilliops breviforceps (Emden, 1954)

== Distribution ==
Japan, D.R. Congo, Tanzania. Malaysia, Taiwan.
