= Weberia =

Scientific classification
- Kingdom: Animalia
- Phylum: Arthropoda
- Class: Insecta
- Order: Diptera
- Family: Tachinidae
- Subfamily: Phasiinae
- Tribe: Leucostomatini
- Genus: Weberia; Robineau-Desvoidy, 1830

Type species
- Weberia appendiculata Robineau-Desvoidy, 1830

Synonyms
- Lepidosyntoma Becker, 1908

Genus of flies

Weberia is a genus of flies in the family Tachinidae.

== Species ==
- Weberia digramma (Meigen, 1824)

== Distribution ==
Turkmenistan, Czech Republic, Bulgaria, Corsica, Greece, Italy, Malta, Portugal, Spain, Turkey, France, Netherlands, Switzerland, Iran, Israel, Canary Islands, Azerbaijan.
