= Oblitoneura =

Scientific classification
- Kingdom: Animalia
- Phylum: Arthropoda
- Class: Insecta
- Order: Diptera
- Family: Tachinidae
- Subfamily: Phasiinae
- Tribe: Leucostomatini
- Genus: Oblitoneura; Mesnil, 1975

Type species
- Oblitoneura agromyzina Mesnil, 1975

Genus of flies

Oblitoneura is a genus of flies in the family Tachinidae.

== Species ==
- Oblitoneura agromyzina Mesnil, 1975

== Distribution ==
Israel.
