= Eulabidogaster =

Eulabidogaster setifacies

Scientific classification
- Kingdom: Animalia
- Phylum: Arthropoda
- Clade: Pancrustacea
- Class: Insecta
- Order: Diptera
- Family: Tachinidae
- Subfamily: Phasiinae
- Tribe: Leucostomatini
- Genus: Eulabidogaster; Belanovsky, 1951
- Species: E. setifacies

Binomial name
- Eulabidogaster setifacies (Rondani, 1861)

Synonyms
- Labidogaster setifacies Rondani, 1861

Genus of flies

Eulabidogaster is a genus of flies in the family Tachinidae. It is monotypic, being represented by the single species Eulabidogaster setifacies.

== Distribution ==
Europe, Central Asia and the Middle East (Uzbekistan, Czech Republic, Moldova, Poland, Romania, Slovakia, Ukraine, Sweden, Bulgaria, Croatia, Italy, Macedonia, Portugal, Spain, Turkey, Austria, France, Germany, Switzerland, Iran, Israel, Palestine, Canary Islands, Russia, Transcaucasia).
