= Truphia =

Scientific classification
- Kingdom: Animalia
- Phylum: Arthropoda
- Class: Insecta
- Order: Diptera
- Family: Tachinidae
- Subfamily: Phasiinae
- Tribe: Leucostomatini
- Genus: Truphia; Malloch, 1930

Type species
- Truphia grisea Malloch, 1930

Genus of flies

Truphia is a monotypic genus of flies in the family Tachinidae. The sole member, Truphia grisea is endemic to New Zealand.
