= Cinochira =

Scientific classification
- Kingdom: Animalia
- Phylum: Arthropoda
- Clade: Pancrustacea
- Class: Insecta
- Order: Diptera
- Family: Tachinidae
- Subfamily: Phasiinae
- Tribe: Leucostomatini
- Genus: Cinochira; Zetterstedt, 1845

Type species
- Cinochira atra Zetterstedt, 1845

Synonyms
- Baromyia Reinhard, 1957

Genus of flies

Cinochira is a genus of flies in the family Tachinidae.

== Species ==
- Cinochira atra Zetterstedt, 1845
- Cinochira mitis (Reinhard, 1957)
