= Coriomeris humilis =

Scientific classification
- Domain: Eukaryota
- Kingdom: Animalia
- Phylum: Arthropoda
- Class: Insecta
- Order: Hemiptera
- Suborder: Heteroptera
- Family: Coreidae
- Tribe: Pseudophloeini
- Genus: Coriomeris
- Species: C. humilis

Binomial name
- Coriomeris humilis (Uhler, 1872)

Species of true bug

Coriomeris humilis is a species of leaf-footed bug in the family Coreidae. It is found in North America.
