= Cahenia =

Scientific classification
- Kingdom: Animalia
- Phylum: Arthropoda
- Clade: Pancrustacea
- Class: Insecta
- Order: Diptera
- Family: Tachinidae
- Subfamily: Phasiinae
- Tribe: Leucostomatini
- Genus: Cahenia; Verbeke, 1960

Type species
- Cahenia mima Verbeke, 1960

Synonyms
- Mapolomyia Verbeke, 1960

Genus of flies

Cahenia is a genus of flies in the family Tachinidae.

== Species ==
- Cahenia connexa (Verbeke, 1960)
- Cahenia mima Verbeke, 1960

== Distribution ==
D.R. Congo
