= Calyptromyia =

Scientific classification
- Kingdom: Animalia
- Phylum: Arthropoda
- Clade: Pancrustacea
- Class: Insecta
- Order: Diptera
- Family: Tachinidae
- Subfamily: Phasiinae
- Tribe: Leucostomatini
- Genus: Calyptromyia; Villeneuve, 1915

Type species
- Calyptromyia barbata Villeneuve, 1915

Genus of flies

Calyptromyia is a genus of flies in the family Tachinidae.

== Species ==
- Calyptromyia barbata Villeneuve, 1915
- Calyptromyia stupenda Dear, 1981
