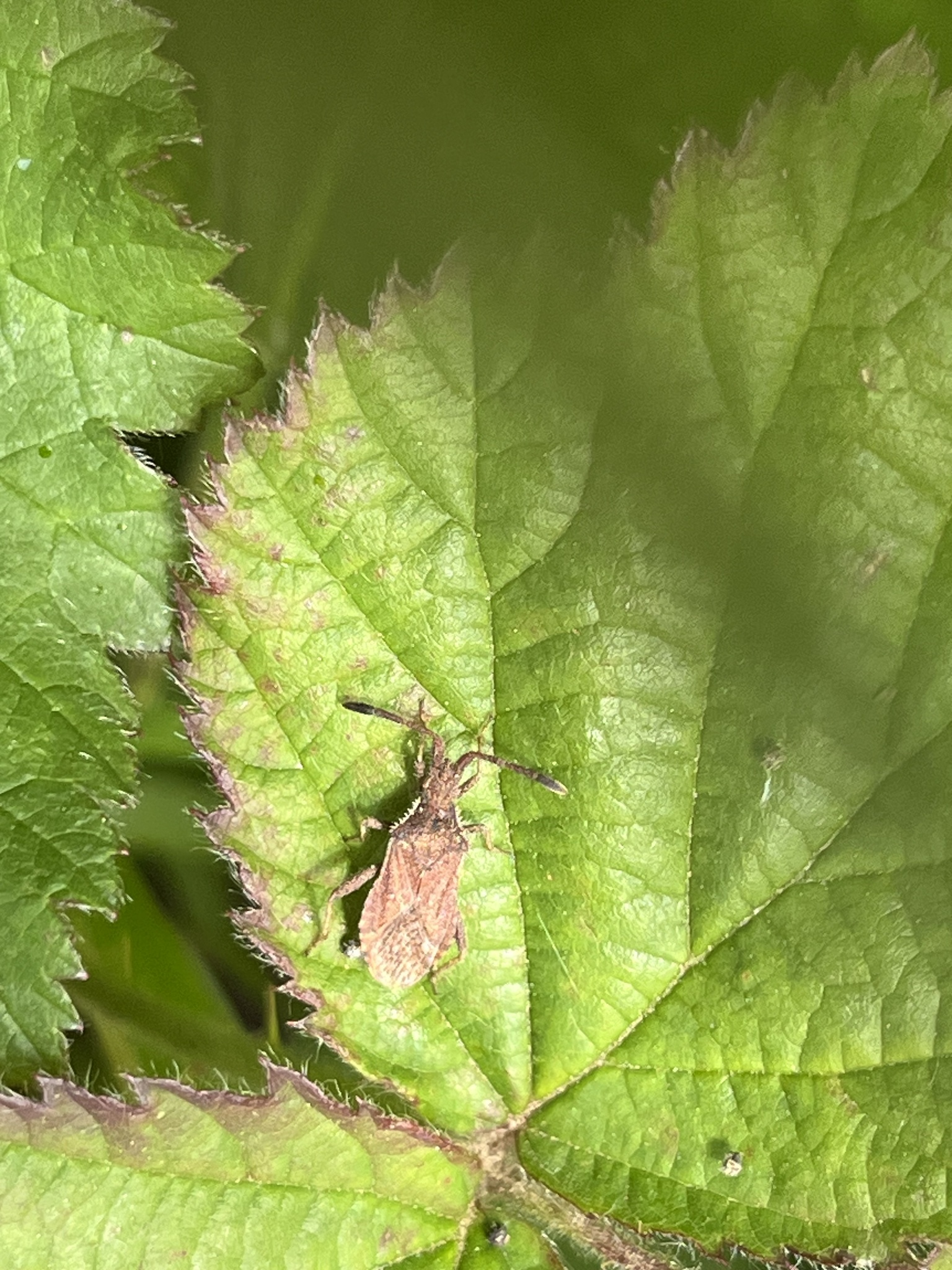

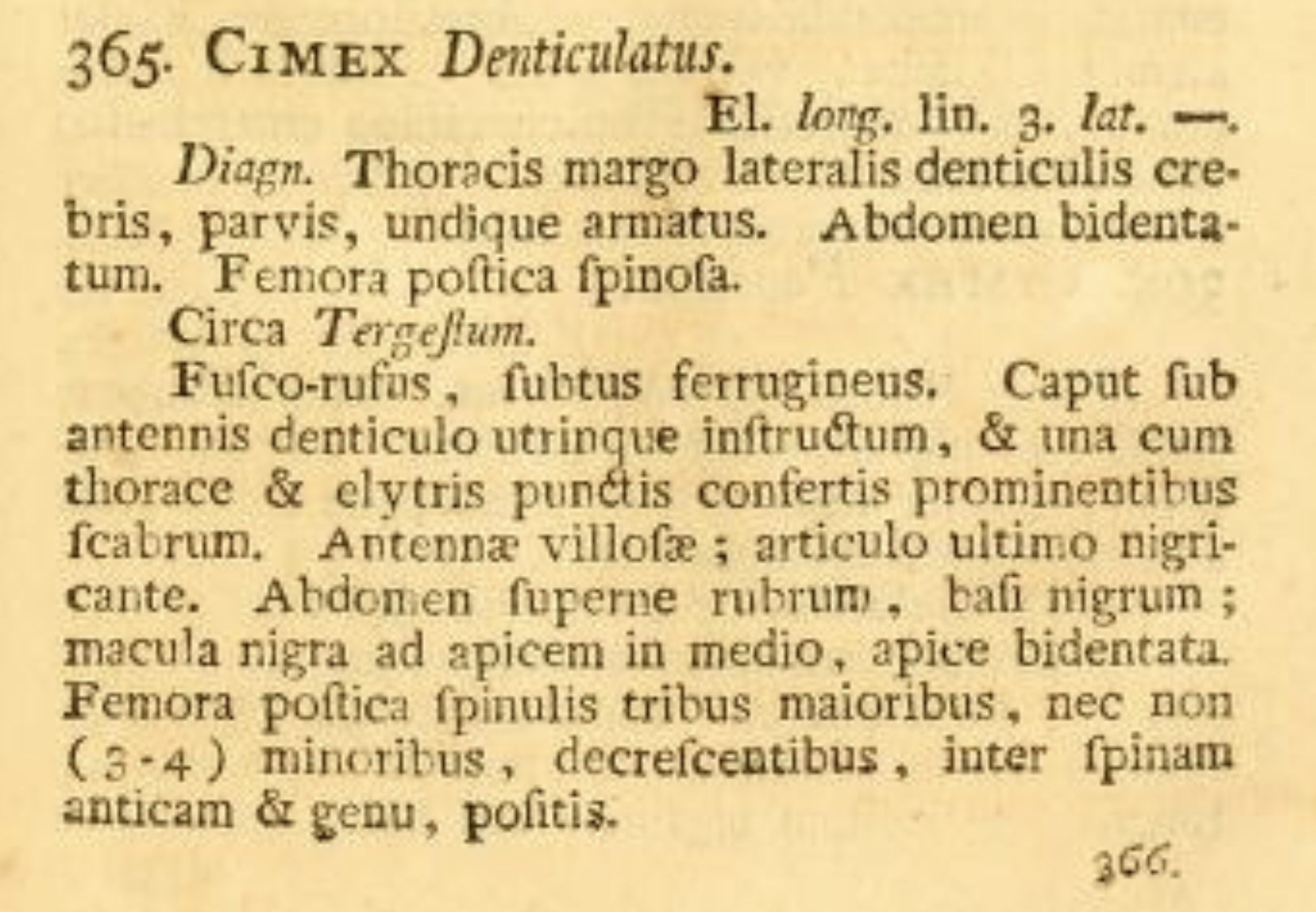

Scientific classification
- Domain: Eukaryota
- Kingdom: Animalia
- Phylum: Arthropoda
- Class: Insecta
- Order: Hemiptera
- Suborder: Heteroptera
- Family: Coreidae
- Genus: Coriomeris
- Species: C. denticulatus

Binomial name
- Coriomeris denticulatus (Scopoli, 1763)

= Coriomeris denticulatus =

Species of insect

Coriomeris denticulatus, also known by its common name denticulate leatherbug, is a species from the genus Coriomeris.

== Description ==
Coriomeris denticulatus is a small, brownish bug measuring 8.5 to 10 mm. It features a quadrangular head, short space between the eyes, and a toothed posterior pronotal edge. Its antennae have four segments with the third as long as the second, and the hind femora have two large teeth. This species can be identified by its moderately difficult characteristics, distinguishing it from similar species like Coriomeris affinis. Observed from April to September, peaking in May, it is polyphagous on over 20 plant species, mainly found on clovers and melilotus. Adults and nymphs overwinter in leaf litter or moss, with eggs laid in June-July and a new generation appearing mid-July to mid-September. It is native to Western Europe, extending to the Ural Mountains, Turkey, Israel, and North Africa, favoring dry, sandy areas, forest edges, and sunny, warm locations.

== Taxonomy ==
The species was originally described by its basionym Cimex denticulatus by Giovanni Antonio Scopoli and is now classified under the genus Coriomeris. The original description notes that the side edges of the thorax have many small teeth. The abdomen has two points, and the back legs have spines. It is dark reddish-brown with a rust-colored underside. The head has a small tooth on each side below the antennae and, like the thorax and elytra, is covered with many small, raised dots. The antennae are hairy, with the last segment being blackish. The top of the abdomen is red with a black base and has a black spot in the middle near the tip, which has two points. The back legs have three large spines and several smaller, decreasing spines between the front spine and the knee.

Since its original description, the species has been reclassified and described leading to many taxonomic synonyms:

- Cimex denticulatus Scopoli, 1763
- Cimex fimbriatus Geoffroy, 1785
- Cimex immaculatus Gmelin, 1790
- Cimex spinosomarginatus Goeze, 1778
- Cimex spinosulus Sulzer, 1776
- Coreus denticulatus (Scopoli, 1763)
- Coreus pilicornis Burmeister, 1835
- Coreus spiniger Roth von Schreckenstein, 1802
- Coreus wolfi Gorski, 1852
- Coriomeris granulatus Cerutti, 1937
- Merocoris denticulatus (Scopoli, 1763)
