= Apomorphomyia =

Scientific classification
- Kingdom: Animalia
- Phylum: Arthropoda
- Class: Insecta
- Order: Diptera
- Family: Tachinidae
- Subfamily: Phasiinae
- Tribe: Leucostomatini
- Genus: Apomorphomyia; Crosskey, 1984

Type species
- Apomorphomyia lygaeidophaga Crosskey, 1984

Genus of flies

Apomorphomyia is a genus of flies in the family Tachinidae.

== Species ==
- Apomorphomyia lygaeidophaga Crosskey, 1984

== Distribution ==
South Africa.
