= Dionomelia =

Scientific classification
- Kingdom: Animalia
- Phylum: Arthropoda
- Class: Insecta
- Order: Diptera
- Family: Tachinidae
- Subfamily: Phasiinae
- Tribe: Leucostomatini
- Genus: Dionomelia; Kugler, 1978

Type species
- Dionomelia hennigi Kugler, 1978

Genus of flies

Dionomelia is a genus of flies in the family Tachinidae.

== Species ==
- Dionomelia hennigi Kugler, 1978

== Distribution ==
Spain, Israel, Egypt, United Arab Emirates.
