= Labigastera =

Scientific classification
- Kingdom: Animalia
- Phylum: Arthropoda
- Class: Insecta
- Order: Diptera
- Family: Tachinidae
- Subfamily: Phasiinae
- Tribe: Leucostomatini
- Genus: Labigastera; Macquart, 1834

Synonyms
- Labidigaster Meigen, 1838; Labidogaster Brauer & von Berganstamm, 1889; Labidogyne Brauer & von Berganstamm, 1889; Labigaster Macquart, 1835; Pyragrura Rondani, 1861

Genus of flies

Labigastera is a genus of flies in the family Tachinidae.

== Species ==
- Labigastera forcipata (Meigen, 1824)
- Labigastera latiforceps Tschorsnig, 2000
- Labigastera nitidula (Meigen, 1824)
- Labigastera pauciseta (Rondani, 1861)
