= Camptozygum =

Scientific classification
- Kingdom: Animalia
- Phylum: Arthropoda
- Clade: Pancrustacea
- Class: Insecta
- Order: Hemiptera
- Suborder: Heteroptera
- Family: Miridae
- Subfamily: Mirinae
- Tribe: Mirini
- Genus: Camptozygum; Reuter, 1896

Genus of true bugs

Camptozygum is a genus of plant bugs in the family Miridae. There are at least two described species in Camptozygum.

== Species ==
These two species belong to the genus Camptozygum:

- Camptozygum aequale (Villers, 1789)
- Camptozygum pumilio Reuter, 1902
