= Pseudobrullaea =

Scientific classification
- Kingdom: Animalia
- Phylum: Arthropoda
- Class: Insecta
- Order: Diptera
- Family: Tachinidae
- Subfamily: Phasiinae
- Tribe: Leucostomatini
- Genus: Pseudobrullaea; Mesnil, 1957

Type species
- Pseudobrullaea aberrans Mesnil, 1957

Genus of flies

Pseudobrullaea is a genus of flies in the family Tachinidae.

== Species ==
- Pseudobrullaea aberrans Mesnil, 1957

== Distribution ==
Myanmar.
