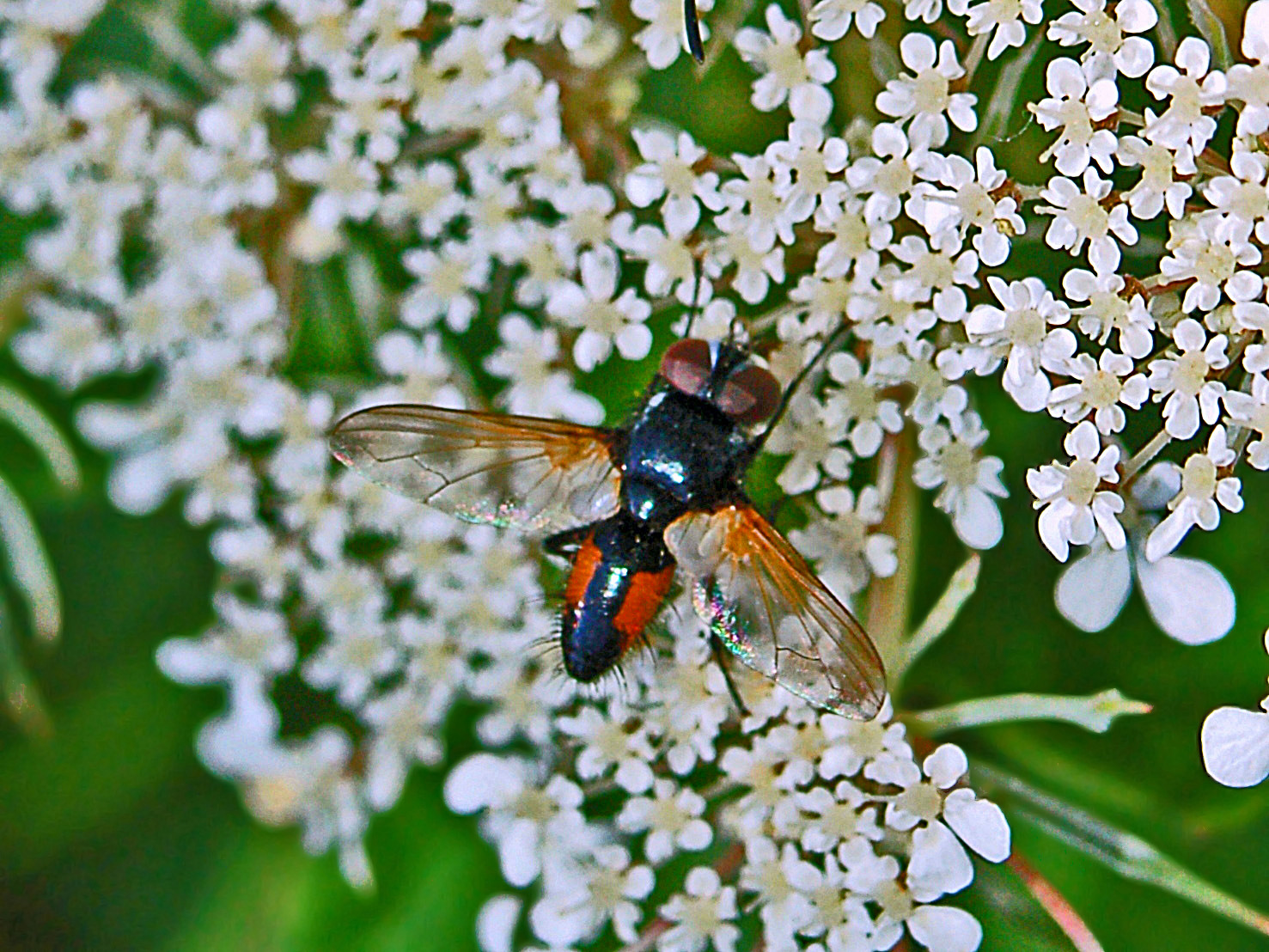

Scientific classification
- Kingdom: Animalia
- Phylum: Arthropoda
- Class: Insecta
- Order: Diptera
- Family: Tachinidae
- Subfamily: Phasiinae
- Tribe: Leucostomatini
- Genus: Clairvillia; Robineau-Desvoidy, 1830

Type species
- Ocyptera pusilla Meigen, 1824

Synonyms
- Clairvilliops Mesnil, 1959; Neodionaea Townsend, 1916; Phanemia Macquart, 1835; Phanemya Robineau-Desvoidy, 1830; Phanemyia Agassiz, 1846

= Clairvillia =

Genus of flies

Clairvillia is a genus of flies in the family Tachinidae.

== Species ==
- Clairvillia amicta Reinhard, 1962
- Clairvillia biguttata (Meigen, 1824)
- Clairvillia curialis Reinhard, 1958
- Clairvillia furcata (Wulp, 1890)
- Clairvillia nitoris (Coquillett, 1898)
- Clairvillia pninae Kugler, 1971
- Clairvillia timberlakei (Walton, 1914)
