= Periostoma =

Scientific classification
- Kingdom: Animalia
- Phylum: Arthropoda
- Class: Insecta
- Order: Diptera
- Family: Tachinidae
- Subfamily: Phasiinae
- Tribe: Leucostomatini
- Genus: Periostoma; Cortés, 1986

Type species
- Periostoma flabellatum Cortés, 1986

Genus of flies

Periostoma is a genus of flies in the family Tachinidae.

== Species ==
- Periostoma flabellatum Cortés, 1986

== Distribution ==
Chile.
