= Takanoella =

Scientific classification
- Kingdom: Animalia
- Phylum: Arthropoda
- Clade: Pancrustacea
- Class: Insecta
- Order: Diptera
- Family: Tachinidae
- Subfamily: Phasiinae
- Tribe: Leucostomatini
- Genus: Takanoella; Baranov, 1935

Genus of flies

Takanoella is a genus of flies in the family Tachinidae.

== Species ==
- Takanoella flava Wang, Zhang & Wang, 2015
- Takanoella parvicornis Baranov, 1935
