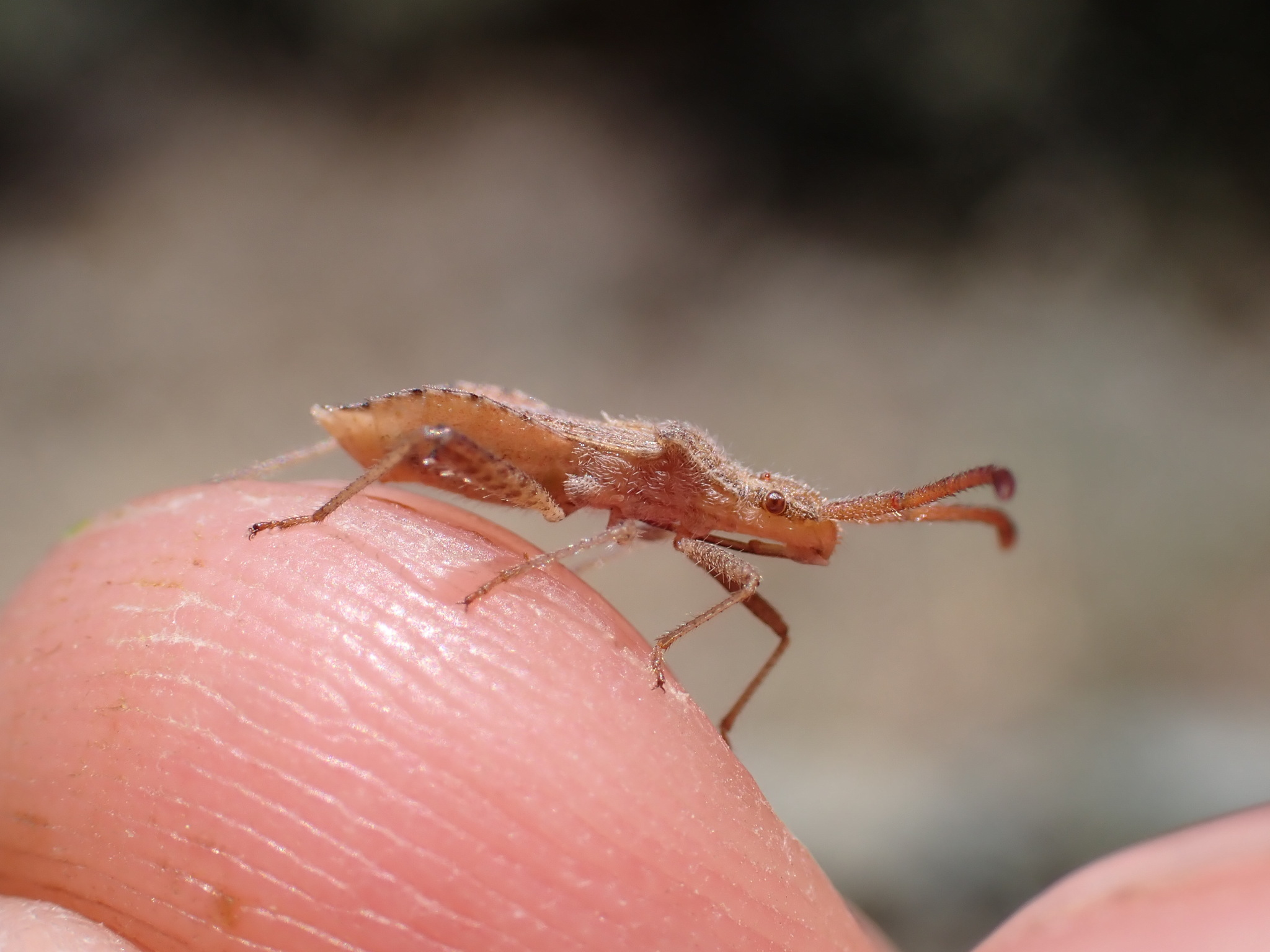

Scientific classification
- Domain: Eukaryota
- Kingdom: Animalia
- Phylum: Arthropoda
- Class: Insecta
- Order: Hemiptera
- Suborder: Heteroptera
- Family: Coreidae
- Genus: Coriomeris
- Species: C. affinis

Binomial name
- Coriomeris affinis (Herrich-Schäffer, 1839)

= Coriomeris affinis =

Species of insect

Coriomeris affinis is a species of bug in the genus Coriomeris.

== Distribution ==
When the species was originally described it was found in Portugal. Recent observations show a distribution that spans the countries around the Mediterranean Sea and the Black Sea.

== Taxonomy ==
The species was originally described by its basionym Coreus affinis by Gottlieb August Wilhelm Herrich-Schäffer but has since then been classified under the genus Coriomeris. The original description notes that the species has a purplish cinnamon-colored appearance, with the third and fourth segments of the antennae being of equal length. The fifth segment is almost thicker. The sides of the shield have multiple small teeth, while the back has two white teeth. Since its original description, the species has been reclassified and described leading to many taxonomic synonyms:

- Coreus affinis var. spinolae (A.Costa, 1843)
- Coreus spinolae
- Coriomeris aegyptius Schmidt, 1939
- Coriomeris fraudatrix Reuter, 1900
- Coriomeris planicornis Lindberg, 1923
- Coriomeris spinolae (A.Costa, 1843)
- Coriomeris spinolae var. fraudatrix Reuter, 1900
- Dasycoris affinis (Herrich-Schäffer, 1839)
- Dasycoris spinolae
- Merocoris spinolae Costa, 1843

== Similar species ==
This species is very similar to C. pilicornis, but is slightly larger. The last segment of the antenna is as long as the penultimate segment and somewhat thicker. The color of Coriomeris affinis is much more vivid, cinnamon-red, with a lighter, yellowish underside and four front legs.
