= Dionaea (fly) =

Scientific classification
- Kingdom: Animalia
- Phylum: Arthropoda
- Class: Insecta
- Order: Diptera
- Family: Tachinidae
- Subfamily: Phasiinae
- Tribe: Leucostomatini
- Genus: Dionaea; Robineau-Desvoidy, 1830

Type species
- Dinaea forcipata Robineau-Desvoidy, 1830

Genus of flies

Dionaea is a genus of flies in the family Tachinidae.

== Species ==
- Dionaea aurifrons (Meigen, 1824)
- Dionaea brevidorceps (Emden, 1954)
- Dionaea flavisquamis Robineau-Desvoidy, 1863
- Dionaea karinae Draber-Mońko, 2009
- Dionaea magnifrons Herting, 1977
