= Charles Joseph Devillers =

French naturalist (1724–1810)

Charles Joseph Devillers or de Villers (1724 in Rennes – 1810) was a French naturalist.

Charles Devillers was a member of l’Académie des sciences belles-lettres et arts de Lyon from 1764 to 1810. He had a cabinet of curiosities and was interested in physics and mathematics. He published Caroli Linnaei entomologia, in 1789, a collection of the insect descriptions of Carl von Linné. He was a friend of Philibert Commerson (1727–1773), Jean-Emmanuel Gilibert (1741–1814) and Marc Antoine Louis Claret de La Tourrette (1729–1793).
