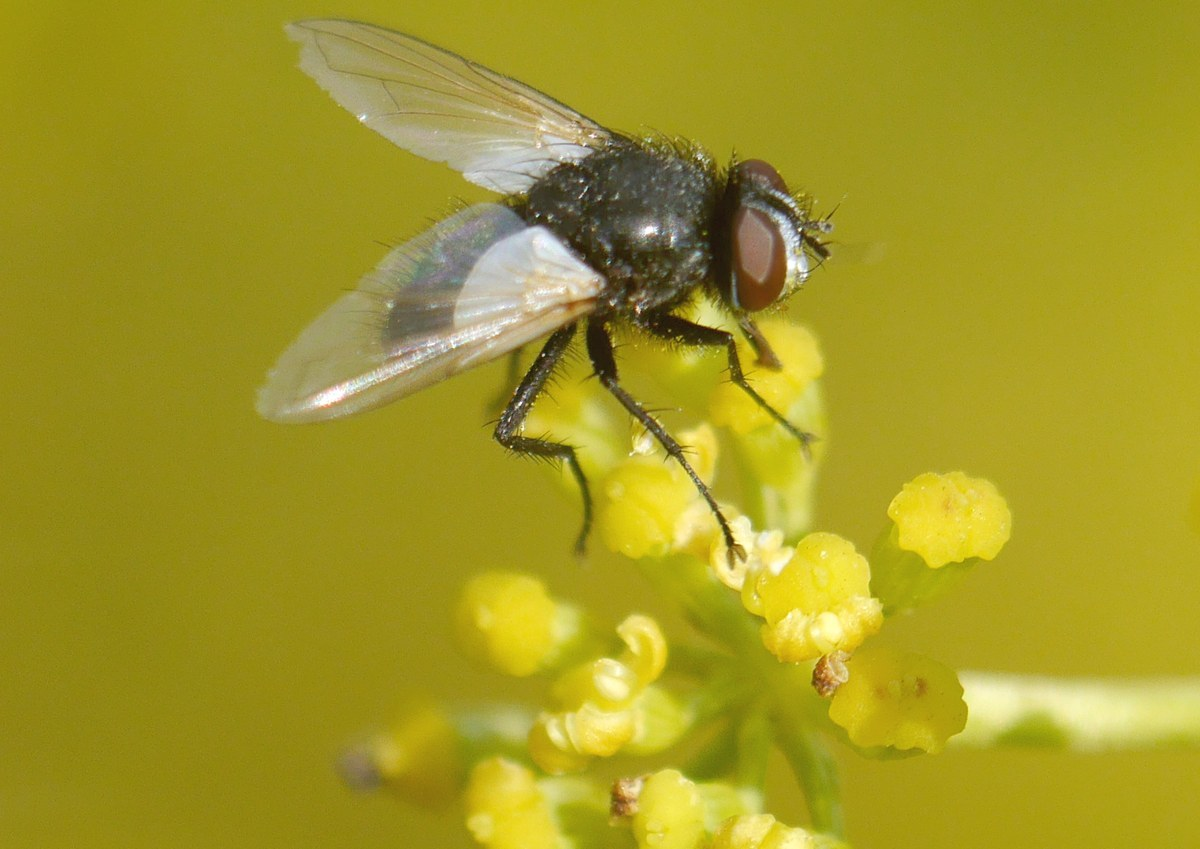
- Leucostoma, Ukraine

Scientific classification
- Kingdom: Animalia
- Phylum: Arthropoda
- Class: Insecta
- Order: Diptera
- Family: Tachinidae
- Subfamily: Phasiinae
- Tribe: Leucostomatini

= Leucostomatini =

Tribe of flies

Leucostomatini is a tribe of flies in the family Tachinidae, found worldwide.

== Genera ==
- Apomorphomyia Crosskey, 1984
- Brullaea Robineau-Desvoidy, 1863
- Cahenia Verbeke, 1960
- Calyptromyia Villeneuve, 1915
- Cinochira Zetterstedt, 1844
- Clairvillia Robineau-Desvoidy, 1830
- Clairvilliops Mesnil, 1959
- Clelimyia Herting, 1981
- Dionaea Robineau-Desvoidy, 1830
- Dionomelia Kugler, 1978
- Eulabidogaster Belanovsky, 1951
- Labigastera Macquart, 1834
- Leucostoma Meigen, 1803
- Oblitoneura Mesnil, 1975
- Periostoma Cortés, 1986
- Pradocania Tschorsnig, 1997
- Psalidoxena Villeneuve, 1941
- Pseudobrullaea Mesnil, 1957
- Takanoella Baranov, 1935
- Truphia Malloch, 1930
- Weberia Robineau-Desvoidy, 1830
