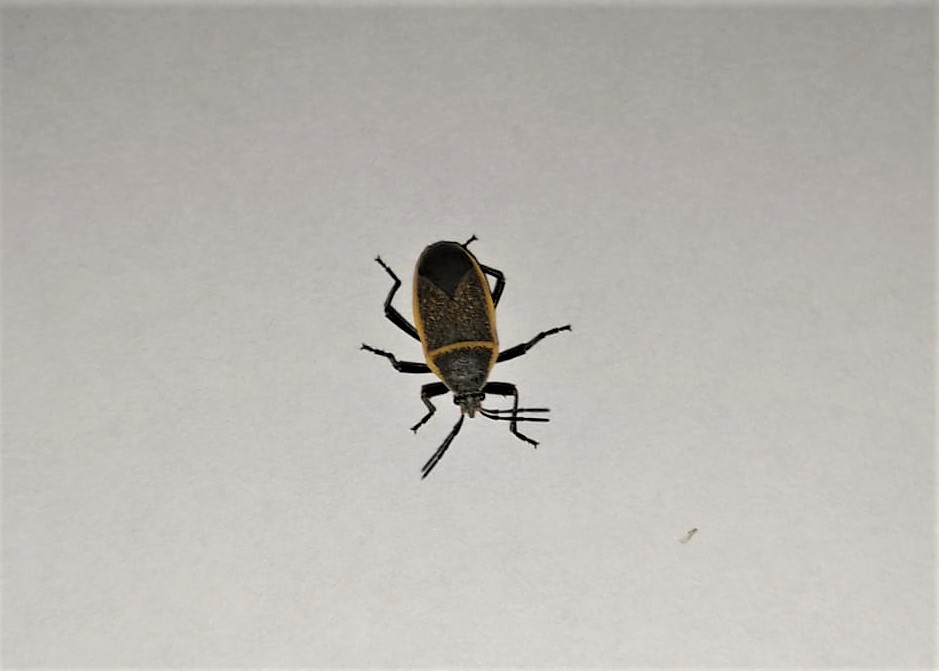

Scientific classification
- Domain: Eukaryota
- Kingdom: Animalia
- Phylum: Arthropoda
- Class: Insecta
- Order: Hemiptera
- Suborder: Heteroptera
- Family: Largidae
- Genus: Largus
- Species: L. californicus

Binomial name
- Largus californicus (Van Duzee, 1923)

= Largus californicus =

Species of true bug

Largus californicus, also known as the California bordered plant bug, is a species of bordered plant bug in the family Largidae. It is found in western North America, as well as parts of Central America.

They measure around 2.5 cm (0.98 in) in length. Adults have a black exoskeleton with orange edges on the thorax and abdomen. Nymphs are metallic blue, later with a red spot at the base of the abdomen. They are indistinguishable in appearance from Largus cinctus.
