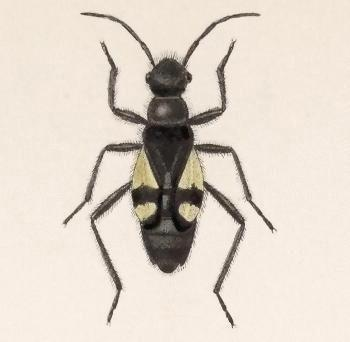

Scientific classification
- Kingdom: Animalia
- Phylum: Arthropoda
- Class: Insecta
- Order: Hemiptera
- Suborder: Heteroptera
- Family: Largidae
- Genus: Arhaphe
- Species: A. cicindeloides

Binomial name
- Arhaphe cicindeloides Walker, 1873

= Arhaphe cicindeloides =

Species of true bug

Arhaphe cicindeloides is a species of bordered plant bug in the family Largidae. It is found in Central America but all records of this species from the United States are misidentifications of the related Arhaphe arguta.
