= Larginae =

Scientific classification
- Domain: Eukaryota
- Kingdom: Animalia
- Phylum: Arthropoda
- Class: Insecta
- Order: Hemiptera
- Suborder: Heteroptera
- Family: Largidae
- Subfamily: Larginae; Amyot & Serville, 1843

Genera
- see text

Subfamily of true bugs

Larginae is a subfamily of insects within the family Largidae, or bordered plant bugs.

== Selected genera ==
Arhaphe Herrich-Schaeffer, 1850
Largulus Hussey, 1927
Largus Hahn, 1831
Neolargulus Stehlik & Brailovsky, 2011
Paralargulus Stehlik & Brailovsky, 2011
Pararhaphe Henry and Froeschner, 1988
Stenomacra Stål, 1870
Theraneis Spinola, 1937
