= Largus pallidus =

Scientific classification
- Domain: Eukaryota
- Kingdom: Animalia
- Phylum: Arthropoda
- Class: Insecta
- Order: Hemiptera
- Suborder: Heteroptera
- Family: Largidae
- Genus: Largus
- Species: L. pallidus

Binomial name
- Largus pallidus Halstead, 1972

Species of true bug

Largus pallidus is a species of bordered plant bug in the family Largidae. It is found in North America.
