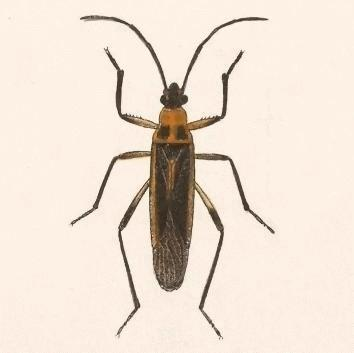

Scientific classification
- Domain: Eukaryota
- Kingdom: Animalia
- Phylum: Arthropoda
- Class: Insecta
- Order: Hemiptera
- Suborder: Heteroptera
- Family: Largidae
- Genus: Stenomacra
- Species: S. marginella

Binomial name
- Stenomacra marginella (Herrich-schaeffer, 1850)

Synonyms
- Largus marginella Herrich-Schaeffer, 1850

= Stenomacra marginella =

Species of true bug

Stenomacra marginella is a species of bordered plant bug in the family Largidae. It is found in Central America, North America, and South America.
