= Arhaphe carolina =

Scientific classification
- Domain: Eukaryota
- Kingdom: Animalia
- Phylum: Arthropoda
- Class: Insecta
- Order: Hemiptera
- Suborder: Heteroptera
- Family: Largidae
- Genus: Arhaphe
- Species: A. carolina

Binomial name
- Arhaphe carolina Herrich-schaeffer, 1850

Species of true bug

Arhaphe carolina is a species of bordered plant bug in the family Largidae. It is found in Central America and North America.
