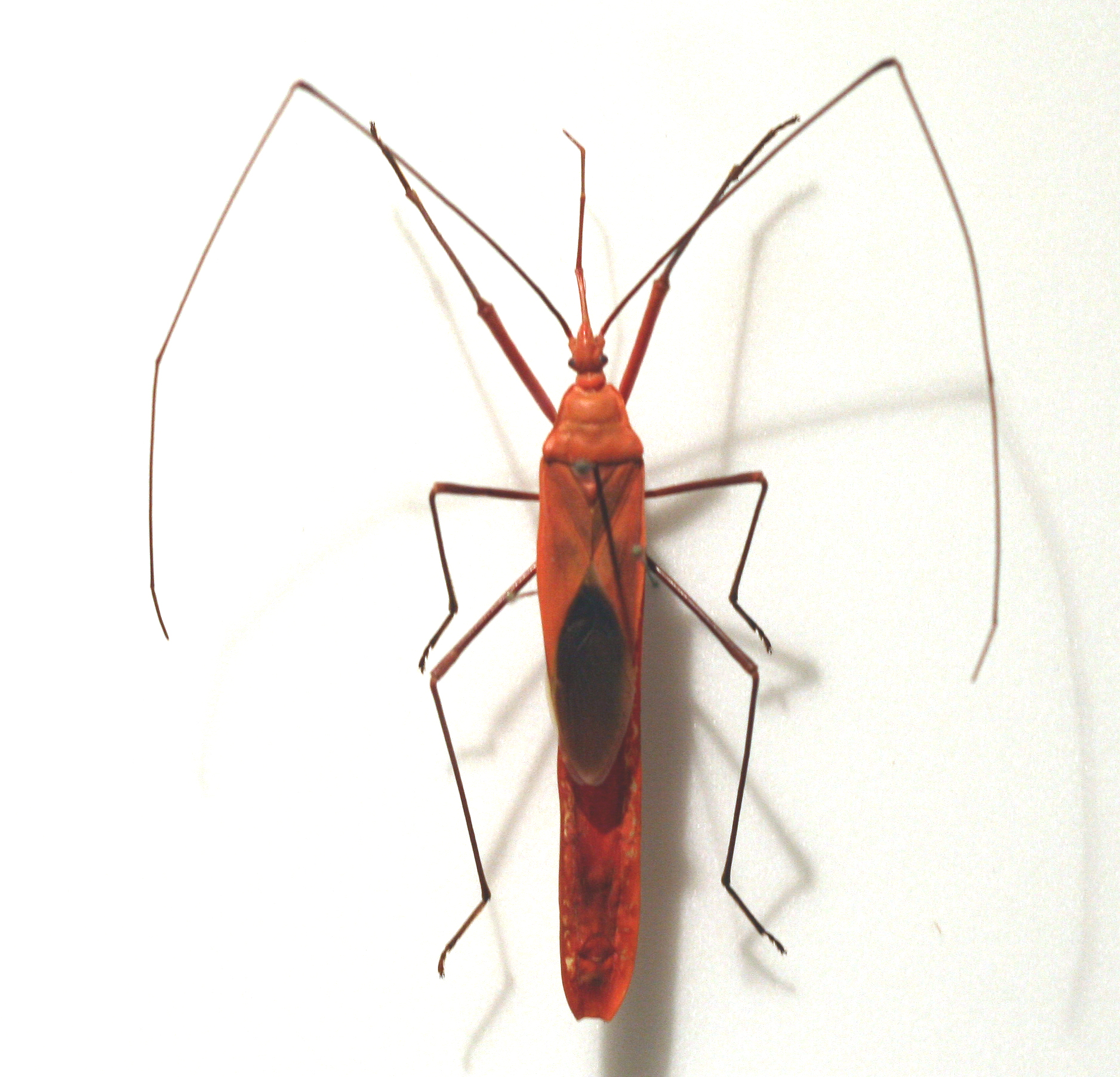
- Male

Scientific classification
- Kingdom: Animalia
- Phylum: Arthropoda
- Clade: Pancrustacea
- Class: Insecta
- Order: Hemiptera
- Suborder: Heteroptera
- Family: Largidae
- Subfamily: Physopeltinae
- Genus: Macrocheraia; Guérin-Ménéville, 1834
- Species: M. grandis

Binomial name
- Macrocheraia grandis (Gray, 1832)

Synonyms
- Lohita grandis Macroceraea grandis Macrocerea grandis Macroceroea grandis

= Macrocheraia =

Genus of true bugs

Macrocheraia is a genus of bugs in the family Largidae with a single species, Macrocheraia grandis found mainly in Southeast Asia but extending into parts of South Asia. This was referred to in some older literature under the genus Lohita, a name derived from the Sanskrit word for red.

The abdomen of the male is long and extends well beyond the wingtip. The abdomen of the female is short. The species feeds on a range of plants including those of the families Euphorbiaceae and Malvaceae.

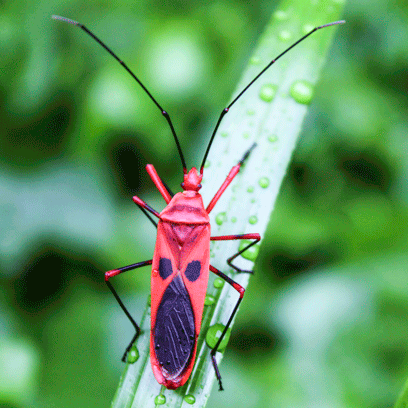
female

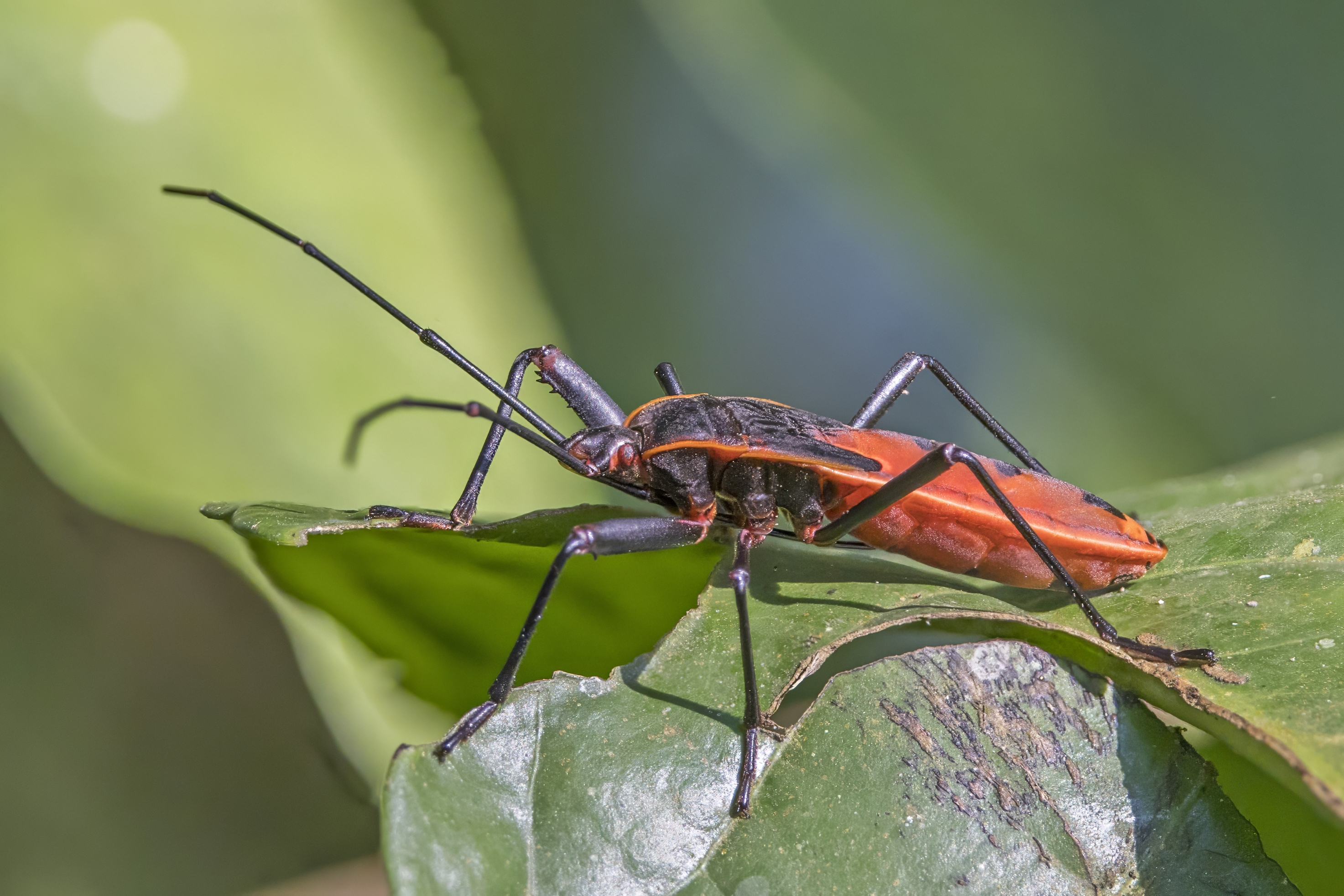
nymph
