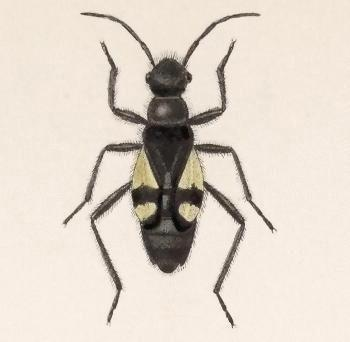
- Arhaphe cicindeloides

Scientific classification
- Domain: Eukaryota
- Kingdom: Animalia
- Phylum: Arthropoda
- Class: Insecta
- Order: Hemiptera
- Suborder: Heteroptera
- Family: Largidae
- Subfamily: Larginae
- Genus: Arhaphe; Herrich-Schaeffer, 1850

Synonyms
- Araphe (misspelling); Arrhaphe (misspelling); Jarhaphetus Bliven, 1956

= Arhaphe =

Genus of true bugs

Arhaphe is a genus of bordered plant bugs in the family Largidae. There are 26 described species in Arhaphe. The genus is one of a small number of hemipterans known to possess a sound-producing stridulitrum, in which the hind femur is rubbed against the costal margin of the forewings.

== Species ==
- Arhaphe arguta (Bliven, 1956)
- Arhaphe breviata Barber, 1924
- Arhaphe capitata Halstead, 1972
- Arhaphe carolina Herrich-schaeffer, 1850
- Arhaphe cicindeloides Walker, 1873
- Arhaphe deviatica Brailovsky, 1981
- Arhaphe ferruginea Stehlik & Brailovsky, 2016
- Arhaphe flavoantennata Stehlik & Brailovsky, 2016
- Arhaphe furcata Brailovsky, 1981
- Arhaphe halsteadi Brailovsky, 1981
- Arhaphe hirsuta Stehlik & Brailovsky, 2016
- Arhaphe hoffmannae Brailovsky, 1996
- Arhaphe kmenti Stehlik & Brailovsky, 2016
- Arhaphe longula Stehlik & Brailovsky, 2016
- Arhaphe magna Stehlik & Brailovsky, 2016
- Arhaphe mexicana Halstead, 1972
- Arhaphe mimetica Barber, 1911
- Arhaphe morelensis Brailovsky & Marquez, 1974
- Arhaphe myrmicoides Stehlik & Brailovsky, 2016
- Arhaphe nigra Brailovsky, 1996
- Arhaphe oaxacana Stehlik & Brailovsky, 2016
- Arhaphe pilifera Stehlik & Brailovsky, 2016
- Arhaphe pisina Brailovsky, 1996
- Arhaphe rustica Brailovsky, 1981
- Arhaphe torquata Brailovsky, 1981
- Arhaphe vegrandis Brailovsky, 1996
