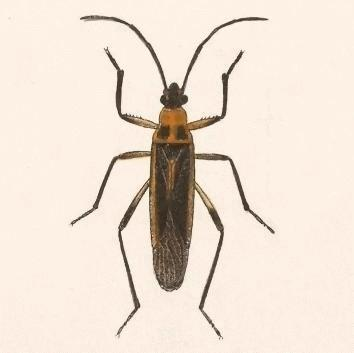
- Stenomacra marginella

Scientific classification
- Kingdom: Animalia
- Phylum: Arthropoda
- Clade: Pancrustacea
- Class: Insecta
- Order: Hemiptera
- Suborder: Heteroptera
- Family: Largidae
- Subfamily: Larginae
- Genus: Stenomacra; Stål, 1870

= Stenomacra =

Genus of true bugs

Stenomacra is a genus of bordered plant bugs in the family Largidae. There are at least eight described species in Stenomacra.

== Species ==
- Stenomacra atra (Brailovsky and Mayorga, 1997)
- Stenomacra dissimilis (Distant, 1883)
- Stenomacra limbatipennis (HStål, 1860)
- Stenomacra magna (Brailovsky and Mayorga, 1997)
- Stenomacra marginella (Herrich-Schaeffer, 1850)
- Stenomacra scapha (Perty, 1833)
- Stenomacra tungurahuana (Brailovsky and Mayorga, 1997)
- Stenomacra turrialbana (Brailovsky and Mayorga, 1997)
