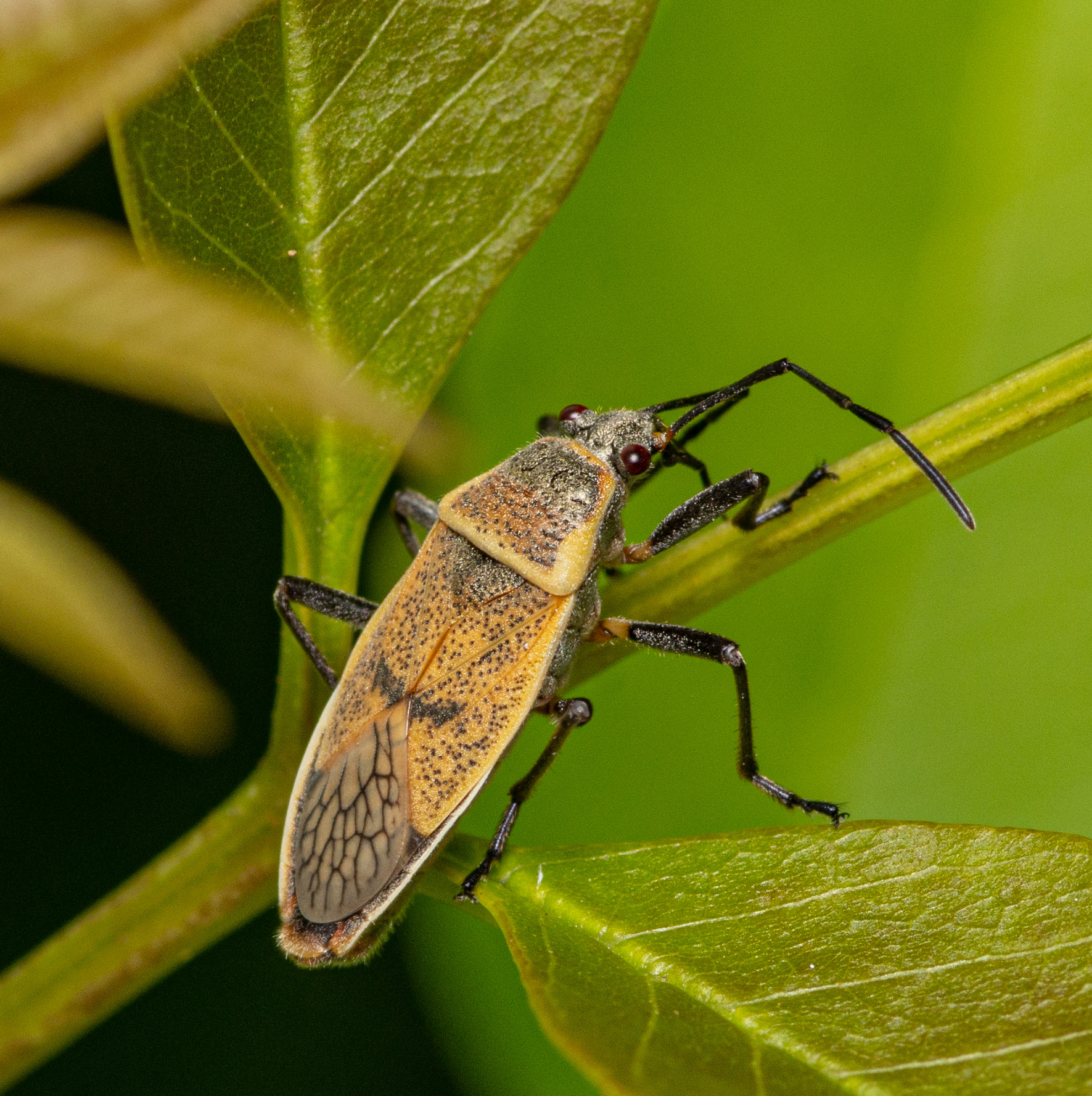

Scientific classification
- Domain: Eukaryota
- Kingdom: Animalia
- Phylum: Arthropoda
- Class: Insecta
- Order: Hemiptera
- Suborder: Heteroptera
- Family: Largidae
- Genus: Largus
- Species: L. maculatus

Binomial name
- Largus maculatus Schmidt, 1931

= Largus maculatus =

Species of insect

Largus maculatus is a species of bordered plant bug in the family Largidae. It is found in Central America and North America.
