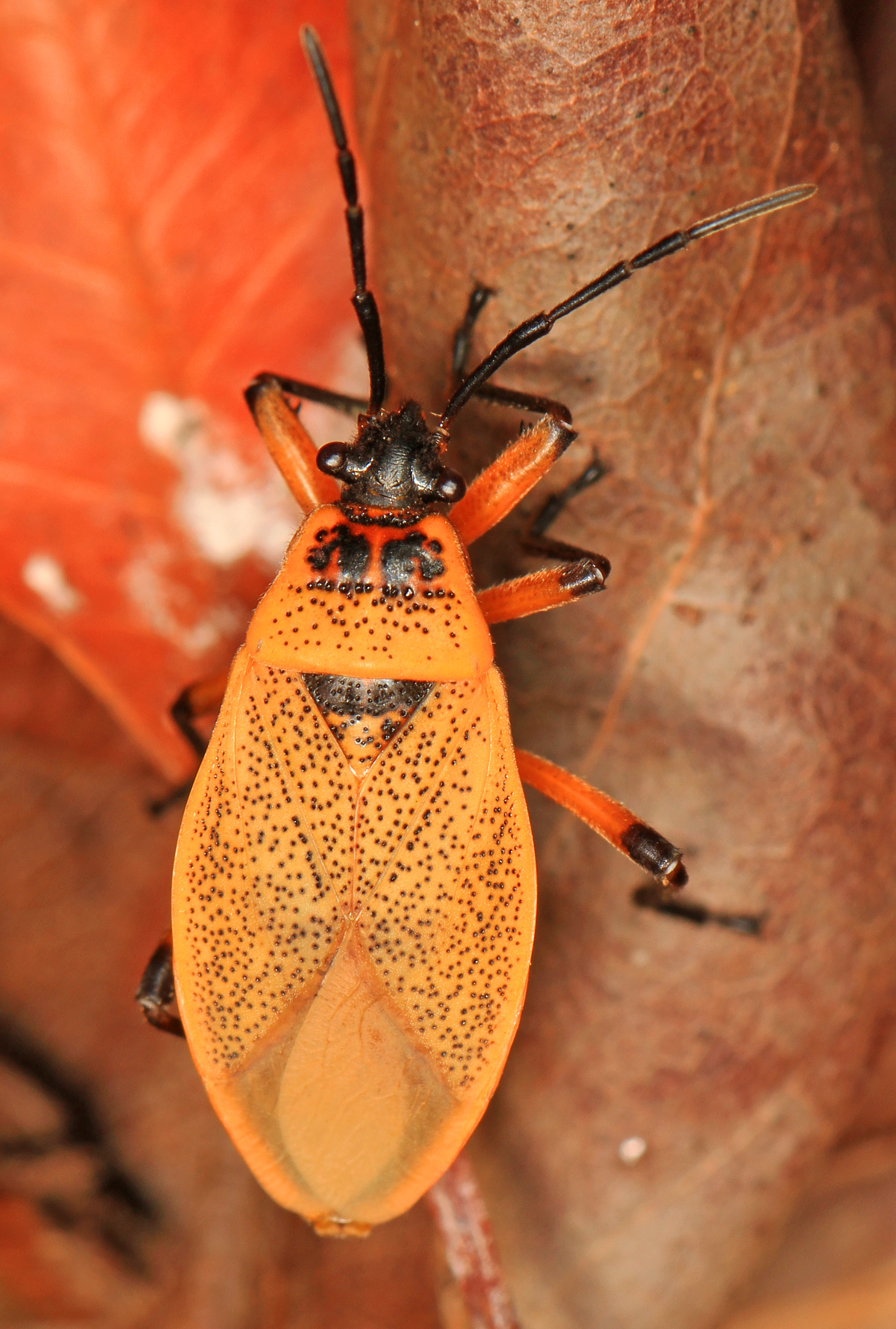

Scientific classification
- Domain: Eukaryota
- Kingdom: Animalia
- Phylum: Arthropoda
- Class: Insecta
- Order: Hemiptera
- Suborder: Heteroptera
- Family: Largidae
- Genus: Largus
- Species: L. davisi

Binomial name
- Largus davisi Barber, 1914

= Largus davisi =

Species of true bug

Largus davisi is a species of bordered plant bug in the family Largidae. It is found in North America.

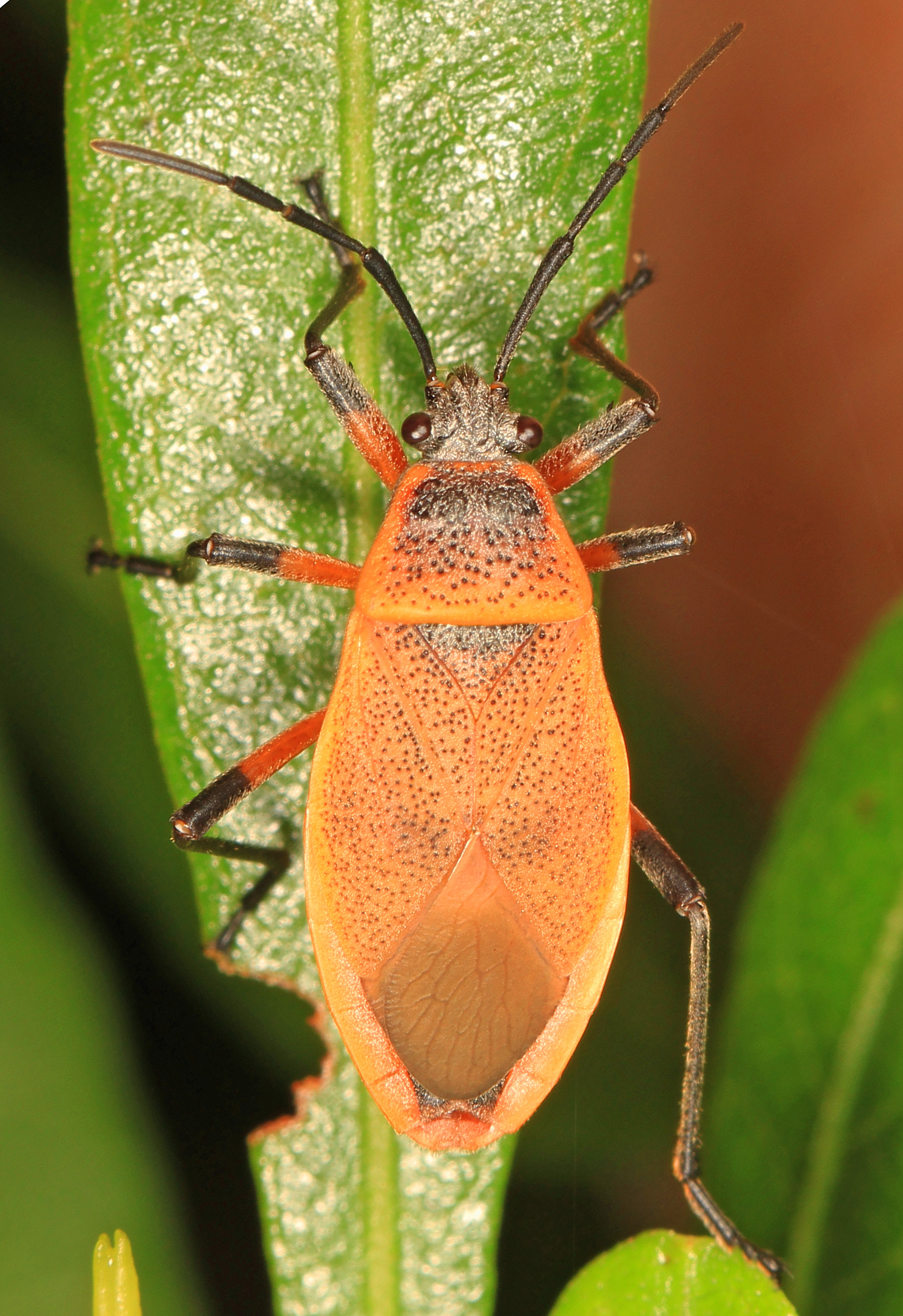
