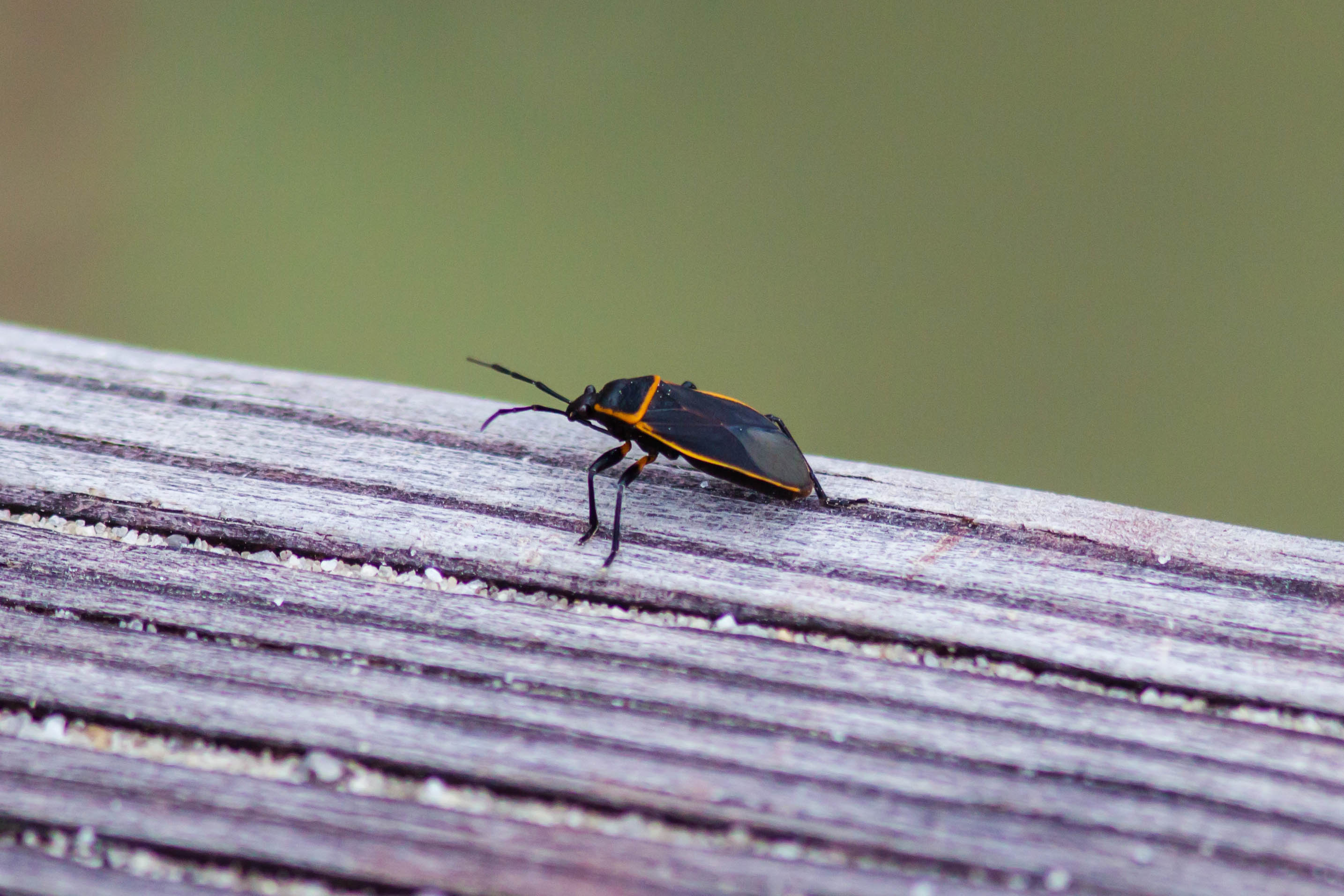

Scientific classification
- Kingdom: Animalia
- Phylum: Arthropoda
- Class: Insecta
- Order: Hemiptera
- Suborder: Heteroptera
- Family: Largidae
- Genus: Largus
- Species: L. succinctus

Binomial name
- Largus succinctus (Linnaeus, 1763)

= Largus succinctus =

Species of true bug

Largus succinctus, known generally as Largus bug, is a species of bordered plant bug in the family Largidae. Other common names include the bordered plant bug and red bug. It is found in North America.
