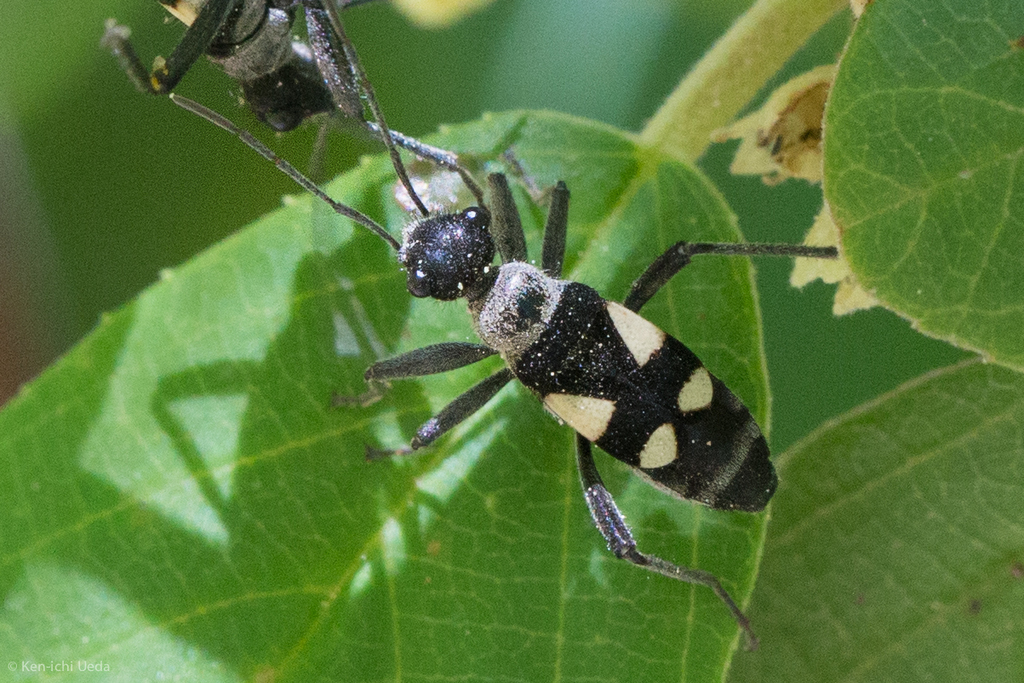

Scientific classification
- Domain: Eukaryota
- Kingdom: Animalia
- Phylum: Arthropoda
- Class: Insecta
- Order: Hemiptera
- Suborder: Heteroptera
- Family: Largidae
- Genus: Arhaphe
- Species: A. arguta

Binomial name
- Arhaphe arguta Bliven, 1956

= Arhaphe arguta =

Species of insect

Arhaphe arguta is a species of bordered plant bug found in the southern United States and Mexico.

== Description ==
Arhaphe arguta is sized around 9 to 10 mm. This species is active from April to October, with most adults found in August and September. Larvae are mostly collected in August and September, sometimes in October. Observations report the species running among dead leaves, on moist sand near creek beds, and under vegetation like Arctostaphylos pungens.

Mating occurs end-to-end, with pairs quickly separating when disturbed. Females have a sharp ovipositor, likely used for egg-laying in leaves or solid substrates. The species is common in Arizona, especially in leaf litter, on bare ground, and under bear grass, with some individuals observed feeding on Bermuda grass.

== Habitat ==
Arhaphe arguta inhabits mountainous areas, particularly canyons along creeks, mountain saddles, and areas near caves and dams.
