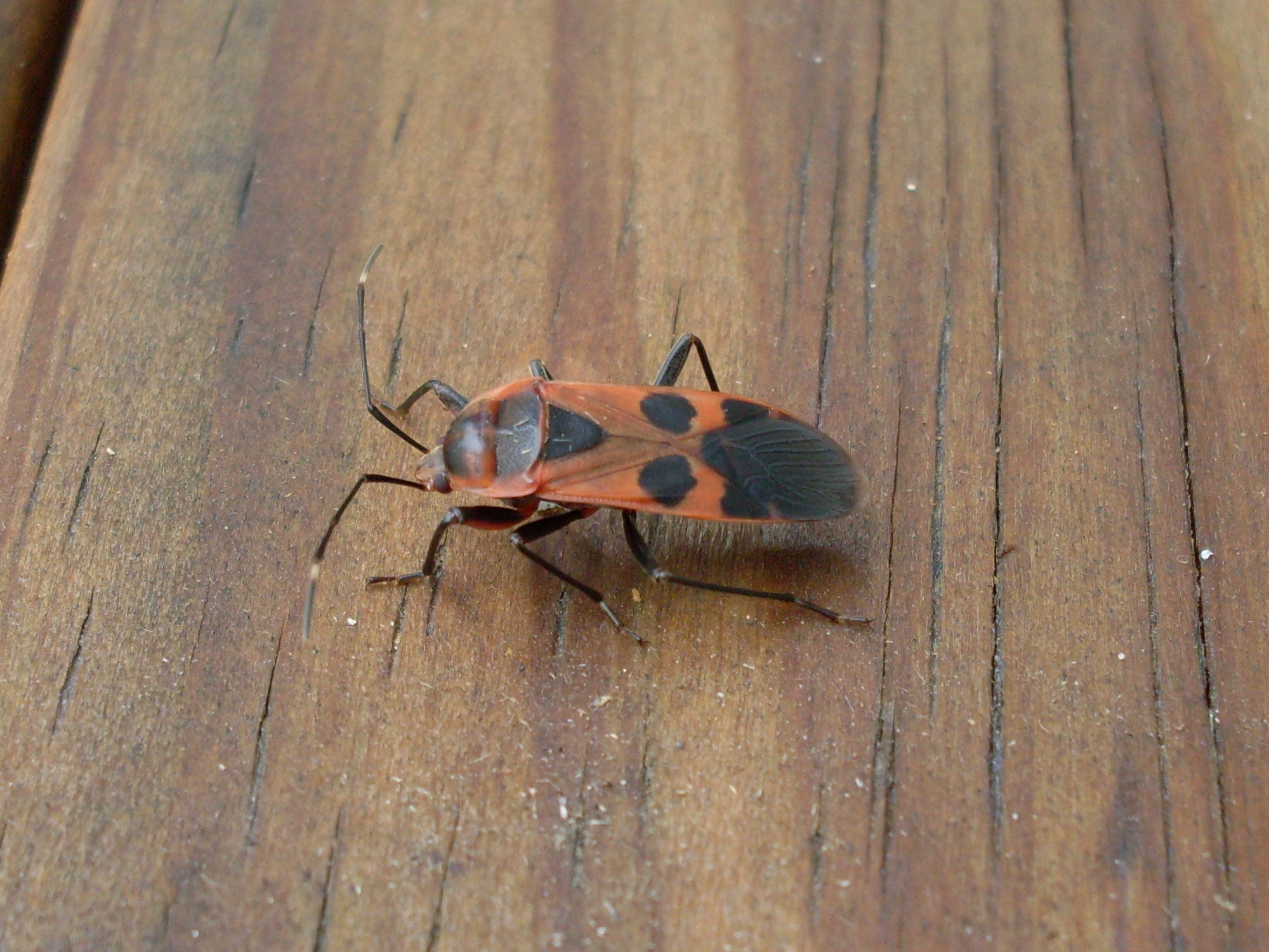
- Physopelta gutta

Scientific classification
- Domain: Eukaryota
- Kingdom: Animalia
- Phylum: Arthropoda
- Class: Insecta
- Order: Hemiptera
- Suborder: Heteroptera
- Family: Largidae
- Subfamily: Physopeltinae
- Tribe: Physopeltini
- Genus: Physopelta; Amyot & Serville, 1843

= Physopelta =

Genus of true bugs

Physopelta is a genus of bordered plant bugs in the family Largidae. There are about 30 described species in Physopelta, found in Asia and Oceania.

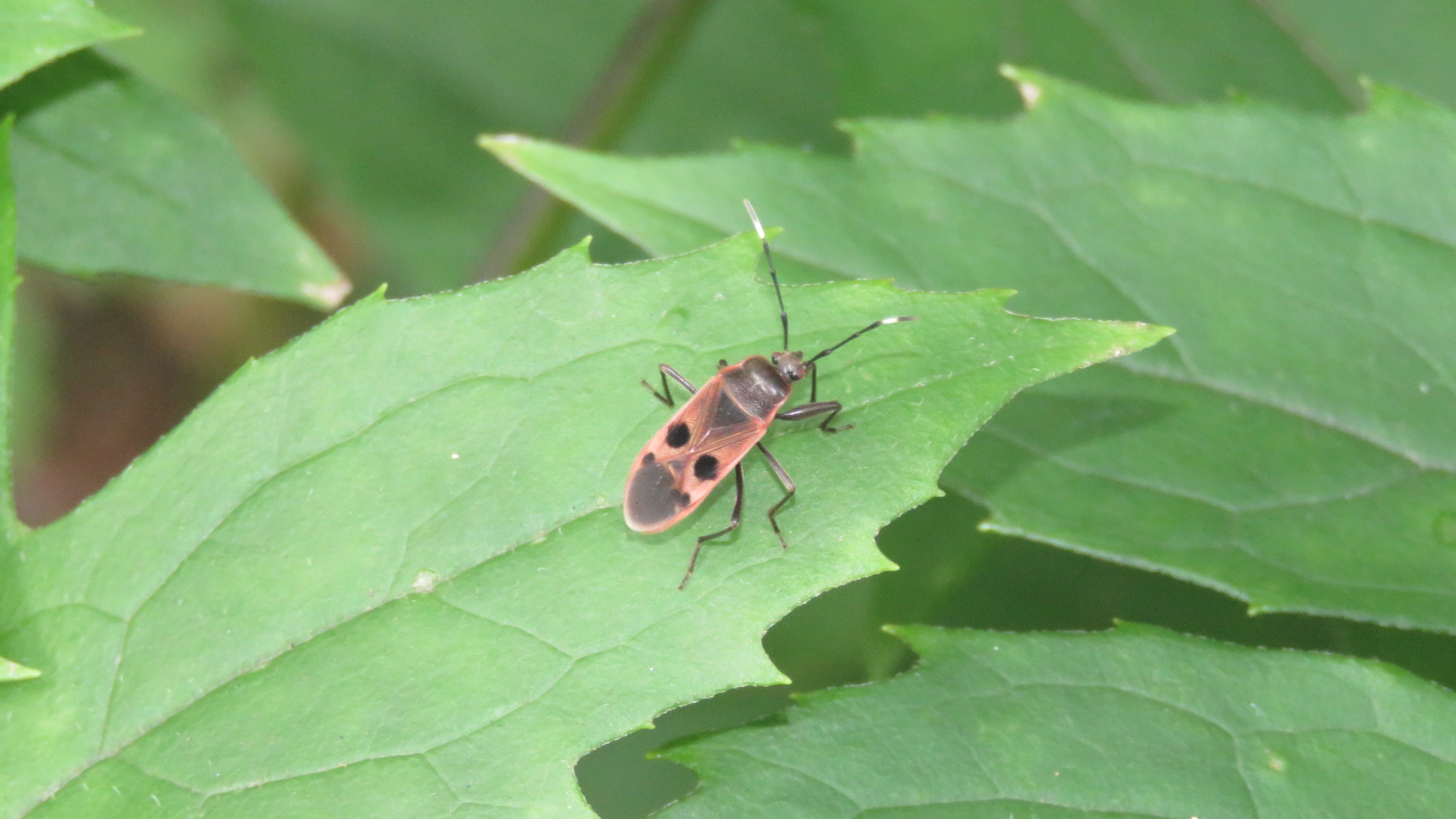
Physopelta parviceps

== Species ==
These species belong to the genus Physopelta:

- Physopelta albofasciata (De Geer, 1773) (southeast Asia, Oceania)
- Physopelta analis (Signoret, 1858) (Africa)
- Physopelta australis Blöte, 1933 (Australia)
- Physopelta biguttata Stål, 1870 (Philippines)
- Physopelta cincticollis Stål, 1863 (east and southeast Asia)
- Physopelta confusa Zamal & Chopra, 1990 (India)
- Physopelta dembickyi Stehlík 2013 (Thailand, Vietnam)
- Physopelta dentipes Stehlík 2013 (Africa)
- Physopelta finisterrae Stehlík & Kment, 2012 (Papua New Guinea)
- Physopelta flavofemoralis Stehlík 2013 (Island of Reunion)
- Physopelta gutta (Burmeister, 1834) (gutta bug) (east and southeast Asia, Indonesia)
- Physopelta indra Kirkaldy & Edwards, 1902 (Indomalaya)
- Physopelta kotheae Stehlik & Jindra, 2008 (Indonesia)
- Physopelta lisae Taeuber, 1927 (Philippines)
- Physopelta madecassa Villiers, 1951 (Comoros, Madagascar)
- Physopelta melanopyga Blöte, 1938 (Philippines)
- Physopelta melanoptera Distant, 1904 (Africa)
- Physopelta nigripes Stehlík 2013 (Philippines)
- Physopelta parviceps Blöte, 1931 (Japan, Taiwan)
- Physopelta parvula Stehlík 2013 (Vietnam)
- Physopelta quadriguttata Bergroth, 1894 (Indomalaya, east Asia)
- Physopelta redeii Stehlík 2013 (Thailand)
- Physopelta robusta Stål, 1863 (China, Indomalaya)
- Physopelta roseni Taeuber, 1927 (Philippines)
- Physopelta rufialata Cachan, 1952 (Madagascar)
- Physopelta sita (Kirby, 1891) (Sri Lanka)
- Physopelta slanbuschii (Fabricius, 1787) (Indomalaya, east Asia)
- Physopelta sulawesiensis Stehlík 2013 (Indonesia)
- Physopelta trimaculata Stehlík & Jindra, 2008 (India)
- Physopelta woodlarkiana (Montrouzier, 1855) (Papua New Guinea)
