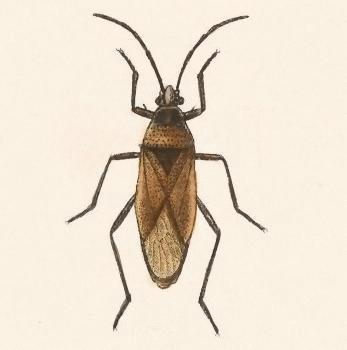

Scientific classification
- Domain: Eukaryota
- Kingdom: Animalia
- Phylum: Arthropoda
- Class: Insecta
- Order: Hemiptera
- Suborder: Heteroptera
- Family: Largidae
- Genus: Largus
- Species: L. cinctus

Binomial name
- Largus cinctus Herrich-schaeffer, 1842

= Largus cinctus =

Species of true bug

Largus cinctus is a species of bordered plant bug in the family Largidae. It is found in Central America, North America, and South America.

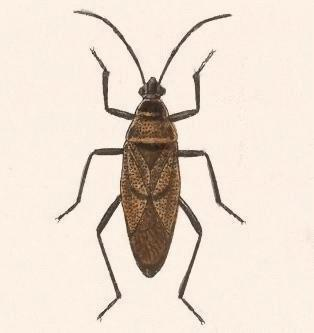
