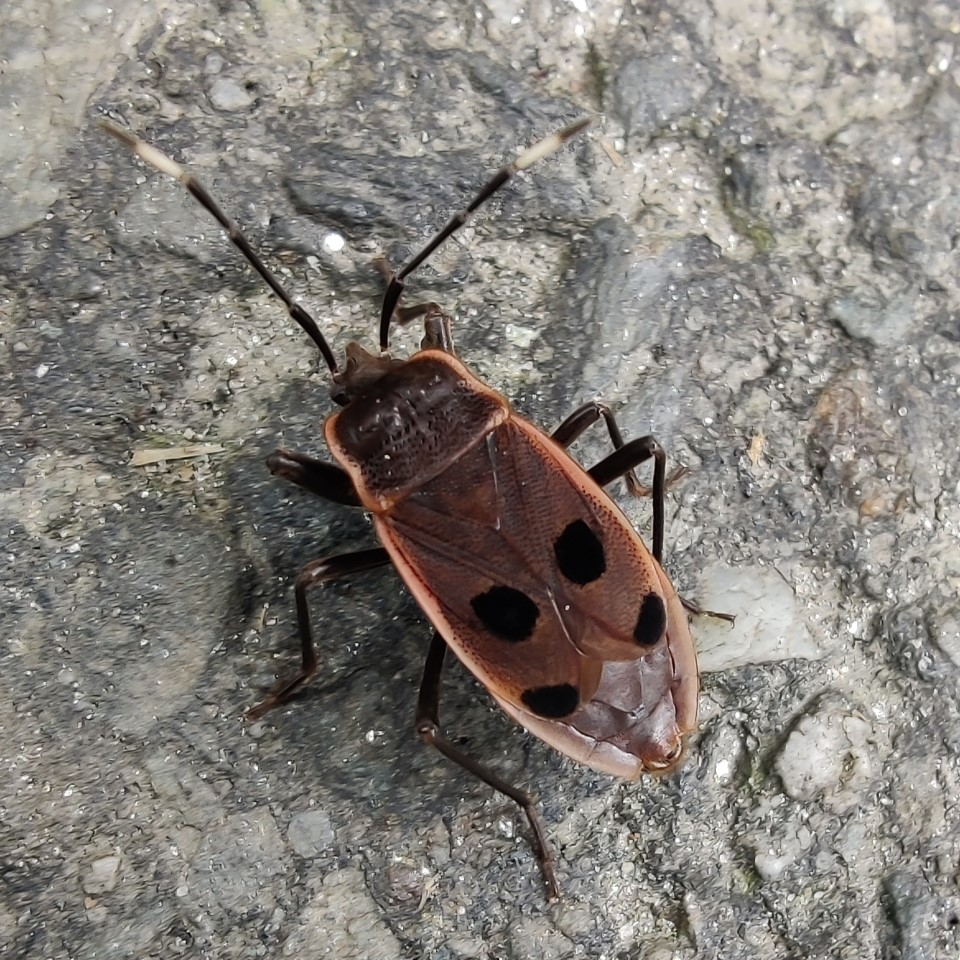
- Jindraia dimorphica

Scientific classification
- Kingdom: Animalia
- Phylum: Arthropoda
- Clade: Pancrustacea
- Class: Insecta
- Order: Hemiptera
- Suborder: Heteroptera
- Family: Largidae
- Subfamily: Physopeltinae; Hussey, 1929

Genera
- see text

= Physopeltinae =

Subfamily of true bugs

Physopeltinae is a subfamily of insects within the family Largidae, or bordered plant bugs.

== Tribes and genera ==
As of November 2026, Biolib includes three tribes:

Kmentiini Stehlík, 2013

1. Kmentia Stehlík, 2013 (West Africa)

Lohitini Ahmad & Abbas, 1987

1. Macrocheraia Guérin-Ménéville, 1834 (monotypic, synonym Lohita Amyot & Audinet-Serville, 1843)

=== Physopeltini ===
Authority: Hussey, 1929

1. Delacampius Distant, 1903
2. Iphita Stål, 1873
3. Jindraia Stehlík, 2006
4. Physopelta Amyot & Serville, 1843
5. Riegeriana Stehlík & Kment, 2014
6. Taeuberella Schmidt, 1932

Incertae sedis

1. Wachsiella Schmidt, 1931
