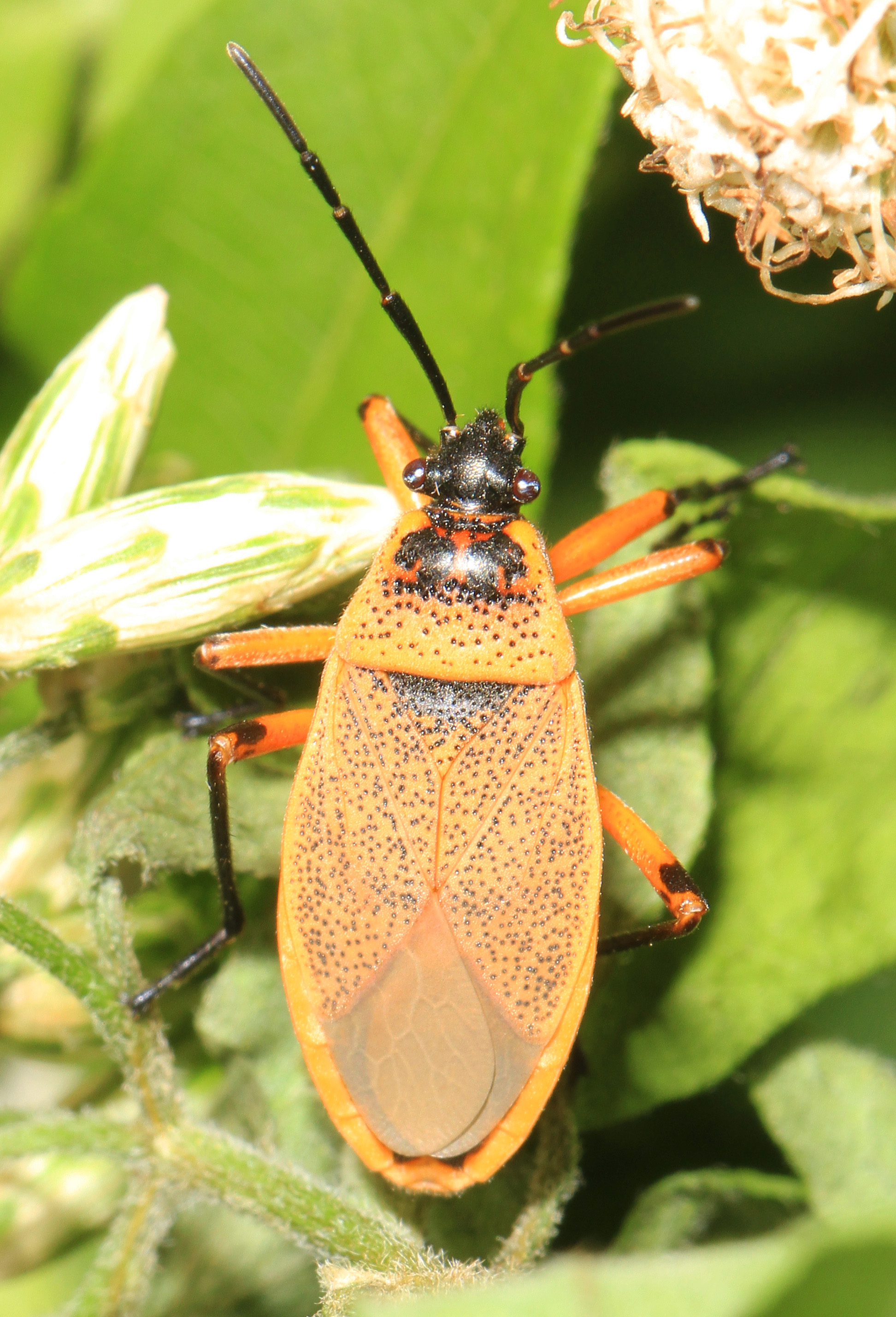
- Largus sp.

Scientific classification
- Kingdom: Animalia
- Phylum: Arthropoda
- Class: Insecta
- Order: Hemiptera
- Suborder: Heteroptera
- Family: Largidae
- Genus: Largus; Hahn, 1831

Species
- See text

Synonyms
- Wupatkius Bliven, 1956

= Largus (bug) =

Genus of true bugs

Largus is a genus of American true bugs in the family Largidae.

== Species ==
Species include:

- Largus bipustulatus Stål 1861
- Largus californicus (Van Duzee, 1923)
- Largus cinctus Herrich-schaeffer, 1842
- Largus convivus Stål 1861
- Largus davisi Barber, 1914
- Largus humilis (Drury, 1782)
- Largus maculatus Schmidt, 1931
- Largus pallidus Halstead, 1972
- Largus sculptilis Bliven, 1959
- Largus sellatus (Guérin-Méneville, 1857)
- Largus semipletus Bliven, 1959
- Largus semipunctatus Halstead, 1970
- Largus succinctus (Linnaeus, 1763)
- Largus trochanterus Schmidt, 1931
