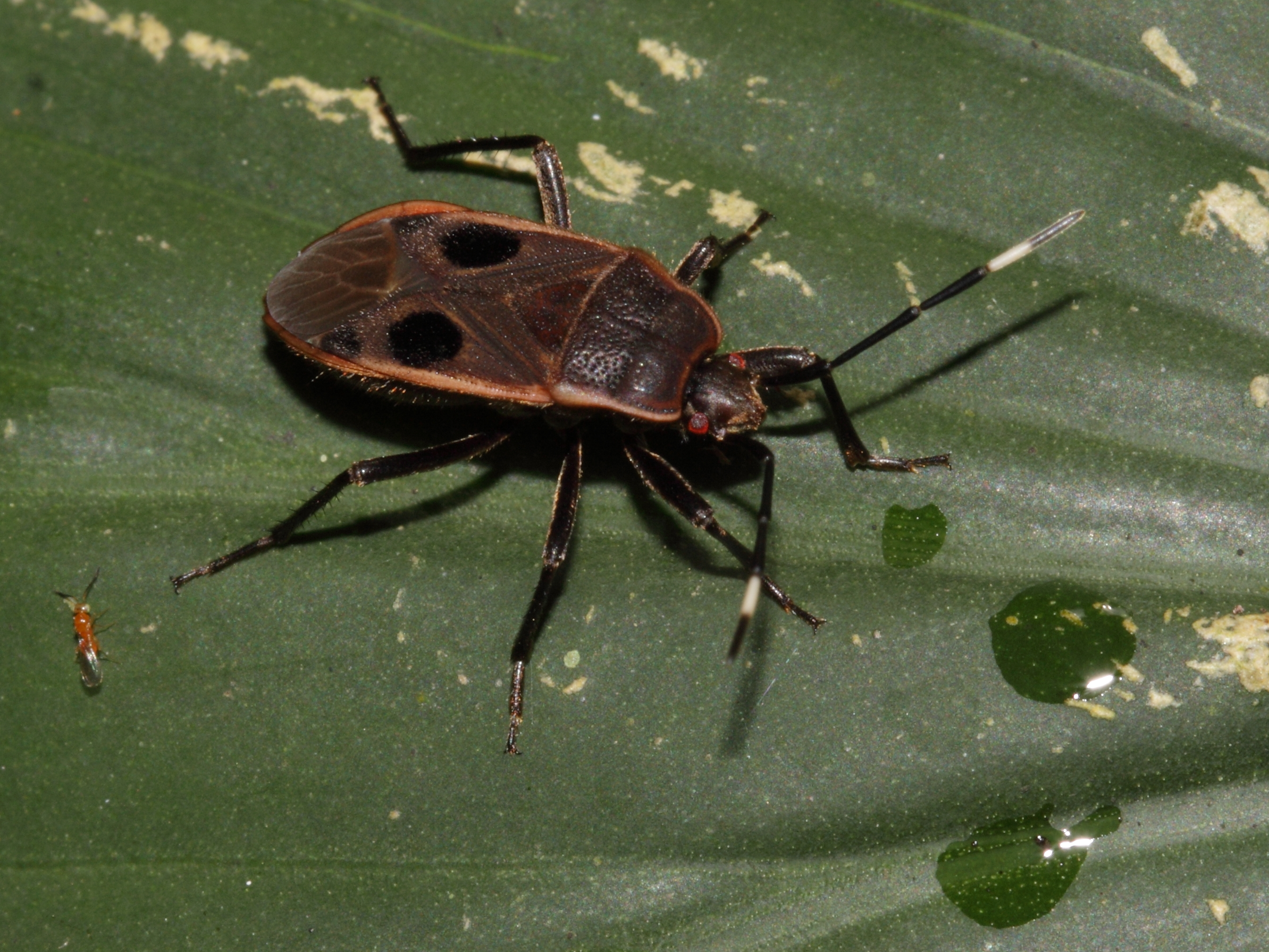
- Physopelta sp.

Scientific classification
- Domain: Eukaryota
- Kingdom: Animalia
- Phylum: Arthropoda
- Class: Insecta
- Order: Hemiptera
- Suborder: Heteroptera
- Infraorder: Pentatomomorpha
- Superfamily: Pyrrhocoroidea
- Family: Largidae; Amyot and Serville, 1843

Subfamilies
- Larginae; Physopeltinae

= Largidae =

Family of true bugs

Largidae is a family of insects within the order Hemiptera. They are commonly known as bordered plant bugs because many have contrasting coloured edges to their hemelytra. There are fifteen genera and about one hundred species. They are mostly wide-bodied, have no ocelli and have a four-segmented rostrum. The bugs in this family are generally ground-dwelling or they scramble around in plants, bushes and trees. They are phytophagous, feeding on plant juices and seeds.

== Subfamilies ==
- Larginae
- Physopeltinae
