= Moechohecyra indica =

Scientific classification
- Kingdom: Animalia
- Phylum: Arthropoda
- Class: Insecta
- Order: Coleoptera
- Suborder: Polyphaga
- Infraorder: Cucujiformia
- Family: Cerambycidae
- Tribe: Crossotini
- Genus: Moechohecyra
- Species: M. indica

Binomial name
- Moechohecyra indica Breuning, 1938

Species of beetle

Moechohecyra indica is a species of beetle in the family Cerambycidae. It was described by Stephan von Breuning in 1938. It is known from India.
