= Epirochroa fasciolata =

Scientific classification
- Kingdom: Animalia
- Phylum: Arthropoda
- Class: Insecta
- Order: Coleoptera
- Suborder: Polyphaga
- Infraorder: Cucujiformia
- Family: Cerambycidae
- Tribe: Crossotini
- Genus: Epirochroa
- Species: E. fasciolata

Binomial name
- Epirochroa fasciolata Fairmaire, 1899

Species of beetle

Epirochroa fasciolata is a species of beetle in the family Cerambycidae native to Madagascar. It was described by Fairmaire in 1899.
