= Corynofrea rubra =

Scientific classification
- Kingdom: Animalia
- Phylum: Arthropoda
- Class: Insecta
- Order: Coleoptera
- Suborder: Polyphaga
- Infraorder: Cucujiformia
- Family: Cerambycidae
- Tribe: Crossotini
- Genus: Corynofrea
- Species: C. rubra

Binomial name
- Corynofrea rubra (Jordan, 1903)

Synonyms
- Corynofrea rubra m. brunnipes Breuning, 1968; Cubilia rubra Jordan, 1903

Species of beetle

Corynofrea rubra is a species of beetle in the family Cerambycidae. It was described by Karl Jordan in 1903. It is known from Cameroon, the Republic of the Congo, and Nigeria.
