= Epirochroa griseovaria =

Scientific classification
- Kingdom: Animalia
- Phylum: Arthropoda
- Class: Insecta
- Order: Coleoptera
- Suborder: Polyphaga
- Infraorder: Cucujiformia
- Family: Cerambycidae
- Tribe: Crossotini
- Genus: Epirochroa
- Species: E. griseovaria

Binomial name
- Epirochroa griseovaria Fairmaire, 1896

Species of beetle

Epirochroa griseovaria is a species of beetle in the family Cerambycidae. It was described by Fairmaire in 1896.

== Subspecies ==
- Epirochroa griseovaria griseovaria Fairmaire, 1896
- Epirochroa griseovaria occidentalis Breuning, 1980
