= Leucographus alluaudi =

Scientific classification
- Kingdom: Animalia
- Phylum: Arthropoda
- Class: Insecta
- Order: Coleoptera
- Suborder: Polyphaga
- Infraorder: Cucujiformia
- Family: Cerambycidae
- Tribe: Crossotini
- Genus: Leucographus
- Species: L. alluaudi

Binomial name
- Leucographus alluaudi Fairmaire, 1897

Species of beetle

Leucographus alluaudi is a species of beetle in the family Cerambycidae. It was described by Fairmaire in 1897.
