= Leucographus albovarius =

Scientific classification
- Kingdom: Animalia
- Phylum: Arthropoda
- Class: Insecta
- Order: Coleoptera
- Suborder: Polyphaga
- Infraorder: Cucujiformia
- Family: Cerambycidae
- Tribe: Crossotini
- Genus: Leucographus
- Species: L. albovarius

Binomial name
- Leucographus albovarius Waterhouse, 1878

Species of beetle

Leucographus albovarius is a species of beetle in the family Cerambycidae. It was described by Waterhouse in 1878.

== Subspecies ==
- Leucographus albovarius albovarius Waterhouse, 1878
- Leucographus albovarius murinus Alluaud, 1900
