= Mycerinus dorcadioides =

Scientific classification
- Kingdom: Animalia
- Phylum: Arthropoda
- Class: Insecta
- Order: Coleoptera
- Suborder: Polyphaga
- Infraorder: Cucujiformia
- Family: Cerambycidae
- Tribe: Crossotini
- Genus: Mycerinus
- Species: M. dorcadioides

Binomial name
- Mycerinus dorcadioides (Audinet-Serville, 1835)

Species of beetle

Mycerinus dorcadioides is a species of beetle in the family Cerambycidae. It was described by Jean Guillaume Audinet-Serville in 1835.
