= Ecyroschema morini =

Scientific classification
- Domain: Eukaryota
- Kingdom: Animalia
- Phylum: Arthropoda
- Class: Insecta
- Order: Coleoptera
- Suborder: Polyphaga
- Infraorder: Cucujiformia
- Family: Cerambycidae
- Tribe: Crossotini
- Genus: Ecyroschema
- Species: E. morini

Binomial name
- Ecyroschema morini Téocchi, Jiroux, Sudre & Ture, 2008

Species of beetle

Ecyroschema morini is a species of beetle in the family Cerambycidae. It was described by Téocchi, Jiroux, Sudre and Ture in 2008. It is known from the Democratic Republic of the Congo, and the Ivory Coast.
