= Freocrossotus reticulatus =

Scientific classification
- Kingdom: Animalia
- Phylum: Arthropoda
- Class: Insecta
- Order: Coleoptera
- Suborder: Polyphaga
- Infraorder: Cucujiformia
- Family: Cerambycidae
- Tribe: Crossotini
- Genus: Freocrossotus
- Species: F. reticulatus

Binomial name
- Freocrossotus reticulatus Breuning, 1964

Species of beetle

Freocrossotus reticulatus is a species of beetle in the family Cerambycidae. It was described by Stephan von Breuning in 1964. It is known from the Gulf of Guinea.
