= Niphecyra papyri =

Scientific classification
- Kingdom: Animalia
- Phylum: Arthropoda
- Class: Insecta
- Order: Coleoptera
- Suborder: Polyphaga
- Infraorder: Cucujiformia
- Family: Cerambycidae
- Tribe: Crossotini
- Genus: Niphecyra
- Species: N. papyri

Binomial name
- Niphecyra papyri Lepesme, 1949

Species of beetle

Niphecyra papyri is a species of beetle in the family Cerambycidae. It was described by Lepesme in 1949.
