= Ranova pictipes =

Scientific classification
- Kingdom: Animalia
- Phylum: Arthropoda
- Class: Insecta
- Order: Coleoptera
- Suborder: Polyphaga
- Infraorder: Cucujiformia
- Family: Cerambycidae
- Tribe: Crossotini
- Genus: Ranova
- Species: R. pictipes

Binomial name
- Ranova pictipes Thomson, 1864

Species of beetle

Ranova pictipes is a species of beetle in the family Cerambycidae. It was described by Thomson in 1864. It is found in Madagascar, and is a light brown colour.
