= Geteuma peraffinis =

Scientific classification
- Kingdom: Animalia
- Phylum: Arthropoda
- Class: Insecta
- Order: Coleoptera
- Suborder: Polyphaga
- Infraorder: Cucujiformia
- Family: Cerambycidae
- Tribe: Crossotini
- Genus: Geteuma
- Species: G. peraffinis

Binomial name
- Geteuma peraffinis Breuning, 1971

Species of beetle

Geteuma peraffinis is a species of beetle in the family Cerambycidae. It was described by Stephan von Breuning in 1971. It is known from Madagascar.
