= Mycerinus brevis =

Scientific classification
- Kingdom: Animalia
- Phylum: Arthropoda
- Class: Insecta
- Order: Coleoptera
- Suborder: Polyphaga
- Infraorder: Cucujiformia
- Family: Cerambycidae
- Tribe: Crossotini
- Genus: Mycerinus
- Species: M. brevis

Binomial name
- Mycerinus brevis Aurivillius, 1914

Species of beetle

Mycerinus brevis is a species of beetle in the family Cerambycidae. It was described by Per Olof Christopher Aurivillius in 1914.
