= Niphecyra rufolineata =

Scientific classification
- Kingdom: Animalia
- Phylum: Arthropoda
- Class: Insecta
- Order: Coleoptera
- Suborder: Polyphaga
- Infraorder: Cucujiformia
- Family: Cerambycidae
- Tribe: Crossotini
- Genus: Niphecyra
- Species: N. rufolineata

Binomial name
- Niphecyra rufolineata (Quedenfeldt, 1888)

Species of beetle

Niphecyra rufolineata is a species of beetle in the family Cerambycidae. It was described by Quedenfeldt in 1888.
