= Mycerinus punctiventris =

Scientific classification
- Kingdom: Animalia
- Phylum: Arthropoda
- Class: Insecta
- Order: Coleoptera
- Suborder: Polyphaga
- Infraorder: Cucujiformia
- Family: Cerambycidae
- Tribe: Crossotini
- Genus: Mycerinus
- Species: M. punctiventris

Binomial name
- Mycerinus punctiventris (Kolbe, 1893)

Synonyms
- Mycerinicus punctiventris Kolbe, 1893

Species of beetle

Mycerinus punctiventris is a species of beetle in the family Cerambycidae. It was described by Kolbe in 1893.
