= Mycerinus subcostatus =

Scientific classification
- Kingdom: Animalia
- Phylum: Arthropoda
- Class: Insecta
- Order: Coleoptera
- Suborder: Polyphaga
- Infraorder: Cucujiformia
- Family: Cerambycidae
- Tribe: Crossotini
- Genus: Mycerinus
- Species: M. subcostatus

Binomial name
- Mycerinus subcostatus (Kolbe, 1894)

Species of beetle

Mycerinus subcostatus is a species of beetle in the family Cerambycidae. It was described by Kolbe in 1894.
