= Apodasya pilosa =

Scientific classification
- Domain: Eukaryota
- Kingdom: Animalia
- Phylum: Arthropoda
- Class: Insecta
- Order: Coleoptera
- Suborder: Polyphaga
- Infraorder: Cucujiformia
- Family: Cerambycidae
- Subfamily: Lamiinae
- Tribe: Crossotini
- Genus: Apodasya
- Species: A. pilosa

Binomial name
- Apodasya pilosa (Chevrolat, 1843)

Synonyms
- Chaetosoma pilosum Chevrolat, 1843; Apodasya pilosa Pascoe, 1863

Species of beetles

Apodasya pilosa is a species of beetle in the family Cerambycidae, described by Chevrolat in 1843. The species was renamed by Pascoe in 1863 when he replaced the genus name, but Pascoe's usage has been declared a junior subjective synonym under the ICZN, and the authority remains with Chevrolat.
