= Ecyroschema favosum =

Scientific classification
- Domain: Eukaryota
- Kingdom: Animalia
- Phylum: Arthropoda
- Class: Insecta
- Order: Coleoptera
- Suborder: Polyphaga
- Infraorder: Cucujiformia
- Family: Cerambycidae
- Tribe: Crossotini
- Genus: Ecyroschema
- Species: E. favosum

Binomial name
- Ecyroschema favosum Thomson, 1864

Synonyms
- Ecyroschema tuberculicolle Breuning, 1956; Ecyroschema favosa Auctorum (misspelling)

Species of beetle

Ecyroschema favosum is a species of beetle in the family Cerambycidae. It was described by Thomson in 1864. It is known from South Africa, the Ivory Coast, the Democratic Republic of the Congo, Tanzania, Namibia, Uganda, Sudan, and Zimbabwe. It feeds on Acacia. It contains the varietas Ecyroschema favosum var. rhodesianum.
