= Phanis armicollis =

Scientific classification
- Kingdom: Animalia
- Phylum: Arthropoda
- Class: Insecta
- Order: Coleoptera
- Suborder: Polyphaga
- Infraorder: Cucujiformia
- Family: Cerambycidae
- Tribe: Crossotini
- Genus: Phanis
- Species: P. armicollis

Binomial name
- Phanis armicollis Fairmaire, 1893

Synonyms
- Monoxenus bifasciculatus Breuning, 1971

Species of beetle

Phanis armicollis is a species of beetle in the family Cerambycidae. It was described by Fairmaire in 1893.
