= Corynofrea nigritarsis =

Scientific classification
- Kingdom: Animalia
- Phylum: Arthropoda
- Class: Insecta
- Order: Coleoptera
- Suborder: Polyphaga
- Infraorder: Cucujiformia
- Family: Cerambycidae
- Tribe: Crossotini
- Genus: Corynofrea
- Species: C. nigritarsis

Binomial name
- Corynofrea nigritarsis Breuning, 1940

Species of beetle

Corynofrea nigritarsis is a species of beetle in the family Cerambycidae. It was described by Breuning in 1940.

== Subspecies ==
- Corynofrea nigritarsis nigripes Breuning, 1977
- Corynofrea nigritarsis nigritarsis Breuning, 1940
