= Phanis tanganjicae =

Scientific classification
- Kingdom: Animalia
- Phylum: Arthropoda
- Class: Insecta
- Order: Coleoptera
- Suborder: Polyphaga
- Infraorder: Cucujiformia
- Family: Cerambycidae
- Tribe: Crossotini
- Genus: Phanis
- Species: P. tanganjicae

Binomial name
- Phanis tanganjicae Breuning, 1978

Species of beetle

Phanis tanganjicae is a species of beetle in the family Cerambycidae. It was described by Stephan von Breuning in 1978.
