= Corynofrea mirabilis =

Scientific classification
- Kingdom: Animalia
- Phylum: Arthropoda
- Class: Insecta
- Order: Coleoptera
- Suborder: Polyphaga
- Infraorder: Cucujiformia
- Family: Cerambycidae
- Tribe: Crossotini
- Genus: Corynofrea
- Species: C. mirabilis

Binomial name
- Corynofrea mirabilis Aurivillius, 1910

Species of beetle

Corynofrea mirabilis is a species of beetle in the family Cerambycidae. It was described by Per Olof Christopher Aurivillius in 1910 and is known from the Republic of the Congo.
