= Cincinnata allardi =

Scientific classification
- Kingdom: Animalia
- Phylum: Arthropoda
- Class: Insecta
- Order: Coleoptera
- Suborder: Polyphaga
- Infraorder: Cucujiformia
- Family: Cerambycidae
- Tribe: Crossotini
- Genus: Cincinnata
- Species: C. allardi

Binomial name
- Cincinnata allardi Breuning, 1966

Species of beetle

Cincinnata allardi is a species of beetle in the family Cerambycidae. It was described by Breuning in 1966.
