= Mycerinus multilineatus =

Scientific classification
- Kingdom: Animalia
- Phylum: Arthropoda
- Class: Insecta
- Order: Coleoptera
- Suborder: Polyphaga
- Infraorder: Cucujiformia
- Family: Cerambycidae
- Tribe: Crossotini
- Genus: Mycerinus
- Species: M. multilineatus

Binomial name
- Mycerinus multilineatus Breuning, 1936

Species of beetle

Mycerinus multilineatus is a species of beetle in the family Cerambycidae. It was described by Stephan von Breuning in 1936.
