= Ecyroschema tuberculatum =

Scientific classification
- Kingdom: Animalia
- Phylum: Arthropoda
- Class: Insecta
- Order: Coleoptera
- Suborder: Polyphaga
- Infraorder: Cucujiformia
- Family: Cerambycidae
- Tribe: Crossotini
- Genus: Ecyroschema
- Species: E. tuberculatum

Binomial name
- Ecyroschema tuberculatum Breuning, 1948

Synonyms
- Ecyroschema tuberculata Breuning, 1948 (misspelling)

Species of beetle

Ecyroschema tuberculatum is a species of beetle in the family Cerambycidae. It was described by Stephan von Breuning in 1948. It is known from Nigeria, Somalia, and Togo.

== Subspecies ==
- Ecyroschema tuberculatum hecphora Téocchi, 1988
- Ecyroschema tuberculatum tuberculatum Breuning, 1948
