= Epirochroa fairmairei =

Scientific classification
- Kingdom: Animalia
- Phylum: Arthropoda
- Class: Insecta
- Order: Coleoptera
- Suborder: Polyphaga
- Infraorder: Cucujiformia
- Family: Cerambycidae
- Tribe: Crossotini
- Genus: Epirochroa
- Species: E. fairmairei

Binomial name
- Epirochroa fairmairei Lepesme & Villiers, 1944

Species of beetle

Epirochroa fairmairei is a species of beetle in the family Cerambycidae. It was described by Lepesme and Villiers in 1944.
