= Cincinnata schoutedeni =

Scientific classification
- Kingdom: Animalia
- Phylum: Arthropoda
- Class: Insecta
- Order: Coleoptera
- Suborder: Polyphaga
- Infraorder: Cucujiformia
- Family: Cerambycidae
- Tribe: Crossotini
- Genus: Cincinnata
- Species: C. schoutedeni

Binomial name
- Cincinnata schoutedeni Breuning, 1935

Species of beetle

Cincinnata schoutedeni is a species of beetle in the family Cerambycidae. It was described by Breuning in 1935. It is known from the Democratic Republic of the Congo.
