= Geteuma quadriguttata =

Scientific classification
- Domain: Eukaryota
- Kingdom: Animalia
- Phylum: Arthropoda
- Class: Insecta
- Order: Coleoptera
- Suborder: Polyphaga
- Infraorder: Cucujiformia
- Family: Cerambycidae
- Tribe: Crossotini
- Genus: Geteuma
- Species: G. quadriguttata

Binomial name
- Geteuma quadriguttata Coquerel, 1852

Synonyms
- Phymasterna quadriguttata Coquerel, 1852

Species of beetle

Geteuma quadriguttata is a species of beetle in the family Cerambycidae. It was described by Charles Coquerel in 1852. It is known from Madagascar.
