= Epirochroa albicollis =

Scientific classification
- Kingdom: Animalia
- Phylum: Arthropoda
- Class: Insecta
- Order: Coleoptera
- Suborder: Polyphaga
- Infraorder: Cucujiformia
- Family: Cerambycidae
- Tribe: Crossotini
- Genus: Epirochroa
- Species: E. albicollis

Binomial name
- Epirochroa albicollis (Fairmaire, 1897)

Synonyms
- Lasiocercis albicollis Fairmaire, 1897; Paralasiocercis albicollis (Fairmaire) Breuning, 1942

Species of beetle

Epirochroa albicollis is a species of beetle in the family Cerambycidae. It was described by Fairmaire in 1897.
