= Ranova lineigera =

Scientific classification
- Kingdom: Animalia
- Phylum: Arthropoda
- Class: Insecta
- Order: Coleoptera
- Suborder: Polyphaga
- Infraorder: Cucujiformia
- Family: Cerambycidae
- Tribe: Crossotini
- Genus: Ranova
- Species: R. lineigera

Binomial name
- Ranova lineigera Fairmaire, 1889

Species of beetle

Ranova lineigera is a species of beetle in the family Cerambycidae. It was described by Fairmaire in 1889.
