= Corynofrea camerunica =

Scientific classification
- Kingdom: Animalia
- Phylum: Arthropoda
- Class: Insecta
- Order: Coleoptera
- Suborder: Polyphaga
- Infraorder: Cucujiformia
- Family: Cerambycidae
- Tribe: Crossotini
- Genus: Corynofrea
- Species: C. camerunica

Binomial name
- Corynofrea camerunica Breuning, 1950

Species of beetle

Corynofrea camerunica is a species of beetle in the family Cerambycidae. It was described by Breuning in 1950. It is known from Cameroon.
