= Ecyroschema rugatum =

Scientific classification
- Domain: Eukaryota
- Kingdom: Animalia
- Phylum: Arthropoda
- Class: Insecta
- Order: Coleoptera
- Suborder: Polyphaga
- Infraorder: Cucujiformia
- Family: Cerambycidae
- Tribe: Crossotini
- Genus: Ecyroschema
- Species: E. rugatum

Binomial name
- Ecyroschema rugatum Pascoe, 1888

Species of beetle

Ecyroschema rugatum is a species of beetle in the family Cerambycidae. It was described by Pascoe in 1888. It is known from South Africa.
