= Mycerinus =

Mycerinus may refer to:

- Mycerinus (beetle), a genus of longhorn beetles
- Mycerinus (plant), a genus of Ericaceae
- The Greek name of the Egyptian pharaoh Menkaure
