= Lagrida aenea =

Scientific classification
- Kingdom: Animalia
- Phylum: Arthropoda
- Class: Insecta
- Order: Coleoptera
- Suborder: Polyphaga
- Infraorder: Cucujiformia
- Family: Cerambycidae
- Tribe: Crossotini
- Genus: Lagrida
- Species: L. aenea

Binomial name
- Lagrida aenea Hintz, 1919

Synonyms
- Lagrida similis Breuning, 1938

Species of beetle

Lagrida aenea is a species of beetle in the family Cerambycidae. It was described by Hintz in 1919. It is known from Gabon, Cameroon, Equatorial Guinea, the Democratic Republic of the Congo, and Uganda. It feeds on plants such as Triplochiton scleroxylon, Petersianthus macrocarpus, Anonidium mannii, and Anthonotha macrophylla.

== Varietas ==
- Lagrida aenea var. flavescens Breuning, 1939
- Lagrida aenea var. ruficollis Breuning, 1939
