= Moechohecyra arctifera =

Scientific classification
- Kingdom: Animalia
- Phylum: Arthropoda
- Class: Insecta
- Order: Coleoptera
- Suborder: Polyphaga
- Infraorder: Cucujiformia
- Family: Cerambycidae
- Tribe: Crossotini
- Genus: Moechohecyra
- Species: M. arctifera

Binomial name
- Moechohecyra arctifera Wang & Chiang, 2002

Species of beetle

Moechohecyra arctifera is a species of beetle in the family Cerambycidae. It was described by Wang and Chiang in 2002. It is known from China.
