= Moechohecyra sumatrana =

Scientific classification
- Kingdom: Animalia
- Phylum: Arthropoda
- Class: Insecta
- Order: Coleoptera
- Suborder: Polyphaga
- Infraorder: Cucujiformia
- Family: Cerambycidae
- Tribe: Crossotini
- Genus: Moechohecyra
- Species: M. sumatrana

Binomial name
- Moechohecyra sumatrana Breuning, 1956

Species of beetle

Moechohecyra sumatrana is a species of beetle in the family Cerambycidae. It was described by Stephan von Breuning in 1956. It is known from Sumatra.
