= Freocrossotus maynei =

Scientific classification
- Kingdom: Animalia
- Phylum: Arthropoda
- Class: Insecta
- Order: Coleoptera
- Suborder: Polyphaga
- Infraorder: Cucujiformia
- Family: Cerambycidae
- Tribe: Crossotini
- Genus: Freocrossotus
- Species: F. maynei

Binomial name
- Freocrossotus maynei Lepesme & Breuning, 1956

Synonyms
- Freocrossotus kivuensis Breuning, 1965; Mimotambusa mabokensis Breuning & Teocchi, 1973

Species of beetle

Freocrossotus maynei is a species of beetle in the family Cerambycidae. It was described by Lepesme and Breuning in 1956.
