= Mycerinus limbatus =

Scientific classification
- Kingdom: Animalia
- Phylum: Arthropoda
- Class: Insecta
- Order: Coleoptera
- Suborder: Polyphaga
- Infraorder: Cucujiformia
- Family: Cerambycidae
- Tribe: Crossotini
- Genus: Mycerinus
- Species: M. limbatus

Binomial name
- Mycerinus limbatus Kolbe, 1894

Species of beetle

Mycerinus limbatus is a species of beetle in the family Cerambycidae. It was described by Kolbe in 1894.
