= Epidichostates strandi =

Scientific classification
- Kingdom: Animalia
- Phylum: Arthropoda
- Class: Insecta
- Order: Coleoptera
- Suborder: Polyphaga
- Infraorder: Cucujiformia
- Family: Cerambycidae
- Tribe: Crossotini
- Genus: Epidichostates
- Species: E. strandi

Binomial name
- Epidichostates strandi (Breuning, 1935)

Synonyms
- Crossotus sassensis Breuning, 1935; Crossotus strandi Breuning, 1935

Species of beetle

Epidichostates strandi is a species of longhorn beetle in the subfamily Lamiinae. It was described by Stephan von Breuning in 1935. It is known from Benin, the Ivory Coast, Gabon, Ghana, Cameroon, Guinea, the Democratic Republic of the Congo, and Sierra Leone.

== Subspecies ==
- Epidichostates strandi jadoti Téocchi, 2001
- Epidichostates strandi strandi (Breuning, 1935)
