= Pseudocrossotus albomaculatus =

Scientific classification
- Kingdom: Animalia
- Phylum: Arthropoda
- Class: Insecta
- Order: Coleoptera
- Suborder: Polyphaga
- Infraorder: Cucujiformia
- Family: Cerambycidae
- Tribe: Crossotini
- Genus: Pseudocrossotus
- Species: P. albomaculatus

Binomial name
- Pseudocrossotus albomaculatus (Breuning, 1938)

Synonyms
- Biobessoides albomaculatus (Breuning) Teocchi, 1991; Crossotus albomaculatus Breuning, 1938; Crossotus plurifasciculatoides Breuning, 1981; Pseudocrossotus strydomi Breuning, 1981

Species of beetle

Pseudocrossotus albomaculatus is a species of beetle in the family Cerambycidae. It was described by Stephan von Breuning in 1938. It is known from Botswana, Angola, South Africa, Namibia, Tanzania, and Somalia.
