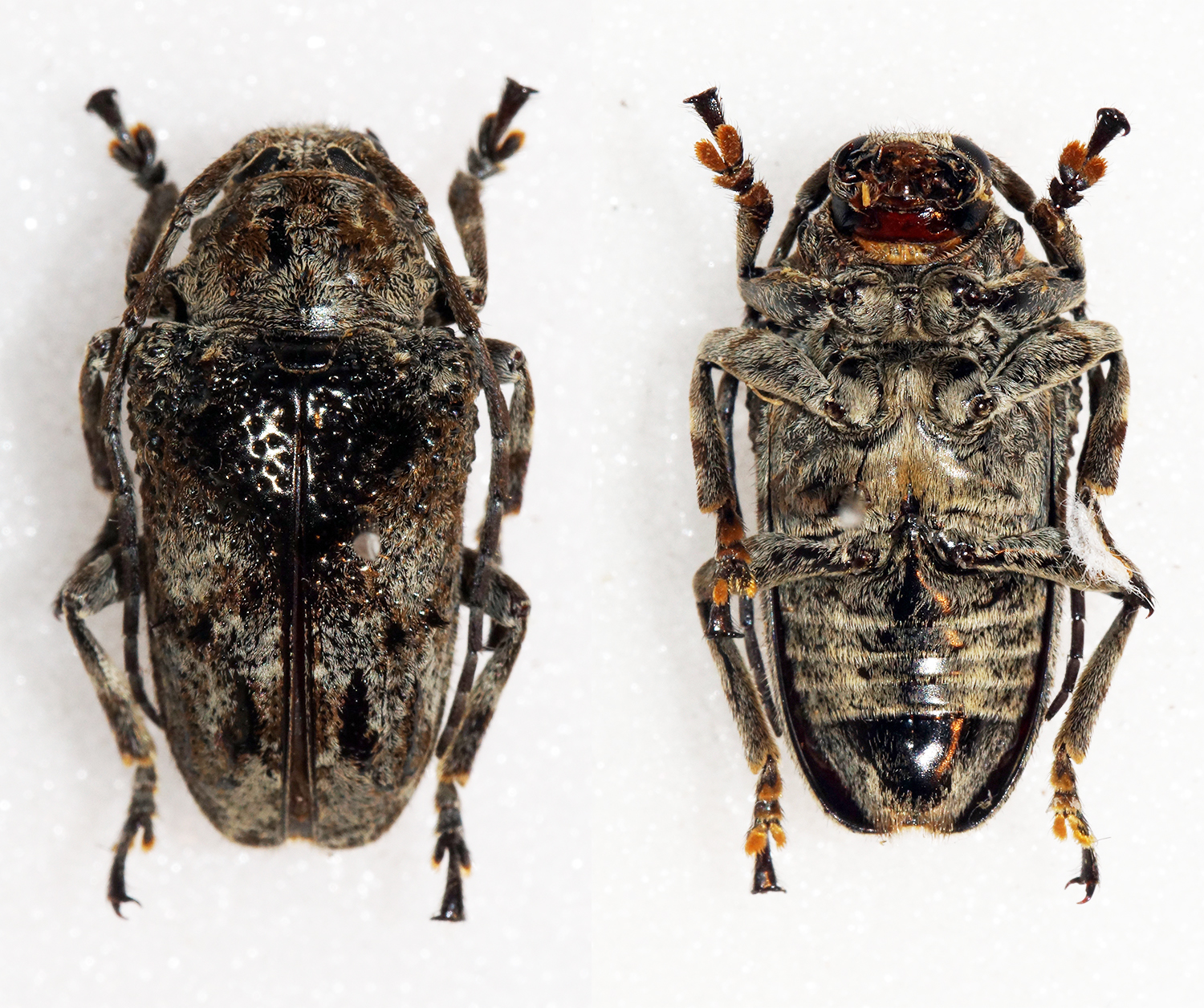

Scientific classification
- Domain: Eukaryota
- Kingdom: Animalia
- Phylum: Arthropoda
- Class: Insecta
- Order: Coleoptera
- Suborder: Polyphaga
- Infraorder: Cucujiformia
- Family: Cerambycidae
- Tribe: Crossotini
- Genus: Epidichostates
- Species: E. molossus

Binomial name
- Epidichostates molossus (Duvivier, 1892)

Synonyms
- Crossotus cristatus Jordan, 1894; Crossotus molossus (Duvivier) Breuning, 1942; Dichostates molossus Duvivier, 1892

= Epidichostates molossus =

Species of beetle

Epidichostates molossus is a species of beetle in the family Cerambycidae. It was described by Duvivier in 1892.
