= Trachyliopus multifasciculatus =

Scientific classification
- Kingdom: Animalia
- Phylum: Arthropoda
- Class: Insecta
- Order: Coleoptera
- Suborder: Polyphaga
- Infraorder: Cucujiformia
- Family: Cerambycidae
- Tribe: Crossotini
- Genus: Trachyliopus
- Species: T. multifasciculatus

Binomial name
- Trachyliopus multifasciculatus Breuning, 1940

Species of beetle

Trachyliopus multifasciculatus is a species of beetle in the family Cerambycidae. It was described by Austrian entomologist Stephan von Breuning in 1940.
