= Trachyliopus androyensis =

Scientific classification
- Kingdom: Animalia
- Phylum: Arthropoda
- Class: Insecta
- Order: Coleoptera
- Suborder: Polyphaga
- Infraorder: Cucujiformia
- Family: Cerambycidae
- Tribe: Crossotini
- Genus: Trachyliopus
- Species: T. androyensis

Binomial name
- Trachyliopus androyensis Breuning, 1957

Species of beetle

Trachyliopus androyensis is a species of beetle in the family Cerambycidae. It was described by Stephan von Breuning in 1957.
