= Mimocrossotus rhodesianus =

Scientific classification
- Kingdom: Animalia
- Phylum: Arthropoda
- Class: Insecta
- Order: Coleoptera
- Suborder: Polyphaga
- Infraorder: Cucujiformia
- Family: Cerambycidae
- Tribe: Crossotini
- Genus: Mimocrossotus
- Species: M. rhodesianus

Binomial name
- Mimocrossotus rhodesianus Breuning, 1972

Synonyms
- Oaratlepolema forchhammeri Breuning, 1986

Species of beetle

Mimocrossotus rhodesianus is a species of beetle in the family Cerambycidae. It was described by Stephan von Breuning in 1972.
