= Ecyroschema zanzibaricum =

Scientific classification
- Kingdom: Animalia
- Phylum: Arthropoda
- Class: Insecta
- Order: Coleoptera
- Suborder: Polyphaga
- Infraorder: Cucujiformia
- Family: Cerambycidae
- Tribe: Crossotini
- Genus: Ecyroschema
- Species: E. zanzibaricum

Binomial name
- Ecyroschema zanzibaricum Adlbauer, Sudre & Téocchi, 2007

Synonyms
- Ecyroschema zanzibarica Adlbauer, Sudre & Téocchi, 2007 (misspelling)

Species of beetle

Ecyroschema zanzibaricum is a species of beetle in the family Cerambycidae. It was described by Adlbauer, Sudre and Téocchi in 2007. It is known from Tanzania.
