= Biasmia guttata =

Scientific classification
- Kingdom: Animalia
- Phylum: Arthropoda
- Class: Insecta
- Order: Coleoptera
- Suborder: Polyphaga
- Infraorder: Cucujiformia
- Family: Cerambycidae
- Tribe: Crossotini
- Genus: Biasmia
- Species: B. guttata

Binomial name
- Biasmia guttata Pascoe, 1864

Synonyms
- Apodasya cleroides Thomson, 1868

Species of beetle

Biasmia guttata is a species of beetle in the family Cerambycidae. It was described by Pascoe in 1864. It is known from South Africa.
