= Trachyliopus fuscosignatus =

Scientific classification
- Kingdom: Animalia
- Phylum: Arthropoda
- Class: Insecta
- Order: Coleoptera
- Suborder: Polyphaga
- Infraorder: Cucujiformia
- Family: Cerambycidae
- Tribe: Crossotini
- Genus: Trachyliopus
- Species: T. fuscosignatus

Binomial name
- Trachyliopus fuscosignatus (Fairmaire, 1886)

Synonyms
- Trachyliopus fuscosignatipennis Breuning, 1972

Species of beetle

Trachyliopus fuscosignatus is a species of beetle in the family Cerambycidae. It was described by Fairmaire in 1886.
