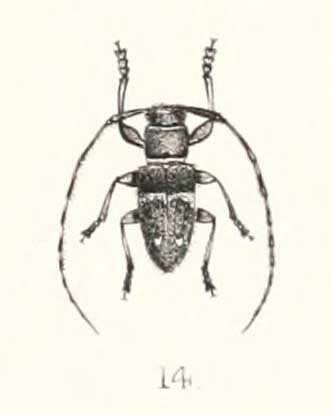

Scientific classification
- Kingdom: Animalia
- Phylum: Arthropoda
- Class: Insecta
- Order: Coleoptera
- Suborder: Polyphaga
- Infraorder: Cucujiformia
- Family: Cerambycidae
- Tribe: Crossotini
- Genus: Cincinnata
- Species: C. fasciata

Binomial name
- Cincinnata fasciata Jordan, 1894

= Cincinnata fasciata =

Species of beetle

Cincinnata fasciata is a species of beetle in the family Cerambycidae. It was described by Karl Jordan in 1894. It is known from the Democratic Republic of the Congo, Cameroon, and Gabon.

== Varieties ==
- Cincinnata fasciata var. infasciata Breuning, 1942
- Cincinnata fasciata var. leucothorax Breuning, 1942
