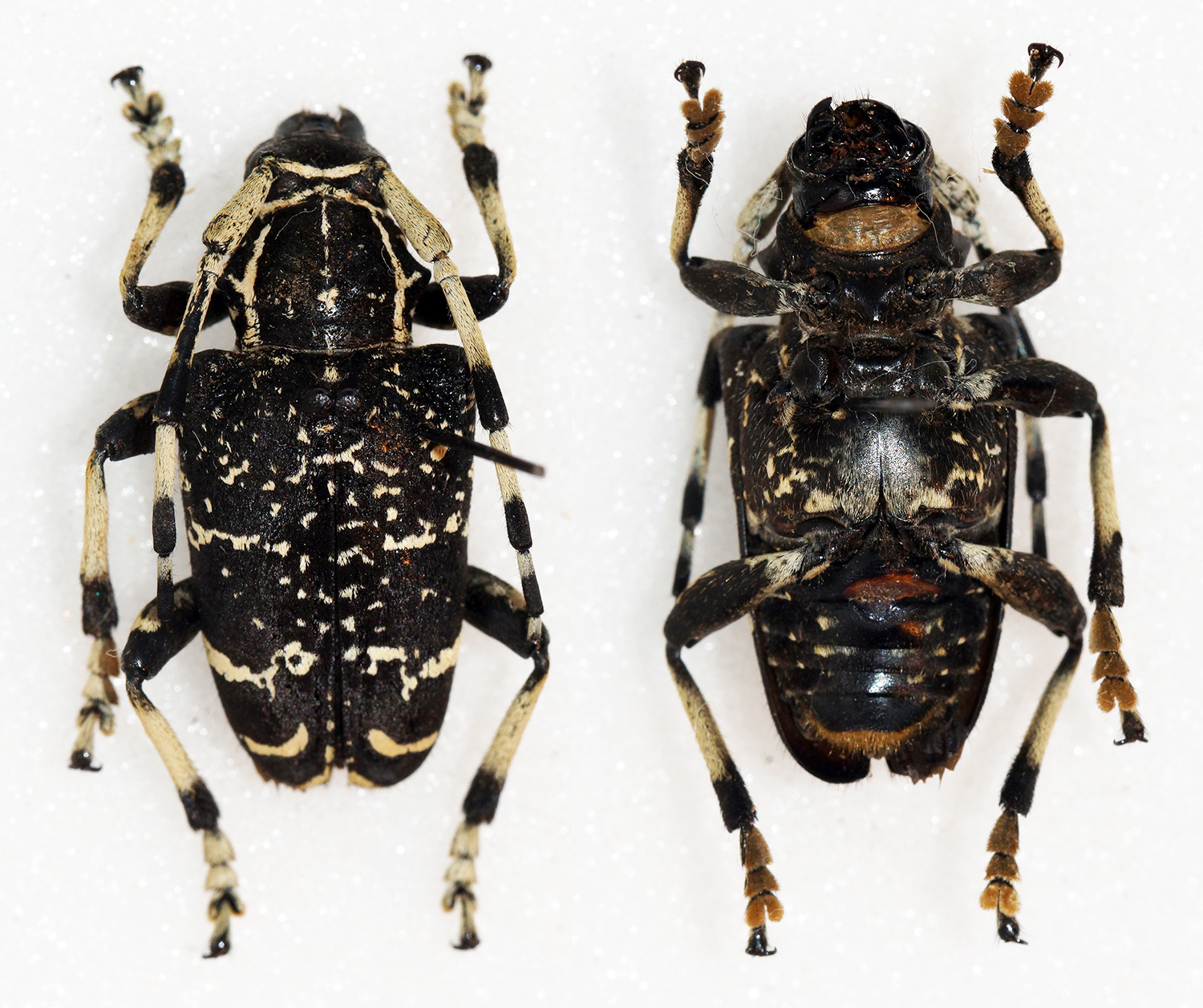
- Sex: Female, Size: 20mm

Scientific classification
- Kingdom: Animalia
- Phylum: Arthropoda
- Class: Insecta
- Order: Coleoptera
- Suborder: Polyphaga
- Infraorder: Cucujiformia
- Family: Cerambycidae
- Tribe: Crossotini
- Genus: Leucographus
- Species: L. variegatus

Binomial name
- Leucographus variegatus Waterhouse, 1878

= Leucographus variegatus =

Species of beetle

Leucographus variegatus is a species of beetle in the family Cerambycidae. It was described by Waterhouse in 1878.

== Subspecies ==
- Leucographus variegatus nigropictus Fairmaire, 1886
- Leucographus variegatus pyramidalis (Fairmaire, 1883)
- Leucographus variegatus sparsevariegatus Breuning, 1957
- Leucographus variegatus variegatus Waterhouse, 1878
