= Moechohecyra verrucicollis =

Scientific classification
- Kingdom: Animalia
- Phylum: Arthropoda
- Class: Insecta
- Order: Coleoptera
- Suborder: Polyphaga
- Infraorder: Cucujiformia
- Family: Cerambycidae
- Tribe: Crossotini
- Genus: Moechohecyra
- Species: M. verrucicollis

Binomial name
- Moechohecyra verrucicollis (Gahan, 1895)

Species of beetle

Moechohecyra verrucicollis is a species of beetle in the family Cerambycidae. It was described by Gahan in 1895. It is known in Myanmar, Laos, India, Sri Lanka and Vietnam.
