= Ecyroschema multituberculatum =

Scientific classification
- Kingdom: Animalia
- Phylum: Arthropoda
- Class: Insecta
- Order: Coleoptera
- Suborder: Polyphaga
- Infraorder: Cucujiformia
- Family: Cerambycidae
- Tribe: Crossotini
- Genus: Ecyroschema
- Species: E. multituberculatum

Binomial name
- Ecyroschema multituberculatum Breuning, 1942

Species of beetle

Ecyroschema multituberculatum is a species of beetle in the family Cerambycidae. It was described by Stephan von Breuning in 1942. It is known from South Africa.
