= Epirochroa cervinocincta =

Scientific classification
- Kingdom: Animalia
- Phylum: Arthropoda
- Class: Insecta
- Order: Coleoptera
- Suborder: Polyphaga
- Infraorder: Cucujiformia
- Family: Cerambycidae
- Tribe: Crossotini
- Genus: Epirochroa
- Species: E. cervinocincta

Binomial name
- Epirochroa cervinocincta Fairmaire, 1899

Species of beetle

Epirochroa cervinocincta is a species of beetle in the family Cerambycidae. It was described by Fairmaire in 1899.
