= Trachyliopus subannulicornis =

Scientific classification
- Kingdom: Animalia
- Phylum: Arthropoda
- Class: Insecta
- Order: Coleoptera
- Suborder: Polyphaga
- Infraorder: Cucujiformia
- Family: Cerambycidae
- Tribe: Crossotini
- Genus: Trachyliopus
- Species: T. subannulicornis

Binomial name
- Trachyliopus subannulicornis Breuning, 1970

Species of beetle

Trachyliopus subannulicornis is a species of beetle in the family Cerambycidae. It was described by Stephan von Breuning in 1970.
