= Paracorus praecox =

Scientific classification
- Kingdom: Animalia
- Phylum: Arthropoda
- Class: Insecta
- Order: Coleoptera
- Suborder: Polyphaga
- Infraorder: Cucujiformia
- Family: Cerambycidae
- Tribe: Crossotini
- Genus: Paracorus
- Species: P. praecox

Binomial name
- Paracorus praecox Kolbe, 1894

Species of beetle

Paracorus praecox is a species of beetle in the family Cerambycidae. It was described by Kolbe in 1894.
