= Phani =

Phani means a serpent in Sanskrit language. It may refer to:

- Phani Majumdar, Indian director
- Phani Ramachandra, Indian film and television director
- Phani Sarma, Assamese actor and director
- Phanis, a species of beetle
