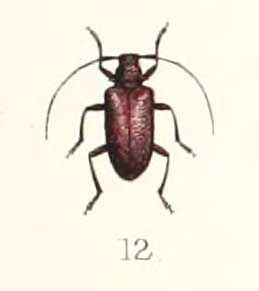

Scientific classification
- Kingdom: Animalia
- Phylum: Arthropoda
- Class: Insecta
- Order: Coleoptera
- Suborder: Polyphaga
- Infraorder: Cucujiformia
- Family: Cerambycidae
- Tribe: Crossotini
- Genus: Lagrida
- Species: L. rufa

Binomial name
- Lagrida rufa Jordan, 1894

Synonyms
- Lagrida rufa m. nigripennis Breuning, 1968

= Lagrida rufa =

Species of beetle

Lagrida rufa is a species of beetle in the family Cerambycidae. It was described by Karl Jordan in 1894. It is known from Cameroon, Ghana, the Republic of the Congo, and the Democratic Republic of the Congo.
