= Pseudocrossotus pujoli =

Scientific classification
- Kingdom: Animalia
- Phylum: Arthropoda
- Class: Insecta
- Order: Coleoptera
- Suborder: Polyphaga
- Infraorder: Cucujiformia
- Family: Cerambycidae
- Tribe: Crossotini
- Genus: Pseudocrossotus
- Species: P. pujoli

Binomial name
- Pseudocrossotus pujoli (Teocchi, 1991)

Synonyms
- Biobessoides pujoli Teocchi, 1991; Biobessoides pujoli m. claricollis Teocchi, 1991

Species of beetle

Pseudocrossotus pujoli is a species of beetle in the family Cerambycidae. It was described by Teocchi in 1991. It is known from Kenya, Somalia.
