= Biasmia antennalis =

Scientific classification
- Kingdom: Animalia
- Phylum: Arthropoda
- Class: Insecta
- Order: Coleoptera
- Suborder: Polyphaga
- Infraorder: Cucujiformia
- Family: Cerambycidae
- Tribe: Crossotini
- Genus: Biasmia
- Species: B. antennalis

Binomial name
- Biasmia antennalis Hunt & Breuning, 1957

Species of beetle

Biasmia antennalis is a species of beetle in the family Cerambycidae. It was described by Hunt and Breuning in 1957. It is known from South Africa and Zimbabwe.
