= Biobessa albopunctata =

Scientific classification
- Kingdom: Animalia
- Phylum: Arthropoda
- Class: Insecta
- Order: Coleoptera
- Suborder: Polyphaga
- Infraorder: Cucujiformia
- Family: Cerambycidae
- Tribe: Crossotini
- Genus: Biobessa
- Species: B. albopunctata

Binomial name
- Biobessa albopunctata Breuning, 1935

Species of beetle

Biobessa albopunctata is a species of beetle in the family Cerambycidae. It was described by Breuning in 1935.
