= Trachyliopus forticornis =

Scientific classification
- Kingdom: Animalia
- Phylum: Arthropoda
- Class: Insecta
- Order: Coleoptera
- Suborder: Polyphaga
- Infraorder: Cucujiformia
- Family: Cerambycidae
- Tribe: Crossotini
- Genus: Trachyliopus
- Species: T. forticornis

Binomial name
- Trachyliopus forticornis (Fairmaire, 1901)

Species of beetle

Trachyliopus forticornis is a species of beetle in the family Cerambycidae. It was described by Fairmaire in 1901.
