= Ranova similis =

Scientific classification
- Kingdom: Animalia
- Phylum: Arthropoda
- Class: Insecta
- Order: Coleoptera
- Suborder: Polyphaga
- Infraorder: Cucujiformia
- Family: Cerambycidae
- Tribe: Crossotini
- Genus: Ranova
- Species: R. similis

Binomial name
- Ranova similis Breuning, 1953

Species of beetle

Ranova similis is a species of beetle in the family Cerambycidae. It was described by Stephan von Breuning in 1953.
