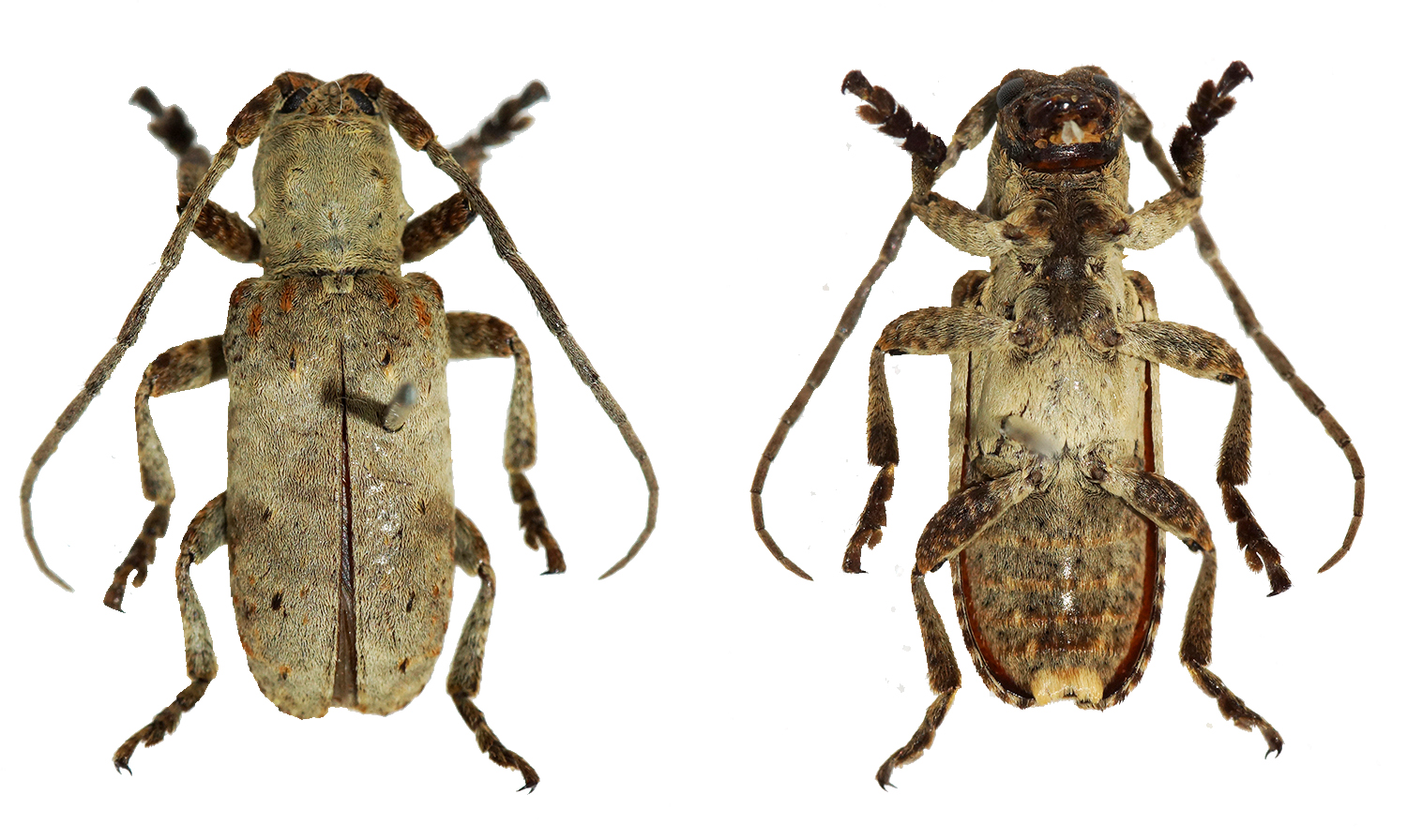

Scientific classification
- Kingdom: Animalia
- Phylum: Arthropoda
- Class: Insecta
- Order: Coleoptera
- Suborder: Polyphaga
- Infraorder: Cucujiformia
- Family: Cerambycidae
- Tribe: Crossotini
- Genus: Biobessa
- Species: B. beatrix

Binomial name
- Biobessa beatrix Gahan, 1898

Synonyms
- Corus nigrociliatus Breuning, 1940

= Biobessa beatrix =

Species of beetle

Biobessa beatrix is a species of beetle in the family Cerambycidae. It was described by Gahan in 1898. It is known from Kenya, Ethiopia, Tanzania and Somalia.
