= Biobessa holzschuhi =

Scientific classification
- Kingdom: Animalia
- Phylum: Arthropoda
- Class: Insecta
- Order: Coleoptera
- Suborder: Polyphaga
- Infraorder: Cucujiformia
- Family: Cerambycidae
- Tribe: Crossotini
- Genus: Biobessa
- Species: B. holzschuhi

Binomial name
- Biobessa holzschuhi Téocchi, 1991

Species of beetle

Biobessa holzschuhi is a species of beetle in the family Cerambycidae. It was described by Téocchi in 1991.
