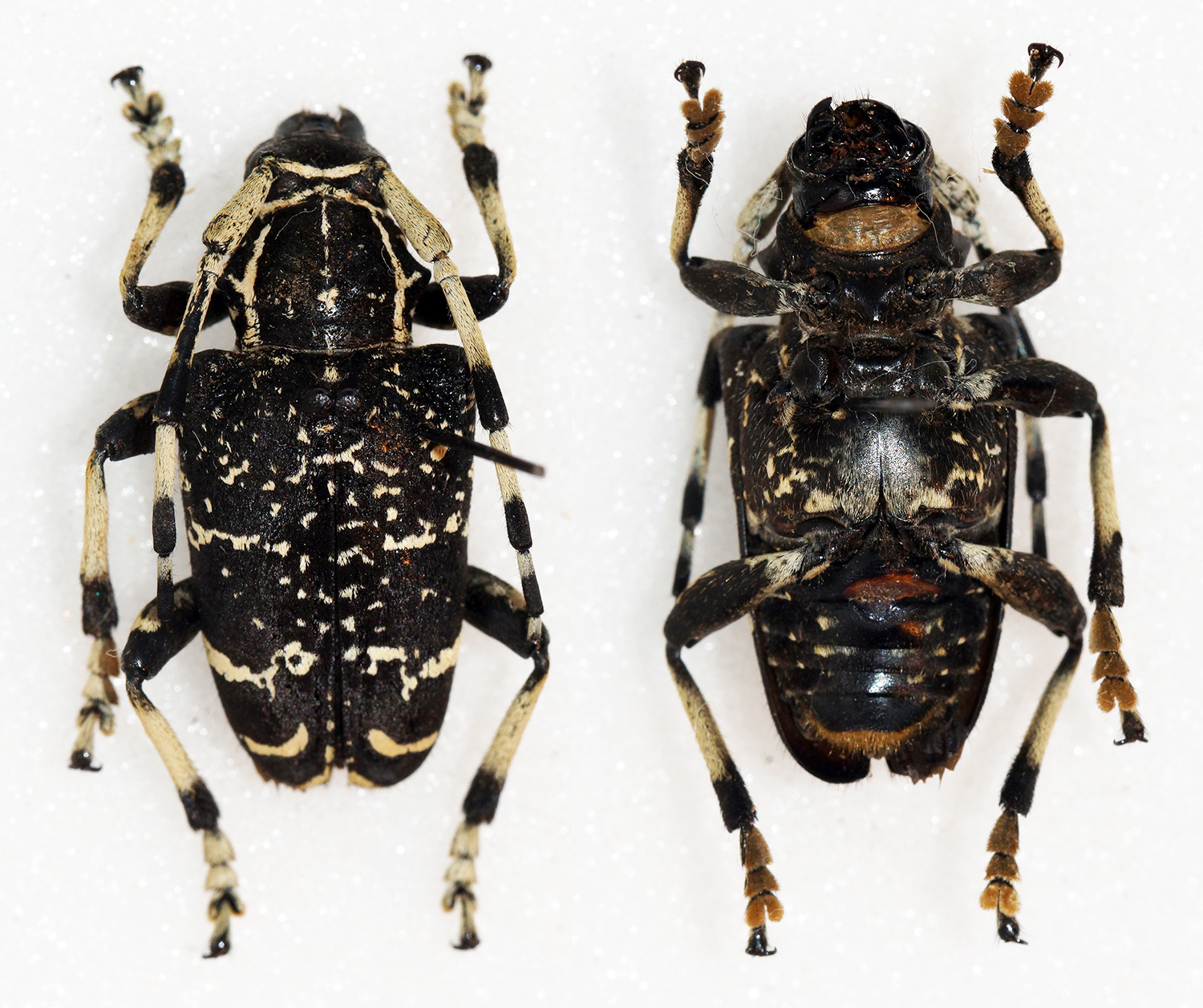
- Leucographus variegatus

Scientific classification
- Kingdom: Animalia
- Phylum: Arthropoda
- Class: Insecta
- Order: Coleoptera
- Suborder: Polyphaga
- Infraorder: Cucujiformia
- Family: Cerambycidae
- Tribe: Crossotini
- Genus: Leucographus; Waterhouse, 1878

= Leucographus =

Genus of beetles

Leucographus is a genus of longhorn beetles of the subfamily Lamiinae.

- Leucographus albovarius Waterhouse, 1878
- Leucographus alluaudi Fairmaire, 1897
- Leucographus catalai Villiers, 1939
- Leucographus variegatus Waterhouse, 1878
