= Sthenopygus =

Scientific classification
- Kingdom: Animalia
- Phylum: Arthropoda
- Class: Insecta
- Order: Coleoptera
- Suborder: Polyphaga
- Infraorder: Cucujiformia
- Family: Cerambycidae
- Tribe: Crossotini
- Genus: Sthenopygus
- Species: S. medioalbus

Binomial name
- Sthenopygus medioalbus Breuning, 1938

Genus of beetles

Sthenopygus medioalbus is a species of beetle in the family Cerambycidae, and the only species in the genus Sthenopygus. It was described by Breuning in 1938.
