= Apodasya =

Scientific classification
- Domain: Eukaryota
- Kingdom: Animalia
- Phylum: Arthropoda
- Class: Insecta
- Order: Coleoptera
- Suborder: Polyphaga
- Infraorder: Cucujiformia
- Family: Cerambycidae
- Subfamily: Lamiinae
- Tribe: Crossotini
- Genus: Apodasya; Pascoe, 1863

Synonyms
- Aspidocera Gistl, 1848; Chaetosoma Dejean, 1835

Genus of beetles

Apodasya is a genus of flat-faced longhorns in the beetle family Cerambycidae. There are at least two described species of Apodasya, found in Africa.

== Species ==
These two species belong to the genus Apodasya:

- Apodasya kenyensis Breuning, 1966 (Kenya)
- Apodasya pilosa Pascoe, 1863 (Ethiopia, Malawi, Mozambique, South Africa, DR Congo, Zambia, Zimbabwe)
