= Trachyliopus =

Scientific classification
- Kingdom: Animalia
- Phylum: Arthropoda
- Class: Insecta
- Order: Coleoptera
- Suborder: Polyphaga
- Infraorder: Cucujiformia
- Family: Cerambycidae
- Tribe: Crossotini
- Genus: Trachyliopus; Fairmaire, 1901

Genus of beetles

Trachyliopus is a genus of longhorn beetles of the subfamily Lamiinae, containing the following species:

subgenus Pseudoranova

- Trachyliopus albosignata Breuning, 1980
- Trachyliopus androyensis Breuning, 1957
- Trachyliopus forticornis (Fairmaire, 1901)
- Trachyliopus fuscosignatus (Fairmaire, 1886)
- Trachyliopus multifasciculatus Breuning, 1940
- Trachyliopus pauliani Breuning, 1957

subgenus Trachyliopus

- Trachyliopus affinis Breuning, 1957
- Trachyliopus annulicornis Fairmaire, 1901
- Trachyliopus fairmairei Breuning, 1957
- Trachyliopus fulvosparsus (Fairmaire, 1903)
- Trachyliopus minor (Fairmaire, 1902)
- Trachyliopus subannulicornis Breuning, 1970
