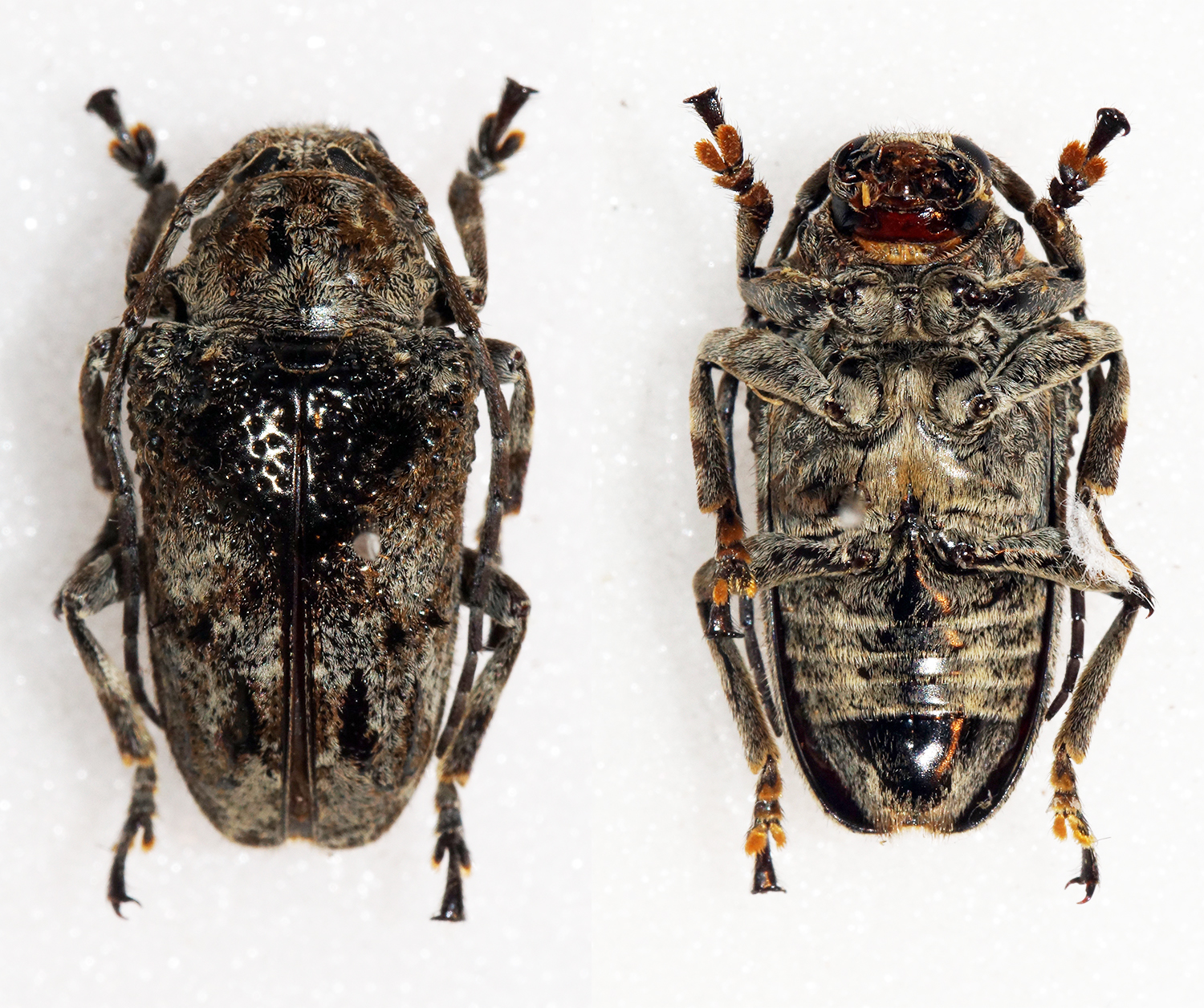

Scientific classification
- Domain: Eukaryota
- Kingdom: Animalia
- Phylum: Arthropoda
- Class: Insecta
- Order: Coleoptera
- Suborder: Polyphaga
- Infraorder: Cucujiformia
- Family: Cerambycidae
- Tribe: Crossotini
- Genus: Epidichostates; Teocchi & Sudre, 2003

Type species
- Dichostates molossus Duvivier, 1892.

= Epidichostates =

Genus of beetles

Epidichostates is a genus of longhorn beetles of the subfamily Lamiinae.

- Epidichostates molossus (Duvivier, 1892)
- Epidichostates strandi (Breuning, 1935)
