= Neohecyra =

Scientific classification
- Kingdom: Animalia
- Phylum: Arthropoda
- Class: Insecta
- Order: Coleoptera
- Suborder: Polyphaga
- Infraorder: Cucujiformia
- Family: Cerambycidae
- Tribe: Crossotini
- Genus: Neohecyra
- Species: N. graueri

Binomial name
- Neohecyra graueri (Hintz, 1916)

Genus of beetles

Neohecyra graueri is a species of beetle in the family Cerambycidae, and the only species in the genus Neohecyra. It was described by Hintz in 1916.
