= Niphecyra =

Scientific classification
- Kingdom: Animalia
- Phylum: Arthropoda
- Class: Insecta
- Order: Coleoptera
- Suborder: Polyphaga
- Infraorder: Cucujiformia
- Family: Cerambycidae
- Tribe: Crossotini
- Genus: Niphecyra; Kolbe, 1894

Genus of beetles

Niphecyra is a genus of longhorn beetles of the subfamily Lamiinae.

- Niphecyra interpres Kolbe, 1894
- Niphecyra papyri Lepesme, 1949
- Niphecyra rufolineata (Quedenfeldt, 1888)
- Niphecyra uniformis Breuning, 1936
