= Hecyra marmorata =

Scientific classification
- Kingdom: Animalia
- Phylum: Arthropoda
- Class: Insecta
- Order: Coleoptera
- Suborder: Polyphaga
- Infraorder: Cucujiformia
- Family: Cerambycidae
- Genus: Hecyra
- Species: H. marmorata

Binomial name
- Hecyra marmorata Breuning, 1972

Species of beetle

Hecyra marmorata is a species of beetle in the family Cerambycidae. It was described by Stephan von Breuning in 1972. It is known from the Central African Republic.
