= Tambusoides =

Scientific classification
- Kingdom: Animalia
- Phylum: Arthropoda
- Class: Insecta
- Order: Coleoptera
- Suborder: Polyphaga
- Infraorder: Cucujiformia
- Family: Cerambycidae
- Tribe: Crossotini
- Genus: Tambusoides
- Species: T. multifasciculatus

Binomial name
- Tambusoides multifasciculatus Breuning, 1955

Genus of beetles

Tambusoides multifasciculatus is a species of beetle in the family Cerambycidae, and the only species in the genus Tambusoides. It was described by Breuning in 1955.
