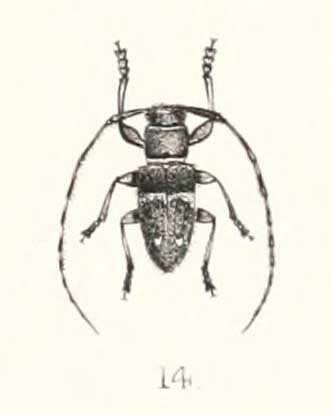
- Cincinnata fasciata

Scientific classification
- Kingdom: Animalia
- Phylum: Arthropoda
- Class: Insecta
- Order: Coleoptera
- Suborder: Polyphaga
- Infraorder: Cucujiformia
- Family: Cerambycidae
- Tribe: Crossotini
- Genus: Cincinnata

= Cincinnata =

Genus of beetles

Cincinnata is a genus of longhorn beetles of the subfamily Lamiinae.

- Cincinnata allardi Breuning, 1966
- Cincinnata fasciata Jordan, 1894
- Cincinnata konduensis Breuning, 1935
- Cincinnata schoutedeni Breuning, 1935
