= Paracrossotus =

Scientific classification
- Kingdom: Animalia
- Phylum: Arthropoda
- Class: Insecta
- Order: Coleoptera
- Suborder: Polyphaga
- Infraorder: Cucujiformia
- Family: Cerambycidae
- Tribe: Crossotini
- Genus: Paracrossotus
- Species: P. multifasciculatus

Binomial name
- Paracrossotus multifasciculatus Breuning, 1969

Genus of beetles

Paracrossotus multifasciculatus is a species of beetle in the family Cerambycidae, and the only species in the genus Paracrossotus. It was described by Breuning in 1969.
