= Geteuma =

Scientific classification
- Domain: Eukaryota
- Kingdom: Animalia
- Phylum: Arthropoda
- Class: Insecta
- Order: Coleoptera
- Suborder: Polyphaga
- Infraorder: Cucujiformia
- Family: Cerambycidae
- Tribe: Crossotini
- Genus: Geteuma

Genus of beetles

Geteuma is a genus of longhorn beetles of the subfamily Lamiinae.

- Geteuma peraffinis Breuning, 1971
- Geteuma quadridentata (Coquerel, 1851)
- Geteuma quadriguttata Coquerel, 1852
