= Paratlepolemoides =

Scientific classification
- Kingdom: Animalia
- Phylum: Arthropoda
- Class: Insecta
- Order: Coleoptera
- Suborder: Polyphaga
- Infraorder: Cucujiformia
- Family: Cerambycidae
- Tribe: Crossotini
- Genus: Paratlepolemoides
- Species: P. spiniscapus

Binomial name
- Paratlepolemoides spiniscapus (Hunt & Breuning, 1959)

Genus of beetles

Paratlepolemoides spiniscapus is a species of beetle in the family Cerambycidae, and the only species in the genus Paratlepolemoides. It was described by Hunt and Breuning in 1959.
