= Falsobiobessa =

Scientific classification
- Kingdom: Animalia
- Phylum: Arthropoda
- Class: Insecta
- Order: Coleoptera
- Suborder: Polyphaga
- Infraorder: Cucujiformia
- Family: Cerambycidae
- Tribe: Crossotini
- Genus: Falsobiobessa
- Species: F. fasciculosa

Binomial name
- Falsobiobessa fasciculosa Breuning, 1942

Genus of beetles

Falsobiobessa fasciculosa is a species of beetle in the family Cerambycidae, and the only species in the genus Falsobiobessa. It was described by Breuning in 1942.
