= Hecyromorpha =

Scientific classification
- Kingdom: Animalia
- Phylum: Arthropoda
- Class: Insecta
- Order: Coleoptera
- Suborder: Polyphaga
- Infraorder: Cucujiformia
- Family: Cerambycidae
- Tribe: Crossotini
- Genus: Hecyromorpha
- Species: H. plagicollis

Binomial name
- Hecyromorpha plagicollis (Gahan, 1904)

Genus of beetles

Hecyromorpha plagicollis is a species of beetle in the family Cerambycidae, and the only species in the genus Hecyromorpha. It was described by Gahan in 1904.
