= Mimomusonius =

Scientific classification
- Kingdom: Animalia
- Phylum: Arthropoda
- Clade: Pancrustacea
- Class: Insecta
- Order: Coleoptera
- Suborder: Polyphaga
- Infraorder: Cucujiformia
- Family: Cerambycidae
- Tribe: Crossotini
- Genus: Mimomusonius; Breuning, 1980
- Species: M. viettei

Binomial name
- Mimomusonius viettei Breuning, 1980

Genus of beetles

Mimomusonius viettei is a species of beetle in the family Cerambycidae, and the only species in the genus Mimomusonius. It was first formally described by entomologist Stephan von Breuning in 1980.
