= Pseudocorus =

Scientific classification
- Kingdom: Animalia
- Phylum: Arthropoda
- Class: Insecta
- Order: Coleoptera
- Suborder: Polyphaga
- Infraorder: Cucujiformia
- Family: Cerambycidae
- Tribe: Crossotini
- Genus: Pseudocorus
- Species: P. usambaricus

Binomial name
- Pseudocorus usambaricus Breuning, 1960

Genus of beetles

Pseudocorus usambaricus is a species of beetle in the family Cerambycidae, and the only species in the genus Pseudocorus. It was described by Breuning in 1960.
