= Paramusonius =

Scientific classification
- Kingdom: Animalia
- Phylum: Arthropoda
- Class: Insecta
- Order: Coleoptera
- Suborder: Polyphaga
- Infraorder: Cucujiformia
- Family: Cerambycidae
- Tribe: Crossotini
- Genus: Paramusonius; Breuning, 1980

Genus of beetles

Paramusonius is a genus of longhorn beetles of the subfamily Lamiinae.

- Paramusonius affinis Breuning, 1980
- Paramusonius peyrierasi Breuning, 1980
