= Mimocrossotus =

Scientific classification
- Kingdom: Animalia
- Phylum: Arthropoda
- Class: Insecta
- Order: Coleoptera
- Suborder: Polyphaga
- Infraorder: Cucujiformia
- Family: Cerambycidae
- Tribe: Crossotini
- Genus: Mimocrossotus

Genus of beetles

Mimocrossotus is a genus of longhorn beetles of the subfamily Lamiinae.

- Mimocrossotus rhodesianus Breuning, 1972
- Mimocrossotus ugandicola Breuning, 1964
