= Freocrossotus =

Scientific classification
- Kingdom: Animalia
- Phylum: Arthropoda
- Class: Insecta
- Order: Coleoptera
- Suborder: Polyphaga
- Infraorder: Cucujiformia
- Family: Cerambycidae
- Tribe: Crossotini
- Genus: Freocrossotus

Genus of beetles

Freocrossotus is a genus of longhorn beetles of the subfamily Lamiinae.

- Freocrossotus maynei Lepesme & Breuning, 1956
- Freocrossotus meridionalis Breuning, 1977
- Freocrossotus reticulatus Breuning, 1964
