= Megalofrea humeralis =

Scientific classification
- Kingdom: Animalia
- Phylum: Arthropoda
- Class: Insecta
- Order: Coleoptera
- Suborder: Polyphaga
- Infraorder: Cucujiformia
- Family: Cerambycidae
- Genus: Megalofrea
- Species: M. humeralis

Binomial name
- Megalofrea humeralis (Vollehoven, 1869)

Synonyms
- Eumimetes humeralis (Vollehoven), Fairmaire, 1896; Eumimetes sexpunctatus (Fairmaire) Künkel, 1871; Phymasterna sexpunctata Fairmaire, 1871; Phymasterna? humeralis Vollehoven, 1869; Phymatosterna humeralis (Vollehoven) Gemminger & Harold, 1873; Phymatosterna sexpunctata (Fairmaire) Gemminger & Harold, 1873

Species of beetle

Megalofrea humeralis is a species of beetle in the family Cerambycidae. It was described by Vollehoven in 1869. It is known from Madagascar.

== Varietas ==
- Megalofrea humeralis var. attenuata (Fairmaire, 1896)
- Megalofrea humeralis var. distincta (Fairmaire, 1871)
- Megalofrea humeralis var. rufonubila (Fairmaire, 1896)
- Megalofrea humeralis var. tenuepunctata (Fairmaire, 1902)
