= Parhecyra =

Scientific classification
- Kingdom: Animalia
- Phylum: Arthropoda
- Class: Insecta
- Order: Coleoptera
- Suborder: Polyphaga
- Infraorder: Cucujiformia
- Family: Cerambycidae
- Tribe: Crossotini
- Genus: Parhecyra; Breuning, 1942
- Species: P. costata

Binomial name
- Parhecyra costata (Aurivillius, 1908)

Genus of beetles

Parhecyra is a monotypic beetle genus in the family Cerambycidae described by Stephan von Breuning in 1942. Its only species, Parhecyra costata, was described by Per Olof Christopher Aurivillius in 1908.
