= Gasponia penicillata =

Scientific classification
- Domain: Eukaryota
- Kingdom: Animalia
- Phylum: Arthropoda
- Class: Insecta
- Order: Coleoptera
- Suborder: Polyphaga
- Infraorder: Cucujiformia
- Family: Cerambycidae
- Genus: Gasponia
- Species: G. penicillata

Binomial name
- Gasponia penicillata (Gahan, 1904)

Synonyms
- Crossotus penicillatus Gahan, 1904; Gasponia gaurani (Fairmaire); Gasponia gaujani penicillata (Gahan, 1904) (unjustified replacement name)

Species of beetle

Gasponia penicillata is a species of beetle in the family Cerambycidae. It was described by Gahan in 1904. It is known from Malawi, Zambia, Namibia, South Africa, Mozambique, and Zimbabwe.
