= Moechohecyra =

Scientific classification
- Kingdom: Animalia
- Phylum: Arthropoda
- Class: Insecta
- Order: Coleoptera
- Suborder: Polyphaga
- Infraorder: Cucujiformia
- Family: Cerambycidae
- Tribe: Crossotini
- Genus: Moechohecyra

Genus of beetles

Moechohecyra is a genus of longhorn beetles of the subfamily Lamiinae.

- Moechohecyra arctifera Wang & Chiang, 2002
- Moechohecyra indica Breuning, 1938
- Moechohecyra sumatrana Breuning, 1956
- Moechohecyra verrucicollis (Gahan, 1895)
