= Epirochroides =

Scientific classification
- Kingdom: Animalia
- Phylum: Arthropoda
- Class: Insecta
- Order: Coleoptera
- Suborder: Polyphaga
- Infraorder: Cucujiformia
- Family: Cerambycidae
- Tribe: Crossotini
- Genus: Epirochroides; Fairmaire, 1904
- Species: E. hovanus

Binomial name
- Epirochroides hovanus (Breuning, 1942)

Genus of beetles

Epirochroides hovanus is a species of beetle in the family Cerambycidae, and the only species in the genus Epirochroides. It was described by Fairmaire in 1904.
