= Mimiculus =

Scientific classification
- Kingdom: Animalia
- Phylum: Arthropoda
- Class: Insecta
- Order: Coleoptera
- Suborder: Polyphaga
- Infraorder: Cucujiformia
- Family: Cerambycidae
- Tribe: Crossotini
- Genus: Mimiculus
- Species: M. maculatus

Binomial name
- Mimiculus maculatus Jordan, 1894

Genus of beetles

Mimiculus maculatus is a species of beetle in the family Cerambycidae, and the only species in the genus Mimiculus. It was described by Karl Jordan in 1894.
