= Biasmia =

Scientific classification
- Kingdom: Animalia
- Phylum: Arthropoda
- Class: Insecta
- Order: Coleoptera
- Suborder: Polyphaga
- Infraorder: Cucujiformia
- Family: Cerambycidae
- Tribe: Crossotini
- Genus: Biasmia; Pascoe, 1864

Genus of beetles

Biasmia is a genus of longhorn beetles of the subfamily Lamiinae.

- Biasmia antennalis Hunt & Breuning, 1957
- Biasmia guttata Pascoe, 1864
