= Parabiobessa =

Scientific classification
- Kingdom: Animalia
- Phylum: Arthropoda
- Class: Insecta
- Order: Coleoptera
- Suborder: Polyphaga
- Infraorder: Cucujiformia
- Family: Cerambycidae
- Tribe: Crossotini
- Genus: Parabiobessa
- Species: P. ugandae

Binomial name
- Parabiobessa ugandae Breuning, 1936

Genus of beetles

Parabiobessa ugandae is a species of beetle in the family Cerambycidae, and the only species in the genus Parabiobessa. It was described by Breuning in 1936.
