= Mimocorus =

Scientific classification
- Kingdom: Animalia
- Phylum: Arthropoda
- Class: Insecta
- Order: Coleoptera
- Suborder: Polyphaga
- Infraorder: Cucujiformia
- Family: Cerambycidae
- Tribe: Crossotini
- Genus: Mimocorus
- Species: M. quadricristatus

Binomial name
- Mimocorus quadricristatus Breuning, 1942

Genus of beetles

Mimocorus quadricristatus is a species of beetle in the family Cerambycidae, and the only species in the genus Mimocorus. It was described by Breuning in 1942.
