= Frearanova =

Scientific classification
- Kingdom: Animalia
- Phylum: Arthropoda
- Class: Insecta
- Order: Coleoptera
- Suborder: Polyphaga
- Infraorder: Cucujiformia
- Family: Cerambycidae
- Tribe: Crossotini
- Genus: Frearanova
- Species: F. fuscostictica

Binomial name
- Frearanova fuscostictica Breuning, 1958

Genus of beetles

Frearanova fuscostictica is a species of beetle in the family Cerambycidae, and the only species in the genus Frearanova. It was described by Breuning in 1958.
