= Parasophronicomimus =

Scientific classification
- Kingdom: Animalia
- Phylum: Arthropoda
- Class: Insecta
- Order: Coleoptera
- Suborder: Polyphaga
- Infraorder: Cucujiformia
- Family: Cerambycidae
- Tribe: Crossotini
- Genus: Parasophronicomimus
- Species: P. ruber

Binomial name
- Parasophronicomimus ruber Breuning, 1970

Genus of beetles

Parasophronicomimus ruber is a species of beetle in the family Cerambycidae, and the only species in the genus Parasophronicomimus. It was described by Breuning in 1970.
