= Pseudofrea =

Scientific classification
- Kingdom: Animalia
- Phylum: Arthropoda
- Class: Insecta
- Order: Coleoptera
- Suborder: Polyphaga
- Infraorder: Cucujiformia
- Family: Cerambycidae
- Tribe: Crossotini
- Genus: Pseudofrea
- Species: P. tanganjicae

Binomial name
- Pseudofrea tanganjicae Breuning, 1978

Genus of beetles

Pseudofrea tanganjicae is a species of beetle in the family Cerambycidae, and the only species in the genus Pseudofrea. It was described by Breuning in 1978.
