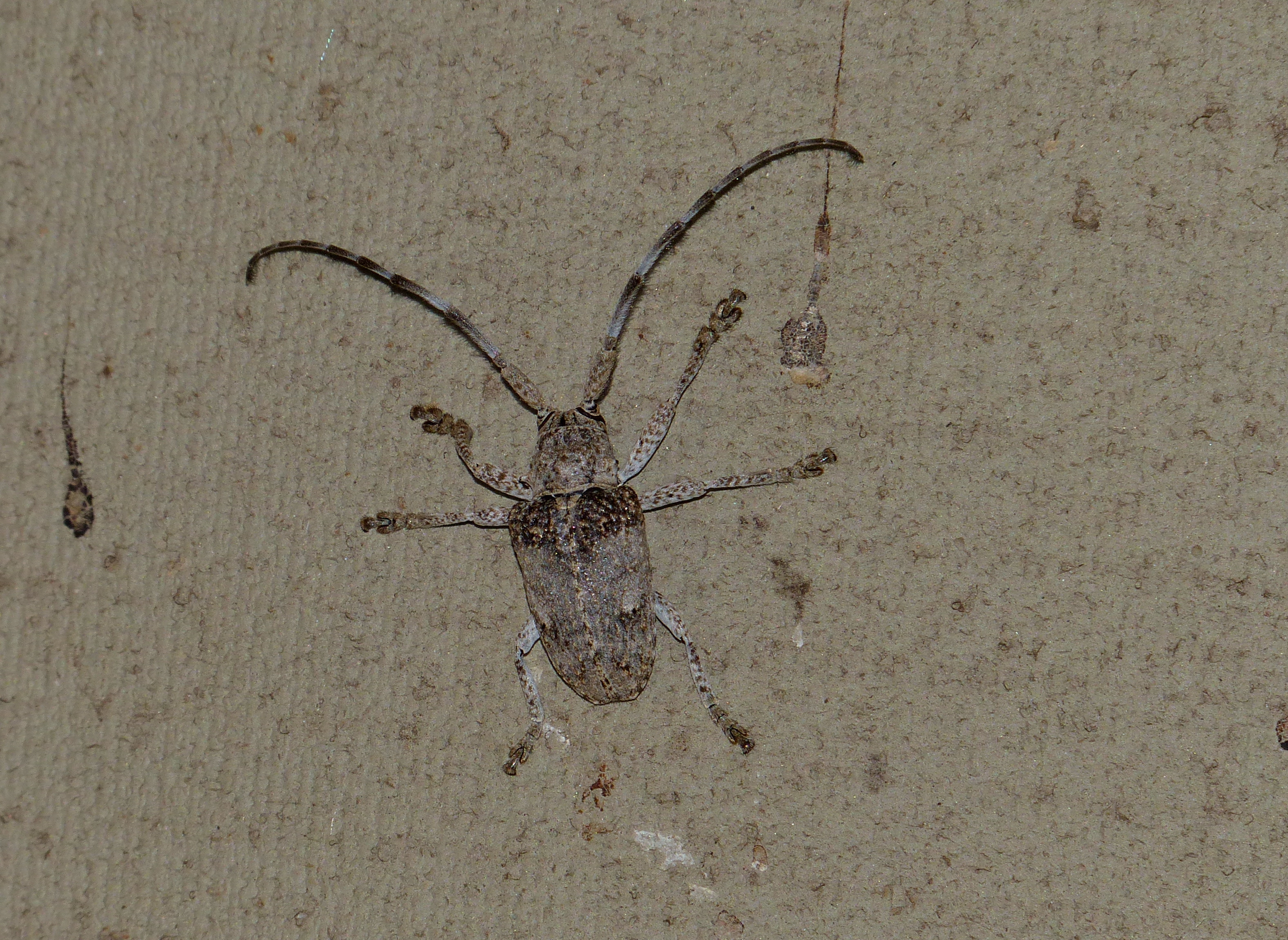
- Tetradia lophoptera

Scientific classification
- Kingdom: Animalia
- Phylum: Arthropoda
- Class: Insecta
- Order: Coleoptera
- Suborder: Polyphaga
- Infraorder: Cucujiformia
- Family: Cerambycidae
- Tribe: Crossotini
- Genus: Tetradia; Thomson, 1864
- Species: T. lophoptera

Binomial name
- Tetradia lophoptera (Guérin-Méneville, 1844)

= Tetradia =

Genus of beetles

Tetradia is a monotypic beetle genus in the family Cerambycidae described by Thomson in 1864. Its only species, Tetradia lophoptera, was described by Félix Édouard Guérin-Méneville in 1844.
