= Paradichostathes =

Scientific classification
- Kingdom: Animalia
- Phylum: Arthropoda
- Class: Insecta
- Order: Coleoptera
- Suborder: Polyphaga
- Infraorder: Cucujiformia
- Family: Cerambycidae
- Tribe: Crossotini
- Genus: Paradichostathes
- Species: P. curticornis

Binomial name
- Paradichostathes curticornis (Breuning, 1956)

Genus of beetles

Paradichostathes curticornis is a species of beetle in the family Cerambycidae, and the only species in the genus Paradichostathes. It was described by Breuning in 1956.
