= Mimohecyra =

Scientific classification
- Kingdom: Animalia
- Phylum: Arthropoda
- Class: Insecta
- Order: Coleoptera
- Suborder: Polyphaga
- Infraorder: Cucujiformia
- Family: Cerambycidae
- Tribe: Crossotini
- Genus: Mimohecyra
- Species: M. hiekei

Binomial name
- Mimohecyra hiekei Breuning, 1966

Genus of beetles

Mimohecyra hiekei is a species of beetle in the family Cerambycidae, and the only species in the genus Mimohecyra. It was described by Breuning in 1966.
