= Epirochroa =

Scientific classification
- Kingdom: Animalia
- Phylum: Arthropoda
- Class: Insecta
- Order: Coleoptera
- Suborder: Polyphaga
- Infraorder: Cucujiformia
- Family: Cerambycidae
- Subfamily: Lamiinae
- Tribe: Crossotini
- Genus: Epirochroa; Fairmaire, 1896

Genus of beetles

Epirochroa is a genus of longhorn beetles of the subfamily Lamiinae.

- Epirochroa acutecostata Fairmaire, 1899
- Epirochroa affinis Breuning, 1957
- Epirochroa albicollis (Fairmaire, 1897)
- Epirochroa cervinocincta Fairmaire, 1899
- Epirochroa dujardini Breuning, 1970
- Epirochroa fairmairei Lepesme & Villiers, 1944
- Epirochroa fasciolata Fairmaire, 1899
- Epirochroa griseovaria Fairmaire, 1896
- Epirochroa sparsuta Breuning, 1957
- Epirochroa vadoni Breuning, 1957
