= Paragasponia =

Scientific classification
- Kingdom: Animalia
- Phylum: Arthropoda
- Class: Insecta
- Order: Coleoptera
- Suborder: Polyphaga
- Infraorder: Cucujiformia
- Family: Cerambycidae
- Tribe: Crossotini
- Genus: Paragasponia
- Species: P. krantzi

Binomial name
- Paragasponia krantzi Breuning, 1981

Genus of beetles

Paragasponia krantzi is a species of beetle in the family Cerambycidae, and the only species in the genus Paragasponia. It was described by Stephan von Breuning in 1981.
