= Paraphanis =

Scientific classification
- Kingdom: Animalia
- Phylum: Arthropoda
- Class: Insecta
- Order: Coleoptera
- Suborder: Polyphaga
- Infraorder: Cucujiformia
- Family: Cerambycidae
- Tribe: Crossotini
- Genus: Paraphanis
- Species: P. rougemonti

Binomial name
- Paraphanis rougemonti Breuning, 1977

Genus of beetles

Paraphanis rougemonti is a species of beetle in the family Cerambycidae, and the only species in the genus Paraphanis. It was described by Breuning in 1977.
