= Pseudohecyra =

Scientific classification
- Kingdom: Animalia
- Phylum: Arthropoda
- Class: Insecta
- Order: Coleoptera
- Suborder: Polyphaga
- Infraorder: Cucujiformia
- Family: Cerambycidae
- Tribe: Crossotini
- Genus: Pseudohecyra
- Species: P. lutulenta

Binomial name
- Pseudohecyra lutulenta (Gestro, 1892)

Genus of beetles

Pseudohecyra lutulenta is a species of beetle in the family Cerambycidae, and the only species in the genus Pseudohecyra. It was described by Gestro in 1892.
