= Hecyra obscurator =

Scientific classification
- Domain: Eukaryota
- Kingdom: Animalia
- Phylum: Arthropoda
- Class: Insecta
- Order: Coleoptera
- Suborder: Polyphaga
- Infraorder: Cucujiformia
- Family: Cerambycidae
- Genus: Hecyra
- Species: H. obscurator

Binomial name
- Hecyra obscurator (Fabricius, 1801)

Synonyms
- Lamia obscurator Fabricius, 1801; Omopsides blanchardi Chevrolat, 1858

Species of beetle

Hecyra obscurator is a species of beetle in the family Cerambycidae. It was described by Johan Christian Fabricius in 1801. It is known from Angola, Guinea, Ghana, Mozambique, Senegal, the Central African Republic, the Democratic Republic of the Congo, Cameroon, and Nigeria.
