= Gasponia fascicularis =

Scientific classification
- Kingdom: Animalia
- Phylum: Arthropoda
- Class: Insecta
- Order: Coleoptera
- Suborder: Polyphaga
- Infraorder: Cucujiformia
- Family: Cerambycidae
- Genus: Gasponia
- Species: G. fascicularis

Binomial name
- Gasponia fascicularis (Fairmaire, 1887)

Synonyms
- Cerambyx fascicularis Fairmaire, 1887; Gasponia seriemaculatus Hintz, 1912

Species of beetle

Gasponia fascicularis is a species of beetle in the family Cerambycidae. It was described by Fairmaire in 1887. It is known from Botswana, Mozambique, Malawi, Zambia, and Tanzania.
