= Ecyroschema =

Scientific classification
- Domain: Eukaryota
- Kingdom: Animalia
- Phylum: Arthropoda
- Class: Insecta
- Order: Coleoptera
- Suborder: Polyphaga
- Infraorder: Cucujiformia
- Family: Cerambycidae
- Subfamily: Lamiinae
- Tribe: Crossotini
- Genus: Ecyroschema; Thomson, 1864

Type species
- Ecyroschema favosa Thomson, 1864

Genus of beetles

Ecyroschema is a genus of longhorn beetles of the subfamily Lamiinae.

- Ecyroschema favosum Thomson, 1864
- Ecyroschema morini Téocchi, Jiroux, Sudre & Ture, 2008
- Ecyroschema multituberculatum Breuning, 1942
- Ecyroschema rugatum Pascoe, 1888
- Ecyroschema tuberculatum Breuning, 1948
- Ecyroschema zanzibaricum Adlbauer, Sudre & Téocchi, 2007
