= Ranova =

Scientific classification
- Kingdom: Animalia
- Phylum: Arthropoda
- Class: Insecta
- Order: Coleoptera
- Suborder: Polyphaga
- Infraorder: Cucujiformia
- Family: Cerambycidae
- Tribe: Crossotini
- Genus: Ranova; Thomson, 1864

Genus of beetles

Ranova is a genus of longhorn beetles of the subfamily Lamiinae, containing the following species:

- Ranova lineigera Fairmaire, 1889
- Ranova pictipes Thomson, 1864
- Ranova similis Breuning, 1953
