= Hecyroides =

Scientific classification
- Kingdom: Animalia
- Phylum: Arthropoda
- Class: Insecta
- Order: Coleoptera
- Suborder: Polyphaga
- Infraorder: Cucujiformia
- Family: Cerambycidae
- Tribe: Crossotini
- Genus: Hecyroides
- Species: H. lateriplagiata

Binomial name
- Hecyroides lateriplagiata Breuning, 1938

Genus of beetles

Hecyroides lateriplagiata is a species of beetle in the family Cerambycidae, and the only species in the genus Hecyroides. It was described by Breuning in 1938.
