= Mimomimiculus =

Scientific classification
- Kingdom: Animalia
- Phylum: Arthropoda
- Class: Insecta
- Order: Coleoptera
- Suborder: Polyphaga
- Infraorder: Cucujiformia
- Family: Cerambycidae
- Tribe: Crossotini
- Genus: Mimomimiculus
- Species: M. latefasciatus

Binomial name
- Mimomimiculus latefasciatus Breuning, 1970

Genus of beetles

Mimomimiculus latefasciatus is a species of beetle in the family Cerambycidae, and the only species in the genus Mimomimiculus. It was described by Breuning in 1970.
