= Freocorus =

Scientific classification
- Kingdom: Animalia
- Phylum: Arthropoda
- Class: Insecta
- Order: Coleoptera
- Suborder: Polyphaga
- Infraorder: Cucujiformia
- Family: Cerambycidae
- Tribe: Crossotini
- Genus: Freocorus
- Species: F. turgidus

Binomial name
- Freocorus turgidus Hunt & Breuning, 1955

Genus of beetles

Freocorus turgidus is a species of beetle in the family Cerambycidae, and the only species in the genus Freocorus. It was described by Hunt and Breuning in 1955.
