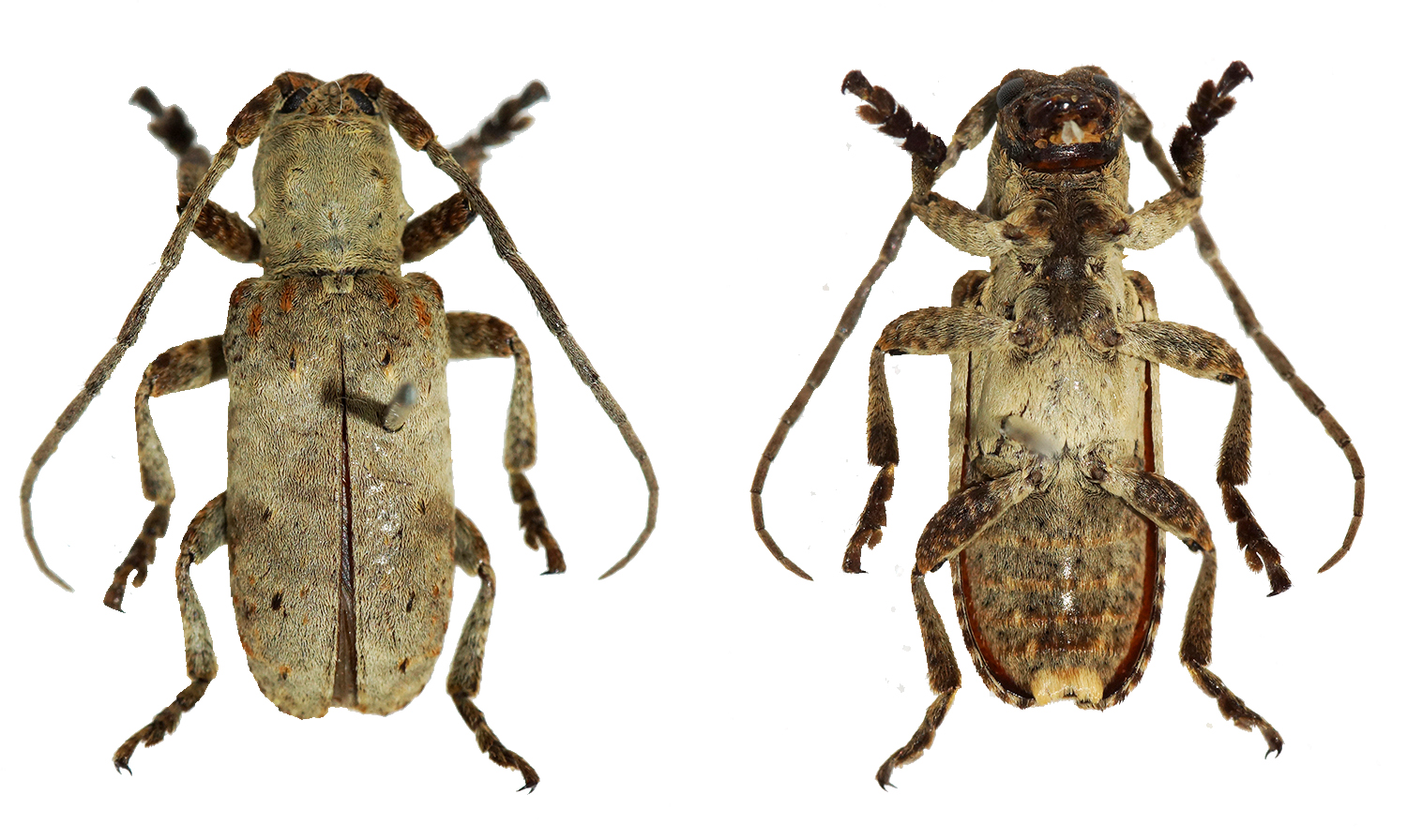
- Biobessa beatrix

Scientific classification
- Kingdom: Animalia
- Phylum: Arthropoda
- Class: Insecta
- Order: Coleoptera
- Suborder: Polyphaga
- Infraorder: Cucujiformia
- Family: Cerambycidae
- Tribe: Crossotini
- Genus: Biobessa

= Biobessa =

Genus of beetles

Biobessa is a genus of longhorn beetles of the subfamily Lamiinae.

- Biobessa albopunctata Breuning, 1935
- Biobessa beatrix Gahan, 1898
- Biobessa holzschuhi Téocchi, 1991
