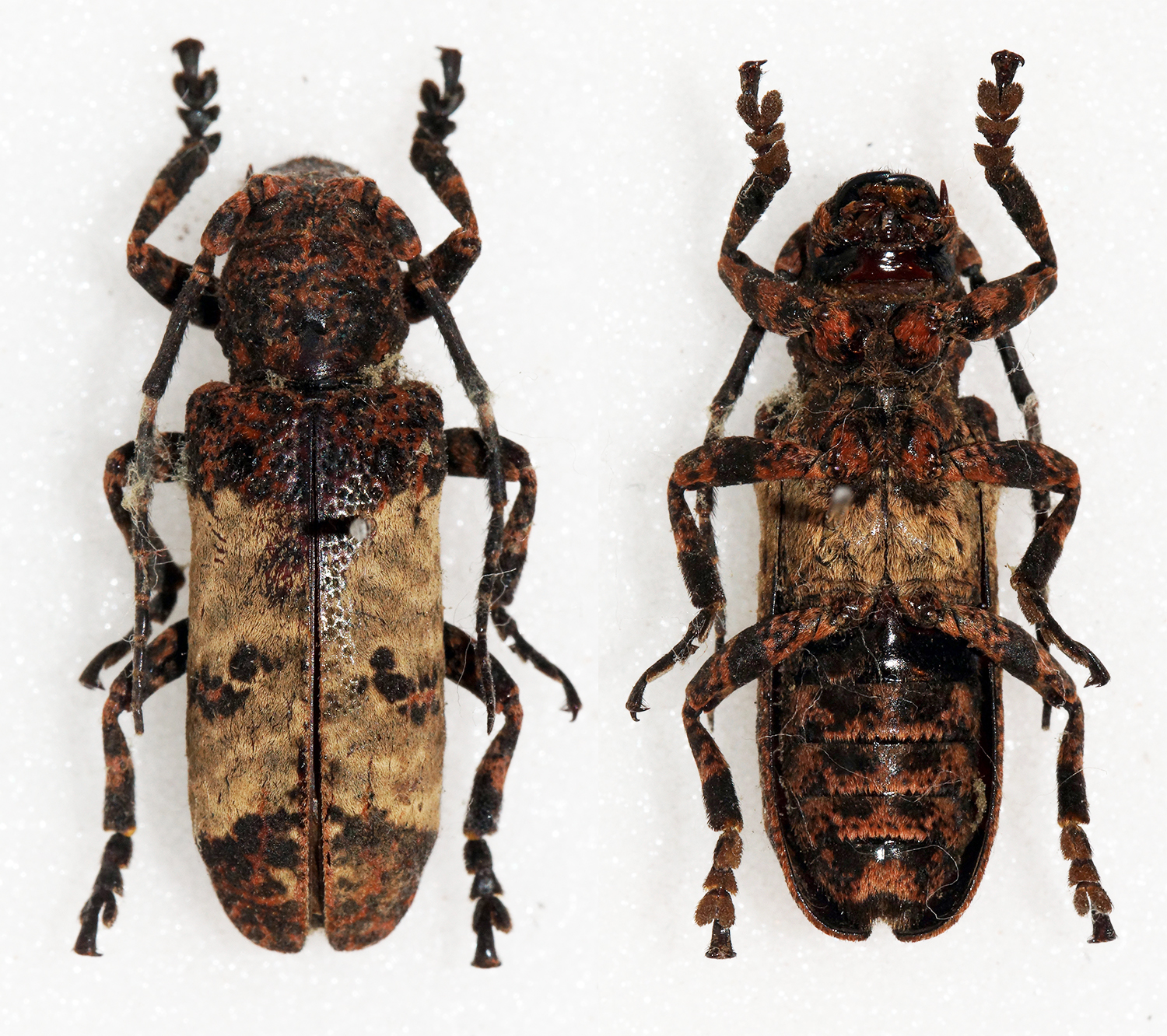

Scientific classification
- Kingdom: Animalia
- Phylum: Arthropoda
- Class: Insecta
- Order: Coleoptera
- Suborder: Polyphaga
- Infraorder: Cucujiformia
- Family: Cerambycidae
- Tribe: Crossotini
- Genus: Plectropygus
- Species: P. mucoreus

Binomial name
- Plectropygus mucoreus Gahan, 1898

= Plectropygus =

Genus of beetles

Plectropygus mucoreus is a species of beetle in the family Cerambycidae, and the only species in the genus Plectropygus. It was described by Gahan in 1898.
