= Parafreoides =

Scientific classification
- Kingdom: Animalia
- Phylum: Arthropoda
- Class: Insecta
- Order: Coleoptera
- Suborder: Polyphaga
- Infraorder: Cucujiformia
- Family: Cerambycidae
- Tribe: Crossotini
- Genus: Parafreoides
- Species: P. ghanaensis

Binomial name
- Parafreoides ghanaensis Breuning, 1975

Genus of beetles

Parafreoides ghanaensis is a species of beetle in the family Cerambycidae, and the only species in the genus Parafreoides. It was described by Breuning in 1975.
