= Pseudhecyra =

Scientific classification
- Kingdom: Animalia
- Phylum: Arthropoda
- Class: Insecta
- Order: Coleoptera
- Suborder: Polyphaga
- Infraorder: Cucujiformia
- Family: Cerambycidae
- Tribe: Crossotini
- Genus: Pseudhecyra
- Species: P. albofasciata

Binomial name
- Pseudhecyra albofasciata Breuning, 1976

Genus of beetles

Pseudhecyra albofasciata is a species of beetle in the family Cerambycidae, and the only species in the genus Pseudhecyra. It was described by Breuning in 1976.
