= Freostathes =

Scientific classification
- Kingdom: Animalia
- Phylum: Arthropoda
- Class: Insecta
- Order: Coleoptera
- Suborder: Polyphaga
- Infraorder: Cucujiformia
- Family: Cerambycidae
- Tribe: Crossotini
- Genus: Freostathes
- Species: F. freoides

Binomial name
- Freostathes freoides Breuning, 1969

Genus of beetles

Freostathes freoides is a species of beetle in the family Cerambycidae, and the only species in the genus Freostathes. It was described by Breuning in 1969.
