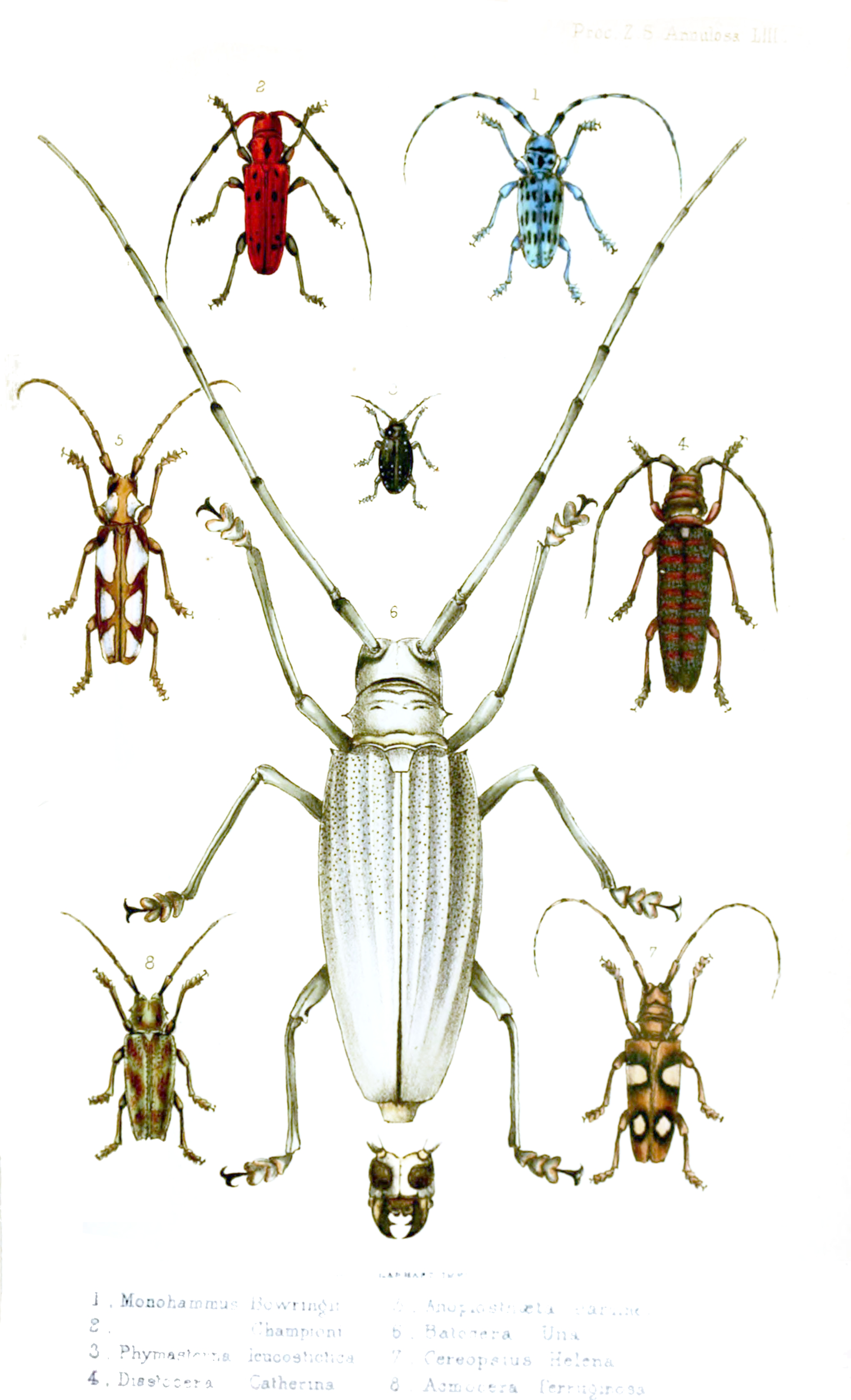

Scientific classification
- Kingdom: Animalia
- Phylum: Arthropoda
- Class: Insecta
- Order: Coleoptera
- Suborder: Polyphaga
- Infraorder: Cucujiformia
- Family: Cerambycidae
- Tribe: Crossotini
- Genus: Freopsis
- Species: F. leucostictica

Binomial name
- Freopsis leucostictica (White, 1858)

= Freopsis =

Genus of beetles

Freopsis leucostictica is a species of beetle in the family Cerambycidae, and the only species in the genus Freopsis. It was described by White in 1858.
