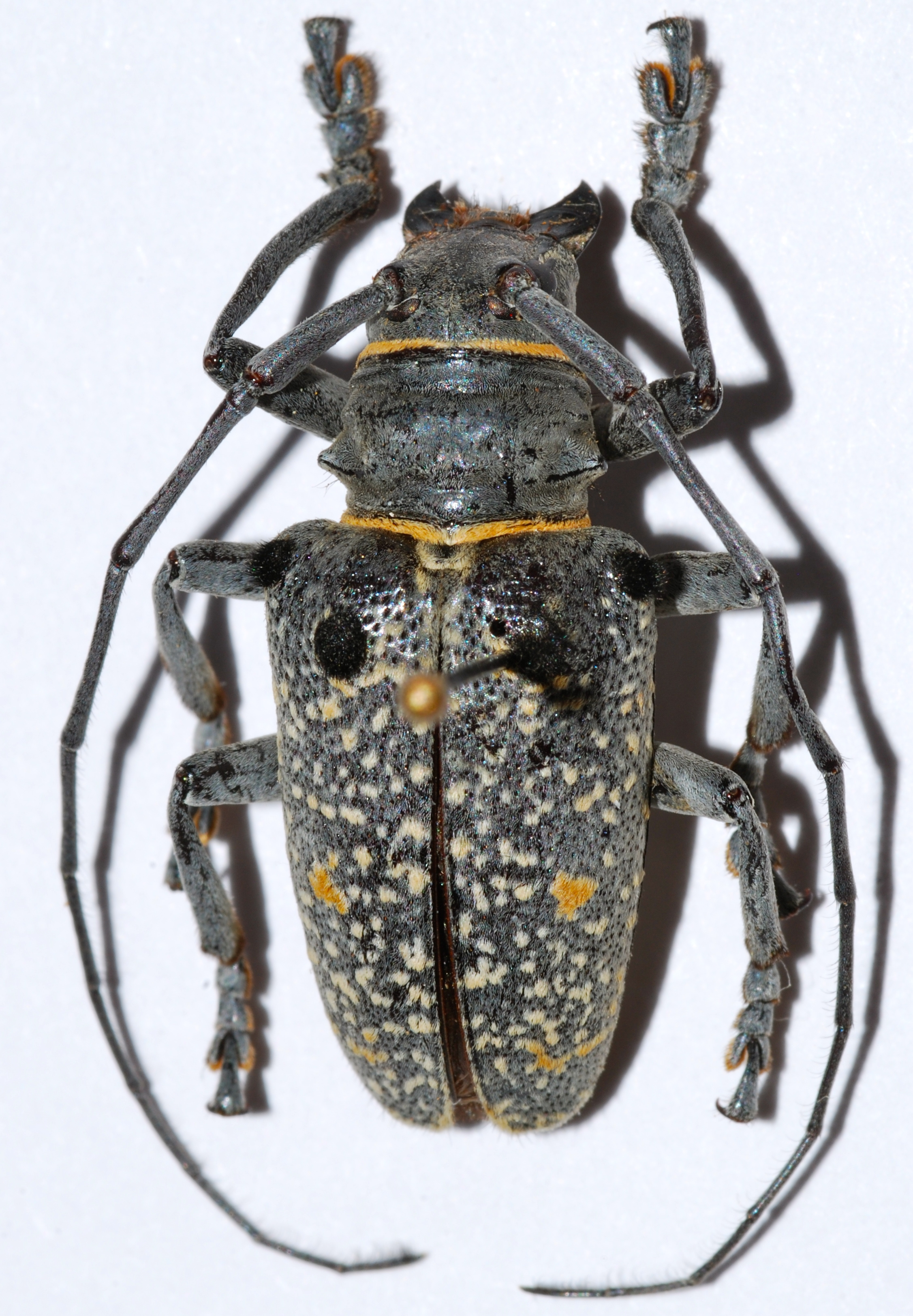

Scientific classification
- Kingdom: Animalia
- Phylum: Arthropoda
- Class: Insecta
- Order: Coleoptera
- Suborder: Polyphaga
- Infraorder: Cucujiformia
- Family: Cerambycidae
- Genus: Megalofrea
- Species: M. bioculata

Binomial name
- Megalofrea bioculata (Fairmaire, 1889)

Synonyms
- Eumimetes bioculatus Fairmaire, 1894

= Megalofrea bioculata =

Species of beetle

Megalofrea bioculata is a species of beetle in the family Cerambycidae. It was described by Fairmaire in 1889. It is known from Madagascar.

== Varietas ==
- Megalofrea bioculata breuningi (Lepesme & Villiers, 1944)
- Megalofrea bioculata trioculata Breuning, 1942
