= Corynofrea =

Scientific classification
- Kingdom: Animalia
- Phylum: Arthropoda
- Class: Insecta
- Order: Coleoptera
- Suborder: Polyphaga
- Infraorder: Cucujiformia
- Family: Cerambycidae
- Tribe: Crossotini
- Genus: Corynofrea

Genus of beetles

Corynofrea is a genus of longhorn beetles of the subfamily Lamiinae.

- Corynofrea camerunica Breuning, 1950
- Corynofrea mirabilis Aurivillius, 1910
- Corynofrea nigritarsis Breuning, 1940
- Corynofrea rubra (Jordan, 1903)
