= Hecyra terrea =

Scientific classification
- Domain: Eukaryota
- Kingdom: Animalia
- Phylum: Arthropoda
- Class: Insecta
- Order: Coleoptera
- Suborder: Polyphaga
- Infraorder: Cucujiformia
- Family: Cerambycidae
- Genus: Hecyra
- Species: H. terrea

Binomial name
- Hecyra terrea (Bertoloni, 1849)

Synonyms
- Crossotus terreus Bertoloni, 1849; Hecyra improba Thomson, 1857; Hecyrida improba (Thomson) Fahraeus, 1872; Hecyrida terrea (Bertoloni) Distant, 1904

Species of beetle

Hecyra terrea is a species of beetle in the family Cerambycidae. It was described by Bertoloni in 1849. It is known from Angola, Botswana, Namibia, Zimbabwe, Mozambique, Kenya, Tanzania, Malawi, and the Democratic Republic of the Congo.
