= Paramimiculus =

Scientific classification
- Kingdom: Animalia
- Phylum: Arthropoda
- Class: Insecta
- Order: Coleoptera
- Suborder: Polyphaga
- Infraorder: Cucujiformia
- Family: Cerambycidae
- Tribe: Crossotini
- Genus: Paramimiculus
- Species: P. pterolophioides

Binomial name
- Paramimiculus pterolophioides Breuning, 1964

Genus of beetles

Paramimiculus pterolophioides is a species of beetle in the family Cerambycidae, and the only species in the genus Paramimiculus. It was described by Breuning in 1964.
