= Megalofrea cinerascens =

Scientific classification
- Kingdom: Animalia
- Phylum: Arthropoda
- Class: Insecta
- Order: Coleoptera
- Suborder: Polyphaga
- Infraorder: Cucujiformia
- Family: Cerambycidae
- Genus: Megalofrea
- Species: M. cinerascens

Binomial name
- Megalofrea cinerascens (Fairmaire, 1901)

Synonyms
- Megalofrea parasparsuticollis Breuning, 1970

Species of beetle

Megalofrea cinerascens is a species of beetle in the family Cerambycidae. It was described by Fairmaire in 1901. It is known from Madagascar.
