= Megalofrea sparsuticollis =

Scientific classification
- Kingdom: Animalia
- Phylum: Arthropoda
- Class: Insecta
- Order: Coleoptera
- Suborder: Polyphaga
- Infraorder: Cucujiformia
- Family: Cerambycidae
- Genus: Megalofrea
- Species: M. sparsuticollis

Binomial name
- Megalofrea sparsuticollis (Fairmaire, 1897)

Species of beetle

Megalofrea sparsuticollis is a species of beetle in the family Cerambycidae. It was described by Fairmaire in 1897. It is known from Madagascar.
