= Hecyra tenebrioides =

Scientific classification
- Domain: Eukaryota
- Kingdom: Animalia
- Phylum: Arthropoda
- Class: Insecta
- Order: Coleoptera
- Suborder: Polyphaga
- Infraorder: Cucujiformia
- Family: Cerambycidae
- Genus: Hecyra
- Species: H. tenebrioides

Binomial name
- Hecyra tenebrioides Fåhraeus, 1872

Species of beetle

Hecyra tenebrioides is a species of beetle in the family Cerambycidae. It was described by Fåhraeus in 1872. It is known from Namibia, Malawi, Tanzania, the Democratic Republic of the Congo, and Mozambique. It contains the varietas Hecyra tenebrioides var. rufithorax.
