= Tlepolemoides =

Scientific classification
- Kingdom: Animalia
- Phylum: Arthropoda
- Class: Insecta
- Order: Coleoptera
- Suborder: Polyphaga
- Infraorder: Cucujiformia
- Family: Cerambycidae
- Tribe: Crossotini
- Genus: Tlepolemoides
- Species: T. vadoni

Binomial name
- Tlepolemoides vadoni Breuning, 1957

Genus of beetles

Tlepolemoides vadoni is a species of beetle in the family Cerambycidae, and the only species in the genus Tlepolemoides. It was described by Breuning in 1957.
