= Pallidohecyra =

Scientific classification
- Kingdom: Animalia
- Phylum: Arthropoda
- Class: Insecta
- Order: Coleoptera
- Suborder: Polyphaga
- Infraorder: Cucujiformia
- Family: Cerambycidae
- Tribe: Crossotini
- Genus: Pallidohecyra
- Species: P. pallida

Binomial name
- Pallidohecyra pallida (Breuning, 1938)

Genus of beetles

Pallidohecyra pallida is a species of beetle in the family Cerambycidae, and the only species in the genus Pallidohecyra. It was described by Breuning in 1938.
