= Gasponia gaurani =

Scientific classification
- Kingdom: Animalia
- Phylum: Arthropoda
- Class: Insecta
- Order: Coleoptera
- Suborder: Polyphaga
- Infraorder: Cucujiformia
- Family: Cerambycidae
- Genus: Gasponia
- Species: G. gaurani

Binomial name
- Gasponia gaurani Fairmaire, 1892

Synonyms
- Gasponia gaujani Fairmaire, 1892 (misspelling); Gasponia gaujani gaujani Fairmaire, 1892 (unjustified emendation)

Species of beetle

Gasponia gaurani is a species of beetle in the family Cerambycidae. It was described by Fairmaire in 1892. It is known from Ethiopia, Djibouti, Somalia, Kenya, and Tanzania.
