= Stenideopsis =

Scientific classification
- Kingdom: Animalia
- Phylum: Arthropoda
- Class: Insecta
- Order: Coleoptera
- Suborder: Polyphaga
- Infraorder: Cucujiformia
- Family: Cerambycidae
- Tribe: Crossotini
- Genus: Stenideopsis
- Species: S. madagascariensis

Binomial name
- Stenideopsis madagascariensis Breuning, 1940

Genus of beetles

Stenideopsis madagascariensis is a species of beetle in the family Cerambycidae, and the only species in the genus Stenideopsis. It was described by Breuning in 1940.
