= Paracorus =

Scientific classification
- Kingdom: Animalia
- Phylum: Arthropoda
- Class: Insecta
- Order: Coleoptera
- Suborder: Polyphaga
- Infraorder: Cucujiformia
- Family: Cerambycidae
- Tribe: Crossotini
- Genus: Paracorus; Kolbe, 1893

Genus of beetles

Paracorus is a genus of longhorn beetles of the subfamily Lamiinae.

- Paracorus mirei Breuning, 1969
- Paracorus praecox Kolbe, 1894
