= Megalofrea decorsei =

Scientific classification
- Kingdom: Animalia
- Phylum: Arthropoda
- Class: Insecta
- Order: Coleoptera
- Suborder: Polyphaga
- Infraorder: Cucujiformia
- Family: Cerambycidae
- Genus: Megalofrea
- Species: M. decorsei

Binomial name
- Megalofrea decorsei (Fairmaire, 1901)

Species of beetle

Megalofrea decorsei is a species of beetle in the family Cerambycidae. It was described by Fairmaire in 1901. It is known from Madagascar. Megalofrea decorsei is characterized by its elongated body and long antennae, typical of the Cerambycidae family. The beetle's exoskeleton is often a dark brown or black color, providing effective camouflage in its natural habitat. Like many beetles in its family, Megalofrea decorsei plays a role in the ecosystem by aiding in the decomposition of wood and plant material.
