= Sophronicomimus =

Scientific classification
- Kingdom: Animalia
- Phylum: Arthropoda
- Class: Insecta
- Order: Coleoptera
- Suborder: Polyphaga
- Infraorder: Cucujiformia
- Family: Cerambycidae
- Tribe: Crossotini
- Genus: Sophronicomimus
- Species: S. densepunctatus

Binomial name
- Sophronicomimus densepunctatus Breuning, 1957

Genus of beetles

Sophronicomimus densepunctatus is a species of beetle in the family Cerambycidae, and the only species in the genus Sophronicomimus. It was described by Breuning in 1957.
