= Pseudocrossotus =

Scientific classification
- Kingdom: Animalia
- Phylum: Arthropoda
- Class: Insecta
- Order: Coleoptera
- Suborder: Polyphaga
- Infraorder: Cucujiformia
- Family: Cerambycidae
- Tribe: Crossotini
- Genus: Pseudocrossotus

Genus of beetles

Pseudocrossotus is a genus of longhorn beetles of the subfamily Lamiinae, containing the following species:

- Pseudocrossotus albomaculatus (Breuning, 1938)
- Pseudocrossotus pujoli (Teocchi, 1991)
