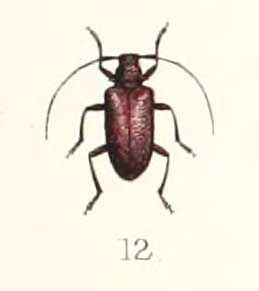
- Lagrida rufa

Scientific classification
- Kingdom: Animalia
- Phylum: Arthropoda
- Class: Insecta
- Order: Coleoptera
- Family: Cerambycidae
- Subfamily: Lamiinae
- Genus: Lagrida

= Lagrida =

Genus of beetles

Lagrida is a genus of longhorn beetles of the subfamily Lamiinae.

- Lagrida aenea Hintz, 1919
- Lagrida nitida Breuning, 1938
- Lagrida rufa Jordan, 1894
