= Hecyra (beetle) =

Scientific classification
- Domain: Eukaryota
- Kingdom: Animalia
- Phylum: Arthropoda
- Class: Insecta
- Order: Coleoptera
- Suborder: Polyphaga
- Infraorder: Cucujiformia
- Family: Cerambycidae
- Subfamily: Lamiinae
- Genus: Hecyra

Genus of beetles

Hecyra is a genus of longhorn beetles of the subfamily Lamiinae.

- Hecyra marmorata Breuning, 1972
- Hecyra obscurator (Fabricius, 1801)
- Hecyra tenebrioides Fåhraeus, 1872
- Hecyra terrea (Bertoloni, 1849)
