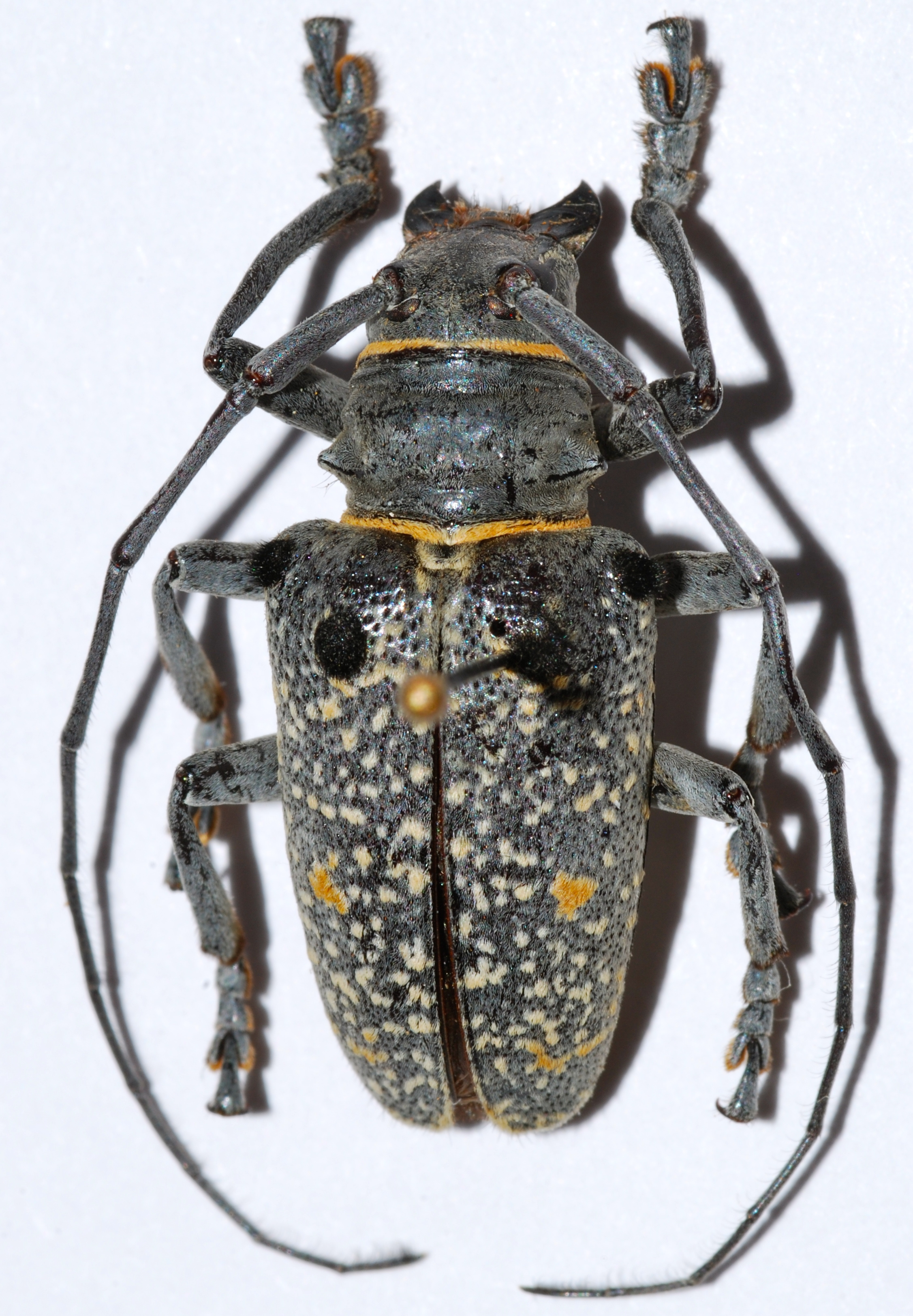
- Megalofrea bioculata

Scientific classification
- Kingdom: Animalia
- Phylum: Arthropoda
- Class: Insecta
- Order: Coleoptera
- Suborder: Polyphaga
- Infraorder: Cucujiformia
- Family: Cerambycidae
- Genus: Megalofrea

= Megalofrea =

Genus of beetles

Megalofrea is a genus of longhorn beetles of the subfamily Lamiinae.

- Megalofrea bioculata (Fairmaire, 1889)
- Megalofrea cinerascens (Fairmaire, 1901)
- Megalofrea decorsei (Fairmaire, 1901)
- Megalofrea humeralis (Vollehoven, 1869)
- Megalofrea sparsuticollis (Fairmaire, 1897)
