= Phanis =

Scientific classification
- Kingdom: Animalia
- Phylum: Arthropoda
- Class: Insecta
- Order: Coleoptera
- Suborder: Polyphaga
- Infraorder: Cucujiformia
- Family: Cerambycidae
- Tribe: Crossotini
- Genus: Phanis; Fairmaire, 1893

Genus of beetles

Phanis is a genus of longhorn beetles of the subfamily Lamiinae, containing the following species:

- Phanis armicollis Fairmaire, 1893
- Phanis tanganjicae Breuning, 1978
