= Mycerinus (beetle) =

Scientific classification
- Kingdom: Animalia
- Phylum: Arthropoda
- Class: Insecta
- Order: Coleoptera
- Suborder: Polyphaga
- Infraorder: Cucujiformia
- Family: Cerambycidae
- Tribe: Crossotini
- Genus: Mycerinus

Genus of beetles

Mycerinus is a genus of longhorn beetles of the subfamily Lamiinae.

- Mycerinus brevis Aurivillius, 1914
- Mycerinus dorcadioides (Audinet-Serville, 1835)
- Mycerinus limbatus Kolbe, 1894
- Mycerinus multilineatus Breuning, 1936
- Mycerinus punctiventris (Kolbe, 1893)
- Mycerinus subcostatus (Kolbe, 1894)
