= Gasponia =

Scientific classification
- Domain: Eukaryota
- Kingdom: Animalia
- Phylum: Arthropoda
- Class: Insecta
- Order: Coleoptera
- Suborder: Polyphaga
- Infraorder: Cucujiformia
- Family: Cerambycidae
- Subfamily: Lamiinae
- Genus: Gasponia

Genus of beetles

Gasponia is a genus of longhorn beetles of the subfamily Lamiinae.

- Gasponia fascicularis (Fairmaire, 1887)
- Gasponia gaurani Fairmaire, 1892
- Gasponia penicillata (Gahan, 1904)
