= Musonius =

Scientific classification
- Kingdom: Animalia
- Phylum: Arthropoda
- Class: Insecta
- Order: Coleoptera
- Suborder: Polyphaga
- Infraorder: Cucujiformia
- Family: Cerambycidae
- Tribe: Ceroplesini
- Subtribe: Crossotina
- Genus: Musonius; Fairmaire, 1902
- Species: M. luctuosus

Binomial name
- Musonius luctuosus Fairmaire, 1902

Genus of beetles

Musonius is a genus of longhorned beetles in the family Cerambycidae. This genus has a single species, Musonius luctuosus, found in Madagascar.
