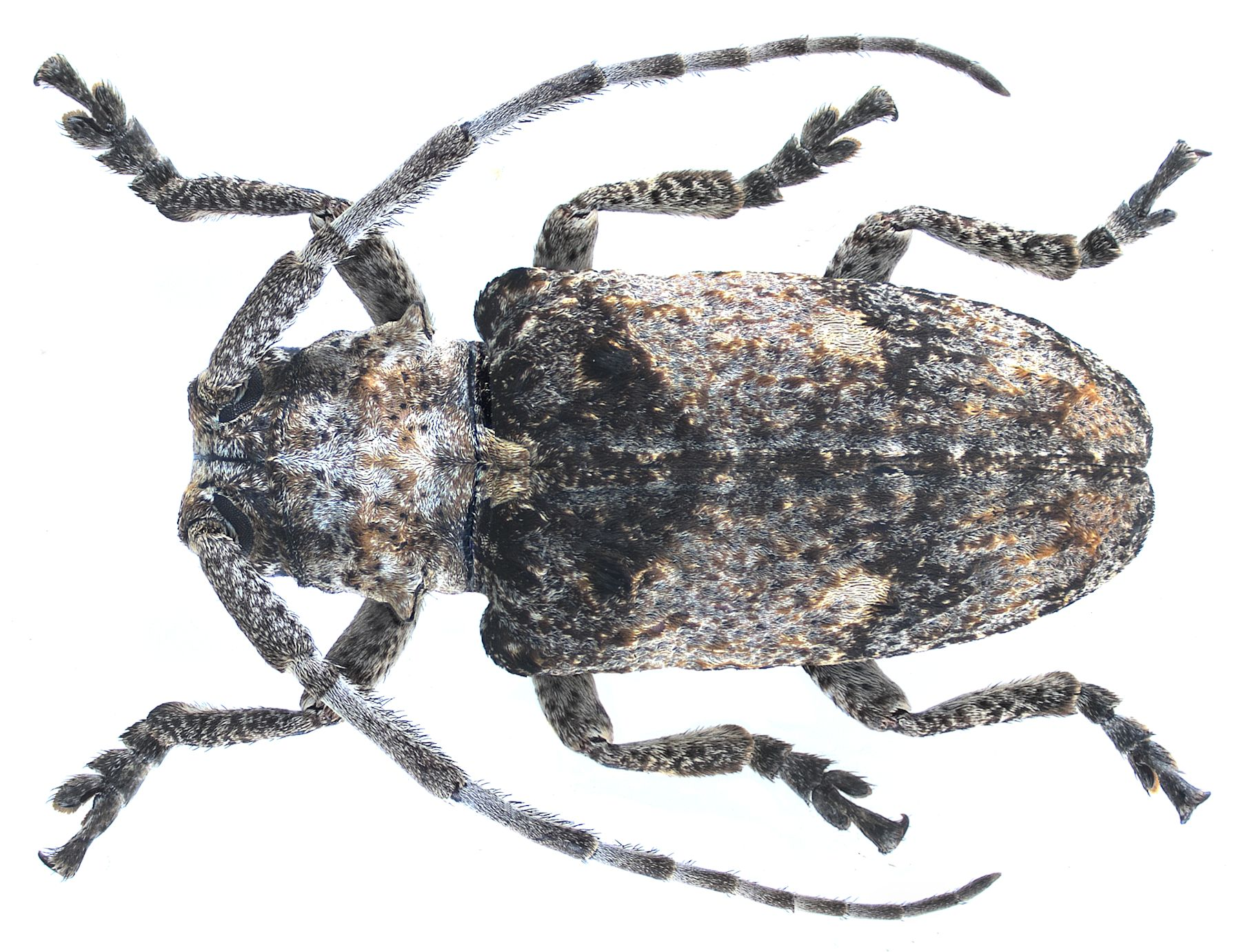
- Crossotus stypticus

Scientific classification
- Kingdom: Animalia
- Phylum: Arthropoda
- Clade: Pancrustacea
- Class: Insecta
- Order: Coleoptera
- Suborder: Polyphaga
- Infraorder: Cucujiformia
- Family: Cerambycidae
- Subfamily: Lamiinae
- Tribe: Crossotini; Thomson, 1864

= Crossotini =

Tribe of beetles

Crossotini is a tribe of longhorn beetles of the subfamily Lamiinae. It was described by Thomson in 1864.

== Taxonomy ==
- Apodasya Pascoe, 1863
- Biasmia Pascoe, 1864
- Biobessa Gahan, 1898
- Cincinnata Jordan, 1894
- Corus Pascoe, 1888
- Corynofrea Aurivillius, 1910
- Crossotus Audinet-Serville, 1835
- Dichostates Thomson, 1860
- Ecyroschema Thomson, 1864
- Epidichostates Teocchi & Sudre, 2003
- Epirochroa Fairmaire, 1896
- Epirochroides Breuning, 1942
- Falsobiobessa Breuning, 1942
- Frea Thomson, 1858
- Frearanova Breuning, 1958
- Freocorus Hunt & Breuning, 1955
- Freocrossotus Lepesme & Breuning, 1956
- Freopsis Hintz, 1912
- Freostathes Breuning, 1969
- Gasponia Fairmaire, 1893
- Geteuma Thomson, 1864
- Hecyra Thomson, 1857
- Hecyroides Breuning, 1938
- Hecyromorpha Breuning, 1942
- Lagrida Jordan, 1894
- Lasiocercis Waterhouse, 1882
- Leucographus Waterhouse, 1878
- Megalofrea Aurivillius, 1920
- Mimiculus Jordan, 1894
- Mimocorus Breuning, 1942
- Mimocrossotus Breuning, 1964
- Mimohecyra Breuning, 1966
- Mimomimiculus Breuning, 1970
- Mimomusonius Breuning, 1980
- Moechohecyra Breuning, 1938
- Moechotypa Thomson, 1864
- Musonius Fairmaire, 1902
- Mycerinus Thomson, 1865
- Neofreocorus Téocchi, 1988
- Neohecyra Breuning, 1936
- Niphecyra Kolbe, 1894
- Pallidohecyra Breuning, 1956
- Parabiobessa Breuning, 1936
- Paracorus Breuning, 1969
- Paracrossotus Breuning, 1969
- Paradichostathes Breuning, 1969
- Parafreoides Breuning, 1975
- Paragasponia Breuning, 1981
- Paramimiculus Breuning, 1964
- Paramusonius Breuning, 1980
- Paraphanis Breuning, 1977
- Parasophronicomimus Breuning, 1971
- Paratlepolemoides Breuning, 1962
- Parecyroschema Breuning, 1969
- Parhecyra Breuning, 1942
- Phanis Fairmaire, 1893
- Plectropygus Gahan, 1898
- Pseudhecyra Breuning, 1976
- Pseudocorus Breuning, 1960
- Pseudocrossotus Breuning, 1978
- Pseudofrea Breuning, 1978
- Pseudohecyra Breuning, 1942
- Ranova Thomson, 1864
- Sophronicomimus Breuning, 1957
- Stenideopsis Breuning, 1940
- Sthenopygus Breuning, 1938
- Tambusoides Breuning, 1955
- Tetradia Thomson, 1864
- Tlepolemoides Breuning, 1957
- Tlepolemus Thomson, 1864
- Trachyliopus Fairmaire, 1901
