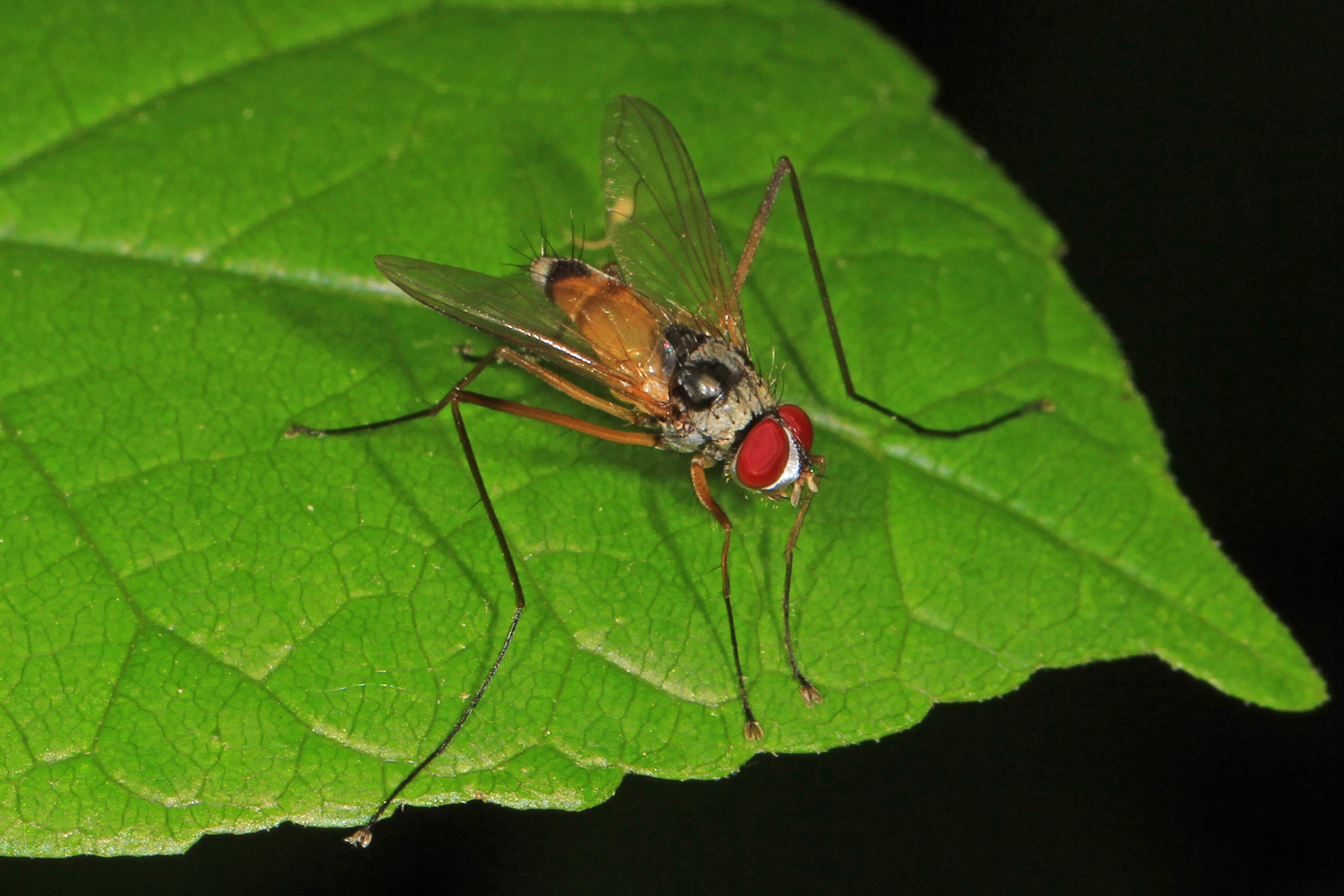
- Cholomyia inaequipes in Leesylvania State Park, Woodbridge, Virginia

Scientific classification
- Kingdom: Animalia
- Phylum: Arthropoda
- Class: Insecta
- Order: Diptera
- Family: Tachinidae
- Subfamily: Tachininae
- Tribe: Myiophasiini
- Genus: Cholomyia
- Species: C. inaequipes

Binomial name
- Cholomyia inaequipes Bigot, 1884

Synonyms
- Cholomyia nigriceps Williston, 1908; Thelairodes basalis Giglio-Tos, 1893

= Cholomyia inaequipes =

Species of fly

Cholomyia inaequipes is a species of bristle fly in the family Tachinidae.

== Hosts ==
- Conotrachelus affinis Boheman, 1837
- Conotrachelus aratus (Germar, 1824)
- Conotrachelus crataegi Walsh, 1863
- Conotrachelus elegans (Say, 1831)
- Conotrachelus juglandis Le Conte, 1876
- Conotrachelus naso Le Conte, 1876
- Conotrachelus nenuphar (Herbst, 1797)
- Conotrachelus posticatus Boheman, 1837
- Conotrachelus retencus Say, 1831

== Distribution ==
Canada, United States, Costa Rica, Guatemala, Mexico, Brazil, Colombia, Guyana, Peru, Venezuela.
