= Gnadochaeta metallica =

- Gnadochaeta metallica in Winterfield Elementary Charlotte (North Carolina)

Scientific classification
- Kingdom: Animalia
- Phylum: Arthropoda
- Clade: Pancrustacea
- Class: Insecta
- Order: Diptera
- Family: Tachinidae
- Subfamily: Tachininae
- Tribe: Myiophasiini
- Genus: Gnadochaeta
- Species: G. metallica

Binomial name
- Gnadochaeta metallica Townsend, 1891

Synonyms
- Phasioclista metallica Townsend, 1891

Species of fly

Gnadochaeta metallica is a species of bristle fly in the family Tachinidae.

== Distribution ==
Canada, United States, Mexico.
