= Gnadochaeta nigrifrons =

- Gnadochaeta nigrifrons

Scientific classification
- Kingdom: Animalia
- Phylum: Arthropoda
- Clade: Pancrustacea
- Class: Insecta
- Order: Diptera
- Family: Tachinidae
- Subfamily: Tachininae
- Tribe: Myiophasiini
- Genus: Gnadochaeta
- Species: G. nigrifrons

Binomial name
- Gnadochaeta nigrifrons Townsend, 1892

Synonyms
- Clista americana Townsend, 1892; Loewia nigrifrons Townsend, 1892

Species of fly

Gnadochaeta nigrifrons is a species of bristle fly in the family Tachinidae.

== Distribution ==
Canada, United States, Mexico.
