= Conotrachelus iowensis =

Scientific classification
- Kingdom: Animalia
- Phylum: Arthropoda
- Clade: Pancrustacea
- Class: Insecta
- Order: Coleoptera
- Suborder: Polyphaga
- Infraorder: Cucujiformia
- Superfamily: Curculionoidea
- Family: Curculionidae
- Genus: Conotrachelus
- Species: C. iowensis

Binomial name
- Conotrachelus iowensis Schoof, 1942

Species of beetle

Conotrachelus iowensis is a species in the family Curculionidae ("snout and bark beetles"), in the order Coleoptera ("beetles"). Conotrachelus iowensis is found in North America.
