= Crossotus strigifrons =

Scientific classification
- Kingdom: Animalia
- Phylum: Arthropoda
- Class: Insecta
- Order: Coleoptera
- Suborder: Polyphaga
- Infraorder: Cucujiformia
- Family: Cerambycidae
- Tribe: Crossotini
- Genus: Crossotus
- Species: C. strigifrons

Binomial name
- Crossotus strigifrons (Fairmaire, 1886)

Synonyms
- Crossotus albicans Breuning, 1942; Dichostates strigifrons Fairmaire, 1886; Dichostethes nebulosus Fairmaire, 1892

Species of beetle

Crossotus strigifrons is a species of beetle in the family Cerambycidae. It was described by Fairmaire in 1886. Its average lifespan is 2 years and its body is 12 – 18 mm in length.
