= Crossotus nebulosus =

Scientific classification
- Kingdom: Animalia
- Phylum: Arthropoda
- Class: Insecta
- Order: Coleoptera
- Suborder: Polyphaga
- Infraorder: Cucujiformia
- Family: Cerambycidae
- Tribe: Crossotini
- Genus: Crossotus
- Species: C. nebulosus

Binomial name
- Crossotus nebulosus (Fairmaire, 1892)

Species of beetle

Crossotus nebulosus is a species of beetle in the family Cerambycidae. It was described by Fairmaire in 1892.
