= Crossotus barbatus =

Scientific classification
- Domain: Eukaryota
- Kingdom: Animalia
- Phylum: Arthropoda
- Class: Insecta
- Order: Coleoptera
- Suborder: Polyphaga
- Infraorder: Cucujiformia
- Family: Cerambycidae
- Genus: Crossotus
- Species: C. barbatus

Binomial name
- Crossotus barbatus Gerstaecker, 1871

Synonyms
- Crossotus basalis Gahan, 1898

Species of beetle

Crossotus barbatus is a species of beetle in the family Cerambycidae. It was described by Carl Eduard Adolph Gerstaecker in 1871.
