= Gnadochaeta =

Scientific classification
- Kingdom: Animalia
- Phylum: Arthropoda
- Class: Insecta
- Order: Diptera
- Family: Tachinidae
- Subfamily: Tachininae
- Tribe: Myiophasiini
- Genus: Gnadochaeta; Macquart, 1850

Type species
- Gnadochoeta coerulea Macquart, 1850

Synonyms
- Angiorhina Brauer & von Berganstamm, 1889; Ennyomma Townsend, 1891; Ennyommopsis Townsend, 1915; Euloewia Townsend, 1915; Gnathochaeta Gerstaecker, 1856; Megaeuloewia Townsend, 1919; Myiophasia Brauer & von Berganstamm, 1891; Phasioclista Townsend, 1891

Genus of flies

Gnadochaeta is a genus of flies in the family Tachinidae.

== Species ==
- Gnadochaeta antennalis (Aldrich, 1934)
- Gnadochaeta atra (Brauer & von Berganstamm, 1893)
- Gnadochaeta australis (Townsend, 1916)
- Gnadochaeta clistoides (Townsend, 1891)
- Gnadochoeta coerulea Macquart, 1851
- Gnadochaeta crudelis (Wiedemann, 1830)
- Gnadochaeta difficilis (Aldrich, 1934)
- Gnadochaeta flava (Coquillett, 1900)
- Gnadochaeta fulvicornis (Zetterstedt, 1849)
- Gnadochaeta globosa (Townsend, 1892)
- Gnadochaeta harpi (Reinhard, 1974)
- Gnadochaeta lasia (Reinhard, 1959)
- Gnadochaeta madera (Townsend, 1915)
- Gnadochaeta madrensis (Townsend, 1915)
- Gnadochaeta mesensis (Townsend, 1915)
- Gnadochaeta metallica (Townsend, 1891)
- Gnadochaeta morinioides (Townsend, 1919)
- Gnadochaeta muscaeformis (Wulp, 1890)
- Gnadochaeta neomexicana (Townsend, 1915)
- Gnadochaeta nigrifrons (Townsend, 1892)
- Gnadochaeta ochreicornis (Townsend, 1916)
- Gnadochaeta oregonensis (Townsend, 1915)
- Gnadochaeta pollinosa (Curran, 1926)
- Gnadochaeta pruinosa (Herting, 1973)
- Gnadochaeta puncticeps (Zetterstedt, 1859)
- Gnadochaeta robusta (Coquillett, 1897)
- Gnadochaeta ruficornis (Townsend, 1892)
- Gnadochaeta setigera (Townsend, 1908)
- Gnadochaeta sierricola (Townsend, 1915)
- Gnadochaeta sigilla (Reinhard, 1959)
- Gnadochaeta solitaria (Aldrich, 1934)
