= Crossotus albofasciculatus =

Scientific classification
- Kingdom: Animalia
- Phylum: Arthropoda
- Clade: Pancrustacea
- Class: Insecta
- Order: Coleoptera
- Suborder: Polyphaga
- Infraorder: Cucujiformia
- Family: Cerambycidae
- Tribe: Crossotini
- Genus: Crossotus
- Species: C. albofasciculatus

Binomial name
- Crossotus albofasciculatus Breuning, 1971

Species of beetle

Crossotus albofasciculatus is a species of beetle in the family Cerambycidae. It was described by Breuning in 1971.
