= Crossotus bifasciatus =

Scientific classification
- Domain: Eukaryota
- Kingdom: Animalia
- Phylum: Arthropoda
- Class: Insecta
- Order: Coleoptera
- Suborder: Polyphaga
- Infraorder: Cucujiformia
- Family: Cerambycidae
- Genus: Crossotus
- Species: C. bifasciatus

Binomial name
- Crossotus bifasciatus Kolbe, 1900

Species of beetle

Crossotus bifasciatus is a species of beetle in the family Cerambycidae. It was described by Kolbe in 1900.
