= Crossotus saxosicollis =

Scientific classification
- Kingdom: Animalia
- Phylum: Arthropoda
- Class: Insecta
- Order: Coleoptera
- Suborder: Polyphaga
- Infraorder: Cucujiformia
- Family: Cerambycidae
- Tribe: Crossotini
- Genus: Crossotus
- Species: C. saxosicollis

Binomial name
- Crossotus saxosicollis Fairmaire, 1893

Species of beetle

Crossotus saxosicollis is a species of beetle in the family Cerambycidae. It was described by Fairmaire in 1893.
