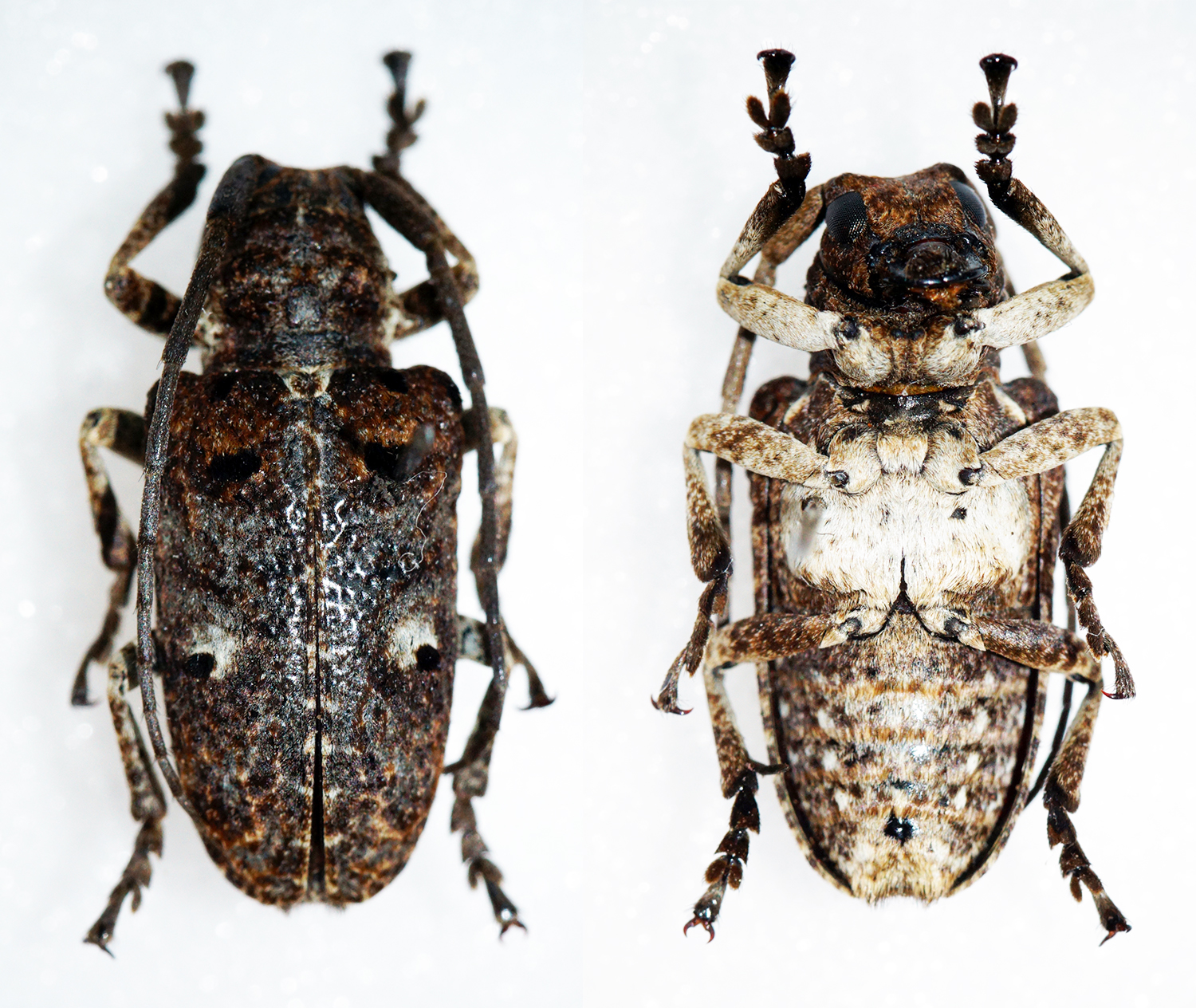

Scientific classification
- Kingdom: Animalia
- Phylum: Arthropoda
- Class: Insecta
- Order: Coleoptera
- Suborder: Polyphaga
- Infraorder: Cucujiformia
- Family: Cerambycidae
- Tribe: Crossotini
- Genus: Crossotus
- Species: C. tubericollis

Binomial name
- Crossotus tubericollis (Fairmaire, 1886)

Synonyms
- Crossotus bimaculatus Aurivillius, 1903; Crossotus robustus Jordan, 1894; Dichostathes tubericollis Fairmaire, 1891

= Crossotus tubericollis =

Species of beetle

Crossotus tubericollis is a species of beetle in the family Cerambycidae. It was described by Fairmaire in 1886. It is known from Benin, Ethiopia, Cameroon, the Democratic Republic of the Congo, Mozambique, Gambia, the Central African Republic, Morocco, Eritrea, Malawi, Mali, Namibia, the Ivory Coast, Nigeria, Niger, Senegal, Tanzania, the Western Sahara, Sudan, and Zambia.
