= Crossotus xanthoneurus =

Scientific classification
- Domain: Eukaryota
- Kingdom: Animalia
- Phylum: Arthropoda
- Class: Insecta
- Order: Coleoptera
- Suborder: Polyphaga
- Infraorder: Cucujiformia
- Family: Cerambycidae
- Genus: Crossotus
- Species: C. xanthoneurus

Binomial name
- Crossotus xanthoneurus Sama, 2000

Species of beetle

Crossotus xanthoneurus is a species of beetle in the family Cerambycidae. It was described by Sama in 2000. It is known from Egypt, Jordan and Israel.
