= Crossotus katbeh =

Scientific classification
- Domain: Eukaryota
- Kingdom: Animalia
- Phylum: Arthropoda
- Class: Insecta
- Order: Coleoptera
- Suborder: Polyphaga
- Infraorder: Cucujiformia
- Family: Cerambycidae
- Genus: Crossotus
- Species: C. katbeh

Binomial name
- Crossotus katbeh Sama, 1999

Species of beetle

Crossotus katbeh is a species of beetle in the family Cerambycidae. It was described by Sama in 1999. It is known from Jordan.
