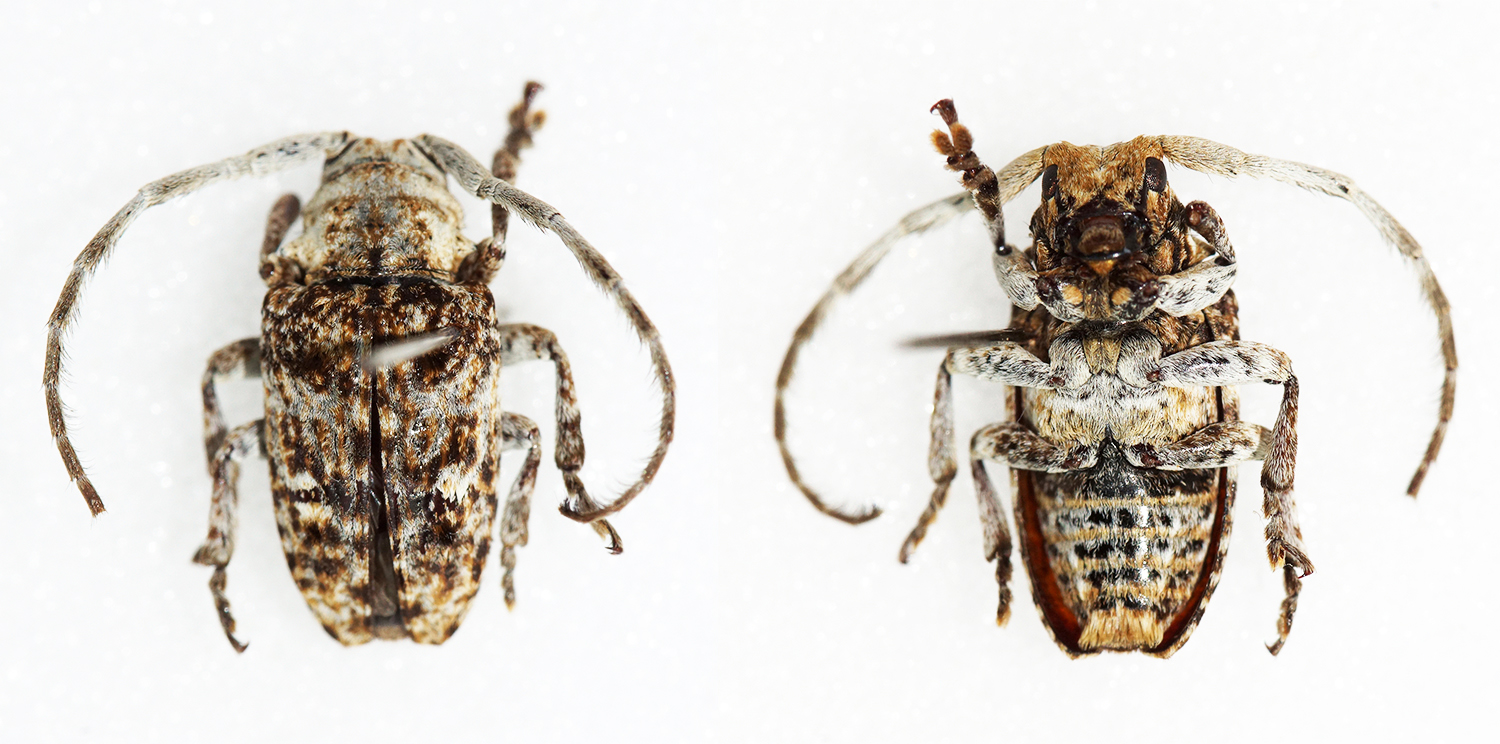

Scientific classification
- Kingdom: Animalia
- Phylum: Arthropoda
- Class: Insecta
- Order: Coleoptera
- Suborder: Polyphaga
- Infraorder: Cucujiformia
- Family: Cerambycidae
- Tribe: Crossotini
- Genus: Crossotus
- Species: C. vagepictus

Binomial name
- Crossotus vagepictus (Fairmaire, 1886)

Synonyms
- Crossotus adenensis Breuning, 1969; Crossotus lateralis Hintz, 1912; Crossotus obliquevittatus Breuning, 1940

= Crossotus vagepictus =

Species of beetle

Crossotus vagepictus is a species of beetle in the family Cerambycidae. It was described by Fairmaire in 1886. It contains the varietas Crossotus vagepictus var. niveicollis.
