= Crossotus inermis =

Scientific classification
- Kingdom: Animalia
- Phylum: Arthropoda
- Class: Insecta
- Order: Coleoptera
- Suborder: Polyphaga
- Infraorder: Cucujiformia
- Family: Cerambycidae
- Tribe: Crossotini
- Genus: Crossotus
- Species: C. inermis

Binomial name
- Crossotus inermis Breuning, 1935

Synonyms
- Inermocrossotus medioalbus Breuning, 1977

Species of beetle

Crossotus inermis is a species of beetle in the family Cerambycidae. It was described by Stephan von Breuning in 1935.
