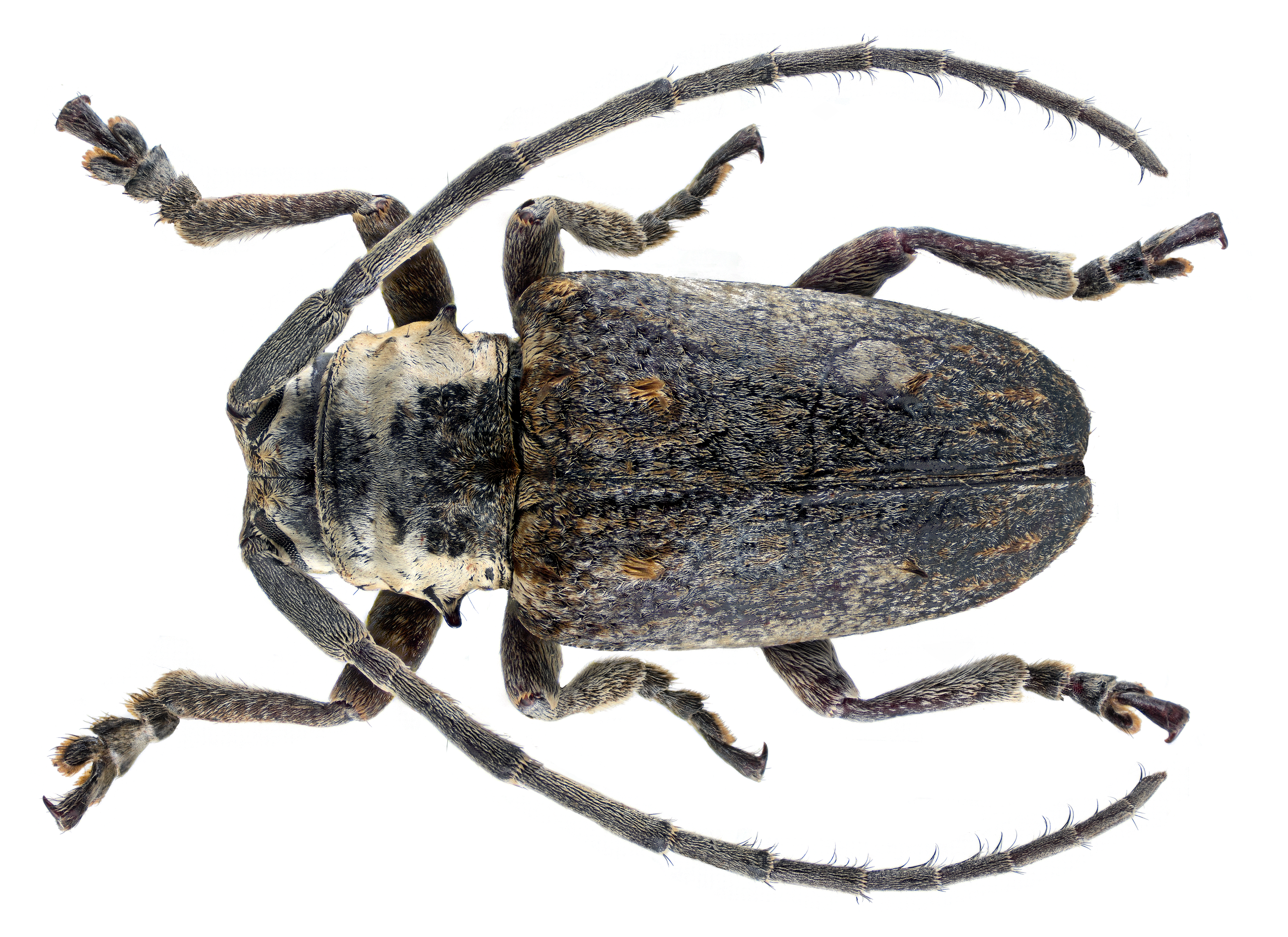

Scientific classification
- Domain: Eukaryota
- Kingdom: Animalia
- Phylum: Arthropoda
- Class: Insecta
- Order: Coleoptera
- Suborder: Polyphaga
- Infraorder: Cucujiformia
- Family: Cerambycidae
- Genus: Crossotus
- Species: C. argenteus

Binomial name
- Crossotus argenteus Hintz, 1912

= Crossotus argenteus =

Species of beetle

Crossotus argenteus is a species of beetle in the family Cerambycidae. It was described by Hintz in 1912.
