= Conotrachelus integer =

Scientific classification
- Kingdom: Animalia
- Phylum: Arthropoda
- Clade: Pancrustacea
- Class: Insecta
- Order: Coleoptera
- Suborder: Polyphaga
- Infraorder: Cucujiformia
- Superfamily: Curculionoidea
- Family: Curculionidae
- Genus: Conotrachelus
- Species: C. integer

Binomial name
- Conotrachelus integer Casey, 1892

Species of beetle

Conotrachelus integer is a species of true weevil in the beetle family Curculionidae. It is found in North America.
