= Crossotus albicollis =

Scientific classification
- Kingdom: Animalia
- Phylum: Arthropoda
- Clade: Pancrustacea
- Class: Insecta
- Order: Coleoptera
- Suborder: Polyphaga
- Infraorder: Cucujiformia
- Family: Cerambycidae
- Tribe: Crossotini
- Genus: Crossotus
- Species: C. albicollis

Binomial name
- Crossotus albicollis Guérin-Méneville, 1844

Synonyms
- Crossotus obtusus Hintz, 1912; Crossotus senegalensis Breuning, 1950

Species of beetle

Crossotus albicollis is a species of beetle in the family Cerambycidae. It was described by Félix Édouard Guérin-Méneville in 1844. It is known from Ethiopia, Burkina Faso, Chad, the Central African Republic, Ghana, Ivory Coast, Cameroon, Senegal, Mali, Morocco, Niger, Nigeria, Kenya, Mauritania, and Western Sahara.
