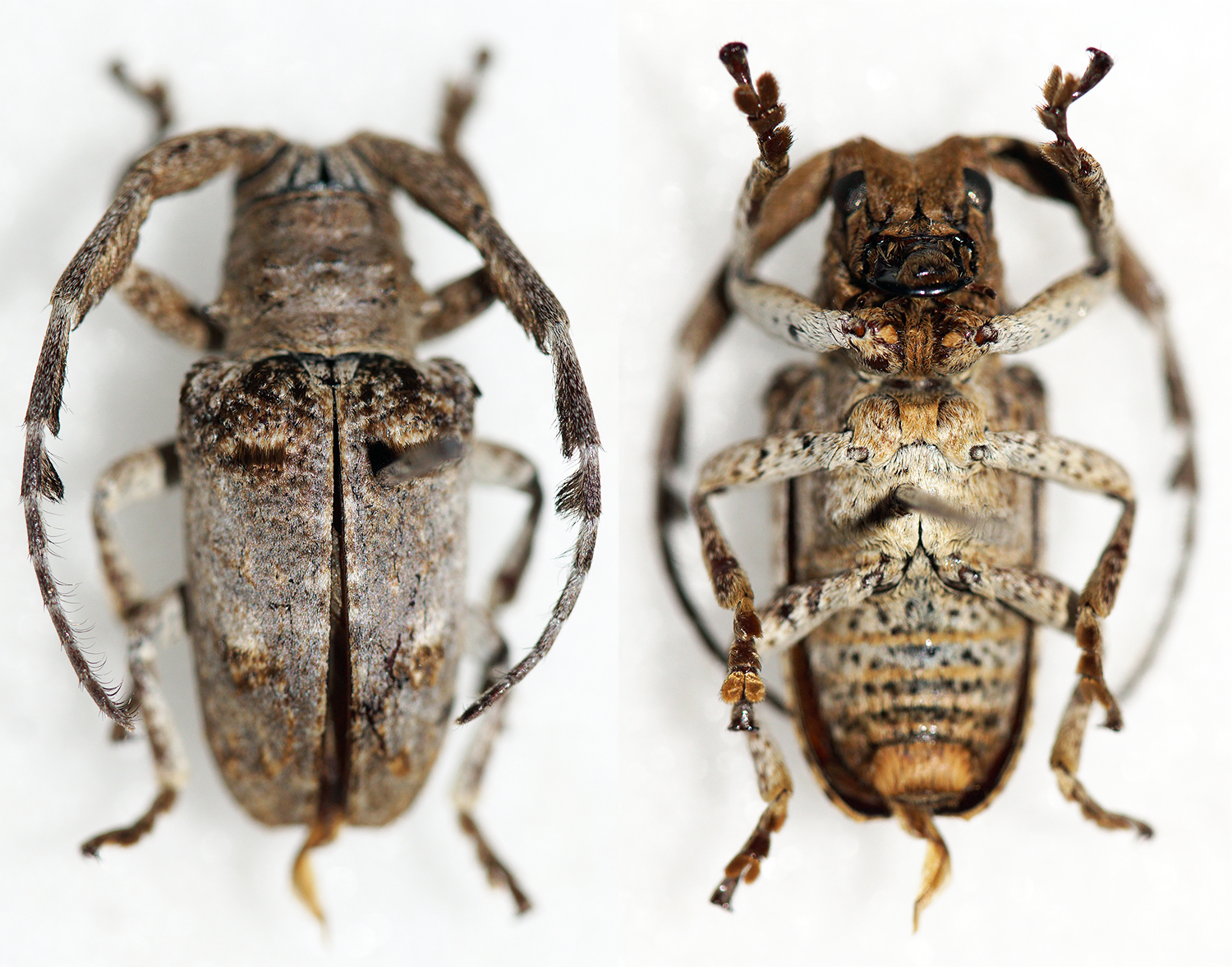

Scientific classification
- Domain: Eukaryota
- Kingdom: Animalia
- Phylum: Arthropoda
- Class: Insecta
- Order: Coleoptera
- Suborder: Polyphaga
- Infraorder: Cucujiformia
- Family: Cerambycidae
- Genus: Crossotus
- Species: C. plumicornis

Binomial name
- Crossotus plumicornis Audinet-Serville, 1835

Synonyms
- Crossotus excavatipennis Breuning, 1961; Crossotus natalensis White, 1858; Crossotus plumicornis damarensis Hintz, 1912; Crossotus vestiticornis Fairmaire, 1882

= Crossotus plumicornis =

Species of beetle

Crossotus plumicornis is a species of beetle in the family Cerambycidae. It was described by Audinet-Serville in 1835. It is known from Botswana, Chad, Ethiopia, Guinea, Mauritania, Burkina Faso, Ivory Coast, Malawi, Mali, Mozambique, South Africa, Kenya, Namibia, Eritrea, Senegal, Somalia, Tanzania, Sudan, Zambia, Uganda, and Zimbabwe.
