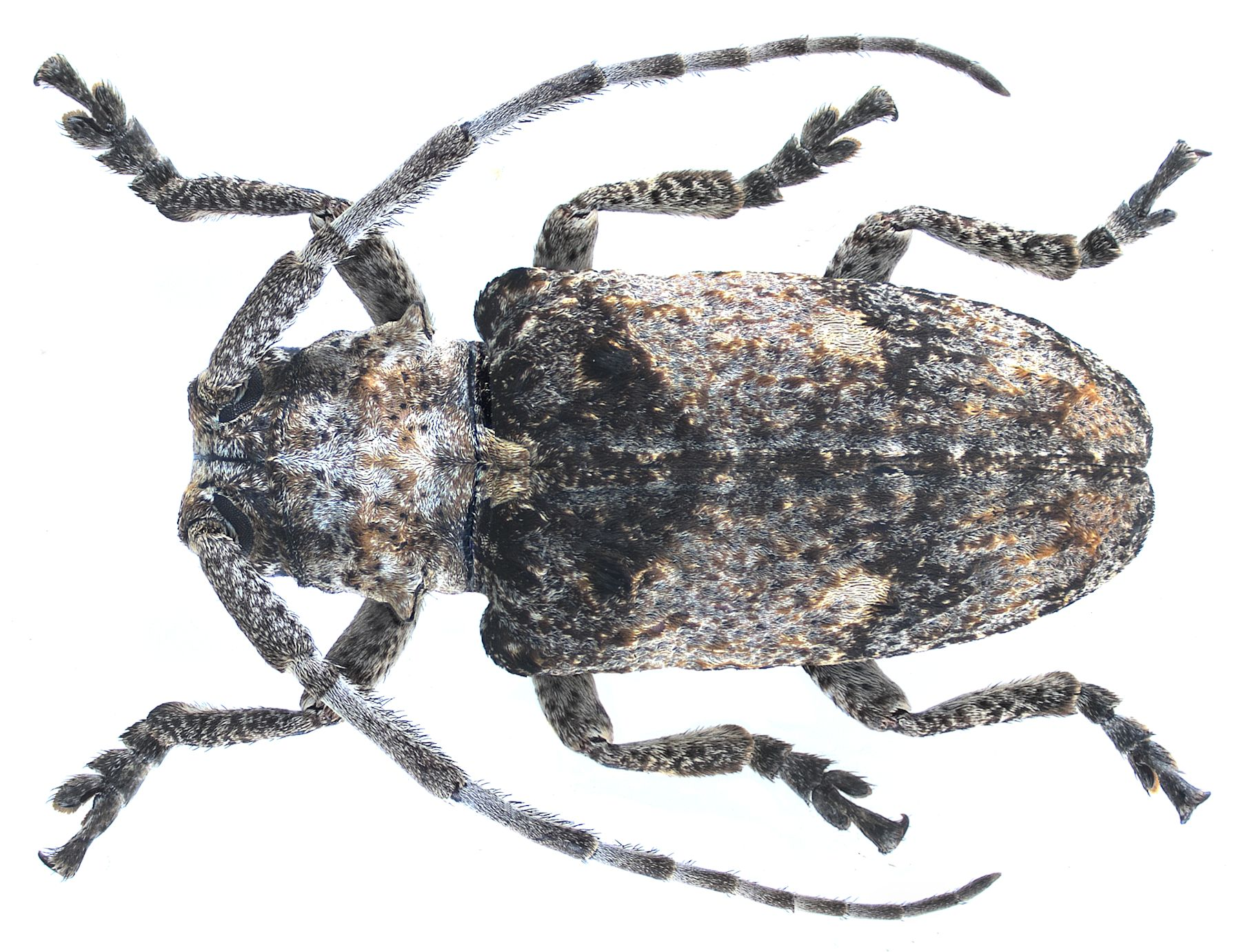
- Crossotus stypticus

Scientific classification
- Kingdom: Animalia
- Phylum: Arthropoda
- Class: Insecta
- Order: Coleoptera
- Suborder: Polyphaga
- Infraorder: Cucujiformia
- Family: Cerambycidae
- Subfamily: Lamiinae
- Genus: Crossotus

= Crossotus =

Genus of beetles

Crossotus is a genus of longhorn beetles of the subfamily Lamiinae.

- Crossotus albicollis Guérin-Méneville, 1844
- Crossotus albofasciculatus Breuning, 1971
- Crossotus arabicus Gahan, 1896
- Crossotus argenteus Hintz, 1912
- Crossotus barbatus Gerstäcker, 1871
- Crossotus bifasciatus Kolbe, 1900
- Crossotus brunneopictus (Fairmaire, 1891)
- Crossotus capucinus (Gerstäcker, 1884)
- Crossotus erlangeri Hintz, 1912
- Crossotus falzonii Breuning, 1943
- Crossotus freoides Breuning, 1938
- Crossotus genalis Aurivillius, 1913
- Crossotus inermis Breuning, 1935
- Crossotus katbeh Sama, 1999
- Crossotus klugi Distant, 1892
- Crossotus nebulosus (Fairmaire, 1892)
- Crossotus plumicornis Audinet-Serville, 1835
- Crossotus plurifasciculatus Breuning, 1938
- Crossotus pseudostypticus Breuning, 1956
- Crossotus saxosicollis Fairmaire, 1893
- Crossotus schoutedeni Breuning, 1935
- Crossotus stigmaticus (Fahraeus, 1872)
- Crossotus strigifrons (Fairmaire, 1886)
- Crossotus stypticus Pascoe, 1869
- Crossotus sublineatus Gestro, 1892
- Crossotus subocellatus (Fairmaire, 1886)
- Crossotus tubericollis (Fairmaire, 1886)
- Crossotus ugandae Breuning, 1936
- Crossotus vagepictus (Fairmaire, 1886)
- Crossotus xanthoneurus Sama, 2000
