= Crossotus klugi =

Scientific classification
- Domain: Eukaryota
- Kingdom: Animalia
- Phylum: Arthropoda
- Class: Insecta
- Order: Coleoptera
- Suborder: Polyphaga
- Infraorder: Cucujiformia
- Family: Cerambycidae
- Genus: Crossotus
- Species: C. klugi

Binomial name
- Crossotus klugi Distant, 1892

Synonyms
- Crossotus (Crossotides) oculatus Hintz, 1912; Crossotus flavolineatus Breuning, 1938; Megalofrea transvaalensis Breuning, 1981

Species of beetle

Crossotus klugi is a species of beetle in the family Cerambycidae. It was described by William Lucas Distant in 1892. It is known from Botswana, South Africa, Namibia, Mozambique, and Zimbabwe.
