= Conotrachelus retentus =

Scientific classification
- Kingdom: Animalia
- Phylum: Arthropoda
- Clade: Pancrustacea
- Class: Insecta
- Order: Coleoptera
- Suborder: Polyphaga
- Infraorder: Cucujiformia
- Superfamily: Curculionoidea
- Family: Curculionidae
- Genus: Conotrachelus
- Species: C. retentus

Binomial name
- Conotrachelus retentus (Say, 1831)

Species of beetle

Conotrachelus retentus, the black walnut curculio, is a species of true weevil in the beetle family Curculionidae. It is found in North America. Larvae feed on the developing walnut, while adults feed on foliage. Adult weevils rarely leave the tree they were born on.
