= Schwarzalia =

Scientific classification
- Kingdom: Animalia
- Phylum: Arthropoda
- Clade: Pancrustacea
- Class: Insecta
- Order: Diptera
- Family: Tachinidae
- Subfamily: Tachininae
- Tribe: Myiophasiini
- Genus: Schwarzalia; Curran, 1934

Type species
- Schwarzalia luteipennis Curran, 1934

Genus of flies

Schwarzalia is a genus of flies in the family Tachinidae.

== Species ==
- Schwarzalia luteipennis Curran, 1934

== Distribution ==
It is found in Panama.
