= Cesapanama =

Scientific classification
- Kingdom: Animalia
- Phylum: Arthropoda
- Class: Insecta
- Order: Diptera
- Family: Tachinidae
- Subfamily: Tachininae
- Tribe: Myiophasiini
- Genus: Cesapanama; Koçak & Kemal, 2010
- Species: C. pulchra

Binomial name
- Cesapanama pulchra (Townsend, 1919)

Synonyms
- Parazelia Townsend, 1919

Genus of flies

Cesapanama is a genus of flies in the family Tachinidae. It contains only a single species, Cesapanama pulchra. It is found in Mexico and Panama.
