= Crossotus stigmaticus =

Scientific classification
- Domain: Eukaryota
- Kingdom: Animalia
- Phylum: Arthropoda
- Class: Insecta
- Order: Coleoptera
- Suborder: Polyphaga
- Infraorder: Cucujiformia
- Family: Cerambycidae
- Genus: Crossotus
- Species: C. stigmaticus

Binomial name
- Crossotus stigmaticus (Fahraeus, 1872)

Species of beetle

Crossotus stigmaticus is a species of beetle in the family Cerambycidae. It was described by Fahraeus in 1872.
