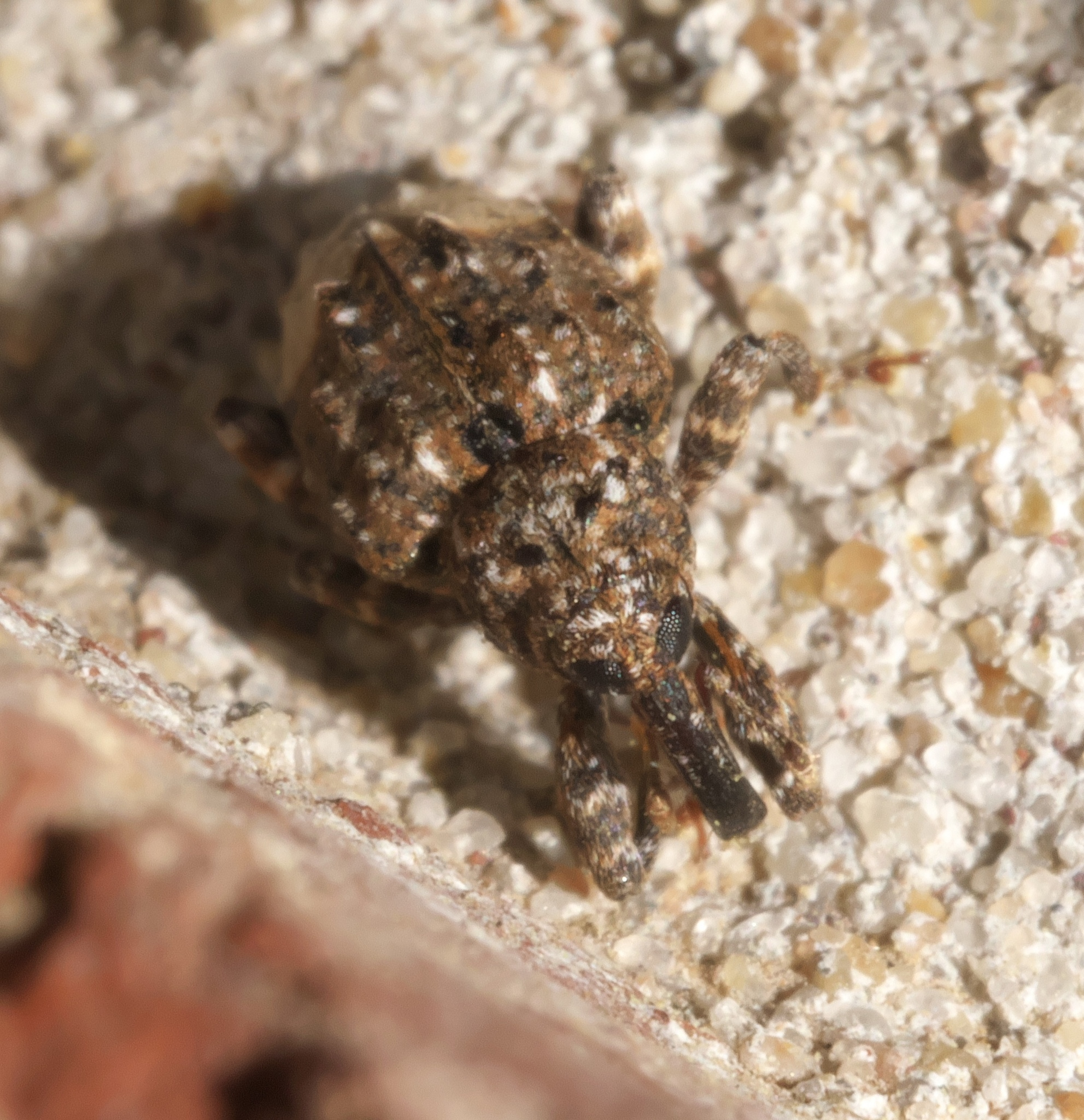
- Conotrachelus buchanani, Oklahoma

Scientific classification
- Kingdom: Animalia
- Phylum: Arthropoda
- Clade: Pancrustacea
- Class: Insecta
- Order: Coleoptera
- Suborder: Polyphaga
- Infraorder: Cucujiformia
- Superfamily: Curculionoidea
- Family: Curculionidae
- Genus: Conotrachelus
- Species: C. buchanani

Binomial name
- Conotrachelus buchanani Schoof, 1942

= Conotrachelus buchanani =

Species of beetle

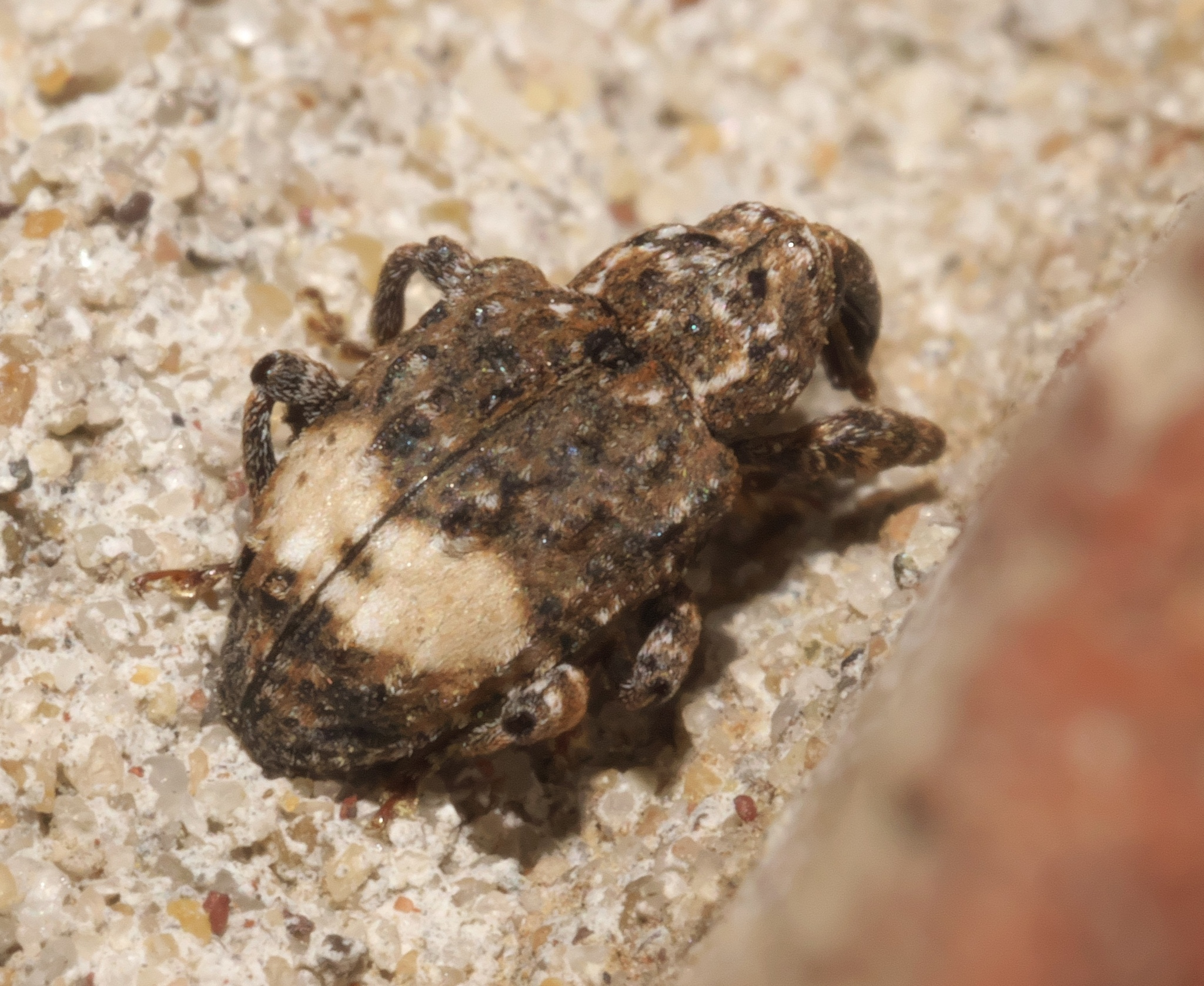
Conotrachelus buchanani, Oklahoma

Conotrachelus buchanani is a species in the family Curculionidae ("snout and bark beetles"), in the order Coleoptera ("beetles"). Conotrachelus buchanani is found in North America. It is associated with Celtis occidentalis.
