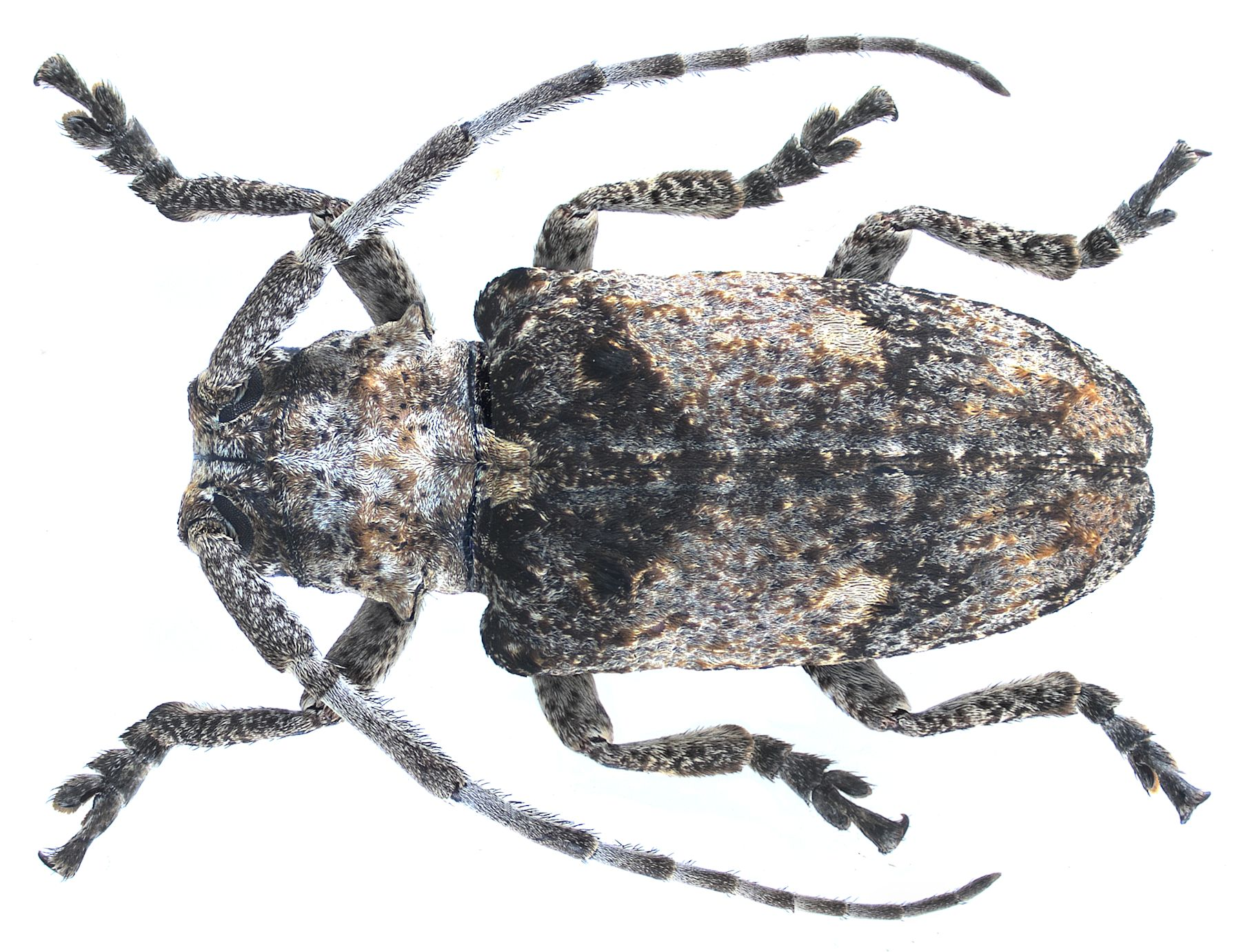

Scientific classification
- Domain: Eukaryota
- Kingdom: Animalia
- Phylum: Arthropoda
- Class: Insecta
- Order: Coleoptera
- Suborder: Polyphaga
- Infraorder: Cucujiformia
- Family: Cerambycidae
- Genus: Crossotus
- Species: C. stypticus

Binomial name
- Crossotus stypticus Pascoe, 1869

Synonyms
- Crossotus (Crossotides) meridionalis Hintz, 1912; Sumeloides forchhammeri Breuning, 1986

= Crossotus stypticus =

Species of beetle

Crossotus stypticus is a species of beetle in the family Cerambycidae. It was described by Francis Polkinghorne Pascoe in 1869. It is known from Mozambique, Botswana, South Africa, Namibia, and Tanzania.

== Subspecies ==
- Crossotus stypticus aethiops Distant, 1898
- Crossotus stypticus stypticus Pascoe, 1869
