= Crossotus subocellatus =

Scientific classification
- Kingdom: Animalia
- Phylum: Arthropoda
- Clade: Pancrustacea
- Class: Insecta
- Order: Coleoptera
- Suborder: Polyphaga
- Infraorder: Cucujiformia
- Family: Cerambycidae
- Tribe: Crossotini
- Genus: Crossotus
- Species: C. subocellatus

Binomial name
- Crossotus subocellatus (Fairmaire, 1886)

Synonyms
- Crossotus heimschi Peyerimhoff, 1922; Crossotus philippsi Gahan, 1896; Dichostates subocellatus Fairmaire, 1886

Species of beetle

Crossotus subocellatus is a species of beetle in the family Cerambycidae. It was described by Fairmaire in 1886. It is known from Djibouti, Algeria, Chad, Senegal, Eritrea, Kenya, Egypt, Libya, Mali, Mauritania, Saudi Arabia, Ethiopia, Morocco, Oman, Niger, Nigeria, Somalia, Tunisia, Sudan, and the Western Sahara. It feeds on Acacia tortilis.
