= Myiophasiomima =

Scientific classification
- Kingdom: Animalia
- Phylum: Arthropoda
- Class: Insecta
- Order: Diptera
- Family: Tachinidae
- Subfamily: Tachininae
- Tribe: Myiophasiini
- Genus: Myiophasiomima; Blanchard, 1966

Type species
- Myiophasiomima lloydi Blanchard, 1966

Genus of flies

Myiophasiomima is a genus of flies in the family Tachinidae.

== Species ==
- Myiophasiomima lloydi Blanchard, 1966
