= Crossotus sublineatus =

Scientific classification
- Domain: Eukaryota
- Kingdom: Animalia
- Phylum: Arthropoda
- Class: Insecta
- Order: Coleoptera
- Suborder: Polyphaga
- Infraorder: Cucujiformia
- Family: Cerambycidae
- Genus: Crossotus
- Species: C. sublineatus

Binomial name
- Crossotus sublineatus Gestro, 1892

Synonyms
- Crossotus marshalli Breuning, 1935; Crossotus sahariensis Breuning, 1938; Crossotus sennaarensis Hintz, 1912; Crossotus somaliensis Breuning, 1972; Crossotus stypticus sahariensis (Breuning) Téocchi, 1998

Species of beetle

Crossotus sublineatus is a species of beetle in the family Cerambycidae. It was described by Gestro in 1892. It is known from Chad, Algeria, Mauritania, Djibouti, Ethiopia, Somalia, Mali, Morocco, Kenya, Niger, Senegal, and Sudan.
