= Crossotus capucinus =

Scientific classification
- Domain: Eukaryota
- Kingdom: Animalia
- Phylum: Arthropoda
- Class: Insecta
- Order: Coleoptera
- Suborder: Polyphaga
- Infraorder: Cucujiformia
- Family: Cerambycidae
- Genus: Crossotus
- Species: C. capucinus

Binomial name
- Crossotus capucinus (Gerstaecker, 1884)

Synonyms
- Dichostastes capucinus Gerstaecker, 1884

Species of beetle

Crossotus capucinus is a species of beetle in the family Cerambycidae. It was described by Carl Eduard Adolph Gerstaecker in 1884.
