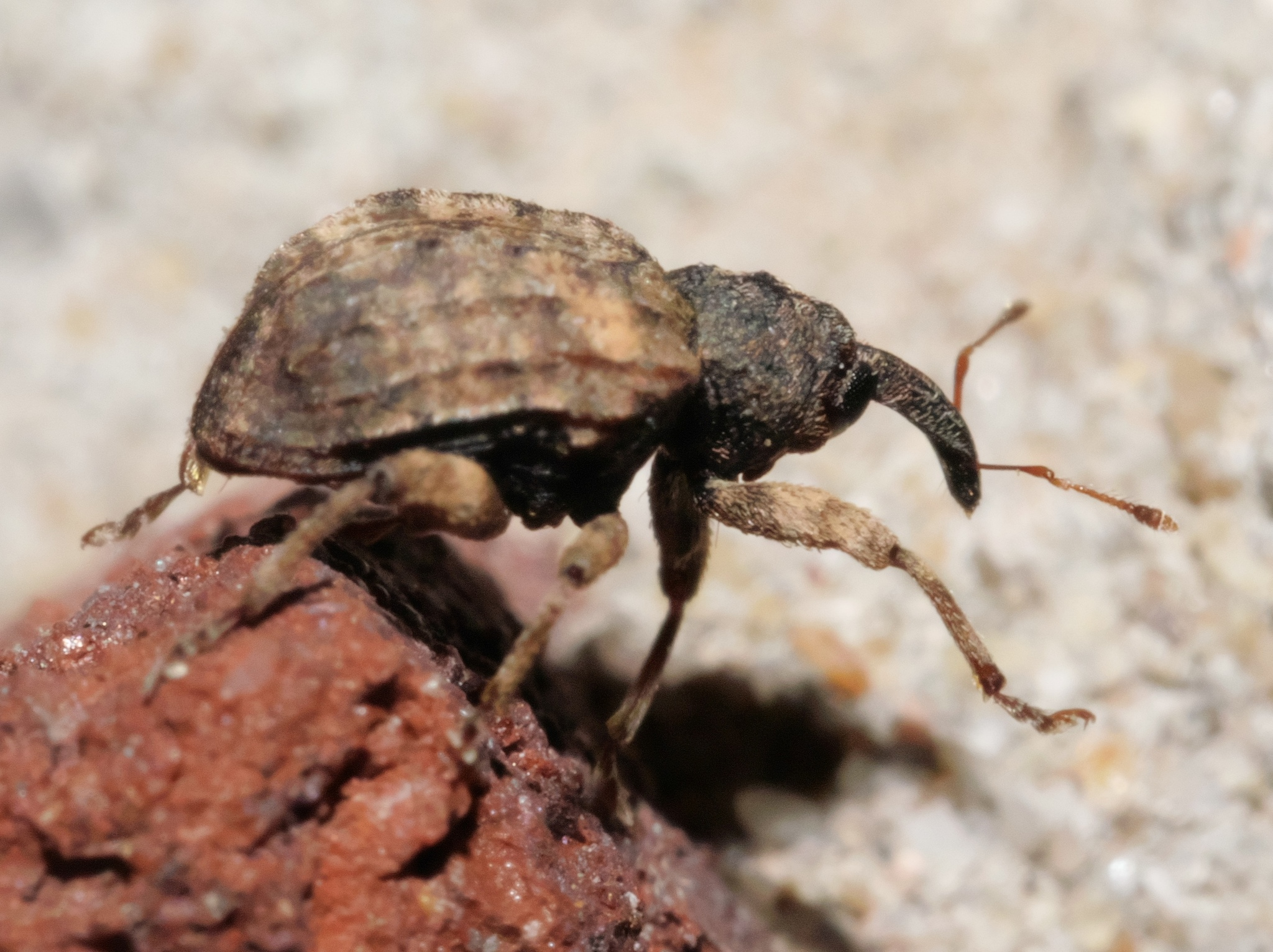
- Conotrachelus anaglypticus, Oklahoma

Scientific classification
- Kingdom: Animalia
- Phylum: Arthropoda
- Clade: Pancrustacea
- Class: Insecta
- Order: Coleoptera
- Suborder: Polyphaga
- Infraorder: Cucujiformia
- Superfamily: Curculionoidea
- Family: Curculionidae
- Genus: Conotrachelus
- Species: C. anaglypticus

Binomial name
- Conotrachelus anaglypticus (Say, 1831)

Synonyms
- Conotrachelus rubiginosus Boheman, 1845

= Conotrachelus anaglypticus =

Species of beetle

Conotrachelus anaglypticus, the cambium curculio, is a species of true weevil in the beetle family Curculionidae. It is found in North America.
