= Crossotus pseudostypticus =

Scientific classification
- Kingdom: Animalia
- Phylum: Arthropoda
- Class: Insecta
- Order: Coleoptera
- Suborder: Polyphaga
- Infraorder: Cucujiformia
- Family: Cerambycidae
- Tribe: Crossotini
- Genus: Crossotus
- Species: C. pseudostypticus

Binomial name
- Crossotus pseudostypticus Breuning, 1956

Species of beetle

Crossotus pseudostypticus is a species of beetle in the family Cerambycidae. It was described by Breuning in 1956.
