= Euloewiopsis =

Scientific classification
- Kingdom: Animalia
- Phylum: Arthropoda
- Class: Insecta
- Order: Diptera
- Family: Tachinidae
- Subfamily: Tachininae
- Tribe: Myiophasiini
- Genus: Euloewiopsis; Townsend, 1917

Type species
- Euloewiopsis setosa Townsend, 1917

Synonyms
- Xystotrixa Townsend, 1927

Genus of flies

Euloewiopsis is a genus of flies in the family Tachinidae.

== Species ==
- Euloewiopsis anthracina (Wiedemann, 1830)

== Distribution ==
Brazil.
