= Crossotus ugandae =

Scientific classification
- Kingdom: Animalia
- Phylum: Arthropoda
- Class: Insecta
- Order: Coleoptera
- Suborder: Polyphaga
- Infraorder: Cucujiformia
- Family: Cerambycidae
- Tribe: Crossotini
- Genus: Crossotus
- Species: C. ugandae

Binomial name
- Crossotus ugandae Breuning, 1936

Synonyms
- Crossotus crassepunctatus Breuning, 1942; Crossotus ovalis Breuning, 1938

Species of beetle

Crossotus ugandae is a species of beetle in the family Cerambycidae. It was described by Breuning in 1936. It is known from Kenya and Somalia.
