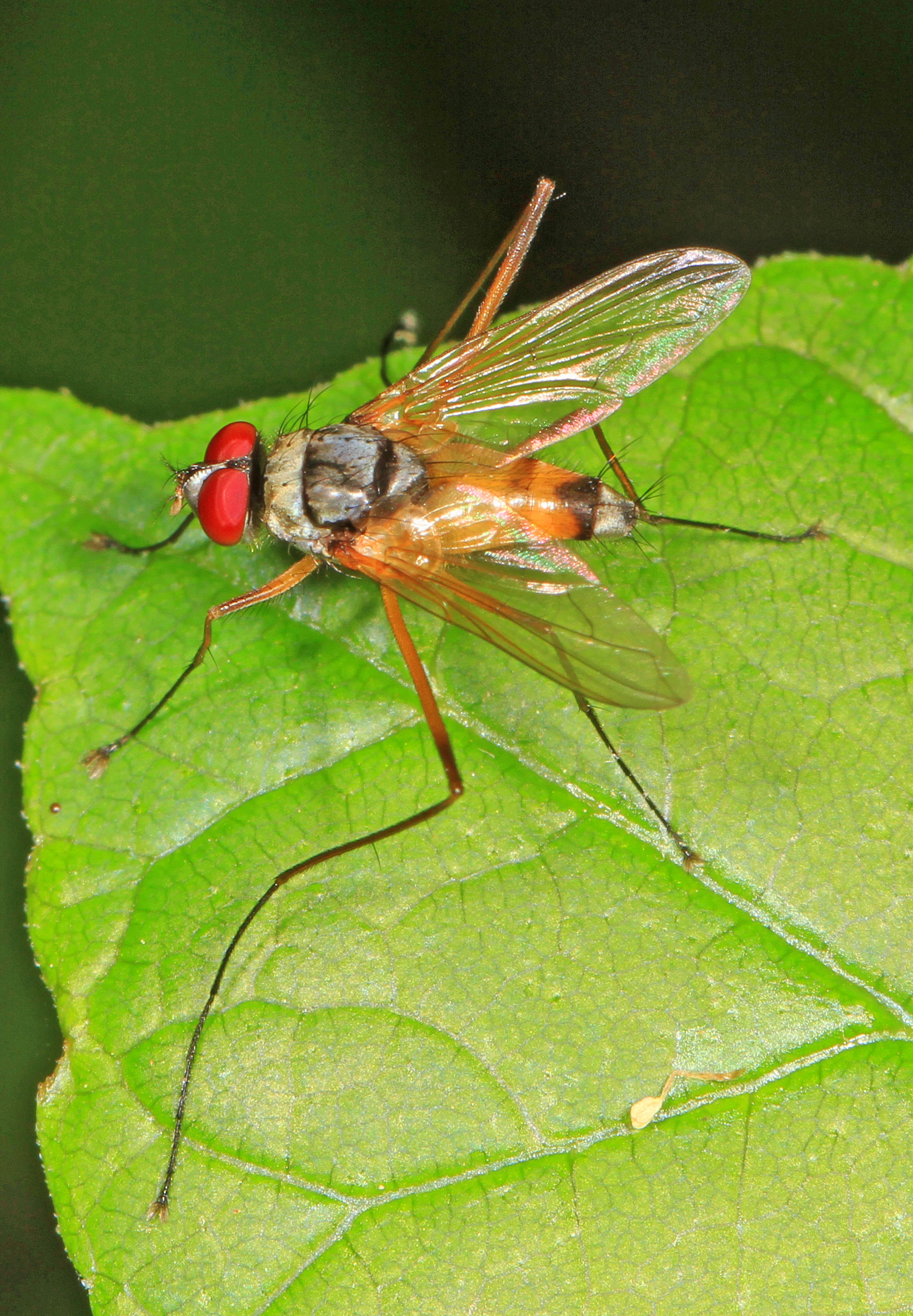
- Cholomyia inaequipes

Scientific classification
- Kingdom: Animalia
- Phylum: Arthropoda
- Class: Insecta
- Order: Diptera
- Family: Tachinidae
- Subfamily: Tachininae
- Tribe: Myiophasiini
- Genus: Cholomyia; Bigot, 1884

Type species
- Cholomyia inaequipes Bigot, 1884

Synonyms
- Acromiodexia Townsend, 1931

= Cholomyia =

Genus of flies

Cholomyia is a genus of flies in the family Tachinidae.

== Species ==
- Cholomyia acromion (Wiedemann, 1824)
- Cholomyia filipes (Walker, 1858)
- Cholomyia inaequipes Bigot, 1884
- Cholomyia zumbadoi Santis & Nihei, 2016
