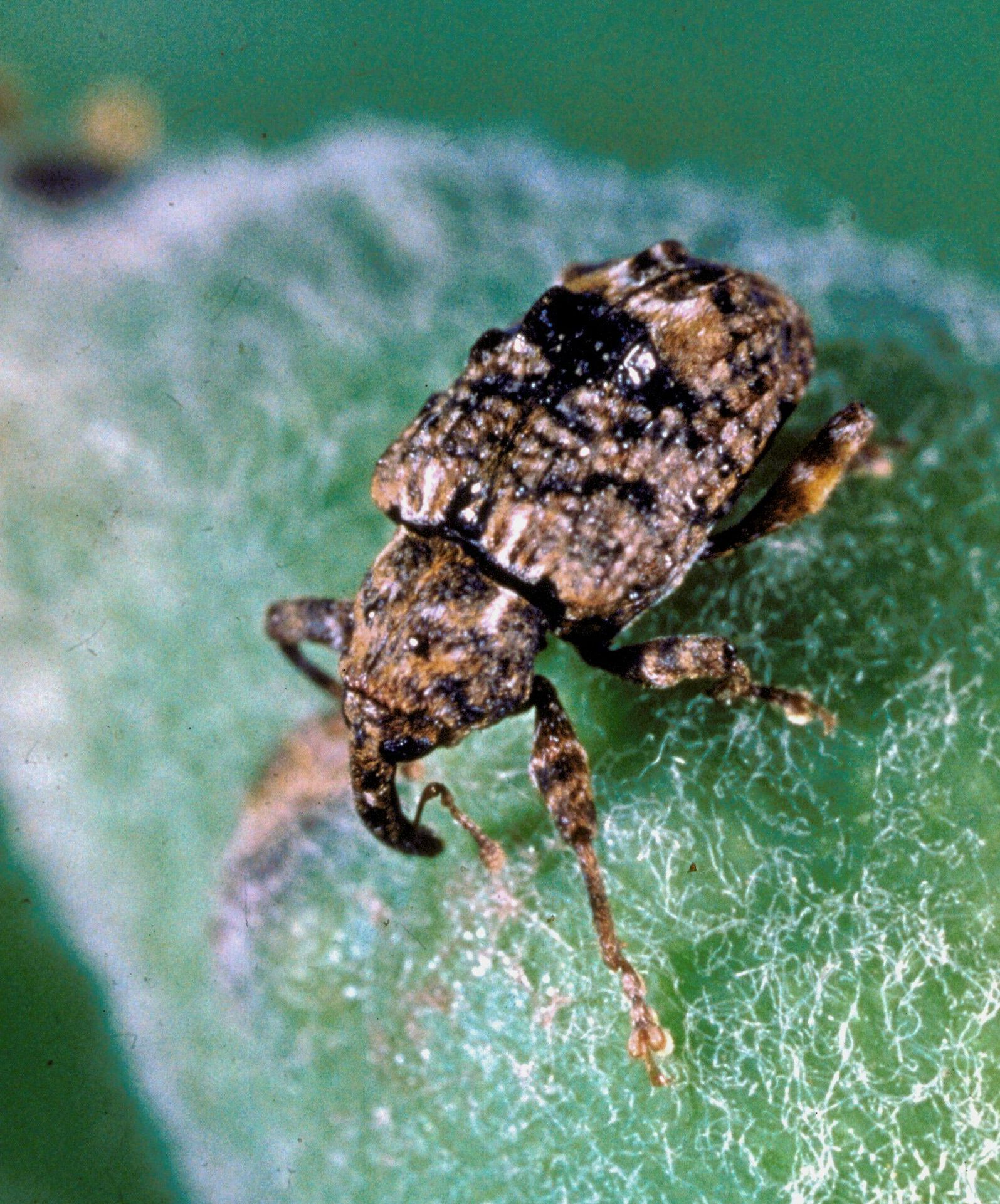
- Conotrachelus nenuphar, the plum curculio

Scientific classification
- Domain: Eukaryota
- Kingdom: Animalia
- Phylum: Arthropoda
- Class: Insecta
- Order: Coleoptera
- Suborder: Polyphaga
- Infraorder: Cucujiformia
- Family: Curculionidae
- Subfamily: Molytinae
- Tribe: Conotrachelini
- Genus: Conotrachelus; Dejean, 1835

= Conotrachelus =

Genus of beetles

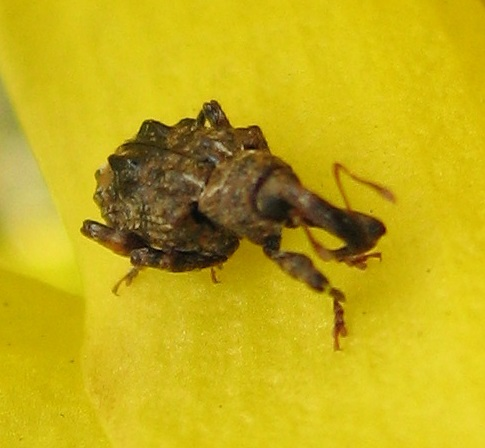
Conotrachelus nenuphar on forsythia flower

Conotrachelus is a genus of true weevils in the family Curculionidae. It is a very large genus with well over 1,000 species, several of which are pests of fruit crops. Found from Canada to Argentina.

== Species ==
- Conotrachelus adspersus
- Conotrachelus affinis
- Conotrachelus albicinctus
- Conotrachelus anaglypticus
- Conotrachelus aratus
- Conotrachelus arizonicus
- Conotrachelus asperatus
- Conotrachelus belfragei
- Conotrachelus biscaynensis
- Conotrachelus buchanani
- Conotrachelus cameronensis
- Conotrachelus carinifer
- Conotrachelus carolinensis
- Conotrachelus cognatus
- Conotrachelus compositus
- Conotrachelus confinis
- Conotrachelus conotracheloides
- Conotrachelus corni
- Conotrachelus coronatus
- Conotrachelus crataegi
- Conotrachelus cristatus
- Conotrachelus duplex
- Conotrachelus ecarinatus
- Conotrachelus echinatus
- Conotrachelus elegans
- Conotrachelus erinaceus
- Conotrachelus falli
- Conotrachelus fissunguis
- Conotrachelus floridanus
- Conotrachelus geminatus
- Conotrachelus hayesi
- Conotrachelus hicoriae
- Conotrachelus humeropictus
- Conotrachelus integer
- Conotrachelus invadens
- Conotrachelus iowensis
- Conotrachelus juglandis
- Conotrachelus leucophaetus
- Conotrachelus lucanus
- Conotrachelus maritimus
- Conotrachelus naso
- Conotrachelus nenuphar
- Conotrachelus neomexicanus
- Conotrachelus nigromaculatus
- Conotrachelus nivosus
- Conotrachelus obesulus
- Conotrachelus pecanae
- Conotrachelus posticatus
- Conotrachelus pusillus
- Conotrachelus recessus
- Conotrachelus retentus
- Conotrachelus retusus
- Conotrachelus rotundus
- Conotrachelus rubescens
- Conotrachelus schoofi
- Conotrachelus seniculus
- Conotrachelus serpentinus
- Conotrachelus setiferous
- Conotrachelus similis
- Conotrachelus texanus
- Conotrachelus tuberculicollis
- Conotrachelus tuberosus
