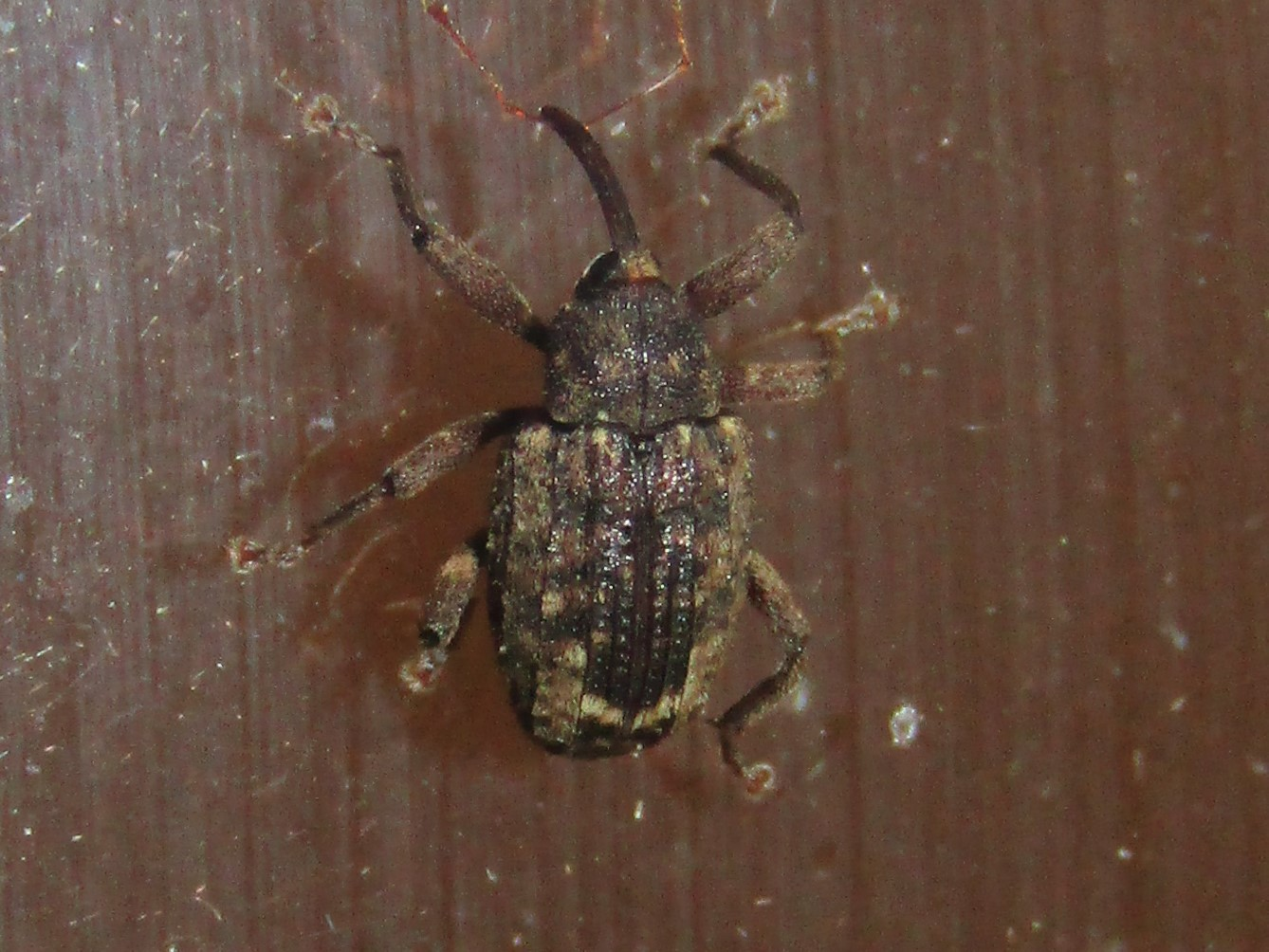

Scientific classification
- Kingdom: Animalia
- Phylum: Arthropoda
- Clade: Pancrustacea
- Class: Insecta
- Order: Coleoptera
- Suborder: Polyphaga
- Infraorder: Cucujiformia
- Superfamily: Curculionoidea
- Family: Curculionidae
- Genus: Conotrachelus
- Species: C. posticatus

Binomial name
- Conotrachelus posticatus Boheman, 1837

= Conotrachelus posticatus =

Species of beetle

Conotrachelus posticatus is a species of true weevil within the beetle family Curculionidae. C. posticatus is found in North America. It is on average 3.7–5 mm (0.15–0.20 in) long and is found from North America (particularly in Minnesota, Florida, and Texas) to Panama. It breeds in acorns and its larvae are found within them and use them as food. C. posticatus has had a growing presence within oak trees, which they attack by destroying seeds within the tree.Their activity in relation to oak trees and forest ecosystems is not yet fully understood.

== Background description ==
Conotrachelus posticatus is prevalent throughout the regions of North America, especially from Minnesota to Texas, and can be found as south as Panama. The head is described as being "densely punctate". It has a long "nose" that bears some resemblance to the trunk of an elephant. The nose has a chewing mouth piece at its end, allowing for it to process food. C. posticatus is brown and/or black in color. In its adult stage the color is described as a "dark reddish-brown."

C. posticatus uses acorns as a food source in its larval and adult stages. Acorns are also used as nurseries for the larvae. Females tend to lay their eggs into the seeds of oak trees and larvae feed on the inside of the seed.

C. posticatus breeds in the acorns of nine different species of oak trees, and the eggs are often deposited in damaged acorns. The larval stage lasts between 10 and 30 days. The weevil spends its second winter under leaves on the ground as an adult. C. posticatus seems to be related to C. naso both in range and in how eggs are deposited.

The insect remains hidden from its predators during the winter underneath the soil, after it has chewed into the hole of an acorn seed. The natural relationship between C. posticatus and the acorn seed can pose a threat to the oak trees. Therefore, predators of C. posticatus reduce the threat it poses to oak trees.

C. posticatus uses a stridulatory mechanism to produce sound. This is done by scraping the elytral stridulitra and the plectra together to produce frequencies. There are demonstrable differences that exist between the stridulations of this beetle and other beetles within its genus. Individual beetles are capable of several different speeds and frequencies of stridulations. Sound production can be induced by agitation or rough handling of the beetles.

== Life history ==
Research on C. posticatus has historically focused on acorns in Ohio, but has since expanded to include more oak trees in the U.S. Larvae of C. posticatus go through 5 instars, where they emerge in 14 days from bur oak acorns and 30 days from black acorns. It has been observed that the emergence method, cell formation, prepupal and pupal activity patterns of C. posticatus are similar to those of C. naso larvae.

Additionally, research has found that C. posticatus larvae spend the winter within the soil, while the adults tend to hibernate underneath leaves. Adult C. posticatus emerge in the late spring and early summer, where it "oviposits in acorns, and passes the second winter as an adult." However, researchers were unable to determine for how long individuals survive after their second winter. It was also noted that there is very little information on the biology of C. posticatus, but that it was similar to C. naso, as they both are found in areas like Panama. Much of this study was done to examine the longevity and adult emergence of C. posticatus, and their breeding activity in Crataegus fruits, fresh hickory nuts, and black oak acorns. The results showed that most of the C. posticatus beetles would feed, lay their eggs, and produce the most larvae in the black oak acorns. Research suggests that C. posticatus seems to adapt, use, and occupy acorns as a resource for survival.

== Conotrachelus and acorns ==
The Conotrachelus weevils were seen as "secondary acorn predators" in one study, yet they were also noted to help regenerate bottomland forests, because they "outwinter as adults and infest 20-65% of spring-germinating acorns on the soil surface". Even though the Conotrachelus beetle may cause harm to acorns, it can also pose a benefit to the regeneration of the forest.

== C. posticatus and other Contrachelus species ==
C. posticatus has been regarded as one of the seven species of Curculionidae to threaten the avocado industry.

Research has suggested that C. posticatus resembles Conotrachelus lobatus (also found in North America, in northern Mexico). The species also resembles C. carinifer and C. naso as they "all have…longitudinal median prothoracic carina; mesosternum with anterolateral angles truncate and prominent".

Confusion between Curculionidae species may have significant implications in the introduction of invasive species and in determining which species may cause environmental harm or damage to the ecosystem.
