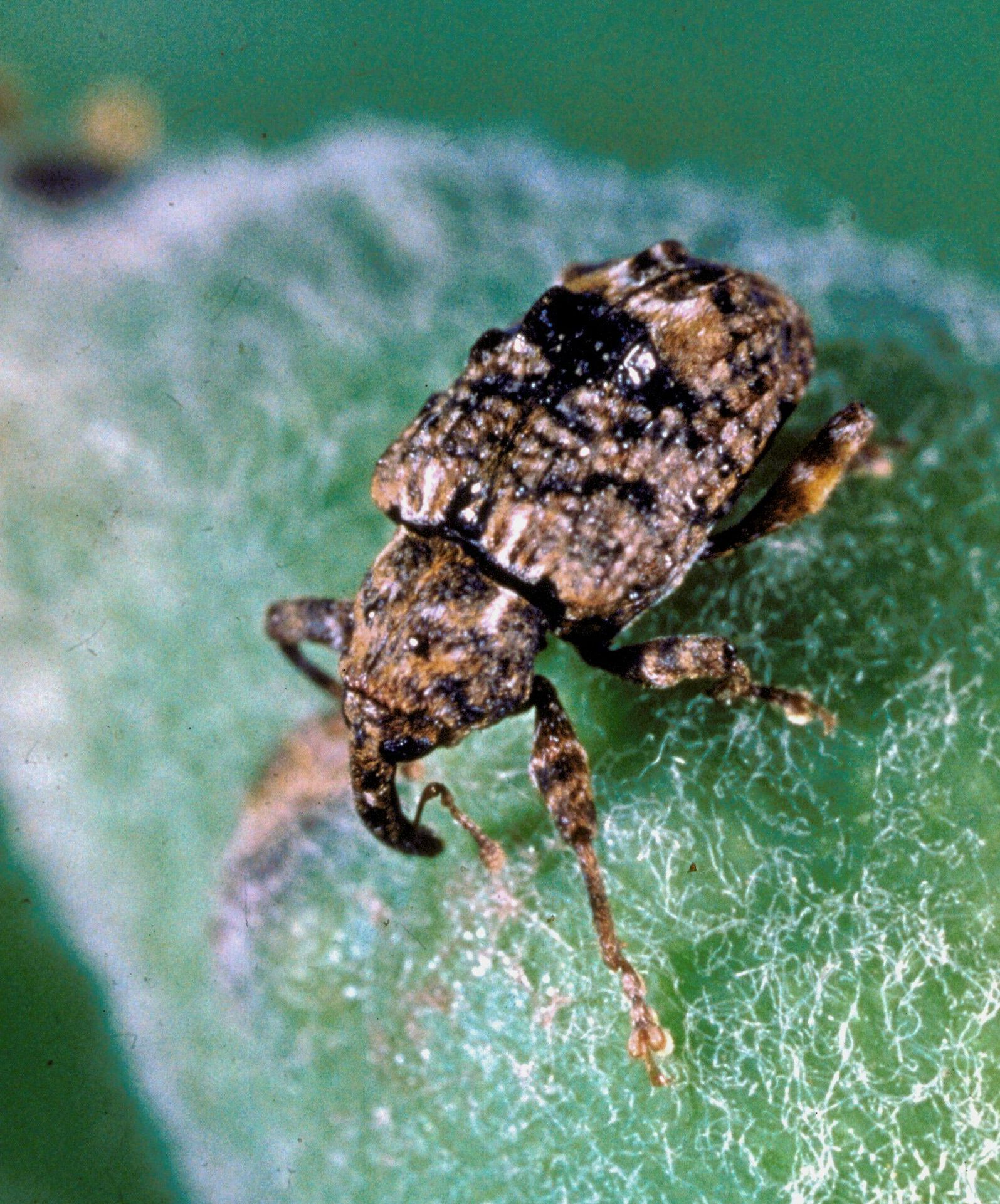

Scientific classification
- Kingdom: Animalia
- Phylum: Arthropoda
- Clade: Pancrustacea
- Class: Insecta
- Order: Coleoptera
- Suborder: Polyphaga
- Infraorder: Cucujiformia
- Superfamily: Curculionoidea
- Family: Curculionidae
- Genus: Conotrachelus
- Species: C. nenuphar

Binomial name
- Conotrachelus nenuphar (Herbst, 1797)

= Plum curculio =

Species of beetle

The plum curculio (Conotrachelus nenuphar) is a true weevil native to the regions east of the Rocky Mountains in the United States and Canada. It is notorious for destroying fruits if left uncontrolled.

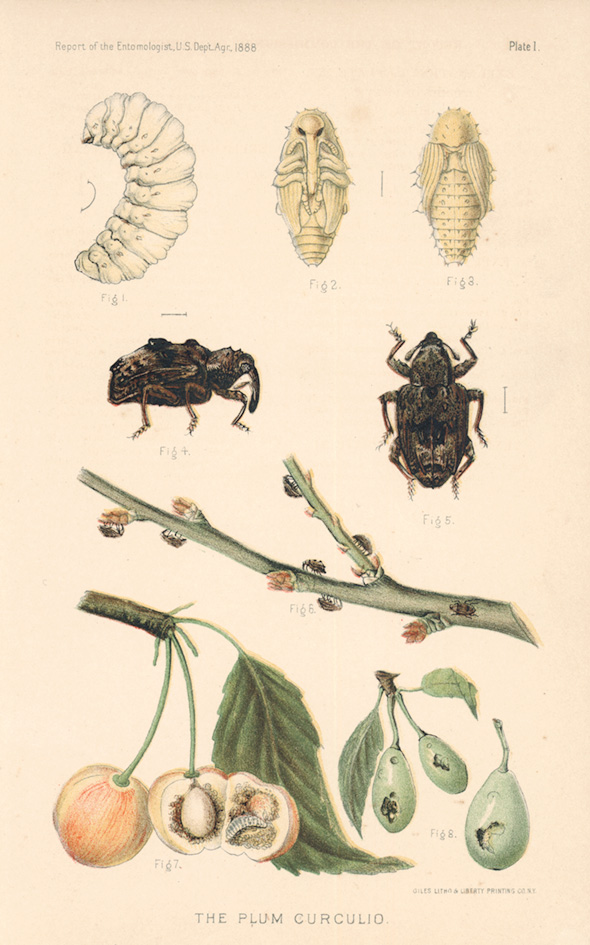
Life cycle of the plum curculio and damage it causes to fruit

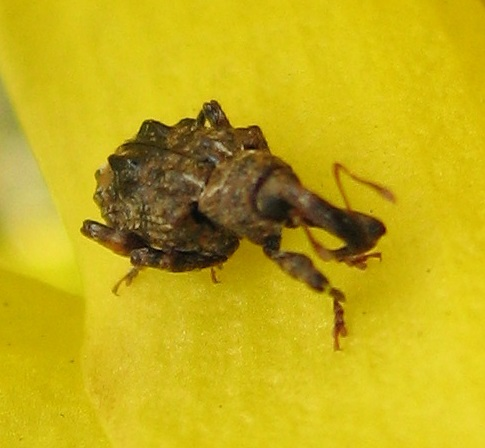
On forsythia flower

== Life stages ==
A female curculio uses a number of hosts to lay her eggs in, including plums, peaches, apples, pears, and other pome and stone fruits as well as blueberries. After the female has chosen a suitable host, she will build an egg chamber under the fruit skin to receive the egg. She then turns around and places the egg in the cavity. Next, she slices a curved slit underneath the egg cavity, leaving the egg in a flap of flesh and causing a crescent-shaped scar on the outside of the fruit. Without this curved slit, eggs are killed by pressure from the growth of the host fruit. There are four larval instars.

There is a univoltine "northern strain" and multivoltine "southern strain" of plum curculio, with the two strains being largely reproductively incompatible due to different Wolbachia strains affecting each population. The line between the northern and southern strains of plum curculio is around New Jersey and West Virginia. In the univoltine strain, the overwintering adults lay eggs around late April to May and die. The eggs develop into larvae, then pupae, and emerge as adults around mid-July to August and then go overwinter.

== Appearance ==
Plum curculio larvae are typically 6 to 9 mm long when fully grown, when they reach the pupal stage measuring about 5 to 7 mm; all adult characteristics are visible in this stage prior to transformation. Adult plum curculio are about 4 to 6 mm long and have a small, rough snout colored with black, gray, and brown specks. Four pairs of ridges cover the wings; however, because of the middle humps they appear to have only two ridges.

== Hosts ==
The plum curculio can be found in apple, nectarine, plum, cherry, peach, apricot, pear, quince, and blueberry. It may also survive on wild plum, hawthorn, and crabapple. Females may oviposit on other plants, regardless of if the beetle larvae can survive on them. It is found most commonly in areas east of the Rocky Mountains and in eastern Canada. The beetles are most active during the spring time when the weather is warm, damp, and cloudy. They are often seen in heavy leafed trees, and overwinter in woods.

== Injury or damage to fruit ==
Plum curculio beetles can cause irreparable damage to a fruit harvest. In badly damaged fruit, one can identify large scars and bumps due to feeding. Most internally damaged fruit (through burrowing into the fruit) drops prematurely.

== Control ==
Control of the plum curculio is fairly easy to maintain. Traps, often containing benzaldehyde, can be used to determine the presence of the plum curculio in an orchard. Application of proper insecticide during the pink and petal-fall stages of apples, also the petal-fall and shuck-split stages in peaches and cherries is usually enough to reduce plum curculio damage to a minimum. An important preventative measure is destroying the fallen, damaged host fruits before the adults emerge. Pest management at petal fall is also of particular importance. There have also been examples of using a trap tree or bush in apple or blueberry systems for plum curculio control.
