= Conotrachelus aratus =

Conservation status
- Unranked (NatureServe)

Scientific classification
- Kingdom: Animalia
- Phylum: Arthropoda
- Clade: Pancrustacea
- Class: Insecta
- Order: Coleoptera
- Suborder: Polyphaga
- Infraorder: Cucujiformia
- Superfamily: Curculionoidea
- Family: Curculionidae
- Genus: Conotrachelus
- Species: C. aratus

Binomial name
- Conotrachelus aratus (Germar, 1824)

Synonyms
- Cryptorhynchus aratus Germar 1824

Species of beetle

Conotrachelus aratus, the hickory shoot curculio or ploughed pure weevil, is a species of snout or bark beetle in the family Curculionidae. It occurs in the United States east of Texas and Kansas and in Quebec, Canada. It is associated with Carya species.
