= Conotrachelus elegans =

Pecan gall curculio

Scientific classification
- Kingdom: Animalia
- Phylum: Arthropoda
- Clade: Pancrustacea
- Class: Insecta
- Order: Coleoptera
- Suborder: Polyphaga
- Infraorder: Cucujiformia
- Superfamily: Curculionoidea
- Family: Curculionidae
- Genus: Conotrachelus
- Species: C. elegans

Binomial name
- Conotrachelus elegans (Say, 1831) Schoenherr, 1837

Species of beetle

Conotrachelus elegans, the pecan gall curculio, is a true weevil species in the genus Conotrachelus. It is found in North America where it feeds on galls of the hickory leaf stem gall phylloxera (Phylloxera caryaecaulis), found also on pecan.
