= Conotrachelus naso =

Scientific classification
- Kingdom: Animalia
- Phylum: Arthropoda
- Clade: Pancrustacea
- Class: Insecta
- Order: Coleoptera
- Suborder: Polyphaga
- Infraorder: Cucujiformia
- Superfamily: Curculionoidea
- Family: Curculionidae
- Genus: Conotrachelus
- Species: C. naso

Binomial name
- Conotrachelus naso LeConte, 1876

Synonyms
- Conotrachelus cinereus Van Dyke, 1930

Species of beetle

Conotrachelus naso is a species of beetle in the family Curculionidae. It is found in North America.
