= Myiophasiini =

Scientific classification
- Kingdom: Animalia
- Phylum: Arthropoda
- Class: Insecta
- Order: Diptera
- Family: Tachinidae
- Subfamily: Tachininae
- Tribe: Myiophasiini

Tribe of flies

Myiophasiini is a tribe of bristle flies in the family Tachinidae.

== Genera ==
- Cesapanama Koçak & Kemal, 2010
- Cholomyia Bigot, 1884
- Euloewiopsis Townsend, 1917
- Gnadochaeta Macquart, 1851
- Metamyiophasia Blanchard, 1966
- Myiophasiomima Blanchard, 1966
- Plesiodexilla Blanchard, 1966
- Protonotodytes Blanchard, 1966
- Schwarzalia Curran, 1934
