= Girardi =

Girardi may refer to:

== Animals ==
- Agyneta girardi, a species of sheet weaver found in Canada and the United States
- Cerodrillia girardi, a species of sea snail, a marine gastropod mollusk in the family Drilliidae
- Masticophis taeniatus girardi, a subspecies of the striped whipsnake
- Philothamnus girardi, a species of snake in the family Colubridae
- Plasmodium girardi, a malaria parasite affecting lemurs
- Suchosaurus girardi, a species of spinosaurid dinosaur in the Suchosaurus genus

=== Fish ===
- Arkansas River shiner (Notropis girardi), a species of ray-finned fish in the genus Notropis
- Labeobarbus girardi, a species of ray-finned fish in the genus Labeobarbus
- Potomac sculpin (Cottus girardi), a freshwater species of sculpin

=== Insects ===
- Ancylonotopsis girardi, a species of beetle in the family Cerambycidae
- Buckleria girardi, a moth of the family Pterophoridae
- Chrysomantis girardi, a species of praying mantis found in Côte d'Ivoire and Guinea
- Clivina girardi, a species of ground beetle in the subfamily Scaritinae
- Dyschirius girardi, a species of ground beetle in the subfamily Scaritinae
- Eunidia parastrigata girardi, a subspecies of the Eunidia parastrigata species of beetle in the family Cerambycidae
- Frea girardi, a species of beetle in the family Cerambycidae
- Inermoleiopus girardi, a species of beetle in the family Cerambycidae
- Polyptychus girardi, a moth of the family Sphingidae

== People ==
- Agenor Girardi (1952–2018), Roman Catholic bishop
- Alexander Girardi (1850–1918), Austrian actor and tenor singer in operettas
- Daniel Girardi (born 1984), Canadian former professional ice hockey defenceman
- David Girardi (born 1988), American football coach
- Guido Girardi (born 1961), Chilean doctor and politician
- Vienna Girardi (born 1986 or 1987), winner of the 14th season of The Bachelor reality television series
- Wolfgang Girardi (1928–2018), Austrian gymnast
- Vesna Girardi-Jurkić (1944–2012), Croatian archeologist and museologist

=== Americans ===
- Frank Girardi (born 1939), former American football player and coach
- Joe Girardi (born 1964), American professional baseball former catcher and current manager
- Joe Girardi (American football) (1943–1982), American football coach
- Robert Girardi (born 1961), American author
- Thomas Girardi (born 1939), attorney and a founder with Robert Keese of Girardi & Keese
- Erika Jayne (named Erika Nay Girardi; born 1971), American singer, actress and television personality

=== Italians ===
- Domenico Girardi (born 1985), Italian professional football player
- Edoardo Girardi (born 1985), Italian former road cyclist
- Francesco Girardi (born 1966), Italian equestrian
- Graziano Girardi (born 1940), Italian Venetist politician
- Sergio Girardi (born 1946), Italian professional football player
- Ulrico Girardi (1930–1986), Italian bobsledder
- Walter Girardi (born 1976), former Italian Alpine skier

== Other ==
- Girardi & Keese, a Los Angeles-based law firm
- Girardi, the surname of multiple characters from the American fantasy family drama television series Joan of Arcadia

== See also ==
- Giraldi
- Girard (disambiguation)
