= Giardi =

Giardi is a surname. Notable people with the surname include:

- Gianfranco Giardi (born 1949), Sammarinese sports shooter
- Mattia Giardi (born 1991), Sammarinese footballer
- Osvalda Giardi (1932–2019), Italian high jumper and pentathlete
- Phil and Kendra Giardi, characters in Glee

== See also ==
- Girardi (disambiguation)
