= Roger Farmer (American football) =

American football player (born 1955)

No. 80
- Position: Wide receiver

Personal information
- Born: November 10, 1955 (age 70); British Barbados
- Listed height: 6 ft 3 in (1.91 m)
- Listed weight: 195 lb (88 kg)

Career information
- High school: Thomas Jefferson (Brooklyn, New York, U.S.)
- College: Eastern Arizona (1974–1975); Baker (1976–1977)
- NFL draft: 1978: undrafted

Career history
- Baltimore Colts (1978)*; New York Jets (1979)
- * Offseason or practice squad member only

Awards and highlights
- First-team NAIA All-American (1977); All-HAAC (1977)

Career NFL statistics
- Games played: 4
- Stats at Pro Football Reference

Roger Anderson Farmer (born November 10, 1955) is a Barbadian-born former professional American football player who was a wide receiver for the New York Jets of the National Football League (NFL). Farmer played college football at Baker University in the National Association of Intercollegiate Athletics (NAIA) and was their first All-American. He later had an offseason stint with the Baltimore Colts and appeared in four games with the Jets during the 1979 season.

== Early life ==
Farmer was born on November 10, 1955, in Barbados. He is one of nine children. He later moved to the U.S. and attended Thomas Jefferson High School in Brooklyn, New York, where he played football as a tight end.

== College career ==
Farmer walked-on to play junior college football at Eastern Arizona College in 1974, at the suggestion of two of his friends. At Eastern Arizona, he switched from playing tight end to wide receiver. He became a starter and played two years at Eastern Arizona, but was a member of teams that were described by The Salina Journal as having "terrible records ... He played, but that was about all."

After Farmer graduated from Eastern Arizona, he transferred to play for the Baker Wildcats, a National Association of Intercollegiate Athletics (NAIA) team representing Baker University in Kansas. He was one of several players from Arizona recruited by new Baker coach Joe Girardi; Girardi was the only coach to give Farmer an offer. He started for the Wildcats as a junior, being named the United Press International (UPI) Midlands College Offensive Player of the Week following a five-catch, 104-yard performance with a touchdown against Kansas Wesleyan. However, overall he received few targets during the 1976 season, as Baker had a poor record, mostly ran the ball, and had four different quarterbacks used throughout the year.

The Wichita Eagle noted that coach Girardi "felt Farmer could be a great receiver – if he ever had anybody who could get the ball to him." Girardi "promised Roger he'd get a quarterback" and landed transfer Mike Baggs. The Baggs-Farmer duo became one of the top in the NAIA in the 1977 season, with Farmer finishing the season having totaled 58 receptions for 1,014 yards and 15 touchdowns in 10 games. Farmer helped Baker have its then-best season ever, with a record of 8–2, being ranked 13th nationally and placing second in the nation in scoring. Farmer's 58 receptions were first in the nation and earned him first-team All-America honors, with him being Baker's first-ever All-American. He was also chosen All-Heart of America Conference (HAAC) and to the All-NAIA District 10 team.

== Professional career ==
After not being selected in the 1978 NFL draft, Farmer signed with the Baltimore Colts as an undrafted free agent on a two-year contract. He was injured in training camp and later released on August 15, 1978. On June 13, 1979, he signed with the New York Jets. He caught two passes for 29 yards during preseason, but was released by the Jets on August 21, as they already were "overloaded with talented wide receivers", according to coach Walt Michaels.

Following injuries to Wesley Walker and Bob Raba, Farmer was re-signed by the Jets on October 31, 1979. He made his NFL debut on November 18 in a Week 12 loss to the Chicago Bears, recording no statistics. By playing in the NFL, he became the first Barbadian ever to make it to the league (and one of only five all-time), the second Baker Wildcat (and one of three all-time), and the second Thomas Jefferson High School alumnus (and one of three all-time). He made further appearances in Week 14 against the Baltimore Colts, Week 15 against the New England Patriots, and Week 16 against the Miami Dolphins, recording no statistics except being called for a holding penalty in the last game. In his four games with the Jets, he was mainly used on special teams. He was released on August 18, 1980, ending his professional career.
