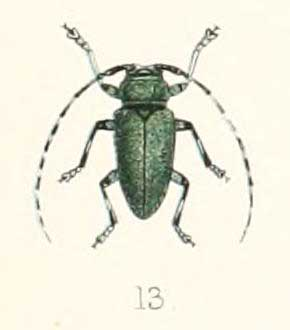
- Frea mniszechi

Scientific classification
- Kingdom: Animalia
- Phylum: Arthropoda
- Class: Insecta
- Order: Coleoptera
- Suborder: Polyphaga
- Infraorder: Cucujiformia
- Family: Cerambycidae
- Tribe: Crossotini
- Genus: Frea

= Frea (beetle) =

Genus of beetles

Frea is a genus of longhorn beetles of the subfamily Lamiinae.

subgenus Crossotofrea

- Frea aedificatoria (Hintz, 1910)
- Frea albescens Breuning, 1961
- Frea albicans Breuning, 1962
- Frea albomarmoratoides Breuning, 1979
- Frea albovittata Breuning, 1935
- Frea annulata Chevrolat, 1858
- Frea annulicornis Breuning, 1942
- Frea assimilis Breuning, 1935
- Frea barbertoni (Distant, 1898)
- Frea bimaculata Breuning, 1942
- Frea bituberculata Breuning, 1964
- Frea bituberculipennis Breuning, 1969
- Frea capensis Breuning, 1938
- Frea comorensis Breuning, 1948
- Frea conradti Breuning, 1964
- Frea flava Breuning, 1935
- Frea flavolineata Breuning, 1942
- Frea flavomarmorata Breuning, 1935
- Frea flavovittata Breuning, 1935
- Frea fusca Breuning, 1961
- Frea girardi Breuning, 1978
- Frea gnathoenioides Breuning, 1953
- Frea griseomaculata Breuning, 1935
- Frea interruptelineata Breuning, 1948
- Frea ivorensis Breuning, 1967
- Frea lata Breuning, 1935
- Frea latevittata Breuning, 1970
- Frea lineata (Hintz, 1913)
- Frea lundbladi Breuning, 1935
- Frea mabokensis Breuning, 1970
- Frea maculata Hintz, 1912
- Frea paralbicans Breuning, 1979
- Frea plurifasciculata Breuning, 1970
- Frea rosacea Breuning, 1935
- Frea rufina Breuning, 1977
- Frea schoutedeni Breuning, 1935
- Frea similis Breuning, 1977
- Frea tanganycae Breuning, 1955
- Frea thompsoni Breuning, 1956
- Frea tuberculata Aurivillius, 1910
- Frea unifasciata (Thomson, 1858)
- Frea unifuscovittata Breuning, 1967
- Frea unipunctata Breuning, 1942
- Frea virgata (Quedenfeldt, 1882)
- Frea ziczac Breuning, 1938

subgenus Cyrtofrea

- Frea albolineata (Aurivillius, 1910)
- Frea subcostata Kolbe, 1891
- Frea sublineatoides Breuning, 1962

subgenus Frea

- Frea basalis Jordan, 1894
- Frea brevicornis (Gahan, 1898)
- Frea castaneomaculata Aurivillius, 1908
- Frea circumscripta Hintz, 1910
- Frea curta (Chevrolat, 1858)
- Frea flavicollis (Aurivillius, 1914)
- Frea flavomaculata Breuning, 1956
- Frea flavoscapulata Fairmaire, 1897
- Frea flavosparsa Aurivillius, 1914
- Frea floccifera Quedenfeldt, 1885
- Frea fulvovestita (Fairmaire, 1893)
- Frea grisescens Aurivillius, 1921
- Frea haroldi (Quedenfeldt, 1883)
- Frea holobrunnea Breuning, 1970
- Frea humeraloides Breuning, 1969
- Frea jaguarita (Chevrolat, 1855)
- Frea jaguaritoides Breuning, 1977
- Frea johannae (Gahan, 1890)
- Frea laevepunctata Thomson, 1858
- Frea maculicornis Thomson, 1858
- Frea marmorata Gerstaecker, 1871
- Frea mniszechi (Thomson, 1858)
- Frea moheliana Breuning, 1957
- Frea nyassana Aurivillius, 1914
- Frea proxima Breuning, 1938
- Frea senilis (White, 1858)
- Frea sparsa (Klug, 1833)
- Frea sparsilis Jordan, 1894
- Frea taverniersi Breuning, 1973
- Frea unicolor Breuning, 1938
- Frea vadoni Breuning, 1980
- Frea vagepicta (Fairmaire, 1871)
- Frea vermiculata Kolbe, 1894
- Frea viossati Adlbauer, 1994
- Frea zambesiana Hintz, 1912
