= Inermoleiopus =

Scientific classification
- Kingdom: Animalia
- Phylum: Arthropoda
- Class: Insecta
- Order: Coleoptera
- Suborder: Polyphaga
- Infraorder: Cucujiformia
- Family: Cerambycidae
- Tribe: Acanthocinini
- Genus: Inermoleiopus

Genus of beetles

Inermoleiopus is a genus of beetles in the family Cerambycidae, containing the following species:

- Inermoleiopus delkeskampi Breuning, 1958
- Inermoleiopus flavosignatus Breuning, 1972
- Inermoleiopus fuscosignatus Breuning, 1977
- Inermoleiopus girardi Breuning, 1978
- Inermoleiopus roseofasciatus Breuning, 1973
