= Albert Girard (zoologist) =

American-born Portuguese naturalist

Albert Girard ComSE
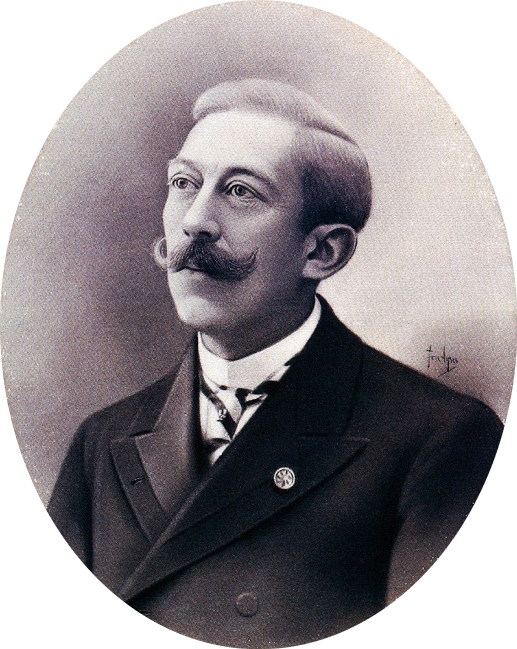
- Born: 16 October 1860; New York City, United States
- Died: 2 September 1914 (aged 53); Lisbon, Portugal
- Other name: Alberto Girard
- Citizenship: Portuguese (naturalised, 1890)
- Occupation: Marine zoologist

Albert Arthur Alexandre Girard ComSE (lusitanised as Alberto; 16 October 1860 – 2 September 1914) was an American-born Portuguese naturalist. A scientific consultant to the oceanography enthusiast King Carlos I, Girard is noted for his important collaboration in the field of marine zoology during the King's deep-sea exploration campaigns in 1896–1907.

Born in New York in 1860 to a family of French immigrants, he moved to Lisbon at a very young age as the family returned to Europe. From 1878 to 1887, he attended the Lisbon Polytechnic School and the School of the Army, where he earned a degree in civil engineering. His interest in natural history, however, led him to dedicate his research on the subject, and soon to start working with leading Portuguese zoologist Barbosa du Bocage.

Girard was made an expert member of the Committee on Fisheries, curator of the King's oceanographic collections in Necessidades Palace, and the King's scientific consultant in his marine expeditions. Girard was responsible for compiling the information extracted from the collected biological specimens, and prepare it for publication or exhibition: he organised the oceanographic exhibitions at the Lisbon Polytechnic School in 1897, at the Vasco da Gama Aquarium in 1898, in Porto in 1902 and 1903–1904, the International Oceanographic Exhibition at the Lisbon Geographic Society in 1904, and in Milan in 1906.

Albert Girard was a member of the Royal Academy of Sciences and of the Lisbon Geographic Society.

== Legacy ==
Alberto Girard is commemorated in the scientific name of a species of African snake, Philothamnus girardi.

== Distinctions ==
=== National orders ===
- Commander of the Order of Saint James of the Sword

=== Foreign orders ===
- Officer of the Legion of Honour (France)
- Officer of the Order of the Crown of Italy (Italy)
