= Buckleria brasilia =

Scientific classification
- Kingdom: Animalia
- Phylum: Arthropoda
- Class: Insecta
- Order: Lepidoptera
- Family: Pterophoridae
- Genus: Buckleria
- Species: B. brasilia

Binomial name
- Buckleria brasilia Gielis, 2006

Species of plume moth

Buckleria brasilia is a species of moth in the genus Buckleria known from Brazil. Its host plant is Drosera graminifolia. Moths in this species take flight in May and have a wingspan of about 11-12 millimetres. The specific name refers to Brazil.
