= Frea brevicornis =

Scientific classification
- Kingdom: Animalia
- Phylum: Arthropoda
- Class: Insecta
- Order: Coleoptera
- Suborder: Polyphaga
- Infraorder: Cucujiformia
- Family: Cerambycidae
- Tribe: Crossotini
- Genus: Frea
- Species: F. brevicornis

Binomial name
- Frea brevicornis (Gahan, 1898)

Synonyms
- Eumimetes brevicornis Gahan, 1898

Species of beetle

Frea brevicornis is a species of beetle in the family Cerambycidae. It was described by Gahan in 1898.
