= Frea gnathoenioides =

Scientific classification
- Kingdom: Animalia
- Phylum: Arthropoda
- Class: Insecta
- Order: Coleoptera
- Suborder: Polyphaga
- Infraorder: Cucujiformia
- Family: Cerambycidae
- Tribe: Crossotini
- Genus: Frea
- Species: F. gnathoenioides

Binomial name
- Frea gnathoenioides Breuning, 1953

Species of beetle

Frea gnathoenioides is a species of beetle in the family Cerambycidae. It was described by Stephan von Breuning in 1953.
