= Frea laevepunctata =

Scientific classification
- Kingdom: Animalia
- Phylum: Arthropoda
- Class: Insecta
- Order: Coleoptera
- Suborder: Polyphaga
- Infraorder: Cucujiformia
- Family: Cerambycidae
- Tribe: Crossotini
- Genus: Frea
- Species: F. laevepunctata

Binomial name
- Frea laevepunctata Thomson, 1858

Species of beetle

Frea laevepunctata is a species of beetle in the family Cerambycidae. It was described by Thomson in 1858. It is known from Cameroon, Equatorial Guinea, Central Africa, the Democratic Republic of the Congo, and Gabon.
