= Frea unifasciata =

Scientific classification
- Kingdom: Animalia
- Phylum: Arthropoda
- Class: Insecta
- Order: Coleoptera
- Suborder: Polyphaga
- Infraorder: Cucujiformia
- Family: Cerambycidae
- Tribe: Crossotini
- Genus: Frea
- Species: F. unifasciata

Binomial name
- Frea unifasciata (Thomson, 1858)

Synonyms
- Crossotofrea trilineata Hintz, 1913; Crossotus unifasciatus Thomson, 1858

Species of beetle

Frea unifasciata is a species of beetle in the family Cerambycidae. It was described by Thomson in 1858. It is known from Cameroon, Gabon, the Democratic Republic of the Congo, the Central African Republic, the Ivory Coast, the Republic of the Congo, and Kenya. It feeds on Albizia adianthifolia, Celtis zenkeri, Petersianthus macrocarpus, and Antiaris africana.

== Varietas ==
- Frea unifasciata var. bifuscovittata Breuning, 1954
- Frea unifasciata var. subannulicornis Breuning, 1968
