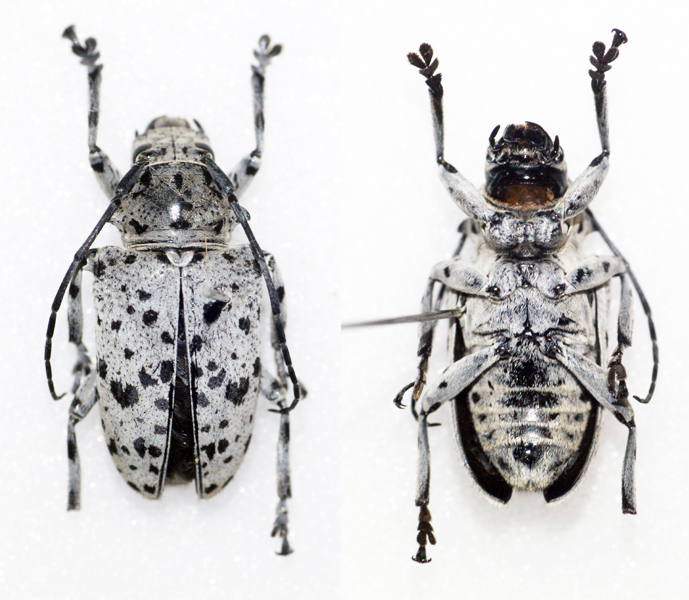

Scientific classification
- Kingdom: Animalia
- Phylum: Arthropoda
- Class: Insecta
- Order: Coleoptera
- Suborder: Polyphaga
- Infraorder: Cucujiformia
- Family: Cerambycidae
- Tribe: Crossotini
- Genus: Frea
- Species: F. maculicornis

Binomial name
- Frea maculicornis Thomson, 1858

= Frea maculicornis =

Species of beetle

Frea maculicornis is a species of beetle in the family Cerambycidae. It was described by Thomson in 1858.

== Varietas ==
- Frea maculicornis var. fuscomaculata Quedenfeldt, 1882
- Frea maculicornis var. hintzi Plavilstshikov, 1927
- Frea maculicornis var. nigrofasciata Breuning, 1942
