= Frea ziczac =

Scientific classification
- Kingdom: Animalia
- Phylum: Arthropoda
- Class: Insecta
- Order: Coleoptera
- Suborder: Polyphaga
- Infraorder: Cucujiformia
- Family: Cerambycidae
- Tribe: Crossotini
- Genus: Frea
- Species: F. ziczac

Binomial name
- Frea ziczac Breuning, 1938

Species of beetle

Frea ziczac is a species of beetle in the family Cerambycidae. It was described by Stephan von Breuning in 1938.
