= Buckleria madecassea =

Scientific classification
- Kingdom: Animalia
- Phylum: Arthropoda
- Clade: Pancrustacea
- Class: Insecta
- Order: Lepidoptera
- Family: Pterophoridae
- Genus: Buckleria
- Species: B. madecassea

Binomial name
- Buckleria madecassea Gibeaux, 1994

Species of plume moth

Buckleria madecassea is a moth of the family Pterophoridae that is known from Madagascar.
