= Frea ivorensis =

Scientific classification
- Kingdom: Animalia
- Phylum: Arthropoda
- Class: Insecta
- Order: Coleoptera
- Suborder: Polyphaga
- Infraorder: Cucujiformia
- Family: Cerambycidae
- Tribe: Crossotini
- Genus: Frea
- Species: F. ivorensis

Binomial name
- Frea ivorensis Breuning, 1967

Synonyms
- Frea (Crossotofrea) parivorensis Breuning, 1969

Species of beetle

Frea ivorensis is a species of beetle in the family Cerambycidae. It was described by Stephan von Breuning in 1967.
