= Frea bituberculata =

Scientific classification
- Kingdom: Animalia
- Phylum: Arthropoda
- Class: Insecta
- Order: Coleoptera
- Suborder: Polyphaga
- Infraorder: Cucujiformia
- Family: Cerambycidae
- Tribe: Crossotini
- Genus: Frea
- Species: F. bituberculata

Binomial name
- Frea bituberculata Breuning, 1964

Species of beetle

Frea bituberculata is a species of beetle in the family Cerambycidae. It was described by Breuning in 1964.
