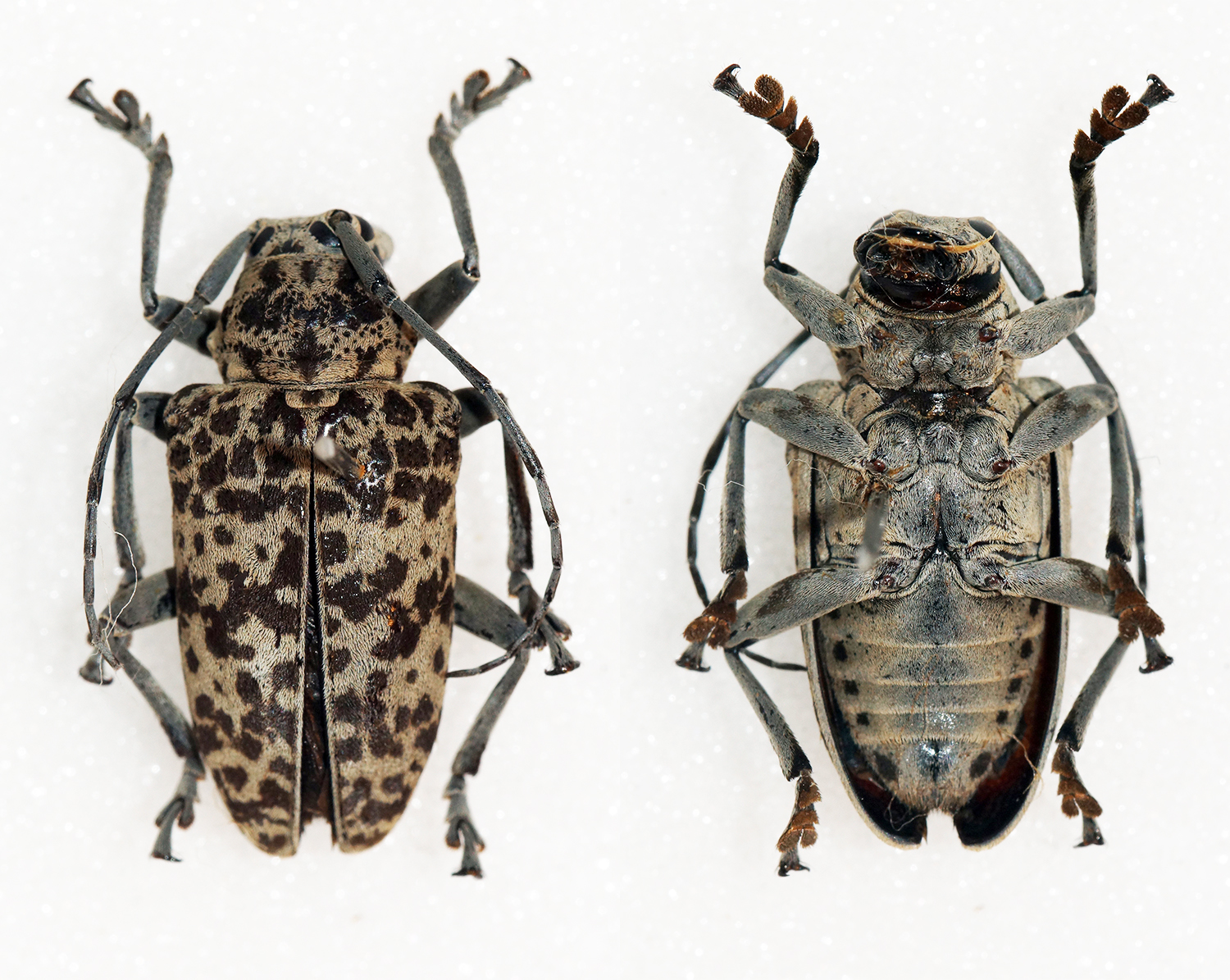

Scientific classification
- Kingdom: Animalia
- Phylum: Arthropoda
- Clade: Pancrustacea
- Class: Insecta
- Order: Coleoptera
- Suborder: Polyphaga
- Infraorder: Cucujiformia
- Family: Cerambycidae
- Tribe: Crossotini
- Genus: Frea
- Species: F. sparsa

Binomial name
- Frea sparsa (Klug, 1833)

Synonyms
- Eumimetes sparsus (Klug) Lacordaire, 1872; Phymasterna sparsa (Klug) Fairmaire, 1871; Lamia sparsa Klug, 1833

= Frea sparsa =

Species of beetle

Frea sparsa is a species of beetle in the family Cerambycidae. It was described by Johann Christoph Friedrich Klug in 1833. It is known from Madagascar. It contains the variety Frea sparsa var. vagepicta.
