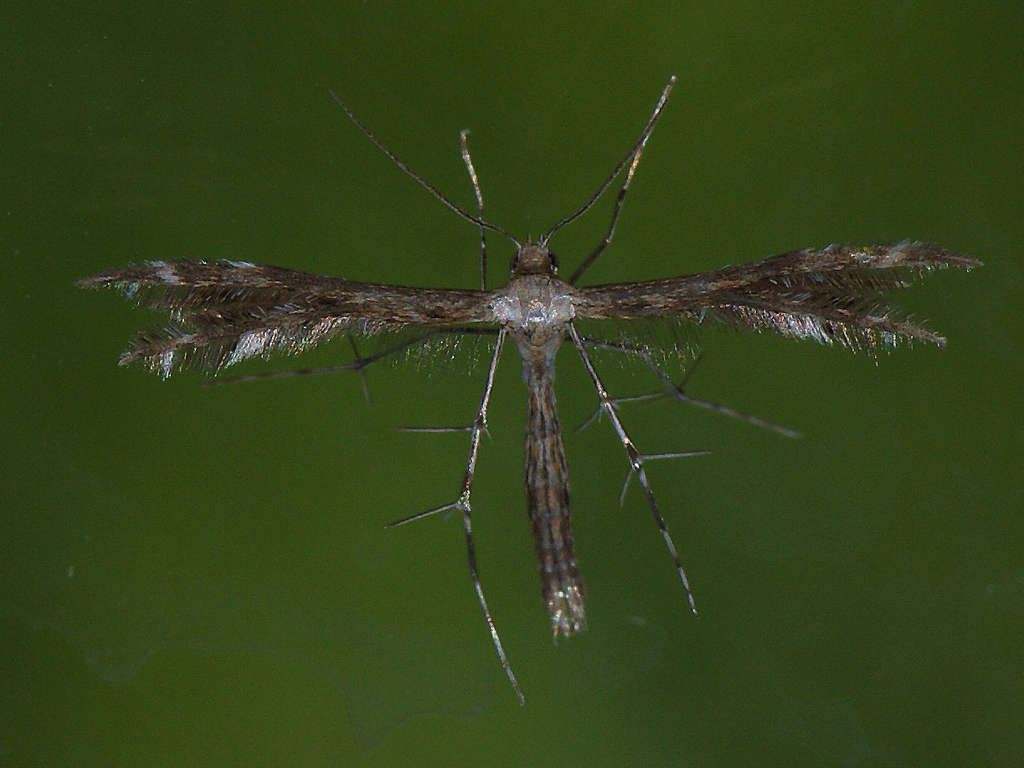

Scientific classification
- Domain: Eukaryota
- Kingdom: Animalia
- Phylum: Arthropoda
- Class: Insecta
- Order: Lepidoptera
- Family: Pterophoridae
- Genus: Buckleria
- Species: B. paludum

Binomial name
- Buckleria paludum (Zeller, 1839)

Synonyms
- Pterophorus paludum Zeller, 1841; Trichoptilus pallidum; Trichoptilus paludicola T. B. Fletcher, 1907

= Buckleria paludum =

Species of plume moth

Buckleria paludum, the European sundew moth, is a moth of the family Pterophoridae first described by Philipp Christoph Zeller in 1839. It is found in Asia and Europe.

== Description ==
The wingspan is about 12 millimetres (0.47 in). In western Europe, adults are found from June to August, flying low on the ground in the afternoon and again from dusk when it comes to light. There are two generations per year.

The larvae feed on the leaves and pods of a carnivorous plant, the round-leaved sundew (Drosera rotundifolia), leaving deposits of green frass.

== Distribution ==
It has a wide range in the Palearctic and Oriental region and is found from Europe to Japan, as well as India and Sri Lanka.
