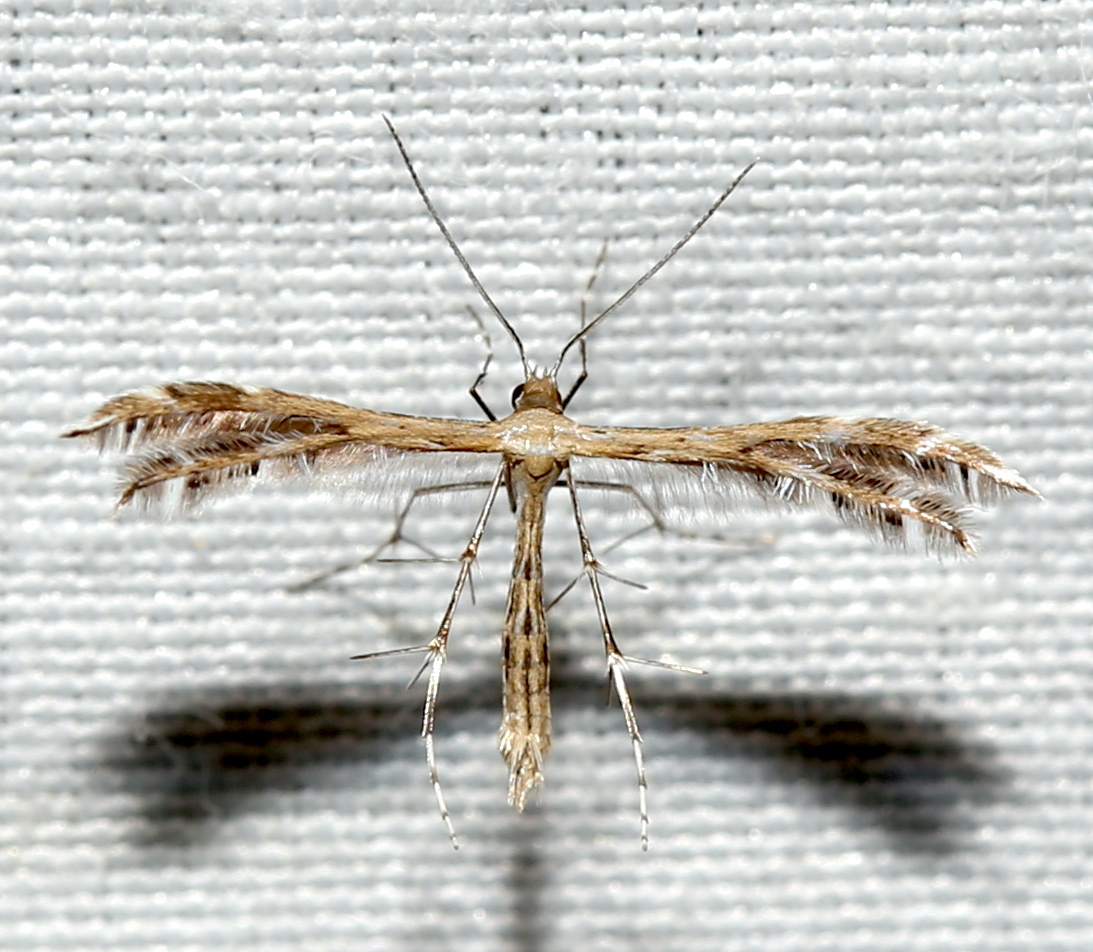

Scientific classification
- Kingdom: Animalia
- Phylum: Arthropoda
- Class: Insecta
- Order: Lepidoptera
- Family: Pterophoridae
- Genus: Buckleria
- Species: B. parvulus

Binomial name
- Buckleria parvulus (Barnes & Lindsey, 1921)

Synonyms
- Trichoptilus parvulus Barnes & Lindsey, 1921

= Buckleria parvulus =

Species of plume moth

Buckleria parvulus, the sundew plume moth, is a moth of the family Pterophoridae. The species was first described by William Barnes and Arthur Ward Lindsey in 1965 from Archbold Biological Station, Florida. It is found in the south-eastern United States, including Florida, North Carolina, Louisiana, Alabama, Georgia, Mississippi, South Carolina and Texas.

Its average wingspan is about 12 millimetres (0.47 in).

The larvae feed on Drosera brevifolia, Drosera intermedia and Drosera filiformis. They feed on the glandular trichomes, leaves and flowers of their host plant.
