= Frea virgata =

Scientific classification
- Kingdom: Animalia
- Phylum: Arthropoda
- Class: Insecta
- Order: Coleoptera
- Suborder: Polyphaga
- Infraorder: Cucujiformia
- Family: Cerambycidae
- Tribe: Crossotini
- Genus: Frea
- Species: F. virgata

Binomial name
- Frea virgata (Quedenfeldt, 1882)

Species of beetle

Frea virgata is a species of beetle in the family Cerambycidae. It was described by Quedenfeldt in 1882. It is known from Angola, the Central African Republic, Cameroon, the Ivory Coast, Gabon, Equatorial Guinea, Ghana, the Democratic Republic of the Congo, Sierra Leone, and the Republic of the Congo.
