= Ancylonotopsis fuscopictus =

Scientific classification
- Kingdom: Animalia
- Phylum: Arthropoda
- Class: Insecta
- Order: Coleoptera
- Suborder: Polyphaga
- Infraorder: Cucujiformia
- Family: Cerambycidae
- Genus: Ancylonotopsis
- Species: A. fuscopictus

Binomial name
- Ancylonotopsis fuscopictus Breuning, 1970

Species of beetle

Ancylonotopsis fuscopictus is a species of beetle in the family Cerambycidae. It was described by Breuning in 1970.
