= Frea senilis =

Scientific classification
- Kingdom: Animalia
- Phylum: Arthropoda
- Class: Insecta
- Order: Coleoptera
- Suborder: Polyphaga
- Infraorder: Cucujiformia
- Family: Cerambycidae
- Tribe: Crossotini
- Genus: Frea
- Species: F. senilis

Binomial name
- Frea senilis (White, 1858)

Synonyms
- Phymasterna senilis White, 1858

Species of beetle

Frea senilis is a species of beetle in the family Cerambycidae. It was described by White in 1858. It is known from the Democratic Republic of the Congo, and Sierra Leone.
