= Ancylonotopsis benjamini =

Scientific classification
- Kingdom: Animalia
- Phylum: Arthropoda
- Class: Insecta
- Order: Coleoptera
- Suborder: Polyphaga
- Infraorder: Cucujiformia
- Family: Cerambycidae
- Genus: Ancylonotopsis
- Species: A. benjamini

Binomial name
- Ancylonotopsis benjamini (Breuning, 1949)

Species of beetle

Ancylonotopsis benjamini is a species of beetle in the family Cerambycidae. It was described by Breuning in 1949.
