= Frea albolineata =

Scientific classification
- Kingdom: Animalia
- Phylum: Arthropoda
- Clade: Pancrustacea
- Class: Insecta
- Order: Coleoptera
- Suborder: Polyphaga
- Infraorder: Cucujiformia
- Family: Cerambycidae
- Tribe: Crossotini
- Genus: Frea
- Species: F. albolineata

Binomial name
- Frea albolineata (Aurivillius, 1910)

Synonyms
- Cyrtofrea albolineata Aurivillius, 1910

Species of beetle

Frea albolineata is a species of beetle in the family Cerambycidae. It was described by Per Olof Christopher Aurivillius in 1910.
