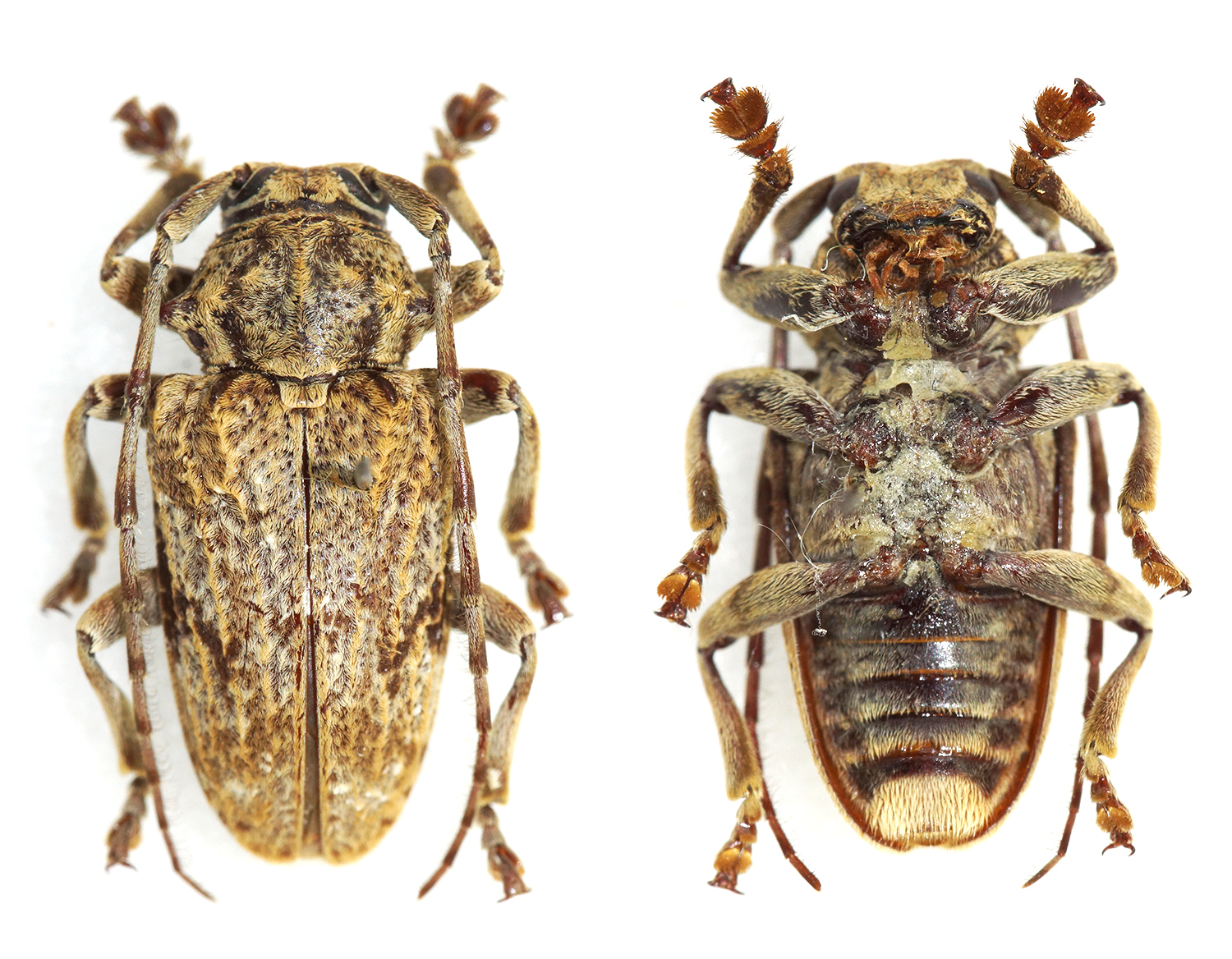

Scientific classification
- Kingdom: Animalia
- Phylum: Arthropoda
- Class: Insecta
- Order: Coleoptera
- Suborder: Polyphaga
- Infraorder: Cucujiformia
- Family: Cerambycidae
- Tribe: Crossotini
- Genus: Frea
- Species: F. aedificatoria

Binomial name
- Frea aedificatoria (Hintz, 1910)

Synonyms
- Crossotus aedificatorius Hintz, 1910; Frea sublineata Breuning, 1956

= Frea aedificatoria =

Species of beetle

Frea aedificatoria is a species of beetle in the family Cerambycidae. It had been described by Hintz in 1910.
