= Frea annulata =

Scientific classification
- Kingdom: Animalia
- Phylum: Arthropoda
- Class: Insecta
- Order: Coleoptera
- Suborder: Polyphaga
- Infraorder: Cucujiformia
- Family: Cerambycidae
- Tribe: Crossotini
- Genus: Frea
- Species: F. annulata

Binomial name
- Frea annulata Chevrolat, 1858

Synonyms
- Crossotofrea gabunica (Thomson) Aurivillius, 1913; Crossotus gabonicus Thomson, 1858

Species of beetle

Frea annulata is a species of beetle in the family Cerambycidae. It was described by Louis Alexandre Auguste Chevrolat in 1858.
