= Ancylonotopsis =

Scientific classification
- Domain: Eukaryota
- Kingdom: Animalia
- Phylum: Arthropoda
- Class: Insecta
- Order: Coleoptera
- Suborder: Polyphaga
- Infraorder: Cucujiformia
- Family: Cerambycidae
- Tribe: Ancylonotini
- Genus: Ancylonotopsis

Genus of beetles

Ancylonotopsis is a genus of longhorn beetles of the subfamily Lamiinae.

- Ancylonotopsis albomarmoratus (Breuning, 1938)
- Ancylonotopsis benjamini (Breuning, 1949)
- Ancylonotopsis duffyi Breuning, 1958
- Ancylonotopsis fuscopictus Breuning, 1970
- Ancylonotopsis fuscosignatus Breuning, 1961
- Ancylonotopsis girardi Breuning & Téocchi, 1977
- Ancylonotopsis nigrovittipennis Breuning & Téocchi, 1977
- Ancylonotopsis parvus Breuning, 1938
- Ancylonotopsis pictoides Breuning, 1974
- Ancylonotopsis pictus Breuning, 1951
- Ancylonotopsis rothkirchi (Breuning, 1956)
