= Frea viossati =

Scientific classification
- Kingdom: Animalia
- Phylum: Arthropoda
- Class: Insecta
- Order: Coleoptera
- Suborder: Polyphaga
- Infraorder: Cucujiformia
- Family: Cerambycidae
- Tribe: Crossotini
- Genus: Frea
- Species: F. viossati

Binomial name
- Frea viossati Adlbauer, 1994

Species of beetle

Frea viossati is a species of beetle in the family Cerambycidae. It was described by Adlbauer in 1994.

== Distribution ==
It is known from Comoros.

== Subspecies ==
- Frea viossati densepunctata Adlbauer, 1994
- Frea viossati viossati Adlbauer, 1994
