= Frea zambesiana =

Scientific classification
- Kingdom: Animalia
- Phylum: Arthropoda
- Class: Insecta
- Order: Coleoptera
- Suborder: Polyphaga
- Infraorder: Cucujiformia
- Family: Cerambycidae
- Tribe: Crossotini
- Genus: Frea
- Species: F. zambesiana

Binomial name
- Frea zambesiana Hintz, 1912

Species of beetle

Frea zambesiana is a species of beetle in the family Cerambycidae. It was described by E. Hintz in 1912. It is known from Malawi.
