= Frea nyassana =

Scientific classification
- Kingdom: Animalia
- Phylum: Arthropoda
- Class: Insecta
- Order: Coleoptera
- Suborder: Polyphaga
- Infraorder: Cucujiformia
- Family: Cerambycidae
- Tribe: Crossotini
- Genus: Frea
- Species: F. nyassana

Binomial name
- Frea nyassana Aurivillius, 1914

Species of beetle

Frea nyassana is a species of beetle in the family Cerambycidae. It was described by Per Olof Christopher Aurivillius in 1914 and is known from Malawi. It feeds on Pinus patula.
