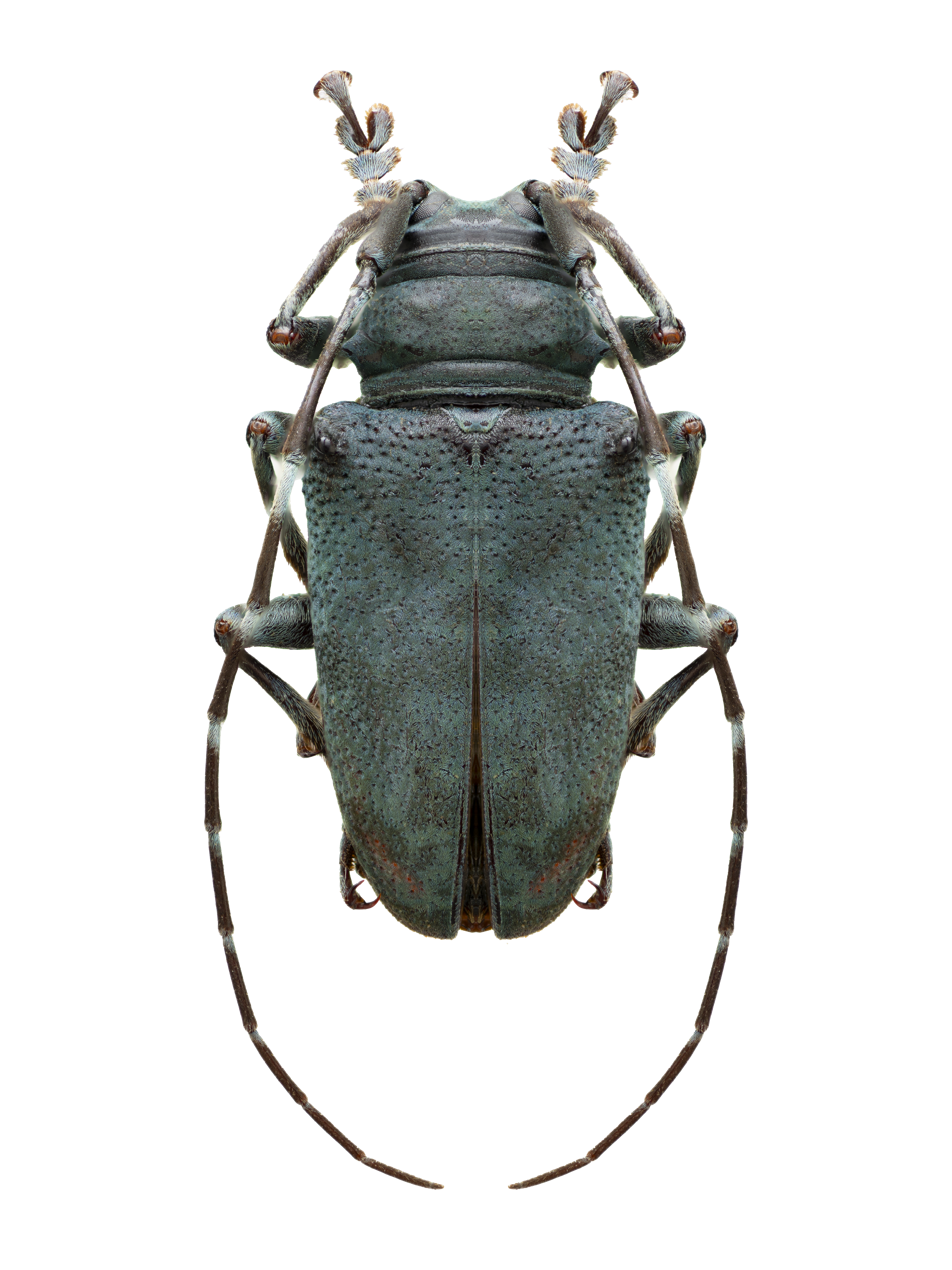

Scientific classification
- Kingdom: Animalia
- Phylum: Arthropoda
- Clade: Pancrustacea
- Class: Insecta
- Order: Coleoptera
- Suborder: Polyphaga
- Infraorder: Cucujiformia
- Family: Cerambycidae
- Tribe: Crossotini
- Genus: Frea
- Species: F. mniszechi

Binomial name
- Frea mniszechi (Thomson, 1858)

Synonyms
- Eumimetes turchais Fairmire, 1894; Frea malachitica Jordan, 1894; Sternotomis mniszechi Thomson, 1858

= Frea mniszechi =

Species of beetle

Frea mniszechi is a species of beetle in the family Cerambycidae. It was described by Thomson in 1858. It is known from Cameroon, Gabon, the Democratic Republic of the Congo, the Central African Republic, the Ivory Coast, and the Republic of the Congo.
