= Frea lata =

Scientific classification
- Kingdom: Animalia
- Phylum: Arthropoda
- Class: Insecta
- Order: Coleoptera
- Suborder: Polyphaga
- Infraorder: Cucujiformia
- Family: Cerambycidae
- Tribe: Crossotini
- Genus: Frea
- Species: F. lata

Binomial name
- Frea lata Breuning, 1935

Synonyms
- Frea (Crossotofrea) lata Breuning, 1935; Frea (Crossotofrea) schoutedeni Breuning, 1935

Species of beetle

Frea lata is a species of beetle in the family Cerambycidae. It was described by Stephan von Breuning in 1935. It is known from the Democratic Republic of the Congo.

Frea lata measure 13–14 mm (0.51–0.55 in) in length.
