= Frea flavoscapulata =

Scientific classification
- Kingdom: Animalia
- Phylum: Arthropoda
- Class: Insecta
- Order: Coleoptera
- Suborder: Polyphaga
- Infraorder: Cucujiformia
- Family: Cerambycidae
- Tribe: Crossotini
- Genus: Frea
- Species: F. flavoscapulata

Binomial name
- Frea flavoscapulata Fairmaire, 1897

Synonyms
- Frea lineata Aurivillius, 1916 nec Hintz, 1913; Frea lineatoides Teocchi, 1990

Species of beetle

Frea flavoscapulata is a species of beetle in the family Cerambycidae. It was described by Fairmaire in 1897. It contains the varietas Frea flavoscapulata var. albescens.
