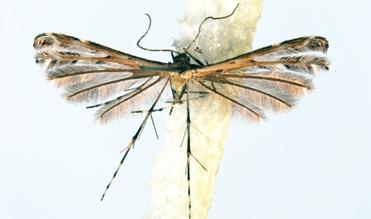

Scientific classification
- Kingdom: Animalia
- Phylum: Arthropoda
- Class: Insecta
- Order: Lepidoptera
- Family: Pterophoridae
- Genus: Buckleria
- Species: B. negotiosus

Binomial name
- Buckleria negotiosus (Meyrick, 1926)

Synonyms
- Trichoptilus negotiosus Meyrick, 1926; Buckleria vanderwolfi Gielis, 2008

= Buckleria negotiosus =

Species of plume moth

Buckleria negotiosus is a moth of the family Pterophoroidea that is found in South Africa.

The wingspan is about 13 millimetres (0.51 in). The moth flies in February. The larvae feed on Drosera.
