= Frea jaguarita =

Scientific classification
- Kingdom: Animalia
- Phylum: Arthropoda
- Class: Insecta
- Order: Coleoptera
- Suborder: Polyphaga
- Infraorder: Cucujiformia
- Family: Cerambycidae
- Tribe: Crossotini
- Genus: Frea
- Species: F. jaguarita

Binomial name
- Frea jaguarita (Chevrolat, 1855)

Synonyms
- Frea valdepunctata Thomson, 1858; Phymatosterna jaguarita (Chevrolat) Gemminger & Harold, 1873; Tragocephala jaguarita Chevrolat, 1855

Species of beetle

Frea jaguarita is a species of beetle in the family Cerambycidae. It was described by Louis Alexandre Auguste Chevrolat in 1855.
