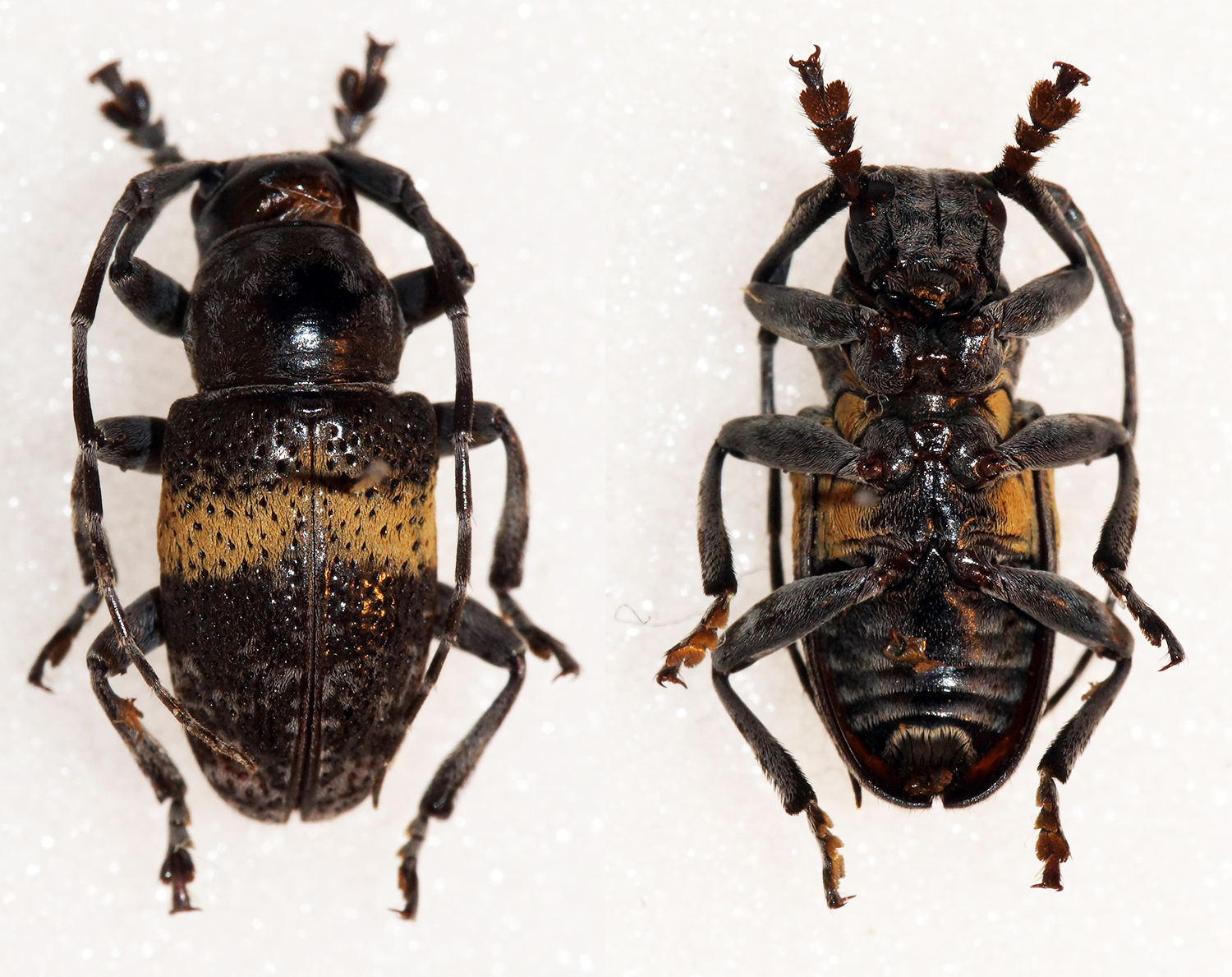

Scientific classification
- Kingdom: Animalia
- Phylum: Arthropoda
- Class: Insecta
- Order: Coleoptera
- Suborder: Polyphaga
- Infraorder: Cucujiformia
- Family: Cerambycidae
- Tribe: Crossotini
- Genus: Frea
- Species: F. haroldi

Binomial name
- Frea haroldi (Quedenfeldt, 1883)

Synonyms
- Eumimetes haroldi Quedenfeldt, 1883

= Frea haroldi =

Species of beetle

Frea haroldi is a species of beetle in the family Cerambycidae. It was described by Quedenfeldt in 1883. It is known from Cameroon, Angola, the Republic of the Congo, and the Democratic Republic of the Congo. It feeds on Coffea arabica and Coffea canephora.
