= Frea barbertoni =

Scientific classification
- Kingdom: Animalia
- Phylum: Arthropoda
- Class: Insecta
- Order: Coleoptera
- Suborder: Polyphaga
- Infraorder: Cucujiformia
- Family: Cerambycidae
- Tribe: Crossotini
- Genus: Frea
- Species: F. barbertoni

Binomial name
- Frea barbertoni (Distant, 1898)

Synonyms
- Eumimetes barbertoni Distant, 1898

Species of beetle

Frea barbertoni is a species of beetle in the family Cerambycidae. It was described by William Lucas Distant in 1898.
