= Frea flavicollis =

Scientific classification
- Kingdom: Animalia
- Phylum: Arthropoda
- Class: Insecta
- Order: Coleoptera
- Suborder: Polyphaga
- Infraorder: Cucujiformia
- Family: Cerambycidae
- Tribe: Crossotini
- Genus: Frea
- Species: F. flavicollis

Binomial name
- Frea flavicollis (Aurivillius, 1914)

Synonyms
- Frea flavosternalis Lepesme, 1950; Frea mussardi Breuning, 1969; Frea paraflavicollis Breuning, 1972; Mimofrea flavicollis Aurivillius, 1914

Species of beetle

Frea flavicollis is a species of beetle in the family Cerambycidae. It was described by Per Olof Christopher Aurivillius in 1914.
