= Ancylonotopsis fuscosignatus =

Scientific classification
- Kingdom: Animalia
- Phylum: Arthropoda
- Class: Insecta
- Order: Coleoptera
- Suborder: Polyphaga
- Infraorder: Cucujiformia
- Family: Cerambycidae
- Genus: Ancylonotopsis
- Species: A. fuscosignatus

Binomial name
- Ancylonotopsis fuscosignatus Breuning, 1961

Species of beetle

Ancylonotopsis fuscosignatus is a species of beetle in the family Cerambycidae. It was described by Breuning in 1961.
