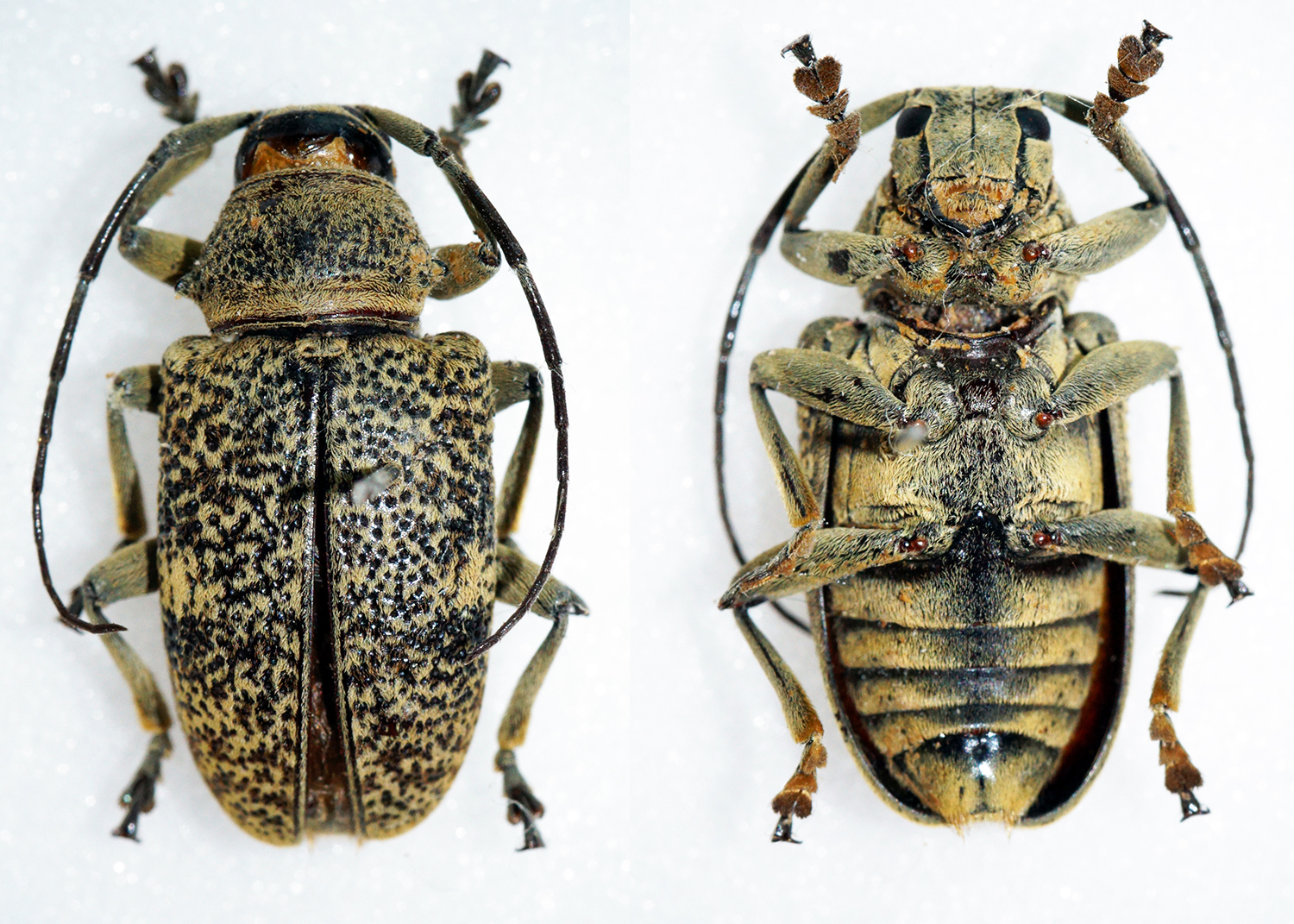

Scientific classification
- Kingdom: Animalia
- Phylum: Arthropoda
- Class: Insecta
- Order: Coleoptera
- Suborder: Polyphaga
- Infraorder: Cucujiformia
- Family: Cerambycidae
- Tribe: Crossotini
- Genus: Frea
- Species: F. johannae

Binomial name
- Frea johannae (Gahan, 1890)

Synonyms
- Eumimetes johannae Gahan, 1890

= Frea johannae =

Species of beetle

Frea johannae is a species of beetle in the family Cerambycidae. It was described by Gahan in 1890.

== Subspecies ==
- Frea johannae johannae (Gahan, 1890)
- Frea johannae moheliana Breuning, 1957
