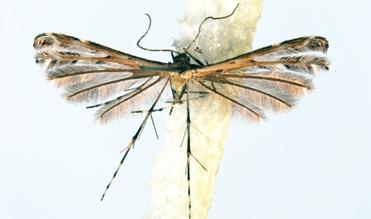
- Buckleria vanderwolfi

Scientific classification
- Kingdom: Animalia
- Phylum: Arthropoda
- Clade: Pancrustacea
- Class: Insecta
- Order: Lepidoptera
- Family: Pterophoridae
- Subfamily: Pterophorinae
- Tribe: Oxyptilini
- Genus: Buckleria; Tutt, 1905

Type species
- Pterophorus paludum Zeller, 1841

= Buckleria =

Plume moth genus

Buckleria is a genus of moths in the family Pterophoridae. Caterpillars of this genus feed on Drosera leaves.

== Species ==
- Buckleria brasilia Gielis, 2006
- Buckleria girardi Gibeaux, 1992
- Buckleria madecassea Gibeaux, 1994
- Buckleria negotiosus (Meyrick, 1926) (=Buckleria vanderwolfi Gielis, 2008)
- Buckleria paludum (Zeller, 1841)
- Buckleria parvulus (Barnes & Lindsey, 1921)
