= Inermoleiopus roseofasciatus =

Scientific classification
- Kingdom: Animalia
- Phylum: Arthropoda
- Class: Insecta
- Order: Coleoptera
- Suborder: Polyphaga
- Infraorder: Cucujiformia
- Family: Cerambycidae
- Genus: Inermoleiopus
- Species: I. roseofasciatus

Binomial name
- Inermoleiopus roseofasciatus Breuning, 1973

Species of beetle

Inermoleiopus roseofasciatus is a species of beetle in the family Cerambycidae. It was described by Breuning in 1973.
