= Frea circumscripta =

Scientific classification
- Kingdom: Animalia
- Phylum: Arthropoda
- Class: Insecta
- Order: Coleoptera
- Suborder: Polyphaga
- Infraorder: Cucujiformia
- Family: Cerambycidae
- Tribe: Crossotini
- Genus: Frea
- Species: F. circumscripta

Binomial name
- Frea circumscripta Hintz, 1910

Species of beetle

Frea circumscripta is a species of beetle in the family Cerambycidae. It was described by Hintz in 1910.
