= Frea grisescens =

Scientific classification
- Kingdom: Animalia
- Phylum: Arthropoda
- Class: Insecta
- Order: Coleoptera
- Suborder: Polyphaga
- Infraorder: Cucujiformia
- Family: Cerambycidae
- Tribe: Crossotini
- Genus: Frea
- Species: F. grisescens

Binomial name
- Frea grisescens Aurivillius, 1921

Synonyms
- Eumimetes griseus Hintz, 1911 nec Jordan, 1894

Species of beetle

Frea grisescens is a species of beetle in the family Cerambycidae. It was described by Per Olof Christopher Aurivillius in 1921.
