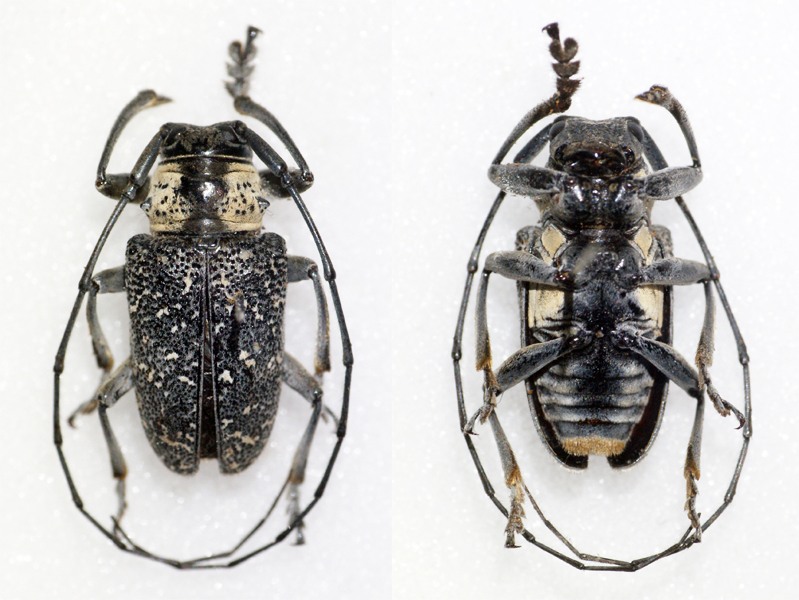

Scientific classification
- Kingdom: Animalia
- Phylum: Arthropoda
- Class: Insecta
- Order: Coleoptera
- Suborder: Polyphaga
- Infraorder: Cucujiformia
- Family: Cerambycidae
- Tribe: Crossotini
- Genus: Frea
- Species: F. basalis

Binomial name
- Frea basalis Jordan, 1894

= Frea basalis =

Species of beetle

Frea basalis is a species of beetle in the family Cerambycidae. It was described by Karl Jordan in 1894. It is known from Cameroon, Angola, and the Democratic Republic of the Congo.

== Varieties ==
- Frea basalis var. fasciolata (Hintz, 1912)
- Frea basalis var. griseobasalis Breuning, 1942
- Frea basalis var. thoracica (Hintz, 1912)
- Frea basalis var. uniformis (Hintz, 1912)
