= Ancylonotopsis duffyi =

Scientific classification
- Kingdom: Animalia
- Phylum: Arthropoda
- Class: Insecta
- Order: Coleoptera
- Suborder: Polyphaga
- Infraorder: Cucujiformia
- Family: Cerambycidae
- Genus: Ancylonotopsis
- Species: A. duffyi

Binomial name
- Ancylonotopsis duffyi Breuning, 1958

Species of beetle

Ancylonotopsis duffyi is a species of beetle in the family Cerambycidae. It was described by Breuning in 1958.
