= Giraldi =

Giraldi is a surname, and may refer to:

- Bob Giraldi (born 1939), an American film and television director
- Dez Giraldi (born 1986), an Australian soccer player
- Franco Giraldi (1931–2020), an Italian film director
- Giglio Gregorio Giraldi (1479–1552), an Italian scholar and poet
- Giovanni Battista Giraldi, an Italian novelist and poet
- Guglielmo Pecori Giraldi (1856–1941), an Italian Field Marshal
- Orazio Giraldi (died 1617), a Roman Catholic prelate
- Philip Giraldi, a former CIA agent
- Stefano Giraldi (born 1968), Italian former road cyclist
- Ubaldo Giraldi (1692–1775), an Italian canonist
- William Giraldi (born 1974), American writer, critic, and journalist

== See also ==
- Giraldii
