= Frea maculata =

Scientific classification
- Kingdom: Animalia
- Phylum: Arthropoda
- Class: Insecta
- Order: Coleoptera
- Suborder: Polyphaga
- Infraorder: Cucujiformia
- Family: Cerambycidae
- Tribe: Crossotini
- Genus: Frea
- Species: F. maculata

Binomial name
- Frea maculata Hintz, 1912

Species of beetle

Frea maculata is a species of beetle in the family Cerambycidae. It was described by Hintz in 1912.
