= Frea bimaculata =

Scientific classification
- Kingdom: Animalia
- Phylum: Arthropoda
- Class: Insecta
- Order: Coleoptera
- Suborder: Polyphaga
- Infraorder: Cucujiformia
- Family: Cerambycidae
- Tribe: Crossotini
- Genus: Frea
- Species: F. bimaculata

Binomial name
- Frea bimaculata Breuning, 1942

Species of beetle

Frea bimaculata is a species of beetle in the family Cerambycidae. It was described by Breuning in 1942.
