= Frea curta =

Scientific classification
- Kingdom: Animalia
- Phylum: Arthropoda
- Class: Insecta
- Order: Coleoptera
- Suborder: Polyphaga
- Infraorder: Cucujiformia
- Family: Cerambycidae
- Tribe: Crossotini
- Genus: Frea
- Species: F. curta

Binomial name
- Frea curta (Chevrolat, 1858)

Synonyms
- Eumimetes aureocinctus Aurivillius, 1903; Eumimetes frater Lameere, 1893; Gnathoenia curta Chevrolat, 1858; Phymatosterna curta (Chevrolat) Gemminger & Harold, 1873

Species of beetle

Frea curta is a species of beetle in the family Cerambycidae. It was described by Chevrolat in 1858. It is known from Cameroon, the Ivory Coast, Ghana, Benin, Guinea, Sierra Leone, Nigeria, and Togo.
