= Frea lineata =

Scientific classification
- Kingdom: Animalia
- Phylum: Arthropoda
- Class: Insecta
- Order: Coleoptera
- Suborder: Polyphaga
- Infraorder: Cucujiformia
- Family: Cerambycidae
- Tribe: Crossotini
- Genus: Frea
- Species: F. lineata

Binomial name
- Frea lineata (Hintz, 1913)

Synonyms
- Crossotofrea lineata Hintz, 1913

Species of beetle

Frea lineata is a species of beetle in the family Cerambycidae. It was described by Hintz in 1913.
