= Frea rosacea =

Scientific classification
- Kingdom: Animalia
- Phylum: Arthropoda
- Clade: Pancrustacea
- Class: Insecta
- Order: Coleoptera
- Suborder: Polyphaga
- Infraorder: Cucujiformia
- Family: Cerambycidae
- Tribe: Crossotini
- Genus: Frea
- Species: F. rosacea

Binomial name
- Frea rosacea Breuning, 1935

Synonyms
- Frea (Crossotofrea) rosacea Breuning, 1935

Species of beetle

Frea rosacea is a species of longhorn beetle belonging to the family Cerambycidae, within the subfamily Lamiinae (flat-faced longhorned beetles). It was scientifically described by Austrian entomologist Stephan von Breuning in 1935.

== Distribution ==
The type specimen used for the original description of Frea rosacea was collected in the Democratic Republic of the Congo.

== Taxonomy ==
The species is assigned to the subgenus Crossotofrea and categorized within the subtribe Crossotina.
