= Frea sparsilis =

Scientific classification
- Kingdom: Animalia
- Phylum: Arthropoda
- Class: Insecta
- Order: Coleoptera
- Suborder: Polyphaga
- Infraorder: Cucujiformia
- Family: Cerambycidae
- Tribe: Crossotini
- Genus: Frea
- Species: F. sparsilis

Binomial name
- Frea sparsilis Jordan, 1894

Species of beetle

Frea sparsilis is a species of beetle in the family Cerambycidae. It was described by Karl Jordan in 1894. It is known from Angola, Gabon, Cameroon, the Republic of the Congo, and the Democratic Republic of the Congo.
