= Ancylonotopsis girardi =

Scientific classification
- Kingdom: Animalia
- Phylum: Arthropoda
- Class: Insecta
- Order: Coleoptera
- Suborder: Polyphaga
- Infraorder: Cucujiformia
- Family: Cerambycidae
- Genus: Ancylonotopsis
- Species: A. girardi

Binomial name
- Ancylonotopsis girardi Breuning & Téocchi, 1977

Species of beetle

Ancylonotopsis girardi is a species of beetle in the family Cerambycidae. It was described by Stephan von Breuning and Téocchi in 1977.
