= Inermoleiopus girardi =

Scientific classification
- Kingdom: Animalia
- Phylum: Arthropoda
- Class: Insecta
- Order: Coleoptera
- Suborder: Polyphaga
- Infraorder: Cucujiformia
- Family: Cerambycidae
- Genus: Inermoleiopus
- Species: I. girardi

Binomial name
- Inermoleiopus girardi Breuning, 1978

Species of beetle

Inermoleiopus girardi is a species of beetle in the family Cerambycidae. It was described by Breuning in 1978.
