= Buckleria girardi =

Scientific classification
- Kingdom: Animalia
- Phylum: Arthropoda
- Clade: Pancrustacea
- Class: Insecta
- Order: Lepidoptera
- Family: Pterophoridae
- Genus: Buckleria
- Species: B. girardi

Binomial name
- Buckleria girardi Gibeaux, 1992

Species of plume moth

Buckleria girardi is a moth of the family Pterophoridae that is known from Guinea.
