= Mattia Giardi =

Sammarinese footballer

Personal information
- Full name: Mattia Giardi
- Date of birth: 15 December 1991 (age 34)
- Place of birth: San Marino
- Position: Midfielder

Team information
- Current team: Murata

Senior career*
Years	Team	Apps	(Gls)
2010–2019	Faetano	143	(27)
2019	Tre Fiori	10	(0)
2019–2020	Tropical Coriano		
2020–2021	Folgore	18	(0)
2021–2023	Faetano	50	(2)
2023–2024	Murata	0	(0)

International career^{‡}
2009	San Marino U19	3	(0)
2010	San Marino U21	3	(0)
2018–2021	San Marino	13	(0)
- * Club domestic league appearances and goals as of 30 May 2025 ‡ National team caps and goals as of 27 March 2021

Mattia Giardi (born 15 December 1991) is a Sammarinese footballer who last played as a midfielder for Murata and the San Marino national team.

== International career ==
Giardi made his international debut for San Marino on 8 September 2018, starting in the 2018–19 UEFA Nations League D match against Belarus, which finished as a 0–5 away loss.

== Career statistics ==
=== International ===
As of 27 March 2021

San Marino
Year	Apps	Goals
2018	5	0
2019	5	0
2020	2	0
2021	3	0
Total	13	0
