= Gianfranco Giardi =

Sammarinese sports shooter

Personal information
- Nationality: Sammarinese
- Born: 6 December 1949 (age 75)

Sport
- Sport: Sports shooting

Gianfranco Giardi (born 6 December 1949) is a Sammarinese sports shooter. He competed at the 1980 Summer Olympics and the 1984 Summer Olympics.
