= Eunidia parastrigata =

Scientific classification
- Kingdom: Animalia
- Phylum: Arthropoda
- Clade: Pancrustacea
- Class: Insecta
- Order: Coleoptera
- Suborder: Polyphaga
- Infraorder: Cucujiformia
- Family: Cerambycidae
- Genus: Eunidia
- Species: E. parastrigata

Binomial name
- Eunidia parastrigata Breuning, 1978

Species of beetle

Eunidia parastrigata is a species of beetle in the family Cerambycidae. It was described by Stephan von Breuning in 1978.

== Subspecies ==
- Eunidia parastrigata girardi Breuning, 1981
- Eunidia parastrigata parastrigata Breuning, 1978
