= Ubaldo Giraldi =

Ubaldo Giraldi (1692–1775), also known by the Latin name Ubaldus A Sancto Cajetano, was an Italian canonist.

== Life ==
Giraldi was a member of the Piarists (Clerici regulares Scholarum piarum), was twice assistant general-councillor of his congregation, was provincial superior of the Roman province, rector of the Piarist college at Rome, and Apostolic examiner for the Roman clergy.

== Works ==
He published an edition, with additions (Rome, 1757), of the Institutiones Canonicæ of Remy Maschat, also a Piarist. The Expositio juris pontificii of Giraldi (Rome, 1769; re-edited, 1829–1830) is not a treatise on canon law. The author merely reproduces the principal texts of the Decretals and of the Council of Trent, adding thereto such papal documents as interpret or modify their meaning, with a brief commentary of his own. His last work, on which his reputation is chiefly based, was a new edition with notes and additions of Barbosa's great work on parish priests, Animadversiones et additamenta ex posterioribus summorum pontificum constitutionibus et sacrarum congregationum decretis desumpta, ad Aug. Barbosa, de Officio et Potestate parochi (Rome, 1773, new ed., 1831).
