= Philothamnus girardi =

Conservation status
- Least Concern (IUCN 3.1)

Scientific classification
- Kingdom: Animalia
- Phylum: Chordata
- Class: Reptilia
- Order: Squamata
- Suborder: Serpentes
- Family: Colubridae
- Genus: Philothamnus
- Species: P. girardi

Binomial name
- Philothamnus girardi Bocage, 1893

Synonyms
- Philothamnus girardi Bocage, 1893; Philothamnus semivariegatus girardi — Mertens, 1934; Philothamnus girardi — Hughes, 1985

Species of snake

Philothamnus girardi, also known commonly as the Annobon wood snake and Girard's green snake, is a species of snake in the family Colubridae. The species is native to Central Africa.

== Taxonomy ==
P. girardi was originally described and named as a species new to science by José Vicente Barbosa du Bocage in 1893.

== Etymology ==
The specific name, girardi, is in honor of French-Portuguese zoologist Alberto Arthur Alexandre Girard (1860-1914).

== Geographic range ==
P. girardi occurs on the island of Annobón in Equatorial Guinea. The species may also occur in the Republic of the Congo.

== Habitat ==
The preferred natural habitat of P. girardi is forest.

== Behavior ==
P. girardi is fully arboreal.

== Reproduction ==
P. girardi is oviparous.
