= Joe Girardi (American football) =

American football coach

Biographical details
- Born: January 14, 1943; New Kensington, Pennsylvania
- Died: December 7, 1982 (aged 39) near Winslow, Arizona

Playing career
- c. 1965: Southwestern State (OK)

Coaching career (HC unless noted)
- 1967: Winona HS (KS)
- 1968–1971: Leoti HS (KS)
- 1972–1975: Blue Ridge HS (AZ)
- 1976–1979: Baker

Head coaching record
- Overall: 25–15–1 (college); 72–18–1 (high school)

Accomplishments and honors

Championships
- 1 HAAC (1979)

Joseph Domnick Girardi (January 14, 1943 – December 7, 1982) was an American football coach. He was the head football coach at Baker University in Baldwin City, Kansas for four seasons, from 1976 until 1979. His coaching record at Baker was 25–15–1.

Girardi died in a one-car accident on Interstate 40 near Winslow, Arizona in 1982.

== Head coaching record ==
=== College ===
Year	Team	Overall	Conference	Standing	Bowl/playoffs
Baker Wildcats (Heart of America Athletic Conference) (1976–1979)
1976	Baker	2–7–1	0–5–1	7th	
1977	Baker	8–2	4–2	T–2nd	
1978	Baker	8–2	4–2	T–2nd	
1979	Baker	7–3	5–1	T–1st	
Baker:		25–15–1	13–10–1		
Total:		25–15–1			
National championship Conference title Conference division title or championship game berth
