= Dichostates nigroguttatus =

Scientific classification
- Domain: Eukaryota
- Kingdom: Animalia
- Phylum: Arthropoda
- Class: Insecta
- Order: Coleoptera
- Suborder: Polyphaga
- Infraorder: Cucujiformia
- Family: Cerambycidae
- Tribe: Crossotini
- Genus: Dichostates
- Species: D. nigroguttatus

Binomial name
- Dichostates nigroguttatus Jordan, 1894

Species of beetle

Dichostates nigroguttatus is a species of beetle in the family Cerambycidae. It was described by Karl Jordan in 1894.
