= Apenes parallela =

Scientific classification
- Kingdom: Animalia
- Phylum: Arthropoda
- Class: Insecta
- Order: Coleoptera
- Suborder: Adephaga
- Family: Carabidae
- Genus: Apenes
- Species: A. parallela

Binomial name
- Apenes parallela (Dejean, 1825)

Species of beetle

Apenes parallela is a species of ground beetle in the family Carabidae.

== Subspecies ==
These three subspecies belong to the species Apenes parallela:

- Apenes parallela inaguae Darlington, 1953
- Apenes parallela parallela (Dejean, 1825)
- Apenes parallela sublaevis Darlington, 1934
