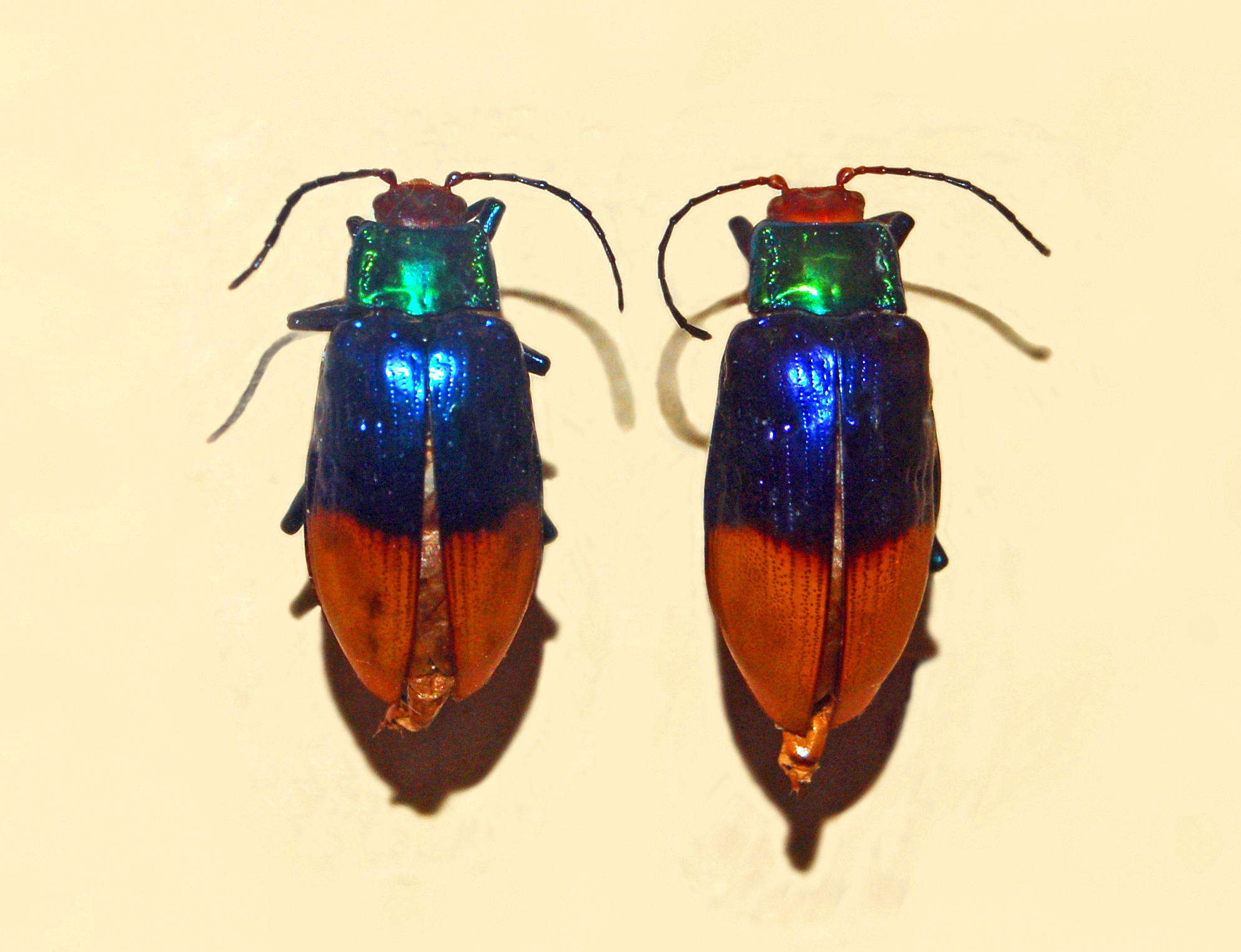
- Promechus splendens from Papua New Guinea

Scientific classification
- Domain: Eukaryota
- Kingdom: Animalia
- Phylum: Arthropoda
- Class: Insecta
- Order: Coleoptera
- Suborder: Polyphaga
- Infraorder: Cucujiformia
- Family: Chrysomelidae
- Subfamily: Chrysomelinae
- Genus: Promechus
- Species: P. splendens

Binomial name
- Promechus splendens (Guérin-Méneville, 1833)

Synonyms
- Phyllocharis splendens Guérin-Méneville, 1833; Phyllocharis tricolor Chevrolat, 1830; Promechus splendidus Boisduval, 1835

= Promechus splendens =

Species of leaf beetle

Promechus splendens is a species of beetle belonging to the Chrysomelidae family.

== Description ==
This species reaches about 20–25 millimetres (0.79–0.98 in) in length. Pronotum is metallic green, while elytra are blue and yellow-orange.

== Distribution ==
Promechus splendens occurs in Papua New Guinea.
