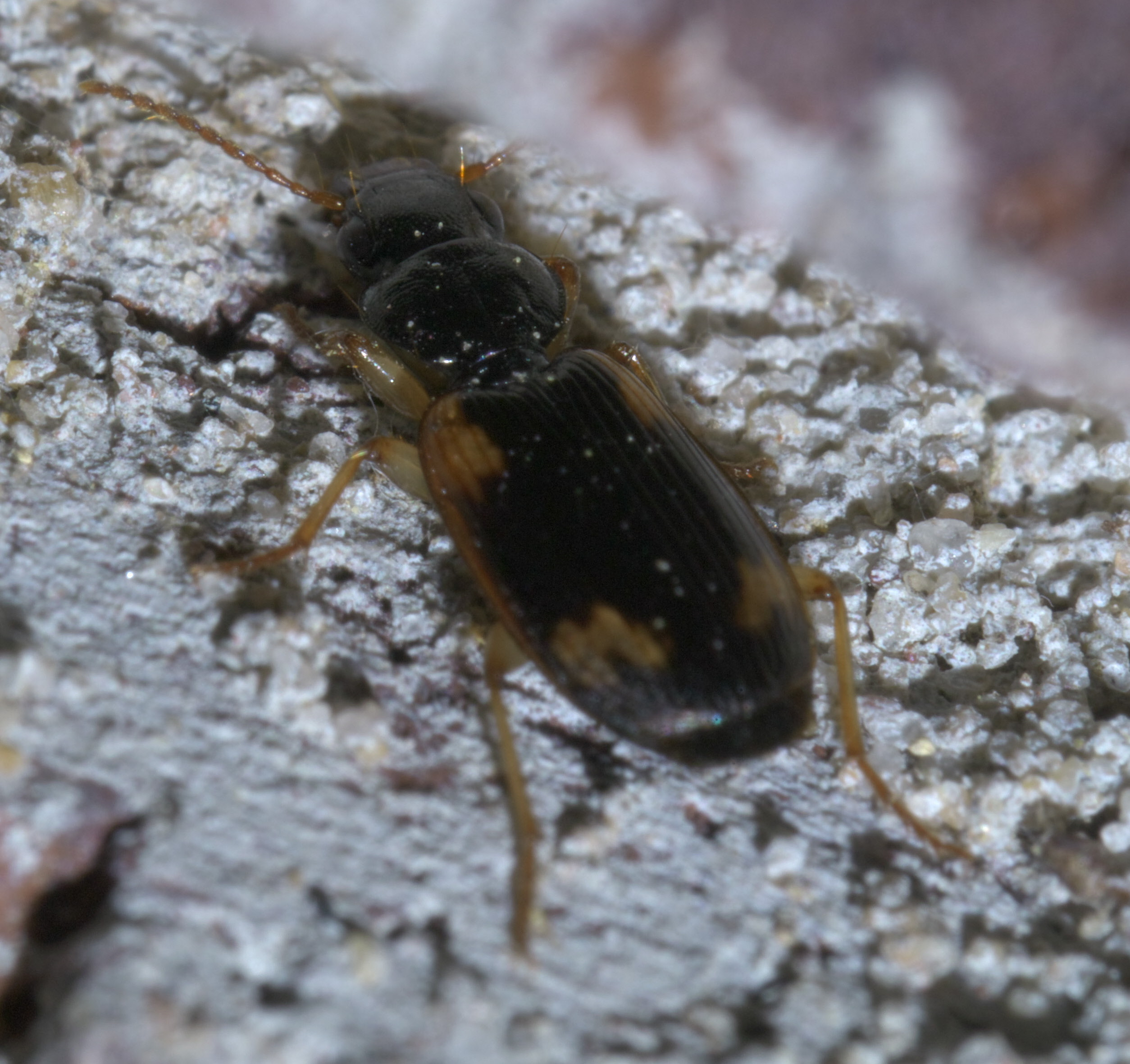
- Apenes sinuata from Oklahoma
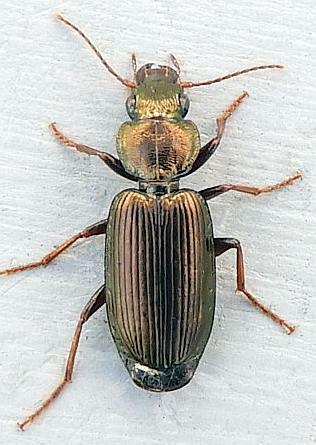
- Apenes lucidula from the United States

Scientific classification
- Kingdom: Animalia
- Phylum: Arthropoda
- Class: Insecta
- Order: Coleoptera
- Suborder: Adephaga
- Family: Carabidae
- Tribe: Lebiini
- Genus: Apenes; LeConte, 1851

= Apenes =

Genus of beetles

Apenes is a genus of ground beetles in the family Carabidae. They have a distribution across the New world however they mostly live in the southern and neotropical regions with only two northern species.

There are at least 80 described species in Apenes.

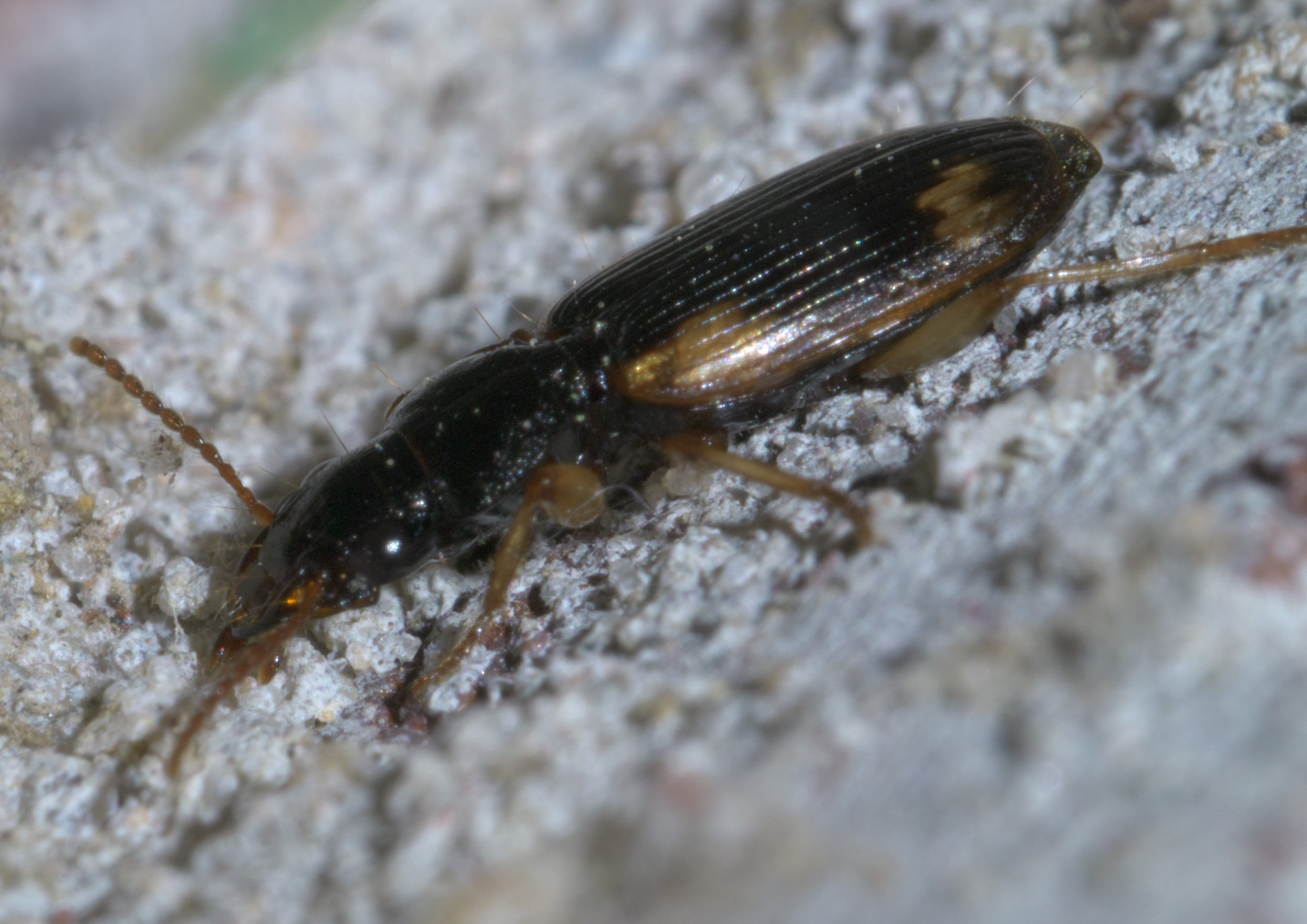
Apenes sinuata

== Species ==
These 86 species that belong to the genus Apenes:

- Apenes aenea (Dejean, 1831)
- Apenes aeneipennis (Chaudoir, 1852)
- Apenes aerea Steinheil, 1875
- Apenes amplicollis Bates, 1891
- Apenes angustata Schwarz, 1878
- Apenes apiceguttata Chaudoir, 1875
- Apenes aptera Darlington, 1936
- Apenes bonariensis Liebke, 1939
- Apenes brevivittis Chaudoir, 1875
- Apenes calligramma Bates, 1884
- Apenes cayennensis (Buquet, 1835)
- Apenes chalumeaui Ball & Shpeley, 1992
- Apenes circumcincta Chaudoir, 1875
- Apenes comis Bates, 1878
- Apenes coriacea (Chevrolat, 1863)
- Apenes cuprascens Chaudoir, 1875
- Apenes darlingtoni Ball & Shpeley, 1992
- Apenes davidsoni Ball & Shpeley, 2009
- Apenes delicata Darlington, 1934
- Apenes dilutiventris Chaudoir, 1875
- Apenes dominica Ball & Shpeley, 1992
- Apenes ehrhardti (Liebke, 1939)
- Apenes erythrodera Chaudoir, 1875
- Apenes faber Ball & Shpeley, 2009
- Apenes farri Ball & Shpeley, 1992
- Apenes fasciata Chaudoir, 1875
- Apenes hamigera (Chaudoir, 1875)
- Apenes hilariola Bates, 1891
- Apenes iviei Ball & Shpeley, 1992
- Apenes kathleenae Ball & Shpeley, 1992
- Apenes lachauxi Ball & Shpeley, 2009
- Apenes laevicincta Darlington, 1934
- Apenes laevis Liebke, 1939
- Apenes lata Darlington, 1934
- Apenes lepidula Darlington, 1934
- Apenes limbata G. Horn, 1895
- Apenes lucia Ball & Shpeley, 2009
- Apenes lucidula (Dejean, 1831)
- Apenes lunigera Chaudoir, 1875
- Apenes lunulata Chaudoir, 1875
- Apenes maculata (Gory, 1833)
- Apenes marginalis (Dejean, 1831)
- Apenes mazoreoides Chaudoir, 1875
- Apenes morio (Dejean, 1825)
- Apenes nebulosa LeConte, 1867
- Apenes nevermanni Liebke, 1939
- Apenes obscura Chaudoir, 1875
- Apenes octoguttulata Motschulsky, 1864
- Apenes omostigma (Motschulsky, 1864)
- Apenes opaca LeConte, 1851
- Apenes ovalis Darlington, 1936
- Apenes ovipennis Liebke, 1936
- Apenes pallidipes (Chevrolat, 1836)
- Apenes pallipes (Fabricius, 1792)
- Apenes parallela (Dejean, 1825)
- Apenes parvula (Chaudoir, 1875)
- Apenes pauliana Liebke, 1939
- Apenes pecki Ball & Shpeley, 2009
- Apenes peryphoides Bates, 1883
- Apenes philipi Ball & Shpeley, 2009
- Apenes plaumanni (Liebke, 1939)
- Apenes portoricensis Darlington, 1939
- Apenes postica (Dejean, 1831)
- Apenes prasina Ball & Shpeley, 1992
- Apenes purpurata Fleutiaux & Sallé, 1890
- Apenes purpuripennis Chaudoir, 1875
- Apenes quadripennis (Chaudoir, 1875)
- Apenes quadripunctata (Reiche, 1842)
- Apenes rawlinsi Ball & Shpeley, 2009
- Apenes sallei (Chaudoir, 1875)
- Apenes scobifer Darlington, 1934
- Apenes sculpticeps Ball & Shpeley, 2009
- Apenes seriata (Motschulsky, 1864)
- Apenes simoni Liebke, 1935
- Apenes sinuata (Say, 1823)
- Apenes steinheili Ball & Shpeley, 1992
- Apenes stigmata Liebke, 1939
- Apenes strandi Liebke, 1939
- Apenes sulcicollis (Jacquelin du Val, 1857)
- Apenes thomasi Ball & Shpeley, 2009
- Apenes toussainti Ball & Shpeley, 2009
- Apenes umbrosa Csiki, 1932
- Apenes variegata (Dejean, 1825)
- Apenes vianai Liebke, 1939
- Apenes xanthopleura Chaudoir, 1875
- Apenes youngi Ball & Shpeley, 2009
