= Dichostates flavoguttatus =

Scientific classification
- Domain: Eukaryota
- Kingdom: Animalia
- Phylum: Arthropoda
- Class: Insecta
- Order: Coleoptera
- Suborder: Polyphaga
- Infraorder: Cucujiformia
- Family: Cerambycidae
- Tribe: Crossotini
- Genus: Dichostates
- Species: D. flavoguttatus

Binomial name
- Dichostates flavoguttatus Hintz, 1912

Species of beetle

Dichostates flavoguttatus is a species of beetle in the family Cerambycidae. It was described by Hintz in 1912.
