= Dichostates pygmaeus =

Scientific classification
- Domain: Eukaryota
- Kingdom: Animalia
- Phylum: Arthropoda
- Class: Insecta
- Order: Coleoptera
- Suborder: Polyphaga
- Infraorder: Cucujiformia
- Family: Cerambycidae
- Tribe: Crossotini
- Genus: Dichostates
- Species: D. pygmaeus

Binomial name
- Dichostates pygmaeus Téocchi, 2001

Species of beetle

Dichostates pygmaeus is a species of beetle in the family Cerambycidae. It was described by Téocchi in 2001.
