= Dichostates quadrisignatus =

Scientific classification
- Kingdom: Animalia
- Phylum: Arthropoda
- Class: Insecta
- Order: Coleoptera
- Suborder: Polyphaga
- Infraorder: Cucujiformia
- Family: Cerambycidae
- Tribe: Crossotini
- Genus: Dichostates
- Species: D. quadrisignatus

Binomial name
- Dichostates quadrisignatus Hintz, 1912

Species of beetle

Dichostates quadrisignatus is a species of beetle in the family Cerambycidae. It was described by Hintz in 1912. It is known from the Democratic Republic of the Congo.
