= Dichostates rubromaculatus =

Scientific classification
- Kingdom: Animalia
- Phylum: Arthropoda
- Class: Insecta
- Order: Coleoptera
- Suborder: Polyphaga
- Infraorder: Cucujiformia
- Family: Cerambycidae
- Tribe: Crossotini
- Genus: Dichostates
- Species: D. rubromaculatus

Binomial name
- Dichostates rubromaculatus Breuning, 1938

Synonyms
- Dichostathes rubromaculatus Breuning, 1938

Species of beetle

Dichostates rubromaculatus is a species of beetle in the family Cerambycidae. It was described by Stephan von Breuning in 1938. It is known from the Ivory Coast and Nigeria.
