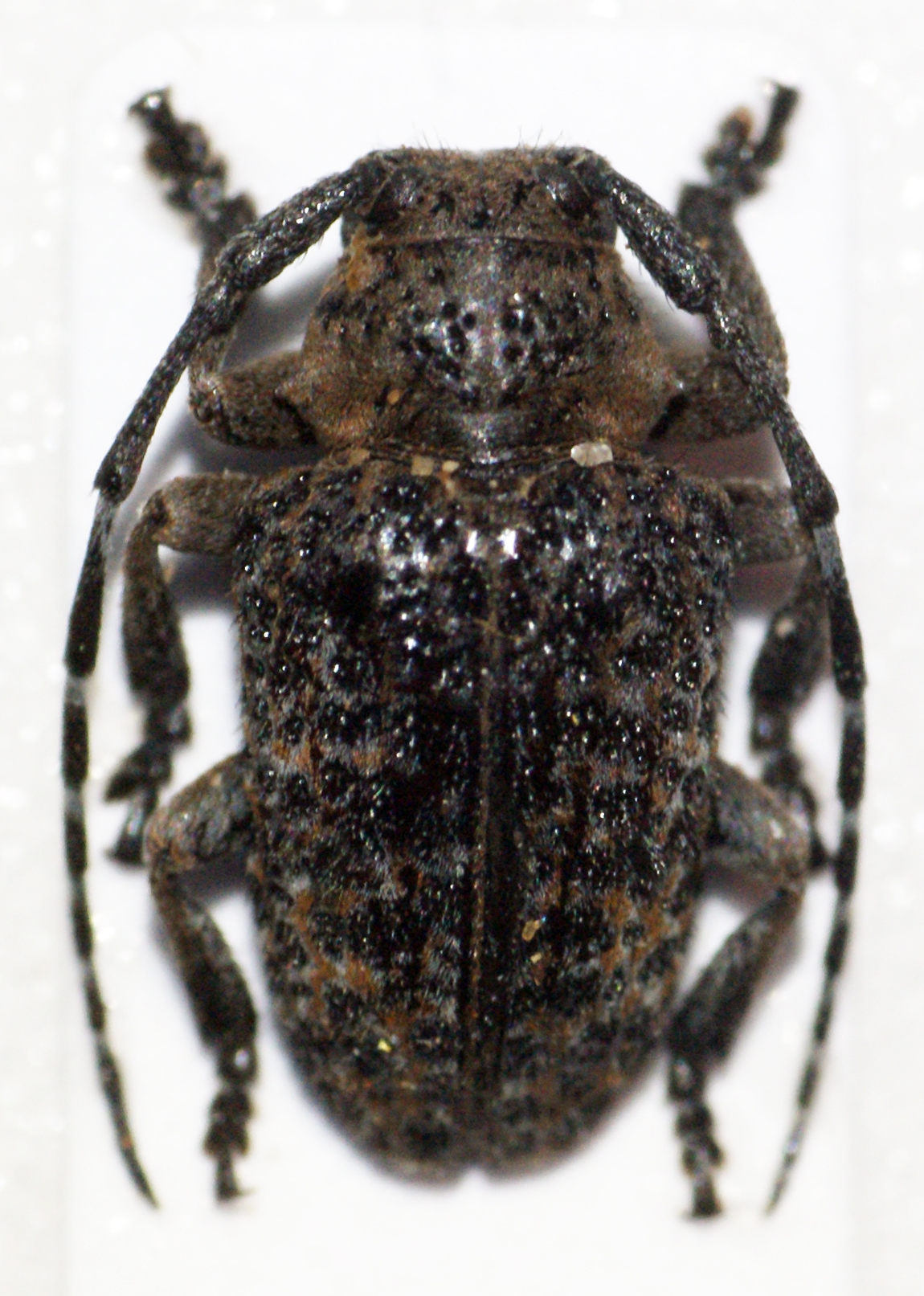
- Dichostates lignarius lacunosus

Scientific classification
- Domain: Eukaryota
- Kingdom: Animalia
- Phylum: Arthropoda
- Class: Insecta
- Order: Coleoptera
- Suborder: Polyphaga
- Infraorder: Cucujiformia
- Family: Cerambycidae
- Tribe: Crossotini
- Genus: Dichostates
- Species: D. lignarius

Binomial name
- Dichostates lignarius (Guérin-Méneville, 1850)

Synonyms
- Corus lignarius (Guérin-Méneville) Breuning, 1942; Crossotus lignarius Guérin-Méneville, 1850

= Dichostates lignarius =

Species of beetle

Dichostates lignarius is a species of beetle in the family Cerambycidae. It was described by Félix Édouard Guérin-Méneville in 1850. It is known from Botswana, Namibia, Ethiopia, Mozambique, Somalia, Kenya, Zimbabwe, and South Africa.

== Subspecies ==
- Dichostates lignarius lacunosus Fahraeus, 1872
- Dichostates lignarius lignarius (Guérin-Méneville, 1850)
