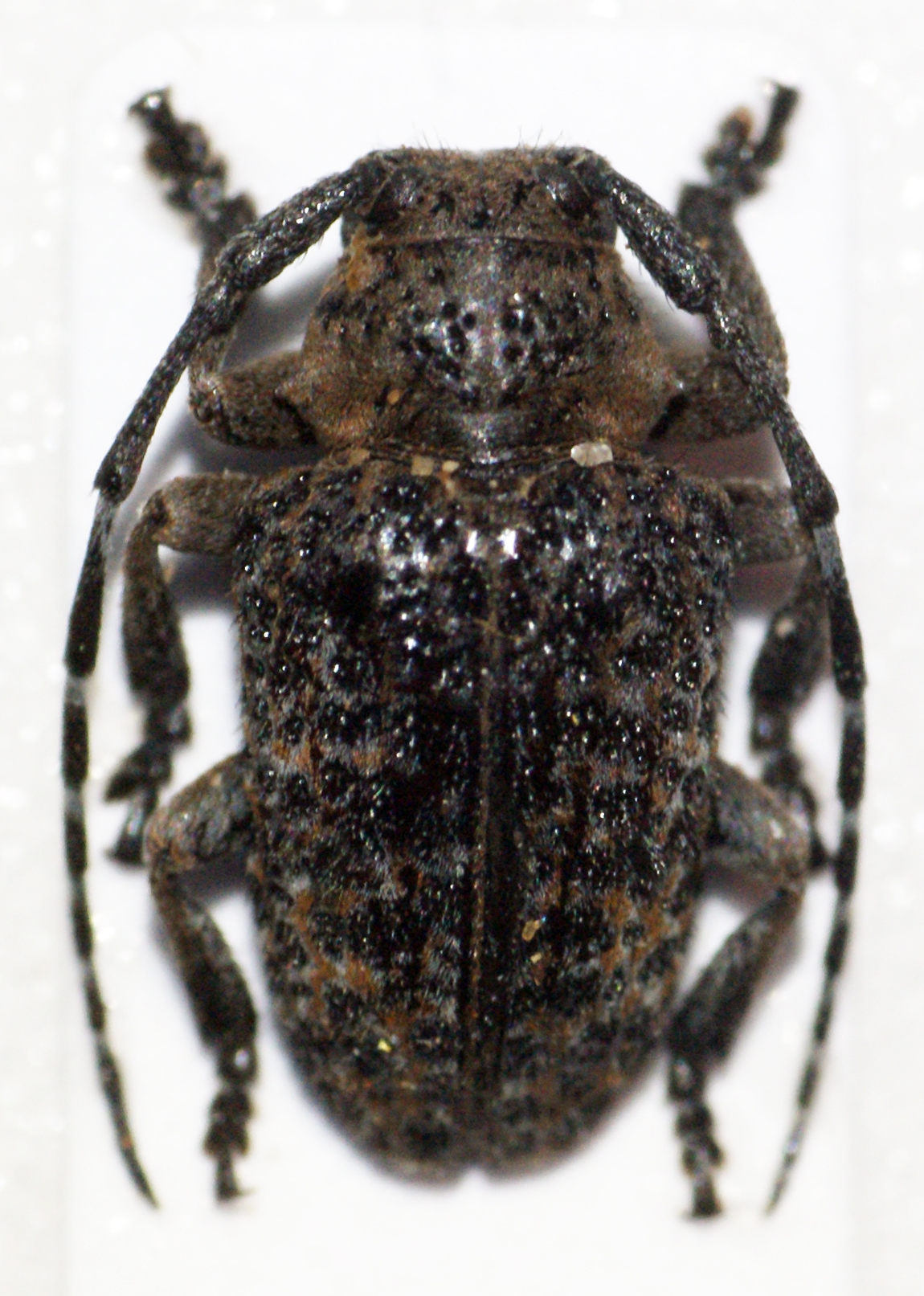
- Dichostates lignarius lacunosus

Scientific classification
- Domain: Eukaryota
- Kingdom: Animalia
- Phylum: Arthropoda
- Class: Insecta
- Order: Coleoptera
- Suborder: Polyphaga
- Infraorder: Cucujiformia
- Family: Cerambycidae
- Tribe: Crossotini
- Genus: Dichostates; Thomson, 1860

Type species
- Dichostates natalensis Thomson, 1860.

= Dichostates =

Genus of beetles

Dichostates is a genus of longhorn beetles of the subfamily Lamiinae.

- Dichostates ayresi Distant, 1898
- Dichostates biflavoplagiatus Lepesme & Breuning, 1952
- Dichostates camerunensis Breuning, 1954
- Dichostates compactus Fairmaire, 1887
- Dichostates concretus (Pascoe, 1857)
- Dichostates corticarius Hintz, 1910
- Dichostates depressus Báguena, 1952
- Dichostates flavoguttatus Hintz, 1912
- Dichostates flavopictus (Quedenfeldt, 1882)
- Dichostates hauseri Hintz, 1910
- Dichostates kuntzeni Hintz, 1912
- Dichostates lignarius (Guérin-Méneville, 1850)
- Dichostates lobatus Jordan, 1894
- Dichostates magnus Aurivillius, 1925
- Dichostates muelleri Quedenfeldt, 1888
- Dichostates nigroguttatus Jordan, 1894
- Dichostates obliquelineatus Breuning, 1942
- Dichostates occidentalis Breuning, 1954
- Dichostates partealbicollis Breuning, 1978
- Dichostates pygmaeus Téocchi, 2001
- Dichostates quadripunctatus (Chevrolat, 1855)
- Dichostates quadrisignatus Hintz, 1912
- Dichostates rougeoti Breuning, 1977
- Dichostates rubromaculatus Breuning, 1938
- Dichostates strandi Breuning, 1935
- Dichostates tabularis Kolbe, 1897
- Dichostates trifasciculatus Teocchi, Jiroux & Sudre, 2004
- Dichostates trilineatus Hintz, 1912
- Dichostates ugandae Breuning, 1935
