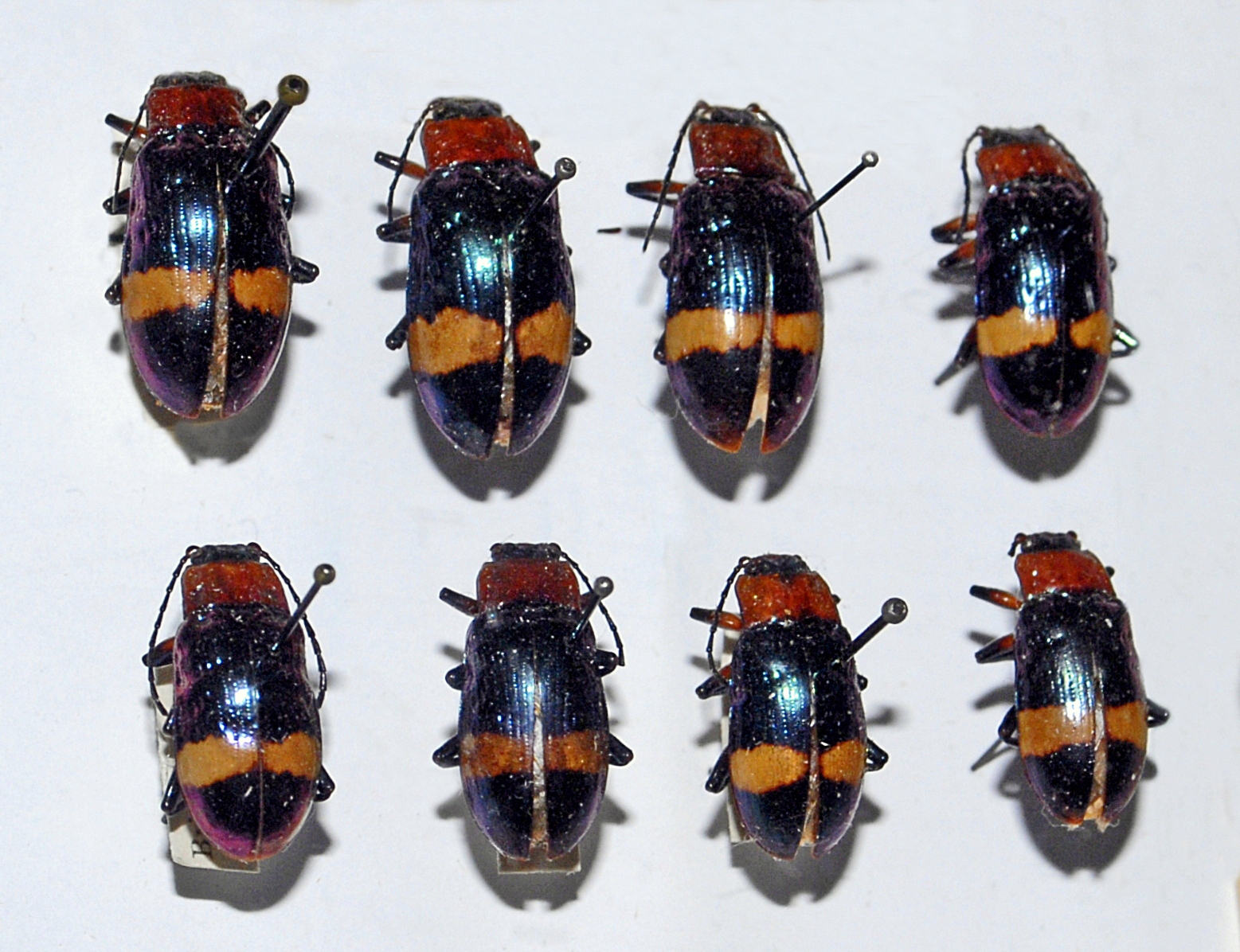
- Promechus whitei, Museum specimen

Scientific classification
- Domain: Eukaryota
- Kingdom: Animalia
- Phylum: Arthropoda
- Class: Insecta
- Order: Coleoptera
- Suborder: Polyphaga
- Infraorder: Cucujiformia
- Family: Chrysomelidae
- Subfamily: Chrysomelinae
- Genus: Promechus
- Species: P. whitei

Binomial name
- Promechus whitei (Baly, 1861)

Synonyms
- Aesernia whitei Baly, 1861

= Promechus whitei =

Species of leaf beetle

Promechus whitei is a species of beetle belonging to the Chrysomelidae family.

== Distribution ==
Promechus whitei occurs in Papua New Guinea.
