= Apenes lucidula =

Scientific classification
- Kingdom: Animalia
- Phylum: Arthropoda
- Class: Insecta
- Order: Coleoptera
- Suborder: Adephaga
- Family: Carabidae
- Genus: Apenes
- Species: A. lucidula

Binomial name
- Apenes lucidula (Dejean, 1831)

Species of beetle

Apenes lucidula is a species of ground beetle in the family Carabidae. It is found in the Caribbean Sea, Central America, and North America.

== Subspecies ==
These three subspecies belong to the species Apenes lucidula:

- Apenes lucidula dulculia Ball & Shpeley, 1992
- Apenes lucidula lucidula (Dejean, 1831)
- Apenes lucidula michelii Ball & Shpeley, 1992
