= Apenes hilariola =

Scientific classification
- Domain: Eukaryota
- Kingdom: Animalia
- Phylum: Arthropoda
- Class: Insecta
- Order: Coleoptera
- Suborder: Adephaga
- Family: Carabidae
- Genus: Apenes
- Species: A. hilariola

Binomial name
- Apenes hilariola Bates, 1891

Species of beetle

Apenes hilariola is a species of ground beetle in the family Carabidae. It is found in Central America and North America.
