= Dichostates ugandae =

Scientific classification
- Kingdom: Animalia
- Phylum: Arthropoda
- Class: Insecta
- Order: Coleoptera
- Suborder: Polyphaga
- Infraorder: Cucujiformia
- Family: Cerambycidae
- Tribe: Crossotini
- Genus: Dichostates
- Species: D. ugandae

Binomial name
- Dichostates ugandae Breuning, 1935

Synonyms
- Dichostathes ugandae Breuning, 1935; Dichostatoides ugandae Breuning, 1935

Species of beetle

Dichostates ugandae is a species of beetle in the family Cerambycidae. It was described by Stephan von Breuning in 1935. It is known from the Democratic Republic of the Congo and Uganda.
