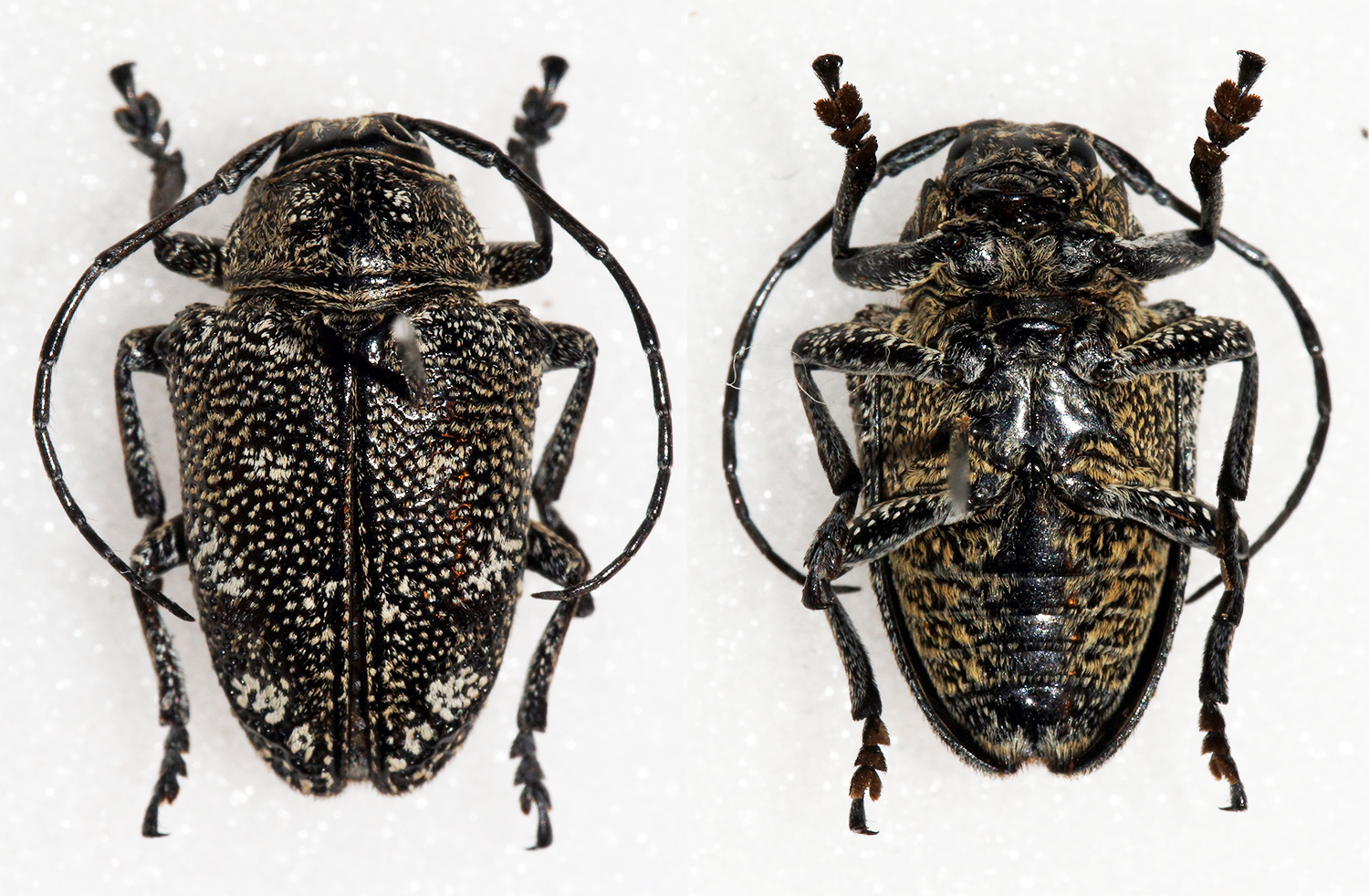

Scientific classification
- Kingdom: Animalia
- Phylum: Arthropoda
- Class: Insecta
- Order: Coleoptera
- Suborder: Polyphaga
- Infraorder: Cucujiformia
- Family: Cerambycidae
- Tribe: Crossotini
- Genus: Dichostates
- Species: D. flavopictus

Binomial name
- Dichostates flavopictus (Quedenfeldt, 1882)

= Dichostates flavopictus =

Species of beetle

Dichostates flavopictus is a species of beetle in the family Cerambycidae. It was described by Quedenfeldt in 1882. It contains the varietas Dichostates flavopictus var. bimaculatus.
