= Dichostates muelleri =

Scientific classification
- Kingdom: Animalia
- Phylum: Arthropoda
- Class: Insecta
- Order: Coleoptera
- Suborder: Polyphaga
- Infraorder: Cucujiformia
- Family: Cerambycidae
- Tribe: Crossotini
- Genus: Dichostates
- Species: D. muelleri

Binomial name
- Dichostates muelleri Quedenfeldt, 1888

Species of beetle

Dichostates muelleri is a species of beetle in the family Cerambycidae. It was described by Quedenfeldt in 1888. It is known from Democratic Republic of the Congo.
