= Dichostates compactus =

Scientific classification
- Kingdom: Animalia
- Phylum: Arthropoda
- Class: Insecta
- Order: Coleoptera
- Suborder: Polyphaga
- Infraorder: Cucujiformia
- Family: Cerambycidae
- Tribe: Crossotini
- Genus: Dichostates
- Species: D. compactus

Binomial name
- Dichostates compactus Fairmaire, 1887

Species of beetle

Dichostates compactus is a species of beetle in the family Cerambycidae. It was described by Fairmaire in 1887.

== Subspecies ==
- Dichostates compactus compactus Fairmaire, 1887
- Dichostates compactus damarensis Breuning, 1962
