= Dichostates trifasciculatus =

Scientific classification
- Domain: Eukaryota
- Kingdom: Animalia
- Phylum: Arthropoda
- Class: Insecta
- Order: Coleoptera
- Suborder: Polyphaga
- Infraorder: Cucujiformia
- Family: Cerambycidae
- Tribe: Crossotini
- Genus: Dichostates
- Species: D. trifasciculatus

Binomial name
- Dichostates trifasciculatus Teocchi, Jiroux & Sudre, 2004

Synonyms
- Dichostates trifasciculatus Breuning (in litteris)

Species of beetle

Dichostates trifasciculatus is a species of beetle in the family Cerambycidae. It was described by Teocchi, Jiroux and Sudre in 2004.
