= Dichostates magnus =

Scientific classification
- Domain: Eukaryota
- Kingdom: Animalia
- Phylum: Arthropoda
- Class: Insecta
- Order: Coleoptera
- Suborder: Polyphaga
- Infraorder: Cucujiformia
- Family: Cerambycidae
- Tribe: Crossotini
- Genus: Dichostates
- Species: D. magnus

Binomial name
- Dichostates magnus Aurivillius, 1925

Species of beetle

Dichostates magnus is a species of beetle in the family Cerambycidae. It was described by Per Olof Christopher Aurivillius in 1925.
