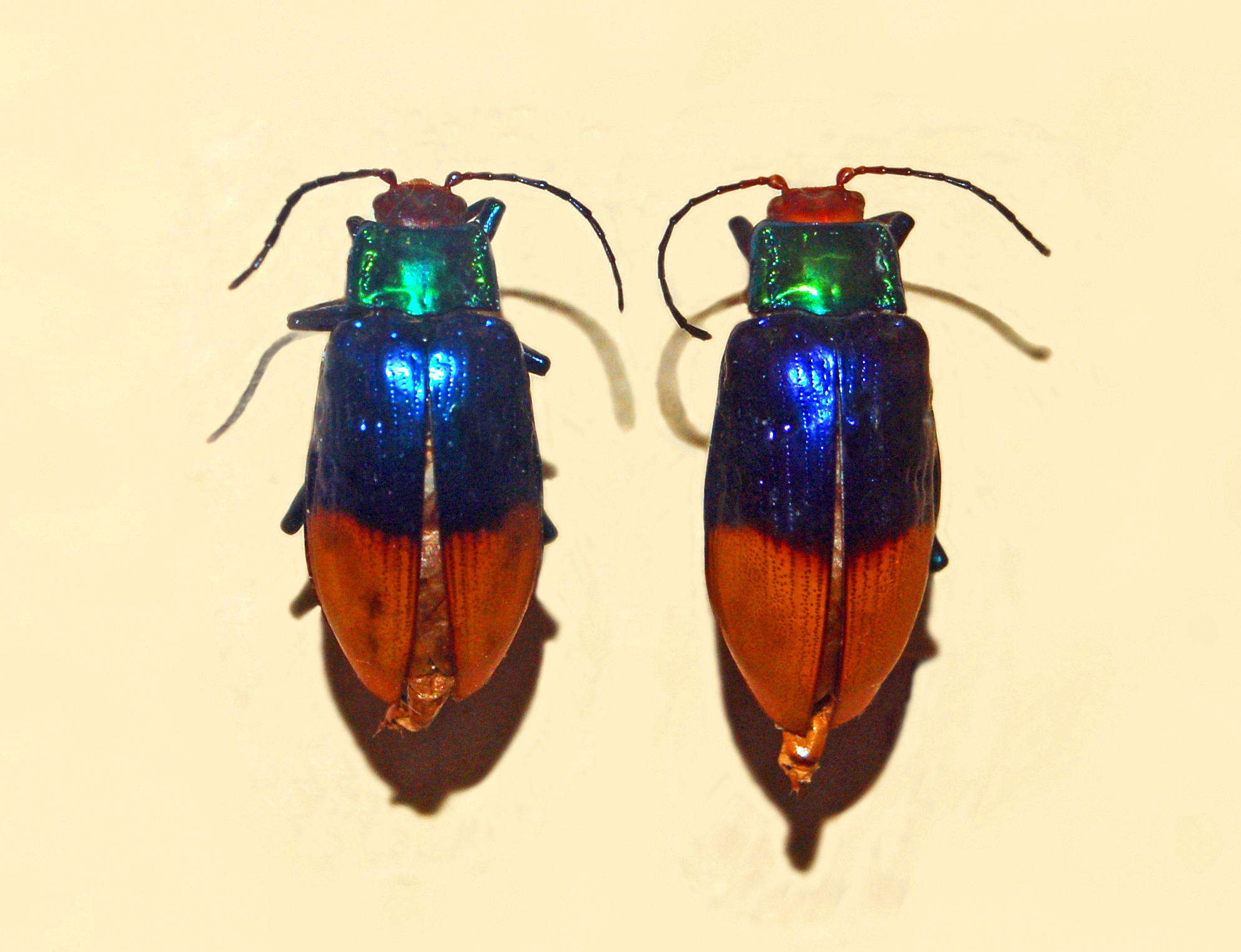
- Promechus splendens from Papua New Guinea

Scientific classification
- Domain: Eukaryota
- Kingdom: Animalia
- Phylum: Arthropoda
- Class: Insecta
- Order: Coleoptera
- Suborder: Polyphaga
- Infraorder: Cucujiformia
- Family: Chrysomelidae
- Subfamily: Chrysomelinae
- Genus: Promechus; Boisduval, 1835

Synonyms
- Aesernia Stål, 1860

= Promechus =

Genus of leaf beetles

Promechus is a genus of beetles belonging to the Chrysomelidae family.

== List of species ==
The genus includes the following species:

- Promechus abidi Gressitt & Hart, 1974
- Promechus arcuatus (Clavareau, 1912)
- Promechus australicus (Jacoby, 1887)
- Promechus bimaculatus (Weise, 1918)
- Promechus buprestoides Gressitt & Hart, 1974
- Promechus corallipes (Gestro, 1875)
- Promechus costatus (Jacoby, 1906)
- Promechus eburneocinctus Gressitt & Hart, 1974
- Promechus formosus (Gestro, 1876)
- Promechus gestroi (Jacoby, 1906)
- Promechus giganteus Gressitt & Hart, 1974
- Promechus helleri (Clavareau, 1906)
- Promechus inflatus Gressitt & Hart, 1974
- Promechus lacustris Gressitt & Hart, 1974
- Promechus latefasciatus (Jacoby, 1887)
- Promechus magnificus (Baly, 1863)
- Promechus meeki (Jacoby, 1906)
- Promechus metallicus Gressitt & Hart, 1974
- Promechus montanus (Heller, 1910)
- Promechus moszkowskii (Kuntzen, 1913)
- Promechus orientalis Gressitt & Hart, 1974
- Promechus paniae Gressitt & Hart, 1974
- Promechus parentheticus Gressitt & Hart, 1974
- Promechus parvus Gressitt & Hart, 1974
- Promechus pittospori Gressitt & Hart, 1974
- Promechus prosopon Gressitt & Hart, 1974
- Promechus pulchellus (Gestro, 1876)
- Promechus pulcher Gressitt & Hart, 1974
- Promechus regalis (Baly, 1863)
- Promechus schefflerae Gressitt & Hart, 1974
- Promechus sculpturatus (Heller, 1910)
- Promechus sedlacekorum Gressitt & Hart, 1974
- Promechus shanahani Gressitt & Hart, 1974
- Promechus splendens (Guérin-Méneville, 1833)
- Promechus straatmani Gressitt & Hart, 1974
- Promechus stygicus Gressitt & Hart, 1974
- Promechus subapicalis Gressitt & Hart, 1974
- Promechus sulcatus Gressitt & Hart, 1974
- Promechus sumptuosus (Gestro, 1876)
- Promechus telefominus Gressitt & Hart, 1974
- Promechus toxopei Gressitt & Hart, 1974
- Promechus tripartitus (Lea, 1915)
- Promechus variicollis Gressitt & Hart, 1974
- Promechus whitei (Baly, 1861)
