= Dichostates kuntzeni =

Scientific classification
- Domain: Eukaryota
- Kingdom: Animalia
- Phylum: Arthropoda
- Class: Insecta
- Order: Coleoptera
- Suborder: Polyphaga
- Infraorder: Cucujiformia
- Family: Cerambycidae
- Tribe: Crossotini
- Genus: Dichostates
- Species: D. kuntzeni

Binomial name
- Dichostates kuntzeni Hintz, 1912

Species of beetle

Dichostates kuntzeni is a species of beetle in the family Cerambycidae. It was described by Hintz in 1912. It is known from Cameroon, Equatorial Guinea, Gabon, the Democratic Republic of the Congo, Uganda, and Sierra Leone. It contains the varietas Dichostates kuntzeni var. ochreicollis.
