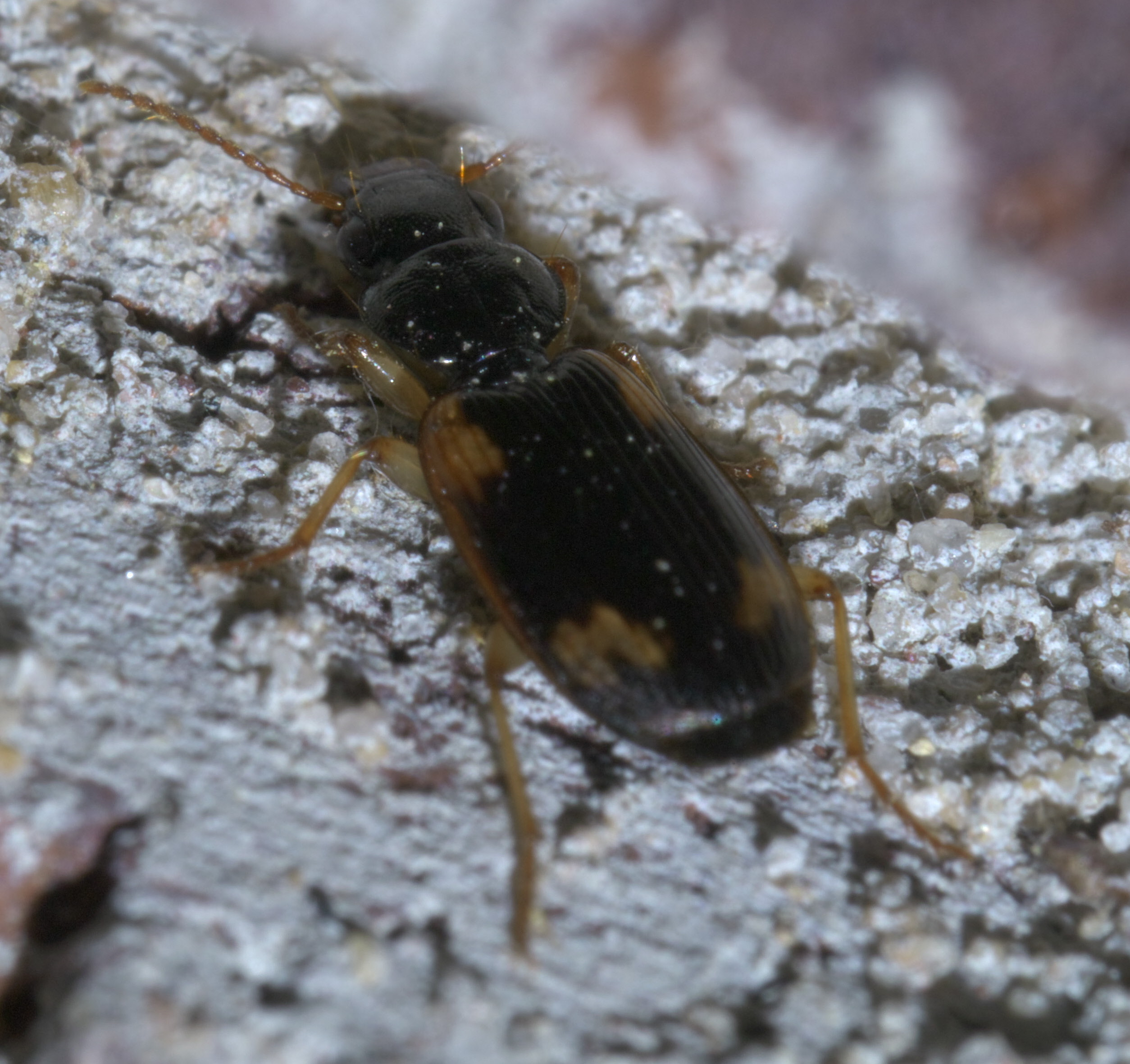

Scientific classification
- Domain: Eukaryota
- Kingdom: Animalia
- Phylum: Arthropoda
- Class: Insecta
- Order: Coleoptera
- Suborder: Adephaga
- Family: Carabidae
- Genus: Apenes
- Species: A. sinuata

Binomial name
- Apenes sinuata (Say, 1823)

= Apenes sinuata =

Species of beetle

Apenes sinuata is a species of ground beetle in the family Carabidae. It is found in North America.

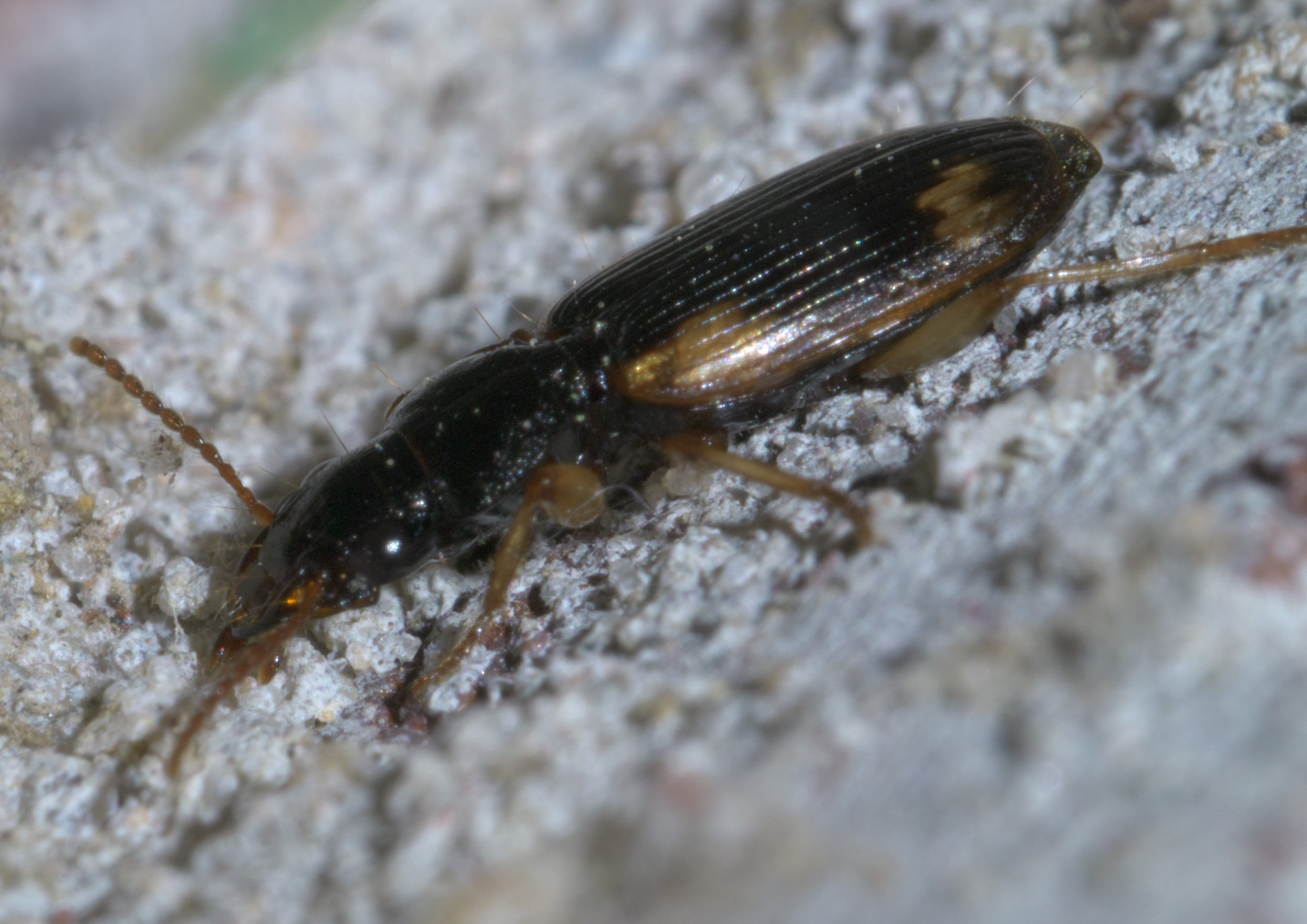
