= Dichostates tabularis =

Scientific classification
- Domain: Eukaryota
- Kingdom: Animalia
- Phylum: Arthropoda
- Class: Insecta
- Order: Coleoptera
- Suborder: Polyphaga
- Infraorder: Cucujiformia
- Family: Cerambycidae
- Tribe: Crossotini
- Genus: Dichostates
- Species: D. tabularis

Binomial name
- Dichostates tabularis Kolbe, 1897

Species of beetle

Dichostates tabularis is a species of beetle in the family Cerambycidae. It was described by Kolbe in 1897.

== Subspecies ==
- Dichostates tabularis kenyensis Adlbauer, 2015
- Dichostates tabularis tabularis Kolbe, 1897
