= Dichostates lobatus =

Scientific classification
- Domain: Eukaryota
- Kingdom: Animalia
- Phylum: Arthropoda
- Class: Insecta
- Order: Coleoptera
- Suborder: Polyphaga
- Infraorder: Cucujiformia
- Family: Cerambycidae
- Tribe: Crossotini
- Genus: Dichostates
- Species: D. lobatus

Binomial name
- Dichostates lobatus Jordan, 1894

Species of beetle

Dichostates lobatus is a species of beetle in the family Cerambycidae. It was described by Karl Jordan in 1894.

== Varieties ==
- Dichostates lobatus var. albomaculatus Breuning, 1942
- Dichostates lobatus var. fasciculatus Hintz, 1919
- Dichostates lobatus var. flavomaculatus Hintz, 1912
- Dichostates lobatus var. griseus Breuning, 1942
- Dichostates lobatus var. maculatus Hintz, 1919
- Dichostates lobatus var. ochraceomaculatus Breuning, 1942
