= Dichostates camerunensis =

Scientific classification
- Kingdom: Animalia
- Phylum: Arthropoda
- Class: Insecta
- Order: Coleoptera
- Suborder: Polyphaga
- Infraorder: Cucujiformia
- Family: Cerambycidae
- Tribe: Crossotini
- Genus: Dichostates
- Species: D. camerunensis

Binomial name
- Dichostates camerunensis Breuning, 1954

Species of beetle

Dichostates camerunensis is a species of beetle in the family Cerambycidae. It was described by Breuning in 1954. It is known from Cameroon.
