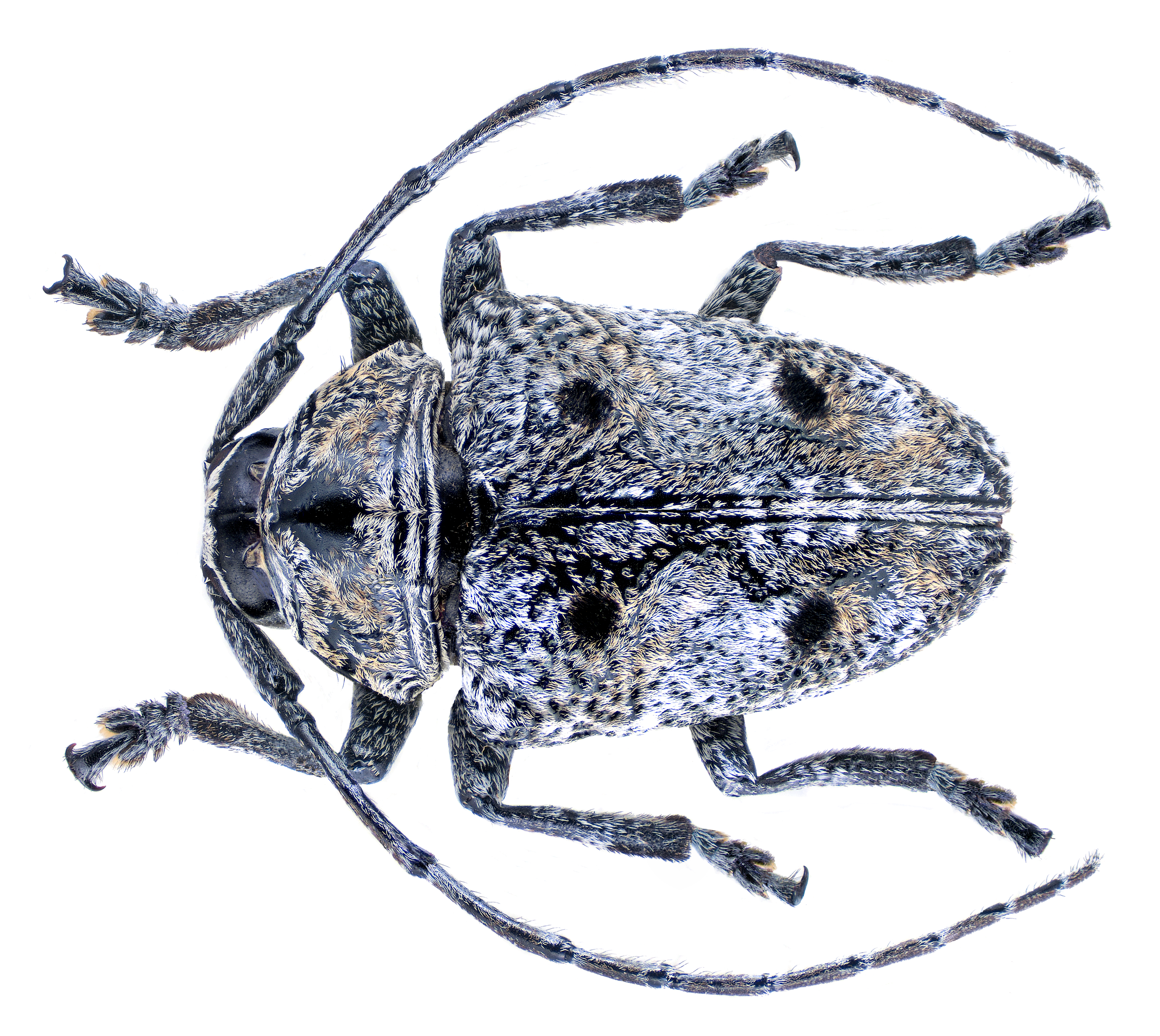

Scientific classification
- Domain: Eukaryota
- Kingdom: Animalia
- Phylum: Arthropoda
- Class: Insecta
- Order: Coleoptera
- Suborder: Polyphaga
- Infraorder: Cucujiformia
- Family: Cerambycidae
- Tribe: Crossotini
- Genus: Dichostates
- Species: D. quadripunctatus

Binomial name
- Dichostates quadripunctatus (Chevrolat, 1855)

Synonyms
- Phymasterna quadripunctata Chevrolat, 1855

= Dichostates quadripunctatus =

Species of beetle

Dichostates quadripunctatus is a species of beetle in the family Cerambycidae. It was described by Louis Alexandre Auguste Chevrolat in 1855. It is known from Cameroon, the Ivory Coast, the Democratic Republic of the Congo, Sierra Leone, Nigeria, and Togo. It contains the varietas Dichostates quadripunctatus var. fulvomaculatus.
