= Dichostates concretus =

Scientific classification
- Domain: Eukaryota
- Kingdom: Animalia
- Phylum: Arthropoda
- Class: Insecta
- Order: Coleoptera
- Suborder: Polyphaga
- Infraorder: Cucujiformia
- Family: Cerambycidae
- Tribe: Crossotini
- Genus: Dichostates
- Species: D. concretus

Binomial name
- Dichostates concretus (Pascoe, 1857)

Synonyms
- Dichostates albidus Hintz, 1912; Dichostates natalensis Thomson, 1860

Species of beetle

Dichostates concretus is a species of beetle in the family Cerambycidae. It was described by Francis Polkinghorne Pascoe in 1857. It is known from Tanzania, the Democratic Republic of the Congo, and South Africa.
