= Dichostates trilineatus =

Scientific classification
- Domain: Eukaryota
- Kingdom: Animalia
- Phylum: Arthropoda
- Class: Insecta
- Order: Coleoptera
- Suborder: Polyphaga
- Infraorder: Cucujiformia
- Family: Cerambycidae
- Tribe: Crossotini
- Genus: Dichostates
- Species: D. trilineatus

Binomial name
- Dichostates trilineatus Hintz, 1912

Species of beetle

Dichostates trilineatus is a species of beetle in the family Cerambycidae. It was described by Hintz in 1912. It is known from Kenya, the Democratic Republic of the Congo, Somalia, Uganda, and Tanzania.

== Subspecies ==
- Dichostates trilineatus similis Breuning, 1938
- Dichostates trilineatus trilineatus Hintz, 1912
