= Apenes nebulosa =

Scientific classification
- Domain: Eukaryota
- Kingdom: Animalia
- Phylum: Arthropoda
- Class: Insecta
- Order: Coleoptera
- Suborder: Adephaga
- Family: Carabidae
- Genus: Apenes
- Species: A. nebulosa

Binomial name
- Apenes nebulosa LeConte, 1867

Species of beetle

Apenes nebulosa is a species of ground beetle in the family Carabidae. It is found in Central America and North America.
