= Dichostates rougeoti =

Scientific classification
- Kingdom: Animalia
- Phylum: Arthropoda
- Class: Insecta
- Order: Coleoptera
- Suborder: Polyphaga
- Infraorder: Cucujiformia
- Family: Cerambycidae
- Tribe: Crossotini
- Genus: Dichostates
- Species: D. rougeoti

Binomial name
- Dichostates rougeoti Breuning, 1977

Species of beetle

Dichostates rougeoti is a species of beetle in the family Cerambycidae. It was described by Breuning in 1977.
