= Apenes coriacea =

Scientific classification
- Domain: Eukaryota
- Kingdom: Animalia
- Phylum: Arthropoda
- Class: Insecta
- Order: Coleoptera
- Suborder: Adephaga
- Family: Carabidae
- Genus: Apenes
- Species: A. coriacea

Binomial name
- Apenes coriacea (Chevrolat, 1863)

Species of beetle

Apenes coriacea is a species of ground beetle in the family Carabidae. It is found in the Caribbean Sea and North America.
